= 2025 in Estonia =

- Decades: 2000s; 2010s; 2020s
- See also: Other events of 2025; Timeline of Estonian history

Events in the year 2025 in Estonia.

== Incumbents ==
- President: Alar Karis
- Prime Minister: Kristen Michal

== Events ==
=== January ===
- 28 January–2 February – The 2025 European Figure Skating Championships were held at the Tondiraba Ice Hall in Tallinn.

=== February ===
- 8–9 February – Estonia, along with Latvia and Lithuania disconnect from the Russian electric grid and joins the Synchronous grid of Continental Europe.

=== March ===
- 26 March – The Riigikogu votes to amend the Constitution to bar Russian, Belarusian citizens from voting in municipal elections.

=== April ===
- 26 April–2 May – 2025 IIHF World Championship Division I Group B

=== May ===
- 17 May – Estonia's Tommy Cash finishes in third place at Eurovision 2025 in Switzerland with the single "Espresso Macchiato".

=== June ===
- 4 June – The Riigikogu votes to withdraw Estonia from the Ottawa Treaty on Landmines.

=== August ===
- 13 August – The Estonian government expels the first secretary of the Russian Embassy in Tallinn on charges of undermining the Estonia’s constitutional order and violating sanctions, prompting the Russian government to expel an Estonian diplomat in retaliation on 4 September.
- 25 August – A suspected Ukrainian drone believed to have been diverted to Estonia by Russian jamming crashes into a field in the village of Koruste in Elva Parish, Tartu County.
- 26 August – A dual Russian-Estonian citizen is convicted of spying for Russia and sentenced to three years' imprisonment by the Tartu District Court.

=== September ===
- 19 September – Three Russian MiG-31 fighter jets enter Estonian airspace and hover for around 12 minutes before being escorted out by Italian F-35s assigned to NATO's Baltic Air Policing mission. In response, Estonia invokes NATO Article 4 to call for consultations.

=== October ===
- 7 October – The Viru County Court convicts Estonian Defense Forces member Ivan Dmitriev for spying on behalf of Russia and sentences him to four years and 11 months' imprisonment.
- 10 October – Estonia temporarily closes the Saatse border crossing with Russia following heightened Russian military activity.
- 19 October – 2025 Estonian municipal elections

=== December ===
- 17 December – Three Russian border guards are reported to have entered Estonian territory using a hovercraft before returning to Russia near the village of Vasknarva along the Narva River.
- 31 December – The St. Vincent and the Grenadines-flagged vessel Fitburg is intercepted by Finnish authorities on suspicion of damaging an undersea telecommunications cable in the Gulf of Finland running from Helsinki, Finland to Tallinn, within Estonia's exclusive economic zone.

== Art and entertainment ==
- List of Estonian submissions for the Academy Award for Best International Feature Film

== Holidays ==
- 1 January – New Year's Day
- 24 February – Independence Day
- 18 April – Good Friday
- 20 April – Easter Sunday
- 1 May – Spring day
- 8 June – Whit Sunday
- 23 June – Victory Day
- 24 June – Midsummer Day
- 20 August – Independence Restoration Day
- 24 December – Christmas Eve
- 25 December – Christmas Day
- 26 December – Second Day of Christmas

== Deaths ==
=== January ===
- 6 January – Margus Oopkaup, actor (born 1959)
- 31 January – Kärt Tomingas, actress, singer and educator (born 1967)

=== March ===
- 16 March – Olivia Saar, children's writer and poet, journalist and editor (born 1931)
- 17 March – Uno Laur, Estonian singer (born 1961)

=== May ===
- 17 May
  - Priit Jaagant – businessman (born 1972)
  - Oleg Sõnajalg – businessman (born 1959)

=== August ===
- 13 August – Väino Kull – politician (born 1943)
- 21 August – Ago Kalde, volleyball player (born 1945)

=== September ===
- 5 September – Enn Põldroos – painter, monumental artist, writer and politician (born 1933)

== See also ==
- 2025 in the European Union
- 2025 in Europe
