= 2026 in Estonia =

- Decades: 2000s; 2010s; 2020s
- See also: Other events of 2026; Timeline of Estonian history

The following is a list of events that occurred or will occur during 2026 in Estonia.

== Incumbents ==
- President: Alar Karis (until 11 October); Ülle Madise onwards
- Prime Minister: Kristen Michal

== Events ==
=== February ===
- 12 February – A Russian national is deported from Estonia on charges of spying for Russia.

=== March ===
- 6 March – Estonia boycotts the opening ceremony of the 2026 Winter Paralympics in Italy in protest over Russian athletes being allowed to compete under the Russian flag after the lifting of sanctions imposed over the Russian invasion of Ukraine in 2022.
- 25 March – A Russian drone hits the Auvere Power Plant near Narva.

=== May ===
- 19 May – A suspected Ukrainian drone is shot down by a Romanian fighter jet belonging to a NATO contingent over an area between Vortsjarv and Poltsamaa, prompting an apology from Ukraine.

=== August ===
- 15 August – An arson attack blamed on Russia is carried out on a production facility of Milrem Robotics.

=== September ===
- 2 September – 2026 Estonian presidential election: Ülle Madise is elected as president by the Riigikogu.
- 22 September – 2026 Estonian education workers' strike is held.

=== November ===
- 2 November – A cyberattack is carried out on refrigeration systems of supermarkets across seven European countries including Estonia, resulting in financial losses caused by food spoilage.
- 11 November – A Ukrainian drone briefly enters Estonian airspace during an attack on the Ust-Luga terminal in Russia.

== Holidays ==
- 1 January – New Year's Day
- 24 February – Independence Day
- 3 April – Good Friday
- 5 April – Easter Sunday
- 1 May – Spring day
- 24 May – Whit Sunday
- 23 June – Victory Day
- 24 June – Midsummer Day
- 20 August – Independence Restoration Day
- 24 December – Christmas Eve
- 25 December – Christmas Day
- 26 December – Second Day of Christmas

== Deaths ==
- 1 January – Arno Liiver, actor (born 1954)
- 12 March –
  - Peeter Simm, film director (born 1953)
  - Valeri Kirss, media personality and lawyer (born 1945)
- 25 March – Gameboy Tetris, rapper (5miinust, born 1985)
- 31 March – Eili Sild, actress (born 1942)
- 16 July – Kristjan Svirgsden, film director (born 1954)
- 22 August – Siim Kallas, prime minister (2002–2003), minister of foreign affairs (1995–1996) and European commissioner (2004–2014) (born 1948)

== See also ==
- 2026 in the European Union
- 2026 in Europe
