= 2022 in Estonia =

- Decades: 2000s; 2010s; 2020s
- See also: Other events of 2022; Timeline of Estonian history

Events in the year 2022 in Estonia.

== Incumbents ==
- President: Alar Karis
- Prime Minister: Kaja Kallas

== Events ==
Ongoing — COVID-19 pandemic in Estonia

- 18 February – Estonia delivers a shipment of U.S.-made FGM-148 Javelin anti-tank missiles to Ukraine.
- 26 February – Estonia announces that it will close its airspace to all Russian airlines.
- 2 March – Estonia voted on a United Nations resolution condemning Russia for its invasion of Ukraine.
- 3 March – The Estonian cargo ship MV Helt sinks near the Port of Odesa in the Black Sea following an explosion. All six crew members on board were rescued, according to authorities. Estonian Foreign Minister Eva-Maria Liimets says that an investigation into the incident will occur.
- 5 April – Denmark, Estonia, Italy, Portugal, Romania, Slovenia, Spain, and Sweden expel over 100 Russian diplomatic staff from their countries. Latvia closes the Russian consulates in Daugavpils and Liepāja, while Estonia closes the Russian diplomatic facilities in Narva and Tartu. These actions come as a reaction to the newly revealed Bucha massacre.
- 3 June – Estonia's coalition agreement collapses as the junior coalition partner, the Centre Party, joins the far-right EKRE in defeating a government bill on primary education, and is subsequently expelled by Prime Minister Kaja Kallas. Kallas is expected to form a coalition with two other parties, Isamaa and the Social Democrats.
- 17 June – Estonia removes all of its COVID-19 entry restrictions for non-EU travellers after the Estonian Health Board concluded that the situation is under control and that third-country nationals are unlikely to affect the epidemiological situation in the country.
- 21 June – Estonia reports that a Russian Border Service Mi-8 helicopter violated its airspace over the weekend. The Russian ambassador to Estonia was summoned in response to the incident.
- 29 June – Estonia reports its first case of monkeypox.
- 14 July – Prime Minister of Estonia Kaja Kallas resigns to form a new coalition government.
- 18 July – A new three-party coalition government is formed.
- 11 August – Estonia and Latvia formally withdraw from the Cooperation between China and Central and Eastern European Countries group amid tensions with China over its human rights record and its support of Russia's war on Ukraine.

== Sport ==
Basketball

- 2021–22 European North Basketball League
- 2021–22 Latvian–Estonian Basketball League

Football

Ice hockey

- 2021–22 EML season
- 2022 IIHF World U18 Championship Division II
- 2022 World Junior Ice Hockey Championships – Division I

Other sports

- Estonia at the 2022 Winter Olympics
- Estonia at the 2022 Winter Paralympics

== Deaths ==
- 6 January – Maria Klenskaja, actress (born 1951).
- 3 February – Madis Milling, actor, television and radio presenter and politician (born 1970).
- 5 February – Leili Pärnpuu, chess player (born 1950)
- 12 February –
  - Ülo Lepik, mathematician and mechanics researcher (b. 1921)
  - Karl Vaino, politician (born 1923).
- 28 February – Leonhard Lapin, architect (born 1947)
- 3 March – Bruno Saul, politician (born 1932)
- 16 March – Helene Vannari, actress (born 1948).
- 3 April – Ave Alavainu, poet (born 1942)
- 16 April – Lembit Arro, judge and politician (born 1930)
- 18 April – Rein Ratas, politician (born 1938)
- 30 April – Ülo Tulik, agronomist and politician (born 1957)
- 20 May –
  - Hillar Palamets, historian (born 1927)
  - Kirill Teiter, politician (born 1952)
- 7 June – Raivo Trass, actor (born 1946)
- 12 June – Vello Lään, sports journalist (born 1937)
- 22 June – Jüri Tarmak, Olympic high jumper (born 1946)
- 27 June – Mats Traat, poet (born 1936)
- 12 July – Tõnu Saar, actor (born 1944)
- 30 August – Jaak Kangilaski, art historian (born 1939)
- 16 October – Jüri Arrak, painter (born 1936)
- 20 November – Riho Sibul, singer (born 1958)
- 2 December – Tiit-Rein Viitso, linguist (born 1938)
- 10 December – Kihnu Virve, folk singer (born 1928)
- 17 December – Urmas Sisask, composer (born 1960)
- 29 December – Edgar Savisaar, politician (born 1950)
