= 2027 in Estonia =

- Decades: 2000s; 2010s; 2020s
- See also: Other events of 2027; Timeline of Estonian history

The following is a list of events that occurred or will occur during 2027 in Estonia.

== Events ==
=== Predicted and scheduled ===
- 10–21 February – Biathlon World Championships 2027
- By 7 March – 2027 Estonian parliamentary election
- 1–7 May – 2027 Men's Ice Hockey World Championships Division I Group A in Tallinn
- 2 August – Solar eclipse of August 2, 2027 (partial eclipse)

== Holidays ==
- 1 January – New Year's Day
- 24 February – Independence Day
- 26 March – Good Friday
- 28 March – Easter Sunday
- 1 May – Spring day
- 16 May – Whit Sunday
- 23 June – Victory Day
- 24 June – Midsummer Day
- 20 August – Independence Restoration Day
- 24 December – Christmas Eve
- 25 December – Christmas Day
- 26 December – Second Day of Christmas

== See also ==
- 2027 in the European Union
- 2027 in Europe
