= 2020 in Estonia =

- Decades: 2000s; 2010s; 2020s
- See also: Other events of 2020; Timeline of Estonian history

Events from the year 2020 in Estonia

== Incumbents ==
- President: Kersti Kaljulaid
- Prime Minister: Jüri Ratas

== Events ==
- February 27 - 1st case of the COVID-19 pandemic in Estonia
- 3 March: A second person tested positive; the patient had arrived on 29 February from Bergamo, Italy travelling through Riga Airport. Two other Estonian passengers from the same flight and one returnee from Bergamo, arriving through Tallinn Airport, tested positive on 5 March.
- 6 March: the Health Board announced 5 more cases, all of them had travelled on board the same flight from Bergamo, Italy to Riga, Latvia on 29 February, thus bringing the total of infected persons on board the flight to eight, and the total number of cases in Estonia to ten.
  - the Kristiine High School in Tallinn was closed for two weeks, after a student who had returned from Northern Italy was sent to school by their parents despite having felt unwell after the trip. The pupil and their family tested COVID-19-positive. All 850 students of the school were told to stay at home.
- 10 March: Three more people were diagnosed with COVID-19. Two of them had returned from Northern Italy, and one from France.
- 11 March: the Health Board confirmed four more cases, including a person from Tallinn, who had returned from an at-risk area; and a person in Tartu, who had returned from Milan on 7 March. The first two cases in Saaremaa were also confirmed: the patients had been in contact with the Power Volley Milano team members during the 2019–20 CEV Challenge Cup matches held in Saaremaa on 4 and 5 March. On 9 March, five Milan players had been diagnosed with fever before a league match. The infected in Saaremaa included the CEO of the Saaremaa VK volleyball club.
- 12 March: the Health Board announced 10 new cases, bringing the total number of confirmed cases to 27. The new cases confirmed the transmission of the virus locally.
- 13 March: In the morning, the number of infected had reached 41. In the evening, the number of cases had reached 79, doubling the total cases overnight, with the first cases reported in Võru, Pärnu, and Ida-Viru County.
- 14 March: The number of infected was 115. By county, the count of infected was: 54 cases in Tallinn and Harju County, 31 in Saare County, 9 in Võru County, 6 in Tartu County, 12 in Pärnu County, and 3 in Lääne-Viru and Ida-Viru County each. A total of 853 samples had been tested.
- 15 March: The number of confirmed cases was 171. Since 31 January, a total of 1,133 samples had been tested.

Due to the wide spread of the disease, the criteria for testing were changed, so that only people with more serious symptoms, at-risk groups, healthcare workers, and people providing vital services were to be tested.

- 16 March: The number of confirmed infected was 205. A total of 1,387 samples had been tested.
- 17 March: The number of confirmed infected was 225. A total of 1,625 samples had been tested.
- 18 March: The number of confirmed infected was 258. A total of 2,020 samples had been tested.
- 19 March: The number of confirmed infected was 267. A total of 2,259 samples had been tested.
- 20 March: The number of confirmed infected was 283. A total of 2,504 samples had been tested.
- 21 March: The number of confirmed infected was 306. A total of 2,812 samples had been tested.
- 22 March: The number of confirmed infected was 326. A total of 3,229 samples had been tested.
- 23 March: The number of confirmed infected was 352. A total of 3,724 samples had been tested.
- 25 March: First death of coronavirus patient.
- 26 March: In an elderly home in Saaremaa two residents tested positive for coronavirus.
- 22 October: The Coalition government agrees on a Marriage referendum will take place in 2021. The referendum was pushed by the Conservative People's Party of Estonia and the question will be on whether or not marriage should be defined in the constitution as being between one man and one woman.

== Deaths ==
- 23 July – Leida Rammo, actress (b. 1924)
- 9 August – Aarand Roos, linguist, writer and diplomat (b. 1940)

== See also ==
- 2020 in Estonian football
- 2020 in Estonian television
