= 2024 in Estonia =

- Decades: 2000s; 2010s; 2020s
- See also: Other events of 2024; Timeline of Estonian history

Events in the year 2024 in Estonia.

== Incumbents ==
- President: Alar Karis
- Prime Minister:
  - Kaja Kallas (until 23 July)
  - Kristen Michal (23 July onwards)

== Events ==
=== January ===
- 1 January – Estonia becomes the 36th country in the world where same-sex couples can marry.

=== February ===
- 13 February – The Prime Minister of Estonia, Kaja Kallas, is reportedly put on the Russian Interior Ministry's register of wanted people due to the removal of Soviet War Memorials, making Kallas the first known government leader to be added to a wanted list by Russian authorities.
- 23 February–2 March – 2024 Biathlon Junior World Championships

=== March ===
- 2–3 March – 2024 Miss Valentine Tartu Grand Prix at Tartu
- 24–29 March – 2024 IIHF Women's World Championship Division III B at Kohtla-Järve

=== May ===
- 23 May – Twenty-five buoys used to demarcate the Estonia–Russia border along the Narva River are removed by Russian border guards in what Estonian authorities call a "a provocative border incident”.
- 31 May – Estonia becomes the 24th full member of the European Organization for Nuclear Research (CERN).

=== June ===
- 9 June – 2024 European Parliament election
- 26 June – The leaders of Poland, Lithuania, Latvia, and Estonia call on the European Union to construct a €2.5 billion (US$2.67 billion) defence line between them and Russia and Belarus to secure the EU from military, economic, and migrant-related threats.
- 28 June – Prime Minister Kaja Kallas is nominated to become High Representative of the Union for Foreign Affairs and Security Policy of the European Union.
- 29 June – Climate Minister Kristen Michal is nominated by the ruling Estonian Reform Party to replace Kaja Kallas as Prime Minister.

=== July ===
- 15 July – Prime minister Kaja Kallas resigns in order to assume her new role as High Representative of the Union for Foreign Affairs and Security Policy for the European External Action Service.
- 16 July – The Baltic states announce their exit from the Russian and Belarusian electricity grids along with plans to synchronize their grid with the continental Europe grid effective 9 February 2025.

=== September ===
- 5–8 September – 2024 European Junior Judo Championships at Tallinn

=== November ===
- 25 November – Authorities announce that eight British soldiers participating in a NATO exercise were injured in a vehicular pileup along the Tallinn-Narva highway the week prior.

=== December ===
- 25 December – The submarine Estlink-2 power cable running under the Gulf of Finland between Finland and Estonia is cut, causing a significant decrease in Estonia's electricity supply and leading to suspicions that a vessel linked to Russia is responsible.

== Art and entertainment ==
- List of Estonian submissions for the Academy Award for Best International Feature Film

== Holidays ==
- 1 January – New Year's Day
- 24 February – Independence Day
- 29 March - Good Friday
- 31 March - Easter Sunday
- 1 May - Spring day
- 19 May - Whit Sunday
- 23 June – Victory Day
- 24 June – Midsummer Day
- 20 August – Independence Restoration Day
- 24 December - Christmas Eve
- 25 December - Christmas Day
- 26 December – Second Day of Christmas

== Deaths ==
- 15 January – Uno Palu, 90, Olympic decathlete (1956)
- 16 January – Vaino Väljas, 92, diplomat and politician, first secretary of the communist party (1988–1990)
- 24 January – Väino Uibo, 81, actor, singer and theatre director
- 29 October – Ragne Veensalu, 37, actress
- 31 December – Arnold Rüütel, 96, president (2001–2006), chairman of the Supreme Soviet (1990–1992) and the Presidium of the Supreme Soviet (1983–1990).

== See also ==
- 2024 in the European Union
- 2024 in Europe
