= 2021 in Estonia =

- Decades: 2000s; 2010s; 2020s
- See also: Other events of 2021; Timeline of Estonian history

Events from the year 2021 in Estonia.

== Incumbents ==
- President:
  - Kersti Kaljulaid (until 11 October)
  - Alar Karis (from 11 October)
- Prime Minister:
  - Jüri Ratas (until 26 January)
  - Kaja Kallas (from 26 January)

== Events ==
Ongoing — COVID-19 pandemic in Estonia

=== January ===
- January 14 – Prime Minister Jüri Ratas resigned after the Estonian Centre Party and Secretary-General Mihhail Korb were named as suspects in an influence peddling scandal linked to the Porto Franco real estate development. President Kersti Kaljulaid invited Kaja Kallas of the Estonian Reform Party to try to form a new coalition.
- January 26 – Kaja Kallas takes over as new Prime Minister.

=== Scheduled events ===
- 22 to 28 February – Scheduled date for the 2021 World Ski Orienteering Championships, to be held in Kääriku.
- The 2021 Men's European Volleyball Championship is set to be held in the four countries Poland, Czech Republic, Estonia and Finland.

== Deaths ==
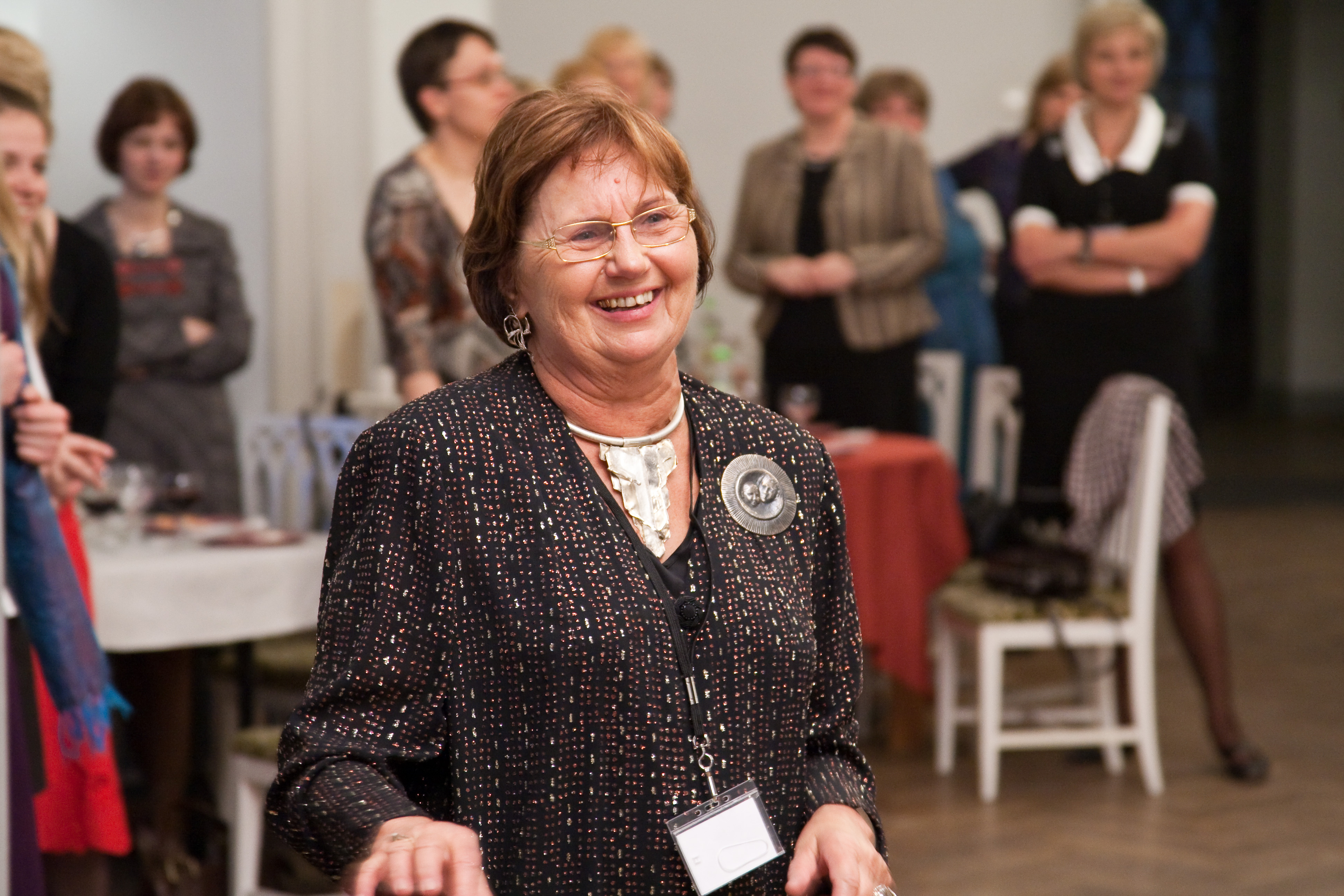
Tiina Talvik

- 15 January – Tiit Lilleorg, actor (born 1941)
- 9 February – Tiina Talvik, pediatrician and medical researcher (born 1938)
- 4 March – Johannes Kert, politician, military officer, former Commander of the Estonian Defence Forces (born 1959)
- 14 March – Ester Mägi, composer (born 1922)
- 8 September – Uno Loop, singer, guitarist, educator and sportsman (born 1930)
