= Public holidays in Estonia =

All official holidays in Estonia are established by acts of Parliament.

== Public holidays ==
The following are holidays that mean days off:

Date	English Name	Estonian Name	Remarks
1 January	New Year's Day	uusaasta	
24 February	Independence Day	iseseisvuspäev	National Day – celebrates the Declaration of Independence in 1918.
Moveable Friday	Good Friday	suur reede	
Moveable Sunday	Easter Sunday	ülestõusmispühade 1. püha	Commonly known as lihavõtted or munadepühad.
1 May	Spring Day	kevadpüha	
Moveable Sunday	Whit Sunday	nelipühade 1. püha	
23 June	Victory Day	Võidupüha	Celebrates the victory in the Battle of Võnnu during the Estonian War of Independence.
24 June	Saint John's Day	Jaanipäev	Jaaniõhtu is celebrated in the night before Midsummer Day.
20 August	Independence Restoration Day	taasiseseisvumispäev	Celebrates Estonia's Restoration of Independence in 1991.
24 December	Christmas Eve	jõululaupäev	
25 December	Christmas Day	esimene jõulupüha	
26 December	Second Day of Christmas	teine jõulupüha	

== National holidays ==
The following holidays do not give a day off:

Date	English Name	Estonian Name	Remarks
6 January	Epiphany	kolmekuningapäev	
2 February	Anniversary of the Tartu Peace Treaty	Tartu rahulepingu aastapäev	Treaty that ended the Estonian War of Independence
14 March	Native Language Day	emakeelepäev	Kristjan Jaak Peterson
Moveable Sunday	Mother's Day	emadepäev	Held on the second Sunday of May.
4 June	Flag Day	Eesti lipu päev	Date when the Flag of Estonia was first consecrated in 1884.
14 June	Day of Mourning and Commemoration	leinapäev	Commemorating the victims of Soviet deportations in 1941 and 1949.
23 August	European Day of Remembrance for Victims of Stalinism and Nazism	kommunismi ja natsismi ohvrite mälestuspäev	Day when the Molotov–Ribbentrop Pact was signed in 1939.
Moveable Sunday	Grandparents' Day	vanavanemate päev	Held on the second Sunday of September.
22 September	Resistance Fighting Day	vastupanuvõitluse päev	Otto Tief's attempt to restore Estonian independence in 1944
1 October	Local Government Day	omavalitsuspäev	
2 November	All Souls' Day	hingedepäev	
Moveable Sunday	Father's Day	isadepäev	Held on the second Sunday of November.
16 November	Day of Declaration of Sovereignty	taassünni päev	Estonian Declaration of Sovereignty, which was issued in 1988.
