= 2023 in Estonia =

- Decades: 2000s; 2010s; 2020s
- See also: Other events of 2023; Timeline of Estonian history

Events in the year 2023 in Estonia.

== Incumbents ==
- President: Alar Karis
- Prime Minister: Kaja Kallas

== Events ==
Ongoing — COVID-19 pandemic in Estonia

=== January ===
- 23 January — Estonia announces the expulsion of the Russian ambassador in Tallinn to reciprocate Russia's expulsion of the Estonian ambassador in Moscow due to a "downgrade" of relations. Both envoys will depart their respective assignments on February 7.

=== March ===
- 5 March — 2023 Estonian parliamentary election: The Reform Party, led by Kaja Kallas, wins the most seats in the Riigikogu.
- 27 March — Estonia joins 30 other countries in signing a joint letter addressed to South Korean President Yoon Suk-yeol, urging South Korea to abolish the death penalty.

=== April ===
- 9 April — 2023 Estonian parliamentary election: Three parties, led by Prime Minister Kaja Kallas, agree to a new government coalition, five weeks after the parliamentary elections in Estonia.

=== May ===
- 9 May — Estonia holds its largest Europe Day celebration in Tallinn with ~10,000 attendees and Ukraine’s Kalush Orchestra, while Victory Day events are smaller and peaceful despite Russian cross-border propaganda.
- 11-13 May — Estonia, represented by Alika with the song "Bridges," competes in Eurovision 2023; Alika places 8th in the final with 168 points.
- 14-26 May — Estonia hosts the UEFA Women’s Under-17 Championship for the first time. France win their first title, beating Spain 3–2 in the final.

=== June ===
- 20 June — Same-sex marriage legalized. The parliament approved amendments to the country's Family Law Act legalizing same-sex marriage and allowing same-sex couples to adopt children. The amended act will go into effect on January 1, 2024. This made Estonia the first Baltic and former USSR country to do so.
- 21-27 June — Estonia sends 105 athletes to the European Games in Kraków, winning gold in archery and Muaythai, and silver in the 400 m hurdles.

=== September ===
- 11 September — Estonia and Latvia sign a €1 billion agreement with Germany to purchase IRIS-T medium-range air defense systems, Estonia’s largest defense investment and shifting its biggest defense partnership from the United States to Germany.

=== October ===
- 9 October - Estonian satellite ESTCube-2 was launched from Kourou, French Guiana, with the European Space Agency's Vega launch vehicle at 4:36 a.m. EEST. The satellite failed to deploy from its launch vehicle, and was destroyed on reentry.
- 10 October – Finland reports that the Balticconnector submarine pipeline connecting Finland and Estonia has been closed following damage and a gas leak.

== Sport ==
Basketball

- 2022–23 European North Basketball League
- 2022–23 Latvian–Estonian Basketball League

Football

Ice hockey

- 2022–23 EML season

== Deaths ==
=== January ===
- 1 January - Kadri Mälk, 64, artist and jewellery designer
- 10 January - Kalle Eller, 82, publisher, cultural researcher and poet
- 7 February - Mati Põldre, 86, film director (Those Old Love Letters, Georg), screenwriter and cinematographer.
