= 2017 in Estonia =

- Decades: 1990s; 2000s; 2010s; 2020s
- See also: Other events of 2017; Timeline of Estonian history

Events in the year 2017 in Estonia.

== Incumbents ==
- President: Kersti Kaljulaid
- Prime Minister: Jüri Ratas

== Events ==
- 3 November to 9 November – The European Space Week is hosted in Tallinn, Estonia.

== Deaths ==
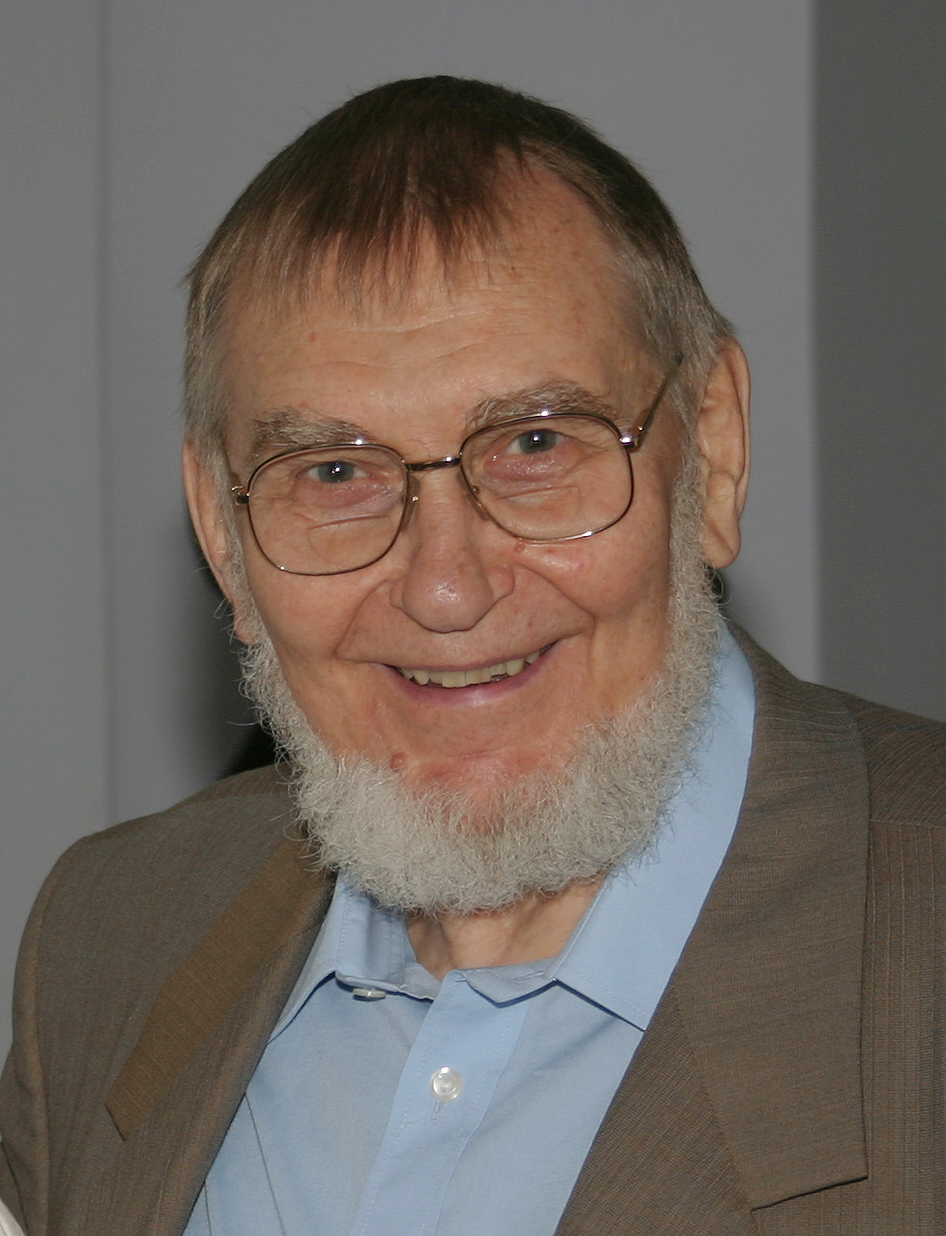
Veljo Tormis

- 1 January – Aleksander Tšutšelov, sailor (b. 1933)
- 21 January – Veljo Tormis, composer (b. 1930)
- 13 May – Salme Poopuu, filmmaker and actress (b. 1939)
- 16 May – Arvo Kukumägi, actor (b. 1958)
- 29 October – Aarne Üksküla, actor and theatre instructor (b. 1937)

== See also ==
- 2017 in Estonian football
- 2017 in Estonian television
