= 2019 in Estonia =

- Decades: 1990s; 2000s; 2010s; 2020s
- See also: Other events of 2019; Timeline of Estonian history

Events of 2019 in Estonia.

== Incumbents ==
- President: Kersti Kaljulaid
- Prime Minister: Jüri Ratas

== Politics ==
- 21–27 February – Advance voting for the parliamentary elections.
- 3 March – Election day for the Parliamentary elections. 63.7% of the population turned out to the polls (–0.5%). Reform (28.9%, +1.2) and Centre (23.1%, –1.7) are stable, EKRE surges (17.8%, +9.7%), Pro Patria decreases (11.4%, –2.3), and the Social-Democrats fall (9.8%, –5.4), down to fifth place. The new party E200 falls short of the electoral threshold (4.4%).
- Government formation:
  - 6–8 March: Talks between Reform and Center, quickly aborted.
  - 8 March: the Reform party approaches SDE and Pro Patria (to build a coalition similar to Taavi Rõivas' second cabinet, which fell in a no-confidence vote)
  - 11 March: Start of coalition talks between Centre Party, EKRE and Pro Patria. The inclusion of EKRE, is the major topic.
  - 16 March: Following pressing demands, Jüri Ratas clarifies that EKRE's inclusion will not challenge Estonia's NATO and EU memberships.
  - 6 April: Coalition negotiations end in an agreement.
  - 15 April: Kaja Kallas, tasked by President Kersti Kaljulaid, tries to form the government. She fails in a 45–53–2–1 vote.
  - 16 April: President Kersti Kaljulaid tasks Jüri Ratas to form the next government
  - 17 April: The coalition agreement is approved by a 55–44 vote.
  - 29 April: Jüri Ratas' second cabinet is sworn in.
- 18 April – President Kersti Kaljulaid meets with Vladimir Putin of Russia in Moscow, after the inauguration of the newly restored Embassy of Estonia in Moscow. It marks the first meeting between leaders of the two countries since 2011. Estonia wishes to secure Russia's absence of veto for the nearing 2019 United Nations Security Council election.

== Society ==
- Obesity rates continues to rise in Estonia. "Our increase in overweight and obesity began later than in many other European countries, but we have caught up to them quickly," explained Haidi Kanamäe, head of nutrition and exercise at the National Institute for Health Development (TAI)."

== Culture ==
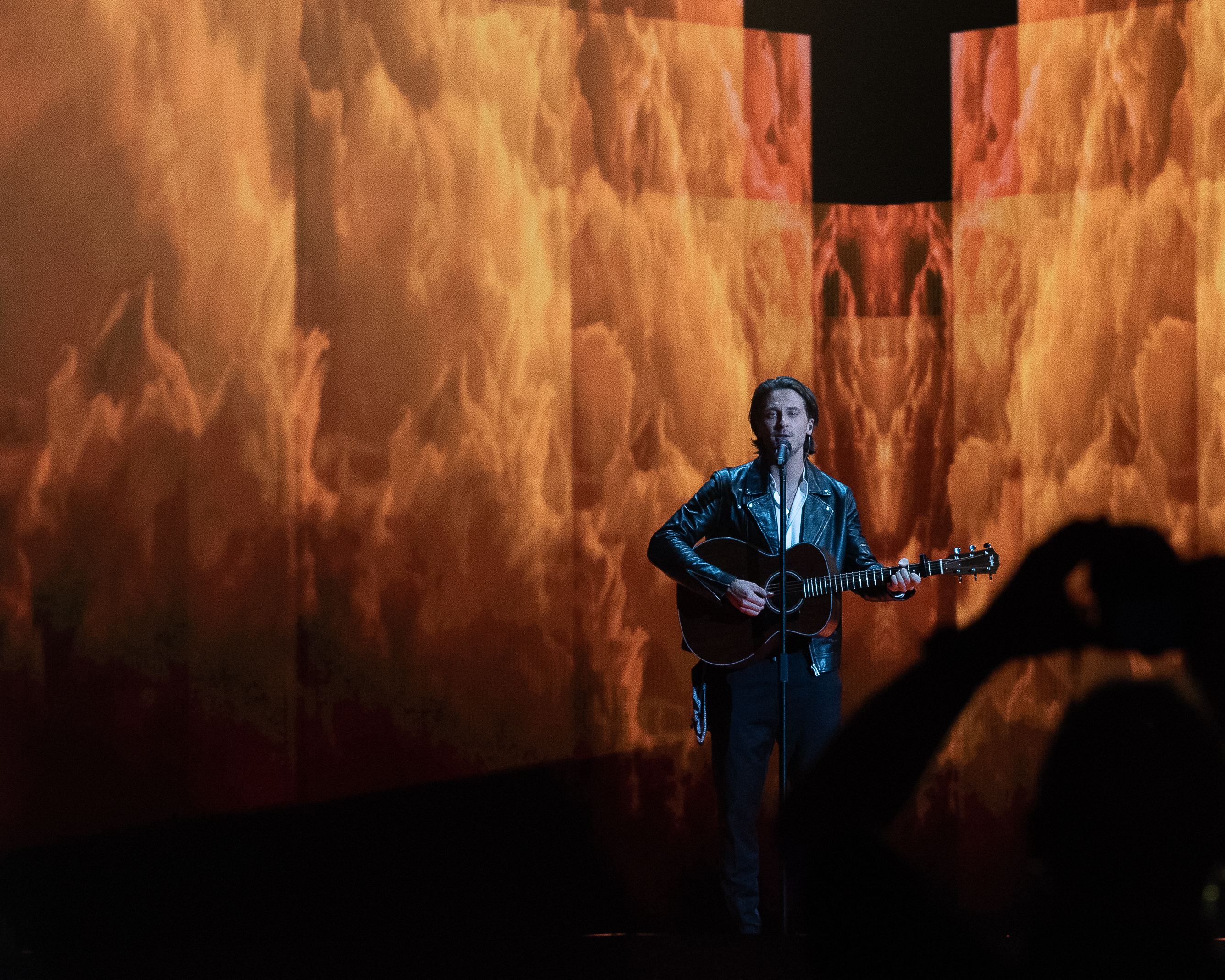
Victor Crone performing "Storm" at the Eurovision Song Contest 2019.

- February 22: Tanel Toom's film 'Truth and Justice' (Estonian: Tõde ja Õigus) is released, and sets a box office record for opening weekend attendance with a total cinema audience of over 50,000.
- May 14–19; Estonia participated in the Eurovision Song Contest 2019 with Victor Crone performed with the song "Storm" and finished 20th in the final.
- 29 September: The archaeological remains of 100 Viking swords were discovered in North Estonia, the largest collection of such artefacts to date.

== Sport ==
- February: A doping scandal erupts at the FIS Nordic World Skiing Championship in Austria, leading to the arrests of Estonian skiers Karel Tammjärv, Andreas Veerpalu and Algo Kärp, as well as two members of coaching staff.

== Deaths ==
- May 21 - Jüri Aarma actor (b. 1951)

== See also ==
- 2019 in Estonian football
- 2019 in Estonian television
