= 2016 in Estonia =

- Decades: 1990s; 2000s; 2010s; 2020s
- See also: Other events of 2016; Timeline of Estonian history

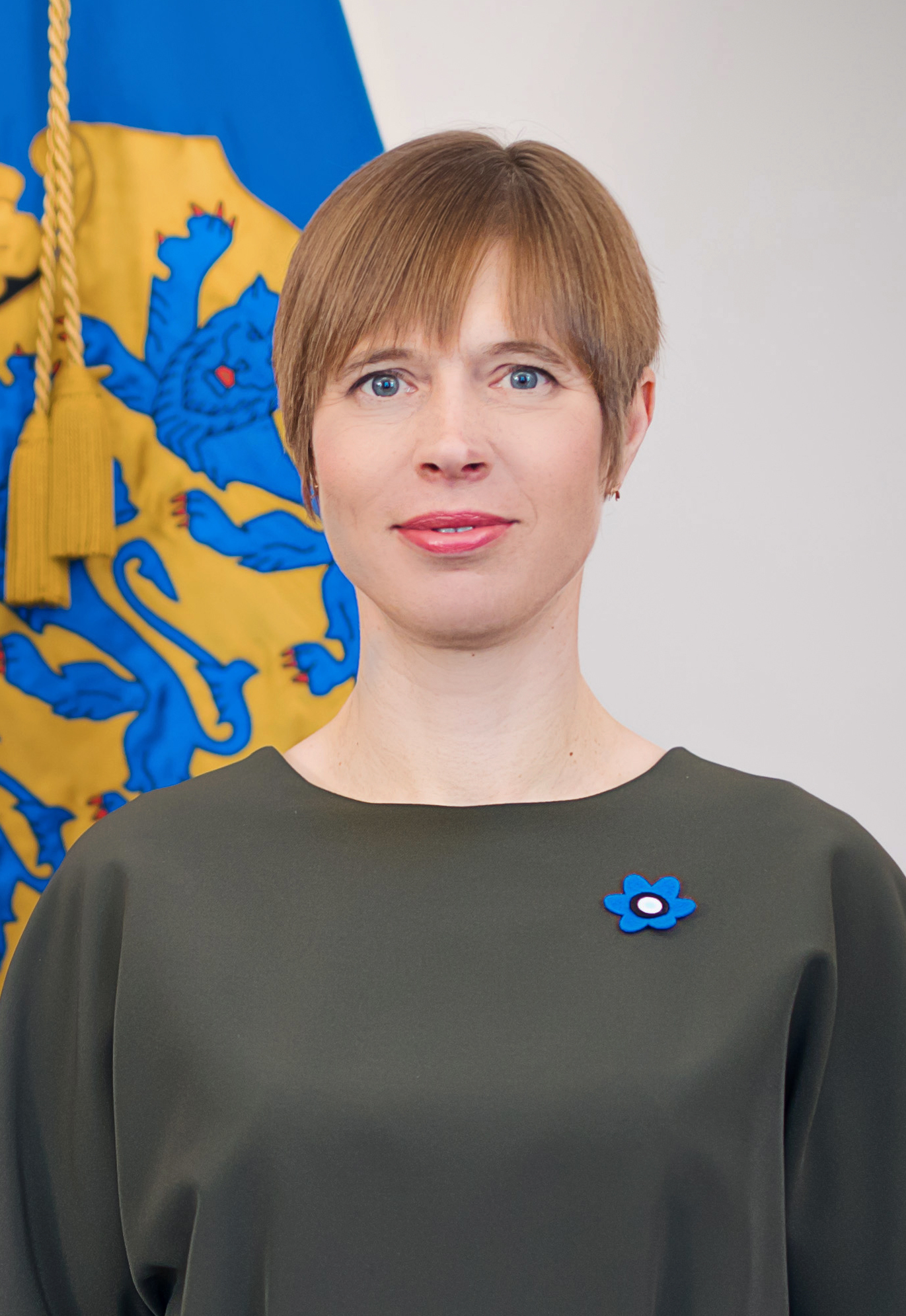
Kersti Kaljulaid, elected president in 2016

Events in the year 2016 in Estonia.

== Incumbents ==
- President: Toomas Hendrik Ilves (until 10 October), Kersti Kaljulaid (starting 10 October)
- Prime Minister: Taavi Rõivas (until 23 November), Jüri Ratas (starting 23 November)

== October ==
Kersti Kaljulaid becomes the fifth president of Estonia.

- Estonia in the Eurovision Song Contest 2016
- July - 2016 Rally Estonia
- August 5–21 - Estonian athletes competed at the 2016 Summer Olympics in Rio de Janeiro, Brazil

== See also ==
- 2016 in Estonian football
- 2016 in Estonian television
