= 2017 in Estonian television =

This is a list of Estonian television related events from 2017.

== Events ==
- Eesti Laul 2017. Semi-finals took place on 11 and 18 February. The final took place on 4 March in Saku Suurhall.

== Deaths ==
- 29 October – Aarne Üksküla, actor (b. 1937)

== See also ==
- 2017 in Estonia
