= 2020 in Estonian television =

This is a list of Estonian television related events from 2020.

== Events ==
- Eesti Laul 2020

== See also ==
- 2020 in Estonia
