= 2015 in Estonian television =

This is a list of Estonian television related events from 2015.

== Events ==
- 21 February - Elina Born and Stig Rästa are selected to represent Estonia at the 2015 Eurovision Song Contest with their song "Goodbye to Yesterday". They are selected to be the twenty-first Estonian Eurovision entry during Eesti Laul held at the Nordea Concert Hall in Tallinn.
- 31 May - Jüri Pootsmann wins the sixth season of Eesti otsib superstaari.
- 28 September - Launch of ETV+

== Television shows ==
=== 1990s ===
- Õnne 13 (1993–present)

=== 2000s ===
- Eesti otsib superstaari (2007–present)

== Deaths ==
- 29 October – Herta Elviste (born 1923), actress

== See also ==
- 2015 in Estonia
