= 2015 in Estonia =

- Decades: 1990s; 2000s; 2010s; 2020s
- See also: Other events of 2015; Timeline of Estonian history

The following lists events and other items of interest occurring during 2015 in Estonia.

== Incumbents ==
- President: Toomas Hendrik Ilves
- Prime Minister: Taavi Rõivas

== Events ==
=== March ===
- 1 March - Parliamentary elections are held. The ruling Reform Party wins the elections, but loses the majority that it has had with its current coalition partner, the Social Democratic Party; for the first time in many years, two new parties cross the election threshold, the right-of-centre Free Party and the eurosceptic Conservative People's Party of Estonia.

== Deaths ==
- 27 January - Vladimir-Georg Karasjov-Orgusaar, 83, film director
- 21 June - Arved Viirlaid, 93, Estonian-Canadian writer
- 30 July - Endel Lippmaa, 84, scientist and politician

== See also ==
- 2015 in Estonian television
