= 2018 in Estonia =

- Decades: 1990s; 2000s; 2010s; 2020s
- See also: Other events of 2018; Timeline of Estonian history

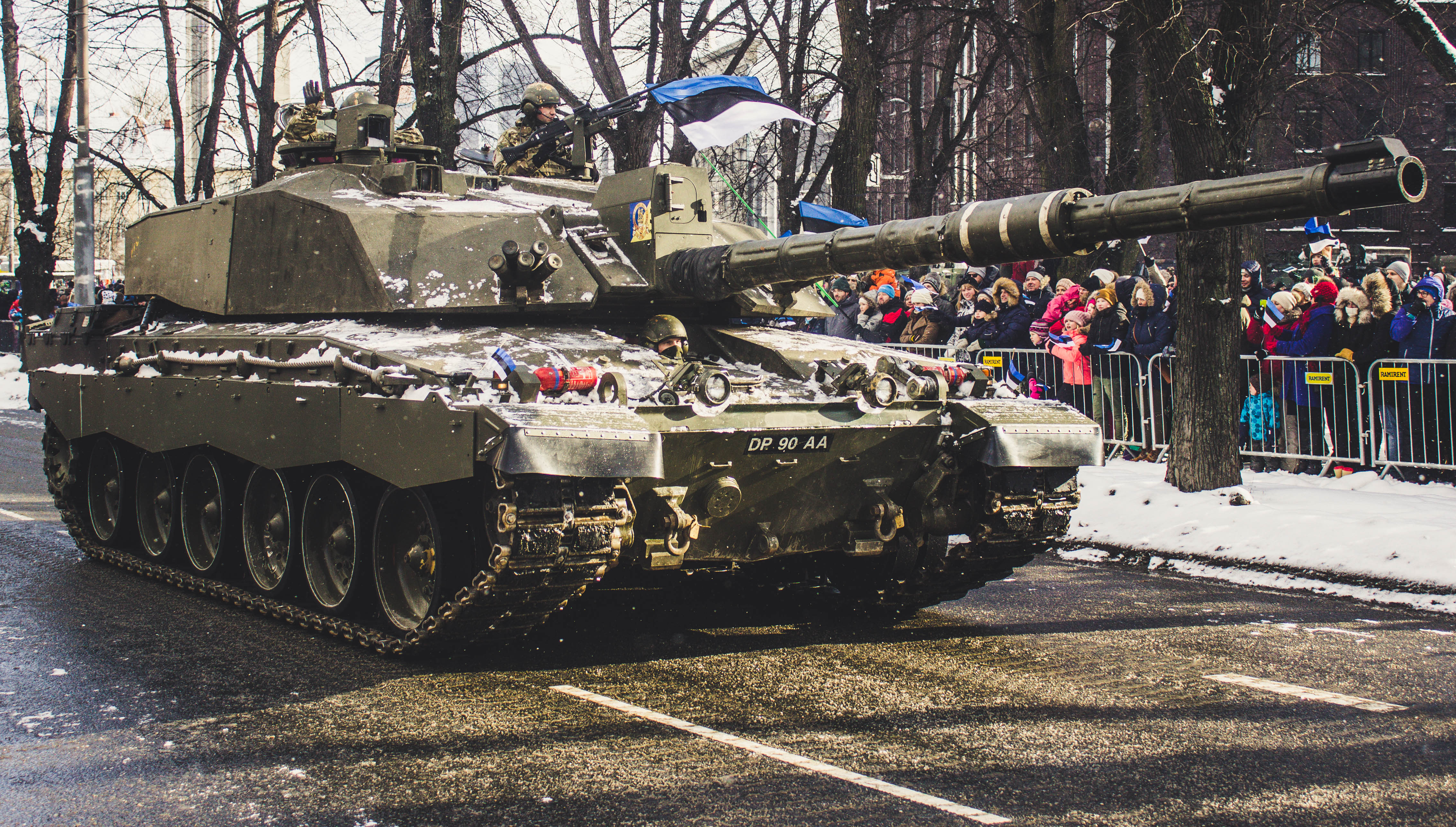
A British Army Challenger 2 main battle tank (presumably of the Kings Royal Hussars) seen at a parade in Estonia

Events in the year 2018 in Estonia.

== Incumbents ==
- President: Kersti Kaljulaid
- Prime Minister: Jüri Ratas

== Deaths ==
- 16 February – Heli Lääts (born 1932), singer
- 22 August – Tullio Ilomets (born 1921), chemist and science historian
- 23 October – Rein Põder (born 1943), writer
- 6 December – Pete Shelley (born 1955), British musician

== See also ==
- 2018 in Estonian football
- 2018 in Estonian television
