= List of Estonian war films =

Estonian war films

This is the list of war films produced in Estonia during the period of independence from 1918 to 1940 and from 1991 and beyond. The first Estonian war film was produced in 1927.

== Chronicle list ==
=== 1920s ===
Estonian title	English title	Director	Genre	Producer	Notes
1927
Noored Kotkad	Young Eagles	Theodor Luts	adventure	Siirius Film	The first film about the Estonian war of Independence. Mass scenes with more than 4000 soldiers.

=== 1930s ===
Estonian title	English title	Director	Genre	Producer	Notes
1933
Eesti Vabariigi 15. aastapäeva paraad	The 15th Anniversary parade of the Republic of Estonia		review	Eesti Kultuurfilm	Military parade on the Square of Freedom in Tallinn.
1935
Kaitseliidu päevad Tallinnas	Defence League Days in Tallinn		review	Eesti Kultuurfilm	Defence Leagues summer days in Tallinn.
1936
Kaitseliidu Sakala manöövrid	Defence League Sakala Manoeuvres		review	Eesti Kultuurfilm	Military exercises in South-Estonia.
1937
Kindluste linn Narva	The Fortification City of Narva		review	Eesti Kultuurfilm	Narvas military strongholds and fortification systems.
1938
Ringkäik Sõjamuuseumis	Review in the Museum of War		review	Eesti Kultuurfilm	Educational review film about the Estonian Museum of War.
1938
Relvastatud rahvas	Armed Nation		adventure	Eesti Kultuurfilm	Propaganda film.
Võitluses sündinud, rahus kasvanud	Born in Fight, Raised in Peace		adventure	Eesti Kultuurfilm	Propaganda film.
1939
Au langenuile	Glory to the Fallen		documentary	Eesti Kultuurfilm	Monuments of the Estonian War of Independence.
Päev Sõjakoolis	A Day in the School of War		review	Eesti Kultuurfilm	Educational review film about the School of War.

=== 1940s ===
Estonian title	English title	Director	Genre	Producer	Notes
1940
Allveelaevad harjutustegevusel	Submarines on the Exercises		review	Eesti Kultuurfilm	The Estonian Navy submarine fleet on the military exercises.
Merevägi harjutustegevusel	Navy on the Exercises		review	Eesti Kultuurfilm	The Estonian Navy surface fleet on the military exercises.

=== 1990s ===
Estonian title	English title	Director	Genre	Producer	Notes
1995
Wikmani poisid	Wikman Boys	Vilja Palm	drama serial	Eesti Televisioon	A drama serial about the Wikman Private Gymnasium students from 1937 till their mobilization in 1944. .
1997
Me elasime Eesti nimel	We Lived for Estonia	Andres Sööt	documentary	Monofilm	A film about the Estonian partisans fight against the Soviet occupation during and after the World War II.

=== 2000s ===
Estonian title	English title	Director	Genre	Producer	Notes
2000
Meie sõdurid	Our Soldiers		serial	EDF	A propaganda serial about the armed forces of Estonia.
2001
Uue Eesti sõdurid	New Estonia's Soldiers	Erik Boltowski	review	Erik Boltowski EDF	A propaganda film about the 10th anniversary of the Estonian Defence Force restoration.
2002
Nimed marmortahvlil	Names in Marble	Elmo Nüganen	adventure	Taska Productions	Based on an acclaimed 1935 novel about the War of Liberation that ensured Estonia's independence. The film tells about a group of young schoolboys heading to the front to fight the army of Soviet Russia.
Baltic Eagle 2002	Baltic Eagle 2002	Erik Boltowski	review	Erik Boltowski EDF	A propaganda film about the Estonian Defence Forces military exercises.
2003
Somnambuul	Somnambulance	Sulev Keedus	war drama	F-Seitse Kinotar	Autumn 1944, Estonia. Tens of thousands of people leave their homeland in fear of approaching Soviet frontline...
Presidendi kaardivägi	The President's Guard	Erik Boltowski	review	Erik Boltowski EDF	Propaganda documentary about the Guard Battalion.
2004
Rahuvägi	A Force For Peace	Erik Boltowski	review	Erik Boltowski EDF	Propaganda documentary about the Estonian Peacekeepers.
Scoutspataljon	The Scouts Battalion	Erik Boltowski	review	Erik Boltowski EDF	Propaganda documentary about the Scouts Battalion.
2005
Haukka Grupp	Haukka Group	René Vilbre	documentary	Ruut Pictures	A tragic story about hope, betrayal and double game, and how it all befell the Estonian spies who fought for their homeland.
Võitlus sinimustvalge eest - Sinine	Fight for Blue-Black-White - Blue	Toomas Lepp	documentary	ETV	A documentary trilogy about the fight for the restoration of the independence.
Võitlus sinimustvalge eest - Must	Fight for Blue-Black-White - Black	Toomas Lepp	documentary	ETV	A documentary trilogy about the fight for the restoration of the independence.
Võitlus sinimustvalge eest - Valge	Fight for Blue-Black-White - White	Toomas Lepp	documentary	ETV	A documentary trilogy about the fight for the restoration of the independence.
2006
Sinimäed	Blue Hills	Raimo Jõerand	documentary	Ruut Pictures	A story on the Estonian Legions defense against the Soviet Army in 1944 with an emphasis on its last stand in the region known as the Blue Hills of Estonia.
Võidupüha Mereparaad	Victory Day Naval Parade		review	ETV	The Estonian Navy and NATO naval parade.
Tuletoojad	The Flame Of Victory	Erik Boltowski	review	Erik Boltowski EDF	Propaganda documentary about the Estonian Defence League.
Täiskäik edasi	Full Speed Ahead	Erik Boltowski	review	Erik Boltowski EDF	Propaganda documentary about the Estonian Navy development.
Mehed unustatud armeest	The Forgotten Soldiers	Kalle Käesel	documentary	Osakond	A documentary about a top secret Estonian Guard Company nr.4421. The unit existed from 1946 to 1963 in Nurnberg.
2007
Scoutspataljon - Respekt	Scoutsbattalion - Respect		commercial	EDF	A short propaganda video for the Scoutsbattalion recruiting campaign.
2008
Detsembrikuumus	December Heat	Asko Kase	war drama	Ruut Pictures	A war drama film about the 1924 1 September Soviet coup attempt in Estonia.

=== 2010s ===
Estonian title	English title	Director	Genre	Producer	Notes
2015
1944	1944	Elmo Nüganen	war drama	Taska Film	Estonian soldiers in both the Soviet Army and the German Army have to choose sides and thus fight against their fellow countrymen during World War II.
