= 2019 in Estonian television =

This is a list of Estonian television related events from 2018.

== Events ==
- Eesti Laul 2019

== See also ==
- 2019 in Estonia
