= 2026 Estonian education workers' strike =

Labour dispute in Estonia

- 2026 nationwide education workers' protest in Estonia
- Date: September 22, 2026
- Location: Estonia (Nationwide)

Parties
Estonian Education Workers' Union (EHL)	Government of Estonia

Lead figures
Reemo Voltri	

Number
Approx. 15,000 education workers	

On September 22, 2026, around 15,000 education workers (including teachers) in Estonia held a one-hour strike, causing schools to start an hour late.

Reemo Voltri, chairman of the Estonian Educations Workers' Union (EHL), said that the action was a last resort and that the negotiations had not brought salary targets closer.

== Demand ==
The union is demanding that the minimum salary for education workers at general education and vocational schools rise to at least €2,312 in 2027, the projected level of Estonia's average wage. The salary of kindergarten teachers must be at least 90% of that, or €2,081, it said, referring to monthly gross pay.

== Timeline ==
September 17, 2026: The public broadcaster Eesti Rahvusringhääling reports on plans for a nationwide warning strike.

September 22, 2026: The strike occurred, delaying school openings by an hour.

October 12, 2026: The EHL and the Ministry of Education and Research began negotiations on a collective agreement for the country's state-run general education schools.
