= Kihnu Virve =

Estonian folk singer (1928–2022)

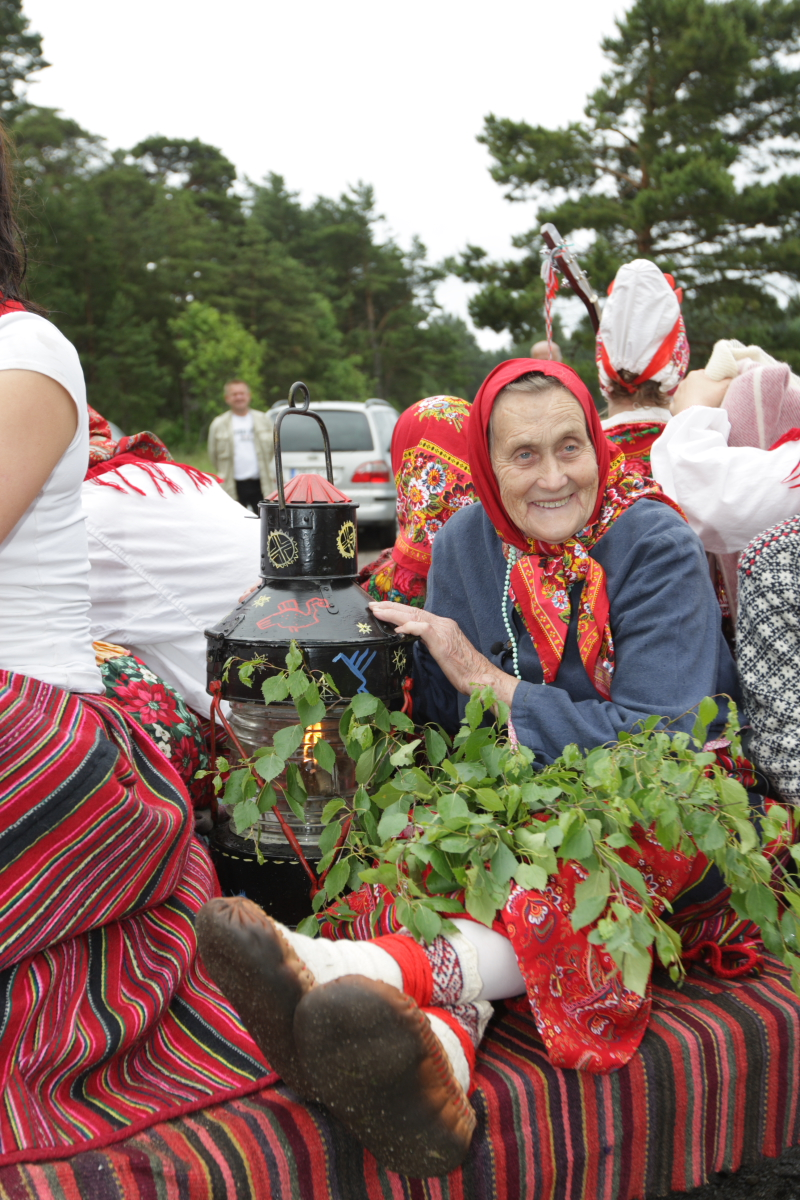
Estonian folk musician Kihnu Virve in 2009

Virve-Elfriide Köster (née Haavik; 30 January 1928 – 10 December 2022), best known as Kihnu Virve, was an Estonian folk singer. Her songs are among the top-selling folk music in Estonia.

== Biography ==
Virve Köster was born Virve Haavik in 1928 in Pärnu, Estonia, the closest large city to her home island of Kihnu. As a performer, she went by the name Kihnu Virve.

Virve lived in a log cabin on the small women-dominated island of Kihnu. She was the island's best-known songwriter and one of its most famous residents.

Virve began writing songs at age 15, and she went on to write over 300 of them. She composed the songs, both melody and lyrics, in her head, then wrote them down later. The songs often drew from her own life and experiences, as well as describing the island residents' unique lifestyle. Stylistically, they resemble traditional music from her youth in the 1930s–60s.

After writing and performing music for family and friends for decades, Virve reinvented herself in her seventies and found widespread success as a folk musician, becoming one of Estonia's top-selling female folk singers. Perhaps her best-known song is "Merepidu" ("Feast of the Sea"), which was first brought to national attention through a cover by the Tallinn-based folk group Kukerpillid.

Virve remained physically active, notably going sky-diving at age 81 in 2009, reportedly becoming the first person from Kihnu to make a parachute jump. She toured the country, often performing alongside her family.

A Kihnu Veeteed ferry is named after her. In 2011, she was given the Order of the White Star, Fifth Class, for her cultural contributions.

Virve died on 10 December 2022, at the age of 94.
