= Ave Alavainu =

Estonian poet (1942–2022)

Ave Alavainu (4 October 1942 – 3 April 2022) was an Estonian poet and writer. She was born in Tartu on 4 October 1942 and died on 3 April 2022 at the age of 79. She attended the Tallinn Pedagogical Institute (1962–64), studying Estonian philology, and Tartu State University (1964–67).
