= Uno Laur =

Estonian singer

- Born: Uno Laur; 8 June 1961; Rakvere, then part of Estonian SSR, Soviet Union
- Died: 17 March 2025 (aged 63)

Uno Laur (8 June 1961 − 17 March 2025) was an Estonian former lead singer of the Must Mamba and Röövel Ööbik, remembered in his time as "the oldest punk in Estonia".
