= Kristjan Svirgsden =

Estonian film director (1954–2026)

- Born: 13 September 1954; Tallinn, then part of Estonian SSR, Soviet Union
- Died: 16 July 2026 (aged 71); Estonia
- Education: Tallinn Pedagogical Institute
- Occupations: Cinematographer, Film director
- Years active: 1972–2026

Kristjan Svirgsden (13 September 1954 – 16 July 2026) was an Estonian film director, cinematographer, documentary filmmaker and columnist.

== Life and career ==
Kristjan Svirgsden was born on 13 September 1954, in Tallinn. He graduated from Tallinn Pedagogical Institute in 1987 with a degree in cultural education, specializing in directing studies.

From 1972 to 1993, Svirgsden worked at Eesti Telefilm, where he started as the assistant cameraman and later worked as a cameraman and director. During his time working, he participated in the production of several documentaries and television films. In 1987, he applied as the member of the Estonian Film Association .

In 1993, Svirgsden founded the production company Svirgsden OÜ. He continued to work as a director and cameraman. In 1995–1997, he was the director and cameraman of the nature program Ozone. In 1998–2002, he worked as an operator for the Finnish Public Broadcasting Company Yle. From 2002 to 2007, he worked as a freelance cameraman, contributing to Estonian television channels and several foreign television organizations, including Finnish, Swedish, Norwegian and North Macedonian television channels, as well as the BBC and Deutsche Welle.

Svirgsden died on 16 July 2026, at the age of 71.

== Filmography ==
- 1984: "Panen aga põsepuna palgele" (Eesti Telefilm)
- 1987: "Mälestuskuurort" (Eesti Telefilm)
- 1987: "Võõrad öös" (Eesti Telefilm)
- 1998: "Roheline Kunda" (Svirgsden OÜ / YLE TV-2 / BBC)
- 2006: "Kuutõbised" (Svirgsden OÜ)
- 2009: "Disko ja tuumasõda" (Kiur Aarma / Hardi Volmer)
- 2010: "Kalevite kanged pojad" (Svirgsden OÜ)
- 2012: "Tõsise näoga mees" (Svirgsden OÜ)
- 2013: "Okupeeri oma müür" (Peeter Vihma / Artur Talvik)
- 2014: "Heinz Valk" (Svirgsden OÜ)
