= Ago Kalde =

Estonian Volleyball player and coach (1945–2025)

Ago Kalde (29 December 1945 – 21 August 2025) was an Estonian volleyball player and coach.

== Biography ==
Kalde graduated in 1964 from Tallinn Secondary School No. 10 and 1969.

During his sports career, he played for the team at the Tallinn Pedagogical Institute (now Tallinn University) from 1964 to 1969 and for Tallinna Kalev from 1969 to 1971. In 1971, he became the Estonian champion and won the Estonian Cup in both 1969 and 1971.

After his playing career, Kalde worked as a volleyball coach at Tallinna Kalev from 1971 to 1977. He coached the Estonian women's team at the 1971 and 1975 Spartakiads and the 1977 All-Union Youth Games. He also coached the Kalev and Flora women's teams in the Estonian and Soviet Union championships.

From 1977 to 1984, Kalde was the chairman of the Tallinn City Council of Kalev and then, from 1984 to 1989, the director of the Kalev Sports Hall. From 1989 to 2000, he worked as the director of Tallinn City Hall and from 2004 to 2018 as the managing director of OÜ TTÜ Sport.

He was an active member of sports management: from 1982 to 1992 and from 1996 to 2002, he was a member of the presidium and board of Kalev and from 1989 to 1991 he was also a member of the presidium of the Estonian Volleyball Federation.

Kalde died on 21 August 2025, at the age of 79.
