= Priit Jaagant =

Estonian business executive (1972-2025)

- Born: 31 July 1972; Estonia
- Died: 17 May 2025 (aged 52); Eura, Finland
- Occupation: Businessman

Priit Jaagant (31 July 1972 – 17 May 2025) was an Estonian business executive.

== Life and career ==
Jaagant graduated from Nõo High School in 1990 and from Tallinn University of Technology in 1995, majoring in construction.

He was a member of the board of several companies, including the private limited company Mapri Ehitus and the non-profit organization Eesti Karate-Do Shotokai. Until 2010, he served as the chairman of the board of the public limited company Nordecon.

=== Mountaineering ===
In 1994, Jaagant took part in the first Estonian expedition to the Matterhorn (4477 m) in the Alps (group leader Erika Ader), during which seven Estonian alpinists, including Priit Jaagant, climbed the classic Hörnli route to the top of the mountain.

=== Death ===
Jaagant died with his wife along with three others, on 17 May 2025, in a mid-air helicopter crash near Eura Airfield in Finland. He was 52.
