= Health Board (Estonia) =

Government agency of Estonia

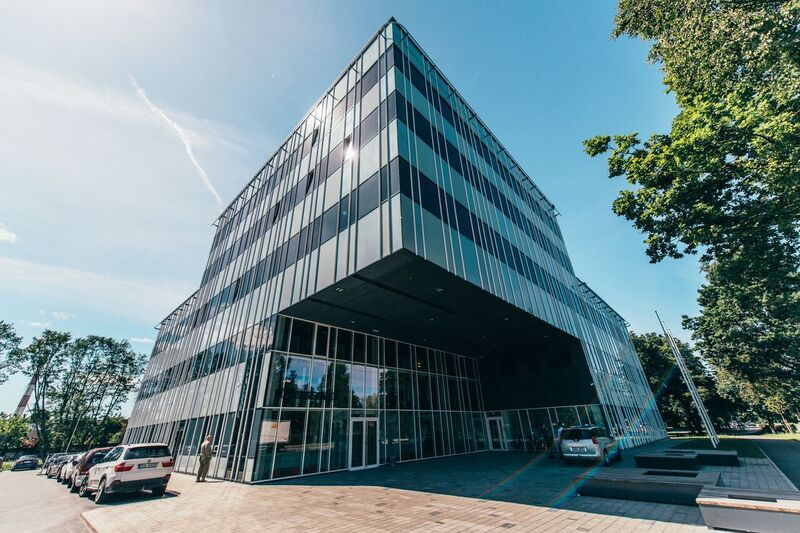
Estonian Health Board (headquarters), Paldiski maantee 81, Tallinn

The Estonian Health Board is an Estonian governmental agency in the area of responsibility of the Ministry of Social Affairs. The agency contributes to health care and ensures health protection, environmental health, chemical safety, and the safety of medical devices in Estonia through preemptive and complaint-based supervision in the aforementioned domains. Additionally, the agency provides chargeable laboratory services to for example determine drinking water quality.

== History ==
The Health Board was created by law in 2010 with three predecessor agencies (Health Protection Inspectorate (Estonian: Tervisekaitseinspektsioon), Health Board (Estonian: Tervishoiuamet), and Chemicals Notification Centre (Estonian: Kemikaalide teabekeskus)) merging into one.

== Work ==
The Estonian Health Board has been publishing yearly overviews of its activities in the field of health protection since 2012.

== Organisation and locations ==
Apart from its headquarters in Tallinn, which inter alia hosts the department responsible for Northern Estonia, the agency has three other regional departments in Pärnu, Tartu, and Kohtla-Järve. Additionally, the Health Board has agencies in Rapla, Paide, Tartu, Põltsamaa, Räpina, Valga, Viljandi, Võru, Pärnu, Kuressaare, Kärdla, Haapsalu, Kohtla-Järve, Rakvere, and Narva.

The Health Board is managed by a general director. In 2017, Merike Jürilo followed Tiiu Aro in this position. In the summer of 2020, Jürilo announced her resignation, and in autumn, Üllar Lanno was appointed as the new general director.
