= Võidupüha =

Public holiday in Estonia commemorating victory in the Battle of Cēsis (23 June 1934)

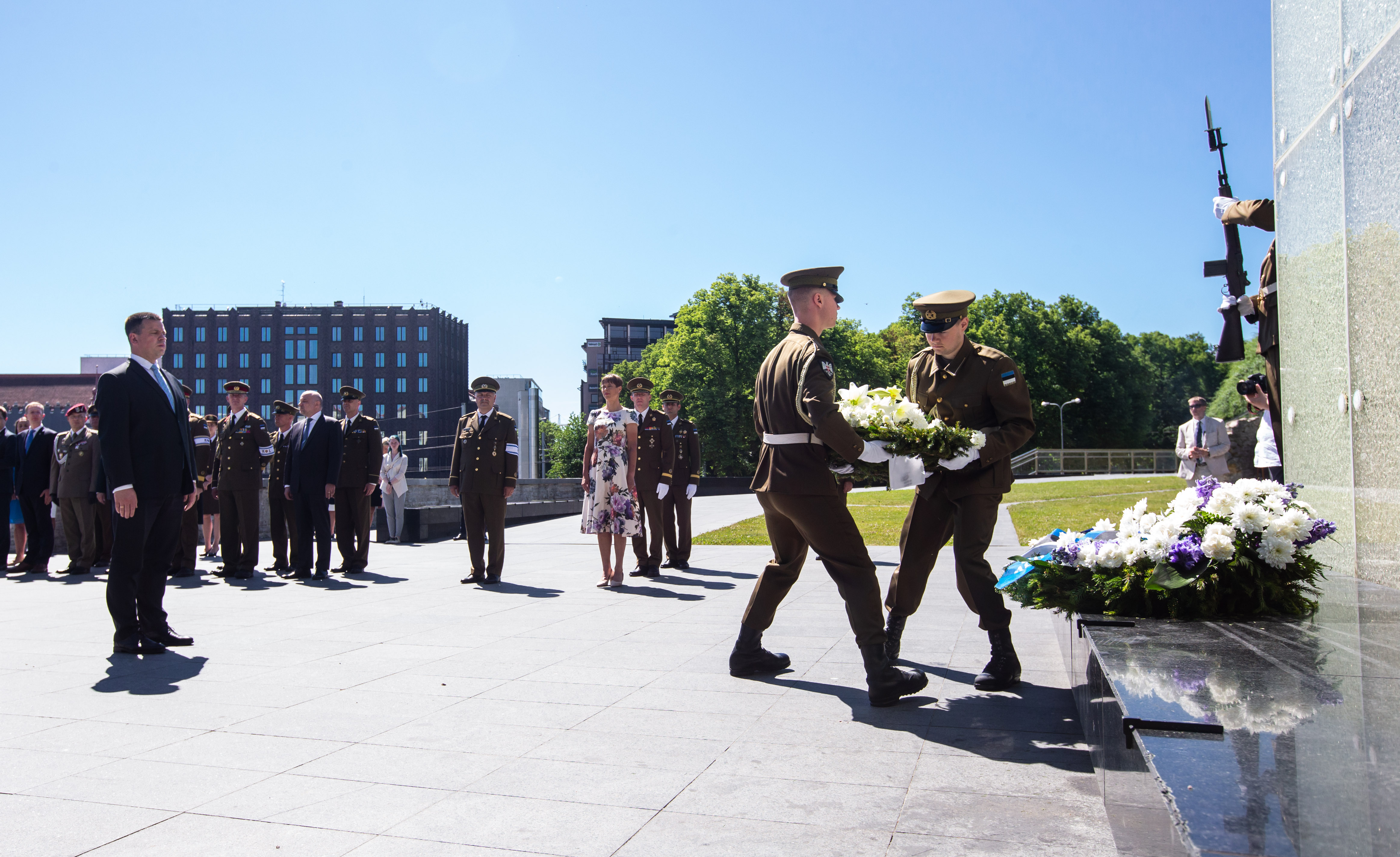
Official celebration of Victory Day in the capital 2020

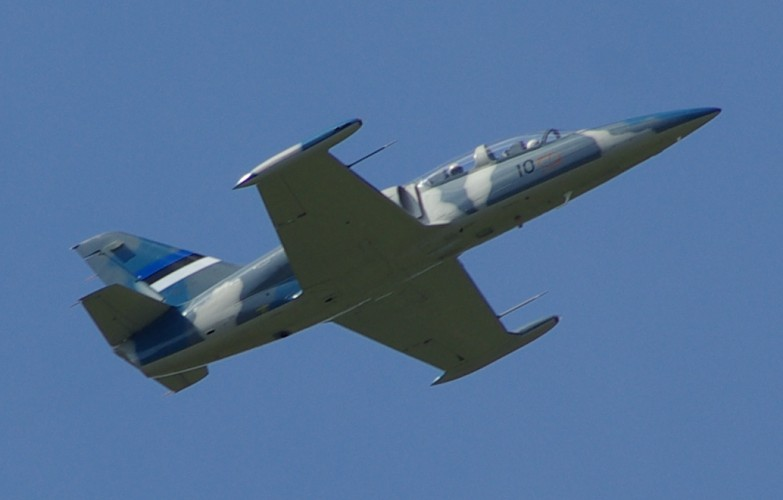
An Aero L-39 Albatros during the 2007 parade in Rapla

Võidupüha (or Victory Day in English or the Victory Day in the Battle of Võnnu in Estonian) is a public holiday in Estonia which occurs on June 23. The holiday has been celebrated since 1934 and marks the victory of Estonia and neighboring Latvia in the Battle of Cēsis against the Baltische Landeswehr on June 23, 1919.

== History ==
The battle was part of the 1918–1920 Estonian War of Independence, in which the new Estonian government fought the Soviet Union's Red Army and the Baltische Landeswehr, which consisted of Baltic German nobility from Courland and the Governorate of Livonia who served the German Empire and aimed to establish the United Baltic Duchy. After the fighting began on 19 June, the combined force of the 3rd Division (the Kuperjanov Infantry Partisan Battalion and the Latvian Northern Brigade) held out for reinforcements arriving on 21 June despite the fact that they did not have the advantage when it came to weaponry (German troops had 5,500–6,300 infantry, 500–600 cavalry as well as a high number of cannons and mortars). On 23 June, after pushing back the last of the German attacks, the combined contingent staged a large counter-attack which resulted in the recapture of Cēsis (Võnnu in Estonian). After this event, Major General Ernst Põdder ordered his command of the day, "the victories won over our stagnant and surrendered enemy, in cities and in the countryside, flags and armed units in the local garrisons were set up." On 16 February 1934, the Riigikogu decided to turn the 23rd of June into a national holiday. The holiday was banned by the new Soviet authorities in Estonia after the USSR re-established Soviet rule over Estonia in 1944. It was also banned by the previous German occupation of Estonia during World War II. It became legal to celebrate Võidupüha again after Estonia regained its independence. The first celebrations of the holiday took place in 1992, in the yard of Kadriorg Palace.

== Observances ==
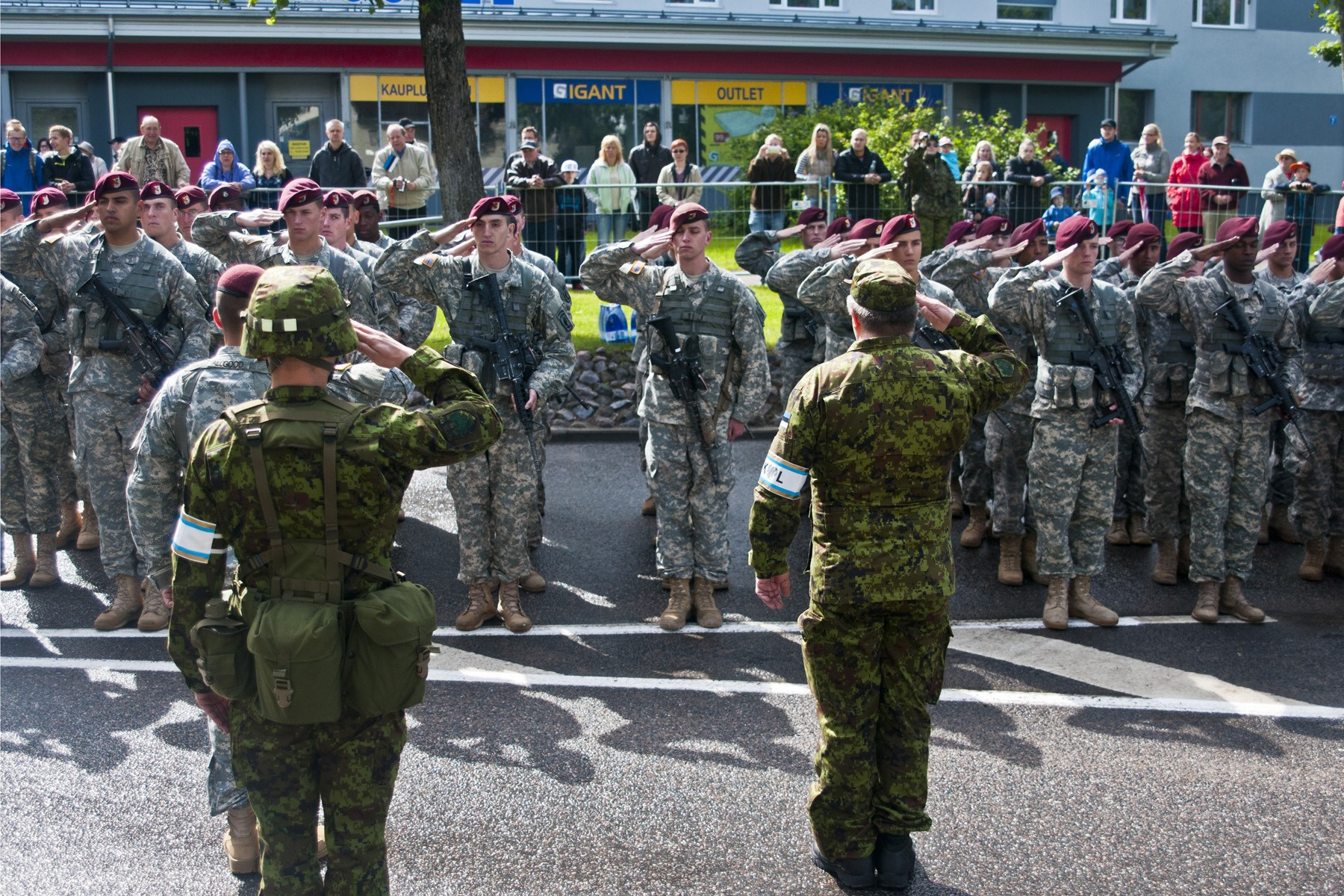
American paratroopers from the 173rd Airborne Brigade marching in 2014 Estonian Võidupüha parade.

Võidupüha parades
Year	City	President	Notes
1994	Tartu	Lennart Meri	
1995	Pärnu	Lennart Meri	
1996	Narva	Lennart Meri	
1997	Võru	Lennart Meri	
1998	Viljandi	Lennart Meri	
1999	Valga	Lennart Meri	
2000	Haapsalu	Lennart Meri	
2001	Pärnu	Lennart Meri	
2002	Põlva	Arnold Rüütel	
2003	Jõhvi	Arnold Rüütel	
2004	Rakvere	Arnold Rüütel	
2005	Paide	Arnold Rüütel	
2006	Saaremaa	Arnold Rüütel	The first Fleet Review (Mereparaad) of the Estonian Navy in Estonian history was conducted during the 2006 parade. ETV filmed Võidupüha Mereparaad (Victory Day Naval Parade), which was a documentary on the Estonian/NATO naval parade on Võidupüha that year.
2007	Rapla	Toomas Hendrik Ilves	
2008	Tallinn	Toomas Hendrik Ilves	
2009	Jõgeva	Toomas Hendrik Ilves	
2010	Viljandi	Toomas Hendrik Ilves	
2011	Tartu	Toomas Hendrik Ilves	
2012	Pärnu	Toomas Hendrik Ilves	It was the biggest parade since 1992. It was the third time Pärnu has hosted the parade.
2013	Haapsalu	Toomas Hendrik Ilves	
2014	Valga	Toomas Hendrik Ilves	
2015	Kärdla	Toomas Hendrik Ilves	The 2015 parade also saw a rising number of military contingents from NATO countries take part, including Latvia, the United States, Finland, Poland and Sweden.
2016	Võru	Toomas Hendrik Ilves	Aside from American and Latvian troops, the parade also featured new foreign contingents from Lithuania and Denmark. The Pipe Band of the Sakala Subdivision of Defence League performed in the Victory Day parade alongside the Band of the Estonian Defence Forces to provide musical accompaniment.
2017	Rakvere	Kersti Kaljulaid	
2018	Tallinn	Kersti Kaljulaid	It was attended by Georgian president Giorgi Margvelashvili and Icelandic president Guðni Thorlacius Jóhannesson.
2019	Tartu	Kersti Kaljulaid	It marked the centennial jubilee of the Battle of Cēsis. The parade was for the first time, arranged by service branch instead of district units. Aircraft from the Hungarian Air Force and the Royal Air Force also took part in the parade as part of the larger foreign contingents.
2020	Cancelled due to COVID-19		
2021	Paide	Kersti Kaljulaid	
2022	Kuressaare	Alar Karis	
2023	Viljandi	Alar Karis	
2024	Narva	Alar Karis	
2025	Pärnu	Alar Karis	
2026	Rapla	Alar Karis	

Joint celebrations are observed by both the Estonian Defence Forces and the Latvian National Armed Forces being that it was a joint victory between the two countries. Despite this, Estonia celebrates Victory Day more as a national holiday and event unlike their Latvian counterparts. Celebrations of Võidupüha has been organized by the Estonian Defence League since 2000. Ceremonially, the holiday is also tied to St John's Day (Jaaniõhtu) on June 24, celebrating the summer solstice observances and the Nativity of Saint John the Baptist.

The traditional lighting of a fire by the Estonian President on the morning of Victory Day was restored after the Soviet occupation. From this fire, the flame of independence would be carried across the country to light the many other bonfires in other cities. By Estonian laws, all national symbols must be present, which requires that the state flags are not to be lowered on any government buildings during the night that passes between these two days.

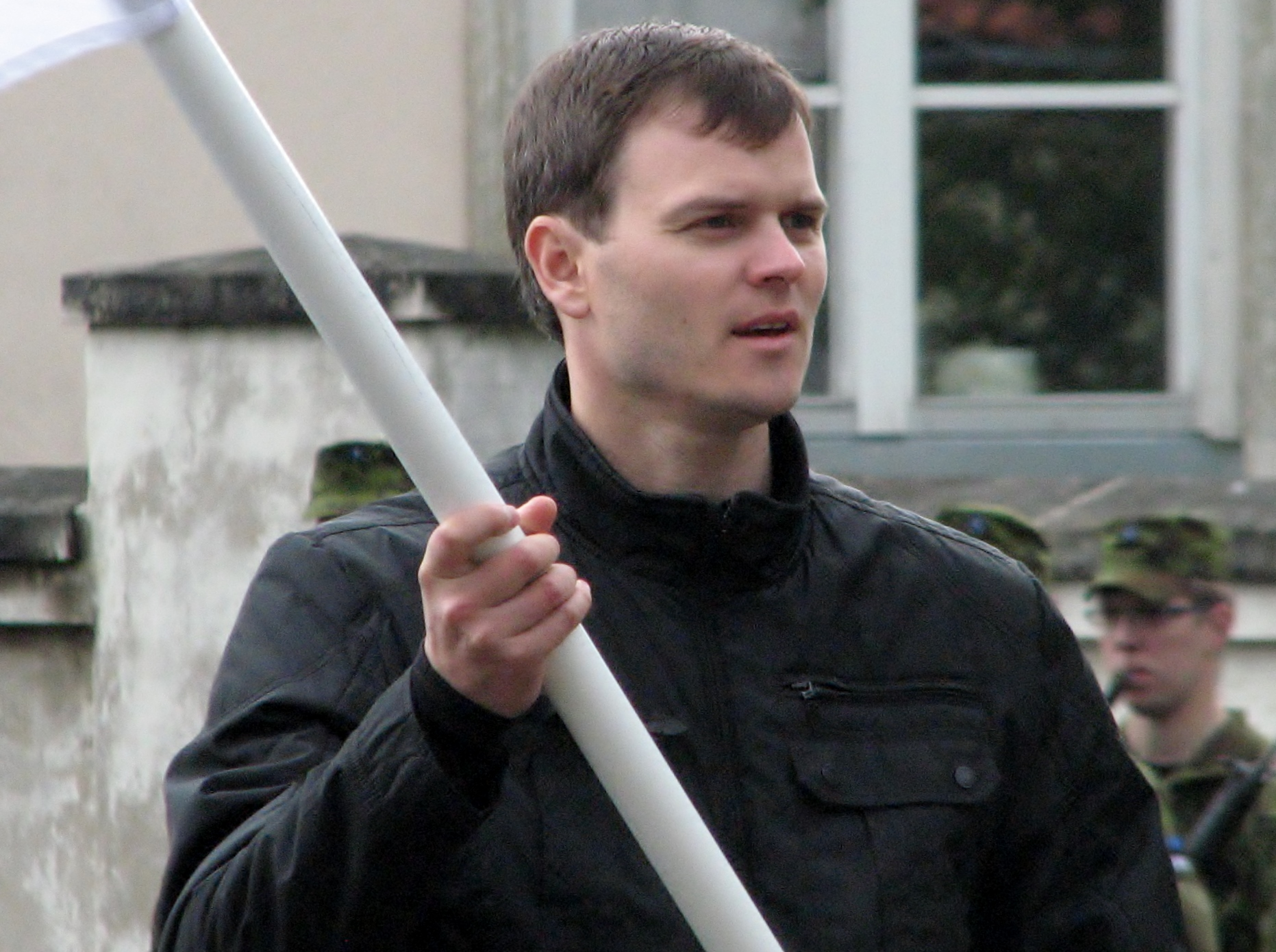
Madis Kallas in Kuressaare during the Võidupüha celebrations, June 23, 2014.

Annual military parades have taken place in honor of Võidupüha in different cities of Estonia, with the President of Estonia presiding over the event as Honorary Commander-in-Chief of the Defense Forces.

== See also ==
- Independence Day (Estonia)
- Public holidays in Estonia
- Victory Day
- Flag Day of the Finnish Defence Forces – a Finnish holiday
