= Independence Day (Estonia) =

National holiday in Estonia

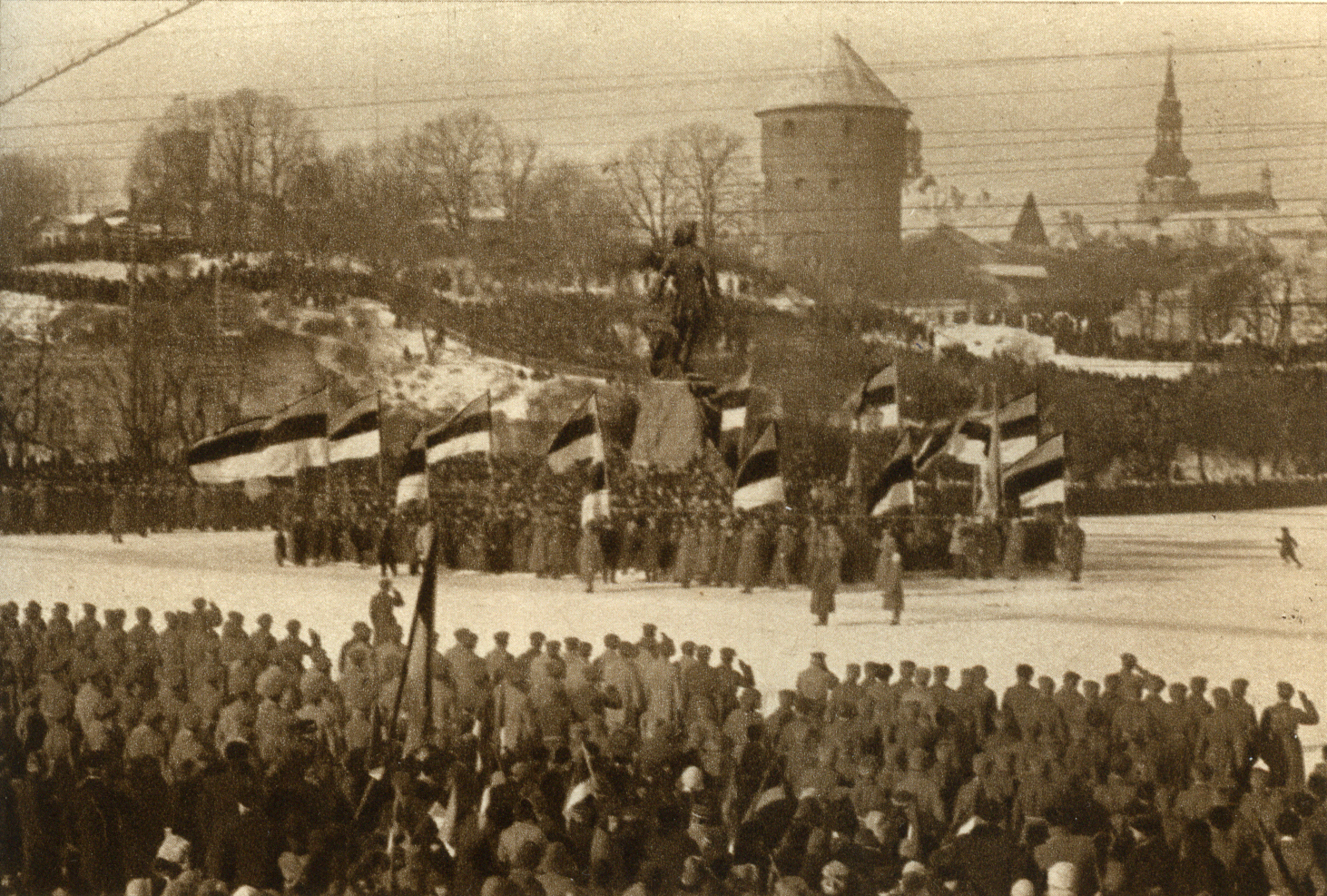
- Celebration of the first anniversary of Estonian independence in the capital Tallinn (24 February 1919)
- Official name: Anniversary of the Republic of Estonia
- Observed by: Estonian people
- Significance: Anniversary of the 1918 Estonian Declaration of Independence
- Celebrations: Concerts, Military parade
- Date: 24 February
- Next time: 24 February 2027
- Frequency: annual

Independence Day (Estonian: Eesti iseseisvuspäev), formally the Anniversary of the Republic of Estonia (Estonian: Eesti Vabariigi aastapäev), is a national holiday in Estonia commemorating the Estonian Declaration of Independence which was published in the capital city Tallinn (Reval) on 24 February 1918, establishing the Republic of Estonia. Since then, it has been the National Day of Estonia.

== Background ==
The Estonian Declaration of Independence, also known as the Manifesto to the Peoples of Estonia, was drafted in Tallinn by the Salvation Committee which had been elected by the elders of the Estonian Provincial Assembly. Originally intended to be proclaimed on 21 February 1918, the proclamation was delayed until the evening of 23 February, when the manifesto was printed and announced publicly during a political demonstration in the city of Pärnu. On the next day, 24 February 1918, the manifesto was printed and distributed in the capital, Tallinn. At the time, during World War I, as the declaration of independence occurred between retreating Bolshevik Russian and advancing German troops, Tallinn remained free of foreign military presence for only one day, 24 February 1918. During the occupation by the German Empire that followed from the next day, the German Empire did not recognise the newly declared Republic of Estonia. However, after the defeat of the Central Powers in World War I, Germany withdrew its troops from Estonia, and formally handed power in Estonia over to the Estonian Provisional Government in November 1918.

The Estonian Provisional Government decided already on 12 February 1919 to commemorate 24 February as the date of the anniversary of the declaration of independence. In the 1930s, the government discussed whether the national day should be moved to another date at a "better time of the year" (in terms of weather), such as 15 June, to mark the date when the Estonian Constituent Assembly adopted the Constitution in 1920. The date of the national day was never changed.

== Celebrations ==
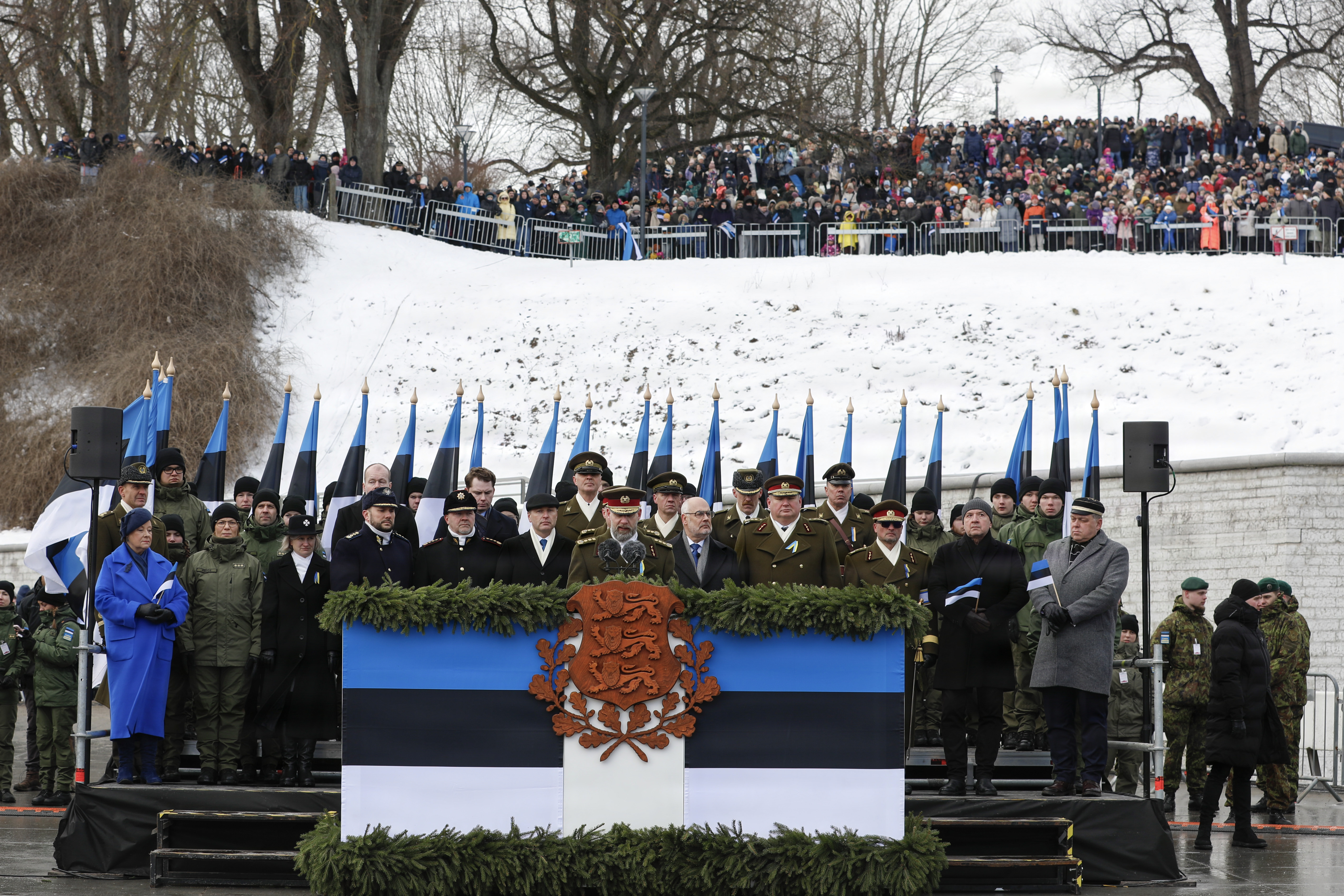
Estonian Independence Day Parade (2026)

The day begins with the national flag raising ceremony at the Pikk Hermann Tower early in the morning. The President of Estonia organises a festive Independence Day reception at which state decorations are awarded to recipients whose names are published in advance. Since the restoration of Estonian independence in 1991, a new tradition of parades by the Estonia Defence Forces has been established, with the first parade held in Tallinn in 1993 marking the diamond jubilee year since the events of 1918. Both the parade and the reception is held in different years in different cities; in 2014 they were held in Pärnu, and in 2015 in Narva, with that year's parade featuring contingents from fellow NATO member nations. The military parade, the reception and a concert that precedes the reception are broadcast live on television. This coverage includes a speech by the President. As the President's reception is always organized on 24 February, similar receptions by local governments are often held on the previous day, 23 February. Schools and other institutions sometimes hold commemorative Independence Day events even earlier.

=== Independence Day military parade ===
Held every year 1919–1940, and again since 1993, the annual military parade of the Estonian armed forces is held on Tallinn's Freedom Square. In recent years, typically on the morning of the holiday, the ground column consisting of infantry and armoured formations marching through the square from the Land Forces, Navy, Air Force, and the Defence League form part of the parade. Outside of the military, the police and other cadet and paramilitary youth organizations are represented.

The following organizations send units and formations to the parade:

- Estonian Military Academy (KVÜÕA)
- Baltic Defence College
- Guard Battalion
- Headquarters Support and Signal Battalion of the Küberkaitseliit
- 1st Infantry Brigade
- 2nd Infantry Brigade
- Support Command
- Special Operations Force
- Tallinn Volunteer District of the Estonian Defence League
- Naiskodukaitse (Women's Home Defence)
- Colour guards from NATO and European Union countries

It is often broadcast on major public television station. The parade is traditionally led by the Commander of the Estonian Defence Forces who reports to the President on the status of the parade upon his/her arrival at noon and gives the keynote address after the inspection. Attendees include the Minister of Defence and the Prime Minister of Estonia, as well as members of parliament (Riigikogu).

== Gallery ==
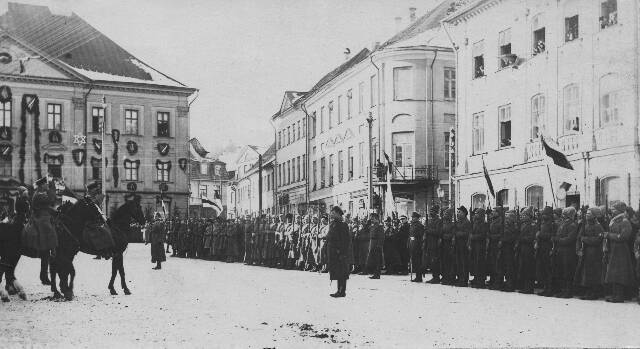
Independence Day military parade in Tartu (1919)

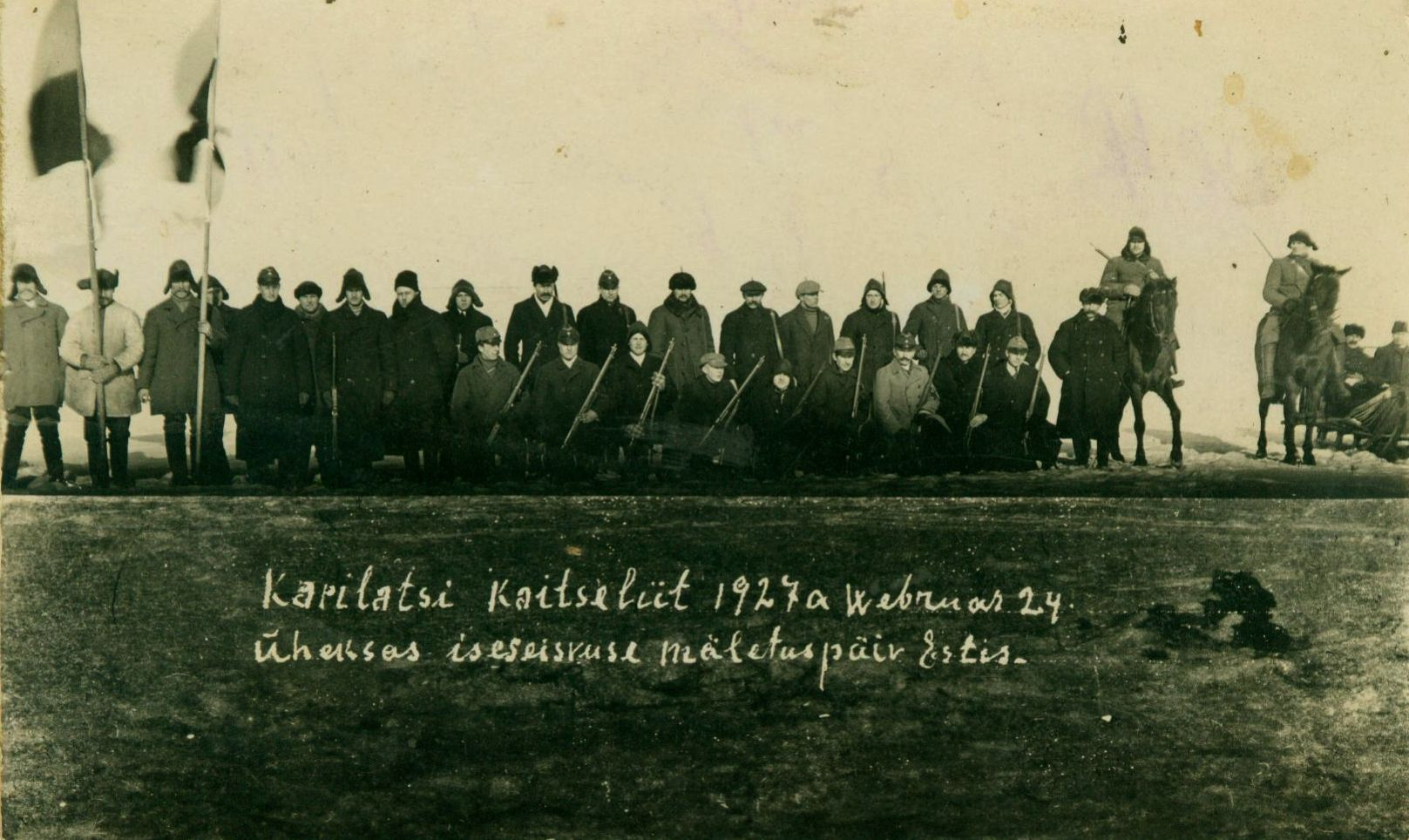
Members of the Estonian Defence League mark Independence Day in Karilatsi, Kanepi Parish, 1927

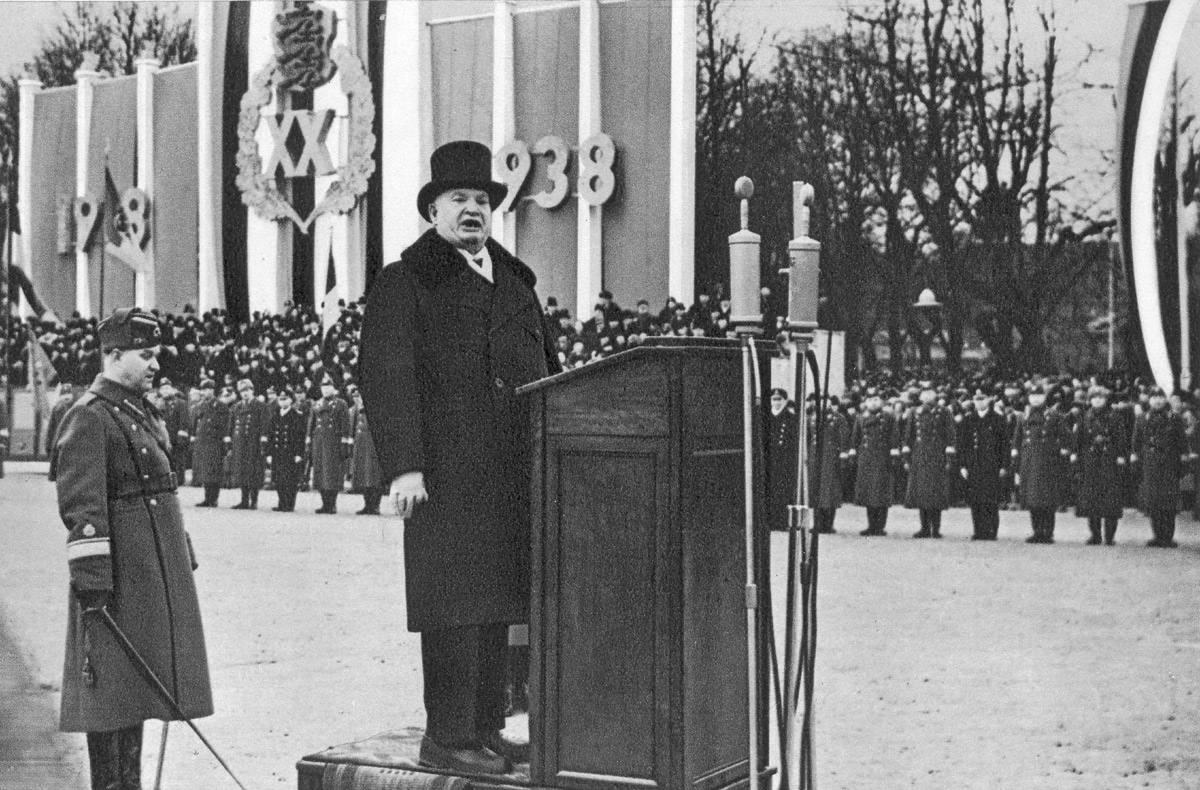
President Konstantin Päts giving a speech on the 20th anniversary of the Republic of Estonia at the Freedom Square, Tallinn (1938).

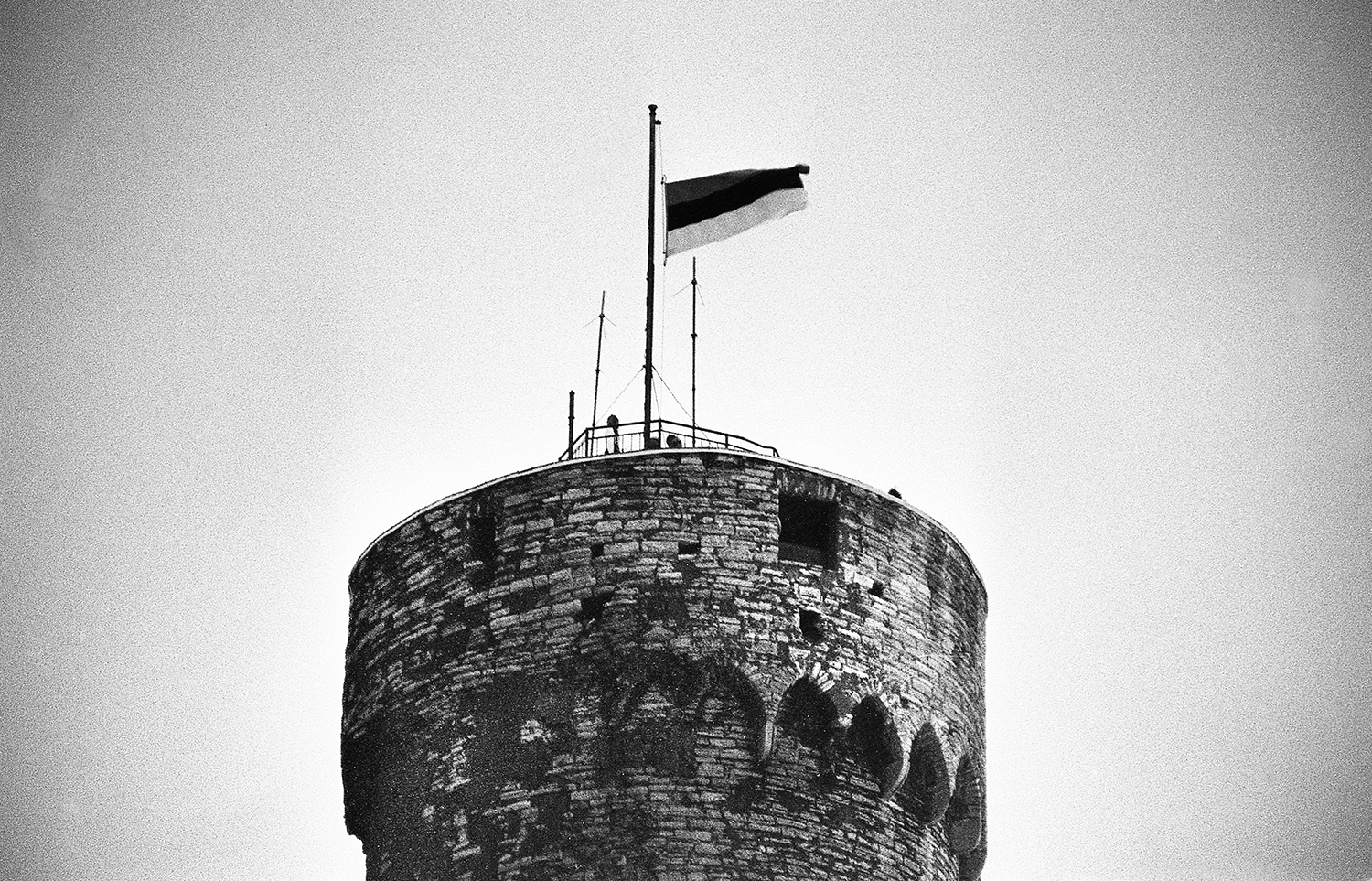
For the first time after the Soviet invasion of Estonia in 1944, the blue-black-white national flag of Estonia was raised again on the top of Pikk Hermann on 24 February 1989.

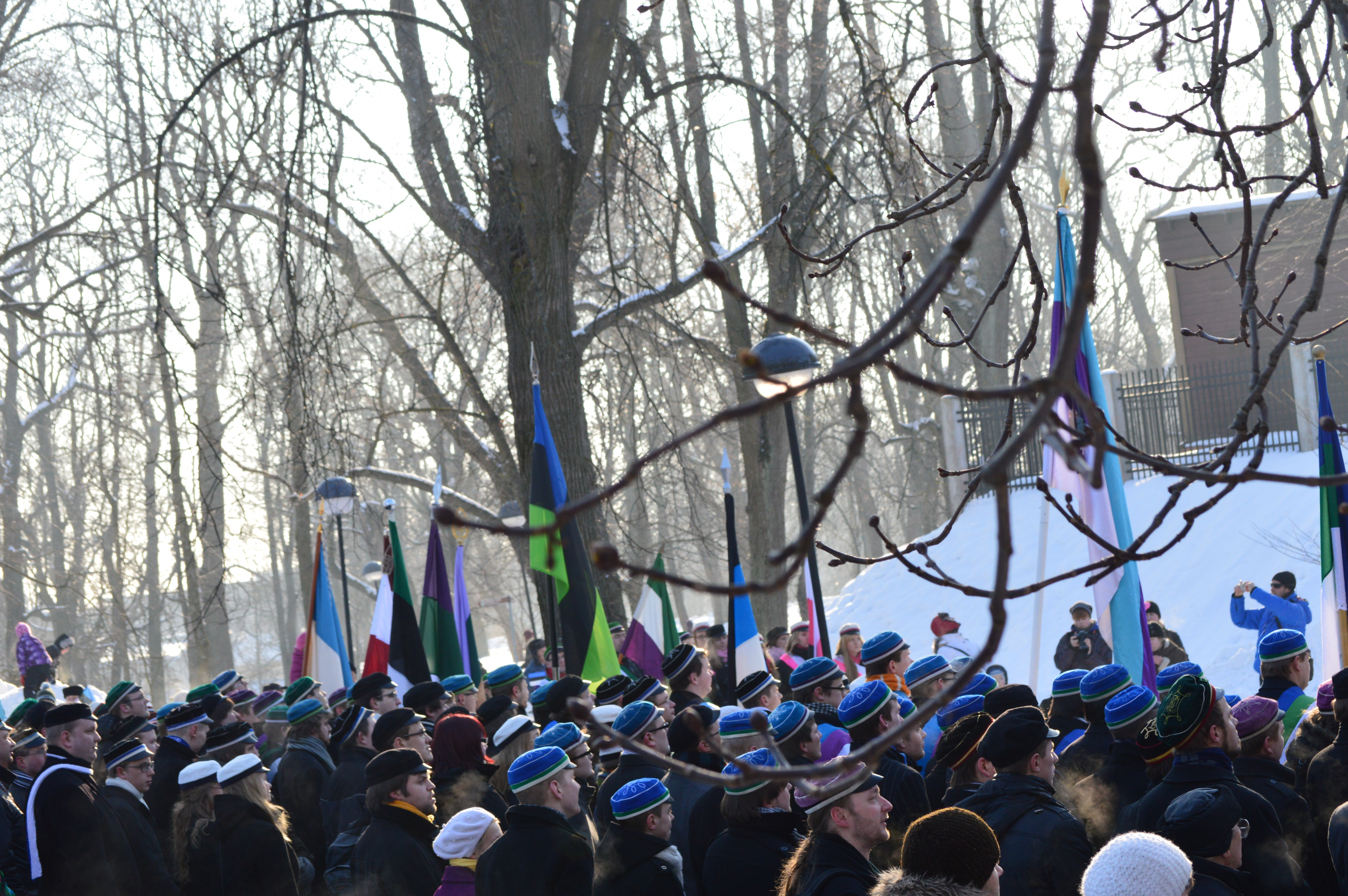
University student organisations setting up flags to celebrate Independence Day in Tartu (2013)

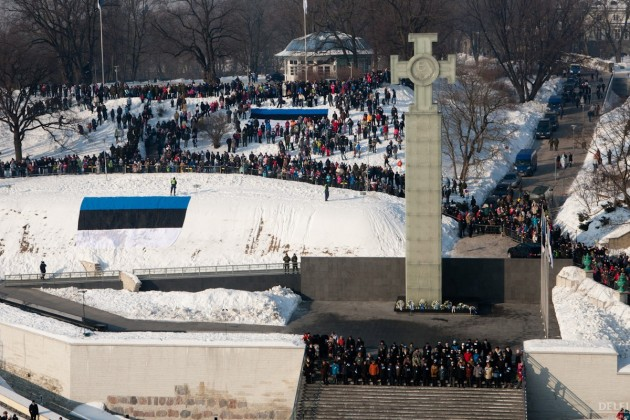
Crowds watching the military parade in Tallinn (24 February 2011)

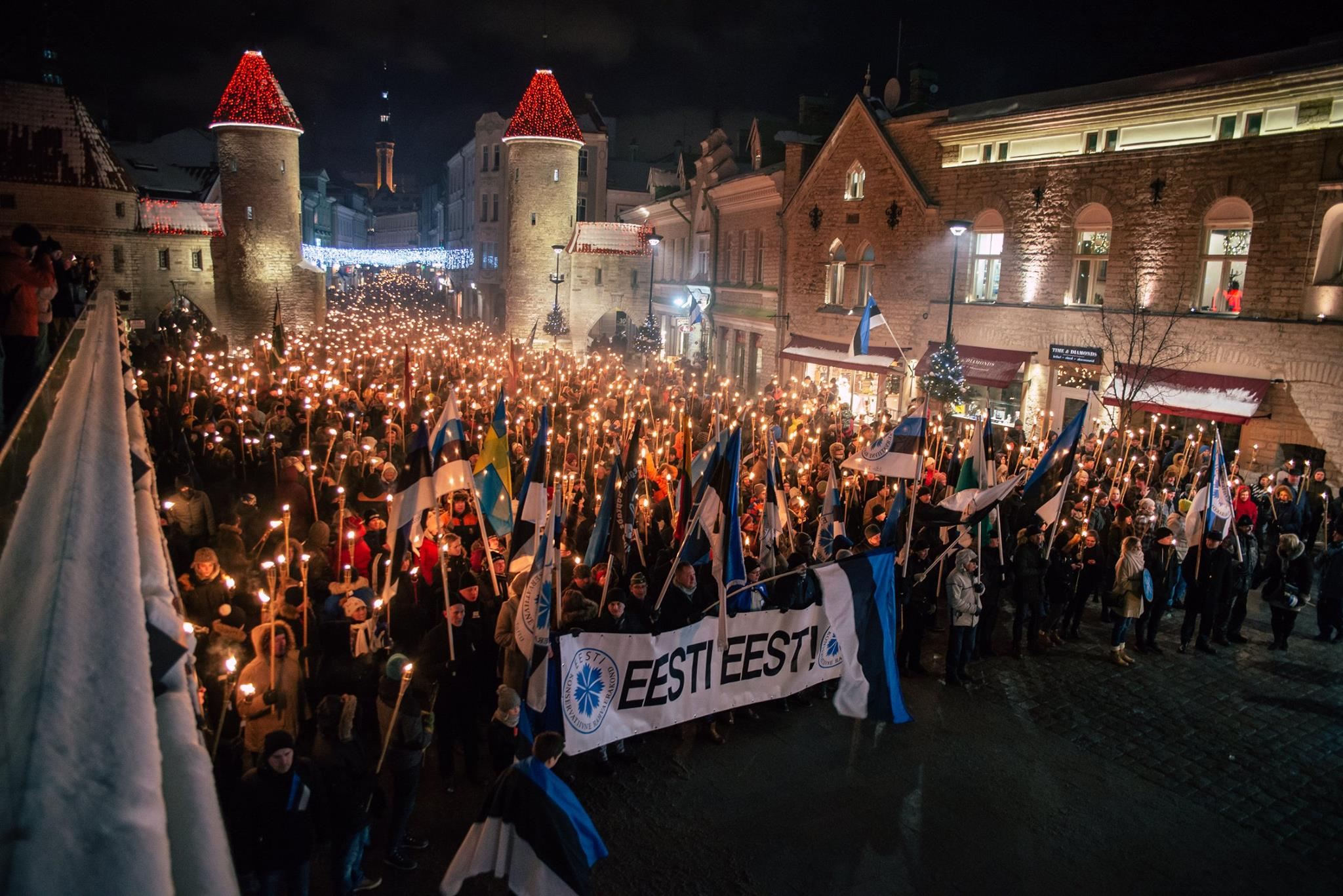
A political demonstration in Tallinn on 24 February 2018. The annual event has been organized by EKRE and the Blue Awakening to mark the Independence Day.

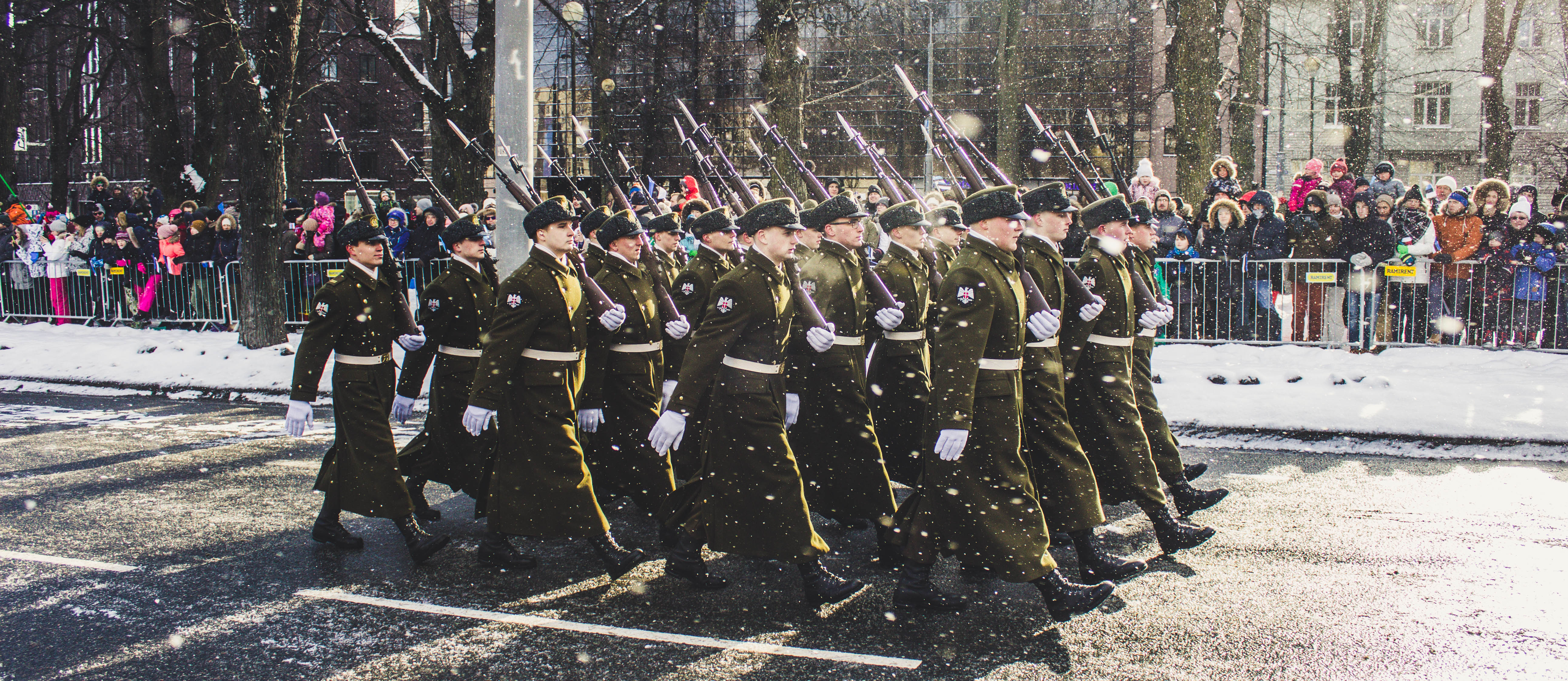
Soldiers of the Estonian Army's Guard Battalion in the parade (24 February 2018)

== See also ==
- 90th Anniversary of the Estonian Republic
- 100th Anniversary of the Estonian Republic
- Bank of Estonia, in whose Tallinn building the declaration of independence was read on 24 February 1918
