= St John's Day (Estonia) =

Estonian summer holiday

Jaanipäev
- Significance: Victory over the expulsion of German forces in the Estonian War of Independence; Celebration of the Nativity of Saint John the Baptist
- Begins: June 23
- Ends: June 24
- Date: June 24
- Next time: 24 June 2027
- Frequency: annual
- Related to: Saint John's Eve

Jaanipäev (St John's Day in English) and jaaniõhtu, also jaanilaupäev (Saint John's Eve in English) are the most important days in the Estonian calendar. The short summer seasons with long days and brief nights hold special significance for the people of Estonia. Jaanipäev is celebrated on the night between June 23 and 24, the Western Christian feast of the nativity of Saint John the Baptist, which is a few days after the summer solstice.

== History of St. John’s Day ==
Jaanipäev, although not known by that name in the pre-Christian era, it was celebrated long before the arrival of Christianity in Estonia. After the country was Christianised, the feast took the name Saint John's Day, or Jaanipäev (in Estonian). The arrival of Christianity, however, did not end fertility rituals surrounding this holiday. In 1578, with some disgust, Balthasar Russow wrote in his Livonian Chronicle about Estonians who placed more importance on feasting than going to church. He complained about those who went to church, but did not enter, and instead spent their time lighting bonfires, drinking, dancing, and singing.

For Estonians, jaanipäev celebrations were merged with the celebration of võidupüha (Victory Day) during the War of Independence when Estonian forces defeated the German troops in the Battle of Cēsis (Võnnu) on 23 June 1919. After this battle against Estonia's traditional oppressors, jaaniõhtu and the lighting of the traditional bonfires became linked with the ideals of independence and freedom.

== Significance ==
Jaanipäev marks a change in the farming year, specifically the break between the completion of spring sowing and the hard work of summer hay-making.

On jaaniõhtu, Estonians all around the country will gather with their families, or at larger events to celebrate this important day with singing and dancing, as Estonians have done for centuries.

Some of the rituals of jaanipäev have very strong folkloric roots. The best-known Jaanik, or midsummer, ritual is the lighting of the bonfire and then jumping over it. This is seen as a way of guaranteeing prosperity and avoiding bad luck. Likewise, to not light the fire is to invite the destruction of your house by fire. The fire also frightened away mischievous spirits who avoided it at all costs, thus ensuring a good harvest. So, the bigger the fire, the further the mischievous spirits stayed away.

Midsummer's eve is important for lovers. Among Estonian fairy tales and literature there is the tale of two lovers, Koit (dawn) and Hämarik (dusk). These two lovers see each other only once a year and exchange the briefest of kisses on the shortest night of the year. Earth-bound lovers go into the forest looking for the flower of the fern which is said to bloom only on that night because ferns are not seed-bearing plants and do not flower. Also on this night, single people can follow a detailed set of instructions involving different flowers to see whom they are going to marry.

Former President Lennart Meri has provided another perspective on jaanipäev in his work Hõbevalge (Silverwhite, 1976). Meri suggests that the jaanipäev traditions re-enact the fall of the Kaali meteorite in Saaremaa. The meteorite's fall is also said to be the inspiration for Nordic and Baltic mythological stories about the Sun falling onto the Earth. This idea suggests that the present-day bonfires and celebrations actually symbolise Estonia's connection with its ancient past.

During their occupation of Estonia, the Soviets made no attempt to stop jaanipäev celebrations. For Estonians, however, jaanipäev remained tied to Estonia's victory during the War of Independence and the securing of a free and independent state. Jaanipäev, therefore, always reminded Estonians of their independence in the past, despite Soviet attempts to eliminate such ideas.

The tradition before the Soviet occupation, which has now been restored, was for a fire to be lit by the Estonian President on the morning of võidupüha (June 23). From this fire, the flame of independence was carried across the country to light the many bonfires.

During the transition to the re-establishment of Estonia's de facto independence, jaanipäev became an unofficial holiday, with many work places closing down. It once again became an official national holiday in 1992.

== See also ==
- Summer Solstice celebrations
- Midsummer
- Saint John's Eve
- Jāņi (Latvia)
- Joninės (Lithuania)
