= 2007 in Estonian television =

This is a list of Estonian television related events from 2007.

== Events ==
- 3 February - Gerli Padar is selected to represent Estonia at the 2007 Eurovision Song Contest with her song "Partners in Crime". She is selected to be the thirteenth Estonian Eurovision entry during Eurolaul held at the ETV Studios in Tallinn.
- 11 March - The Estonian version of Pop Idol debuts on TV3.
- 14 June - Birgit Õigemeel wins the first season of Eesti otsib superstaari.

== Debuts ==
- 11 March - Eesti otsib superstaari (2007–present)

== Television shows ==
=== 1990s ===
- Õnne 13 (1993–present)

== Networks and services ==
=== Channels ===
==== New channels ====
- 1 March - Nat Geo Wild
- 7 July - Seitse
- 30 October - FX
- November - TV4

== Deaths ==
- 5 May - Dan Põldroos (born 1970), actor
- 20 September – Kaljo Kiisk (born 1925), actor, director
