= Terje Pennie =

Estonian actress (born 1960)

- Born: 9 January 1960 (age 66); Kehra, then part of Estonian SSR, Soviet Union
- Other name: Terje Pennie-Kolberg
- Education: Tallinn State Conservatory
- Occupation: Actress
- Years active: 1978–present
- Spouse: Jaan Kolberg (m. 1991)
- Children: 3

Terje Pennie (occasionally credited as Terje Pennie-Kolberg; born 9 January 1960) is an Estonian stage, television, and film actress whose career began as a teenager in the late 1970s.

== Early life and education ==
Terje Pennie was born and raised in Kehra, where she attended primary and secondary schools; she is a 1978 graduate of Kehra Secondary School. Her first cousin is actress and dancer Laine Mägi. In 1980, she enrolled in the Tallinn State Conservatory (now, the Estonian Academy of Music and Theatre), studying acting under course instructor Mikk Mikiver, graduating in 1984. Among her graduating classmates were Rita Rätsepp, Margus Tabor, Kiiri Tamm, Gita Ränk, Toomas Urb, and Peeter Sauter.

== Career ==
=== Stage ===
In 1978, shortly after secondary school, Terje Pennie began a two-year engagement at the Ugala theatre in Viljandi, leaving in 1980 to further her studies at the Tallinn State Conservatory. Following her graduation in 1984, she was engaged at the Rakvere Theatre in Rakvere until 1990, then began an engagement at the Estonian Drama Theatre in Tallinn. Pennie left the theatre 2000 and performed at the NUKU theatre and the Old Town Theatre in Tallinn before becoming a freelance actress, performing at the Rakvere Theatre, the Vanemuine theatre in Tartu, and other stages throughout Estonia.

Notable stage roles in productions of works by such international authors and playwrights include those of: Ferenc Molnár, Leonard Bernstein, Anton Chekhov, Mark Medoff, Bogusław Schaeffer, Yukio Mishima, Juhani Aho, Bertolt Brecht, and Sven Holm. Pennie has also performed in a number of roles in works by such notable Estonian authors and playwrights as: Mati Unt, Jaan Kruusvall, A. H. Tammsaare, August Kitzberg, Hugo Raudsepp, and Ain Kalmus. In 2016, she returned to the Ugala theatre, where she is currently engaged.

=== Film ===
Pennie's first screen appearances was a small role in the Olav Neuland-directed 1984 period-adventure film Hundiseaduse aegu. Her first prominent role was as Milvi in the Leida Laius-directed drama Varastatud kohtumine in 1989. Among her more notable roles were as Tekla the 1992 tragicomedy Võlausaldajad, directed by her husband Jaan Kolberg, and adapted from the 1889 August Strindberg play Creditors; as Paula in the 2006 comedy-drama Tabamata ime, which was a collection of six vignettes with six directors and based on Eduard Vilde's play of the same name first published in 1912; as Poe-Liivi in the 2011 Katrin Laur-directed drama Surnuaiavahi tütar; and as a midwife in the 2018 Liina Triškina-Vanhatalo-directed drama Võta või jäta, which was selected as the Estonian entry for the Best Foreign Language Film at the 91st Academy Awards. Pennie has appeared in approximately twelve feature-length films to date, as well as a number of short subject films.

=== Television ===
Terje Pennie has made frequent appearances on Estonian television and is possibly best recalled as the character Aino Järvik on the long-running Eesti Televisioon (ETV) drama series Õnne 13; joining the ensemble cast in 2008. Other notable television appearances include the role of Sille in the Andrus Vaarik-directed musical teleplay Georg in 2006. Between 2010 and 2014, she also made several guest appearances on TV3 comedy-crime series Kättemaksukontor and in 2017 appeared in the role of Miralda Aaspere on the Kanal 2 crime series Siberi võmm. In 2017 she joined the cast of the ETV ten-part drama series Pank, which follows the rise and subsequent misfortunes of a new bank that which emerges in Estonia in the 1990s.

== Personal life ==
Terje Pennie is of Ingrian Finnish descent. She married filmmaker Jaan Kolberg in 1991. The couple have three children.
