= Kiiri Tamm =

Estonian actress and stage manager

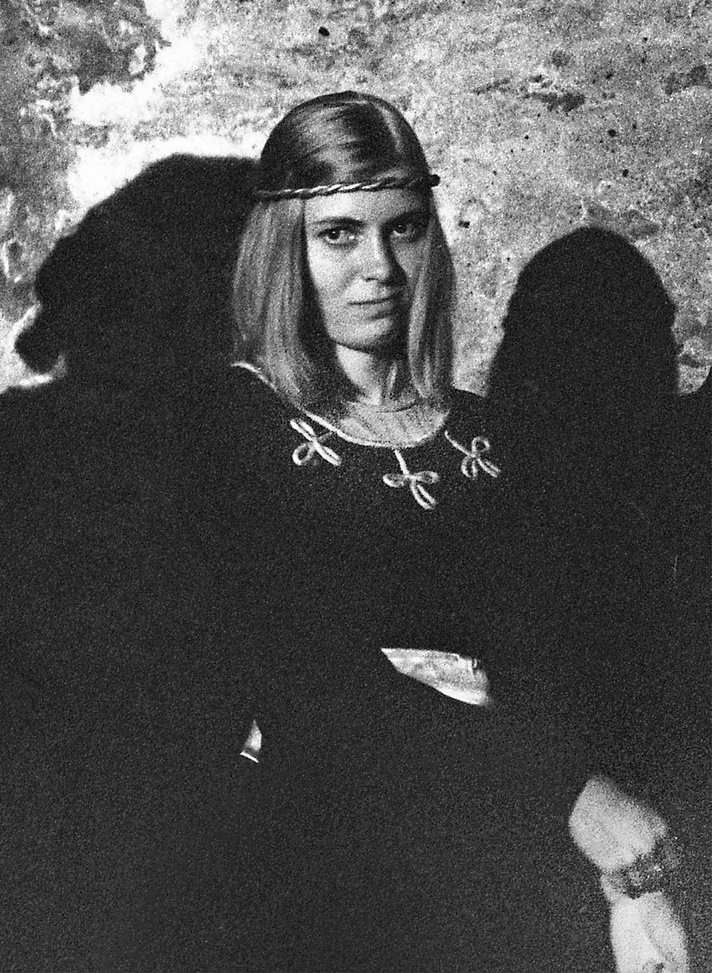
- Kiiri Tamm in 1983
- Born: 7 January 1962 (age 64); Tallinn, then part of Estonian SSR, Soviet Union
- Occupation: Actress
- Years active: 1983–present

Kiiri Tamm (born 7 January 1962) is an Estonian stage, television and film actress and stage manager.

== Early life and educatuin ==
Kiiri Tamm was born in Tallinn, but raised mainly in Kuressaare, on the island of Saaremaa. She graduated from secondary school in 1980 from Kingissepa High School No. 1 School (now, Saaremaa Gymnasium, abbreviated SÜG). Afterwards, she attended the Tallinn State Conservatory, Performing Arts Department (now, the Estonian Academy of Music and Theatre) studying under instructor Mikk Mikiver, graduating in 1984. Among her graduating classmates were Rita Rätsepp, Margus Tabor, Terje Pennie, Gita Ränk, Toomas Urb, and Peeter Sauter.

== Stage career ==
Following graduation Tamm joined the Rakvere Theatre as an actress in 1984. She would be engaged at the theatre until 1994. Some of her most important roles at the Rakvere Theatre were in production of works by: Shakespeare, Oscar Wilde, Tennessee Williams, A. H. Tammsaare, Lydia Koidula, Henrik Ibsen, Bernard Kangro, and Hans Christian Andersen.

Following her departure from Rakvere, she joined the Ugala theatre in Viljandi in 1994, where she is still engaged as an actress. Notable roles at the Ugala include those in productions of works by such varied authors and playwrights as: Thornton Wilder, Agatha Christie, Arthur Miller, Victor Hugo, Fyodor Dostoyevsky, Oskar Luts, August Gailit, Ben Elton, Eve Ensler, Hella Wuolijoki, Leo Tolstoy, Astrid Lindgren, Anton Chekhov, Tõnu Õnnepalu, Terry Pratchett, Rainer Werner Fassbinder, and Tom Stoppard, among others. Since 2005, Tamm has also been a stage manager at the Ugala.

Tamm has also appeared in roles at a number of other theatres throughout Estonia, including the Von Krahl Theatre in Tallinn, the Kuressaare Linnateater, and the Vanemuine in Tartu.

== Television career ==
Kiiri Tamm's first television appearance was in the role of Kristiina in the 1983 Raul Tammet directed television sports drama film Küljetuul. Afterwards, she would return to her studies and then to the theatre. She would not return to television until a 2007 appearance on the ETV crime series Ohtlik lend.

She would go on to make several more appearances on Estonian television; such as two roles in 2008 and 2010 in the Kanal 2 crime series Kelgukoerad; as Merle, Tiit's mother in Klass - Elu pärast, which was a 2008 television miniseries follow-up of the Ilmar Raag directed 2007 feature-film Klass about school bullying and violence; as the character of Anne Õigepaulus in several episodes of the TV3 crime-comedy series Kättemaksukontor in 2011; and a small role in the 2014 Kanal 2 crime-drama series Viimane võmm.

== Film career ==
Kiiri Tamm made her feature-film debut in the role of Ulla in the Olav Neuland directed 1984 historical adventure film Hundiseaduse aegu for Tallinnfilm. This was followed by another role as Hilka in the 1991 Jaan Kolberg directed drama See kadunud tee, also for Tallinnfilm.

Tamm's most substantial film role to date has been that of Aino in the 2013 Ilmar Raag directed romantic drama Kertu, starring Mait Malmsten and Ursula Ratasepp, for Amrion studios.

She has also appeared in a number of film shorts and student films.

== Personal life ==
Kiiri Tamm has been in a long-term relationship with actor Arvi Mägi for many years.
