= Peeter Sauter =

Estonian writer

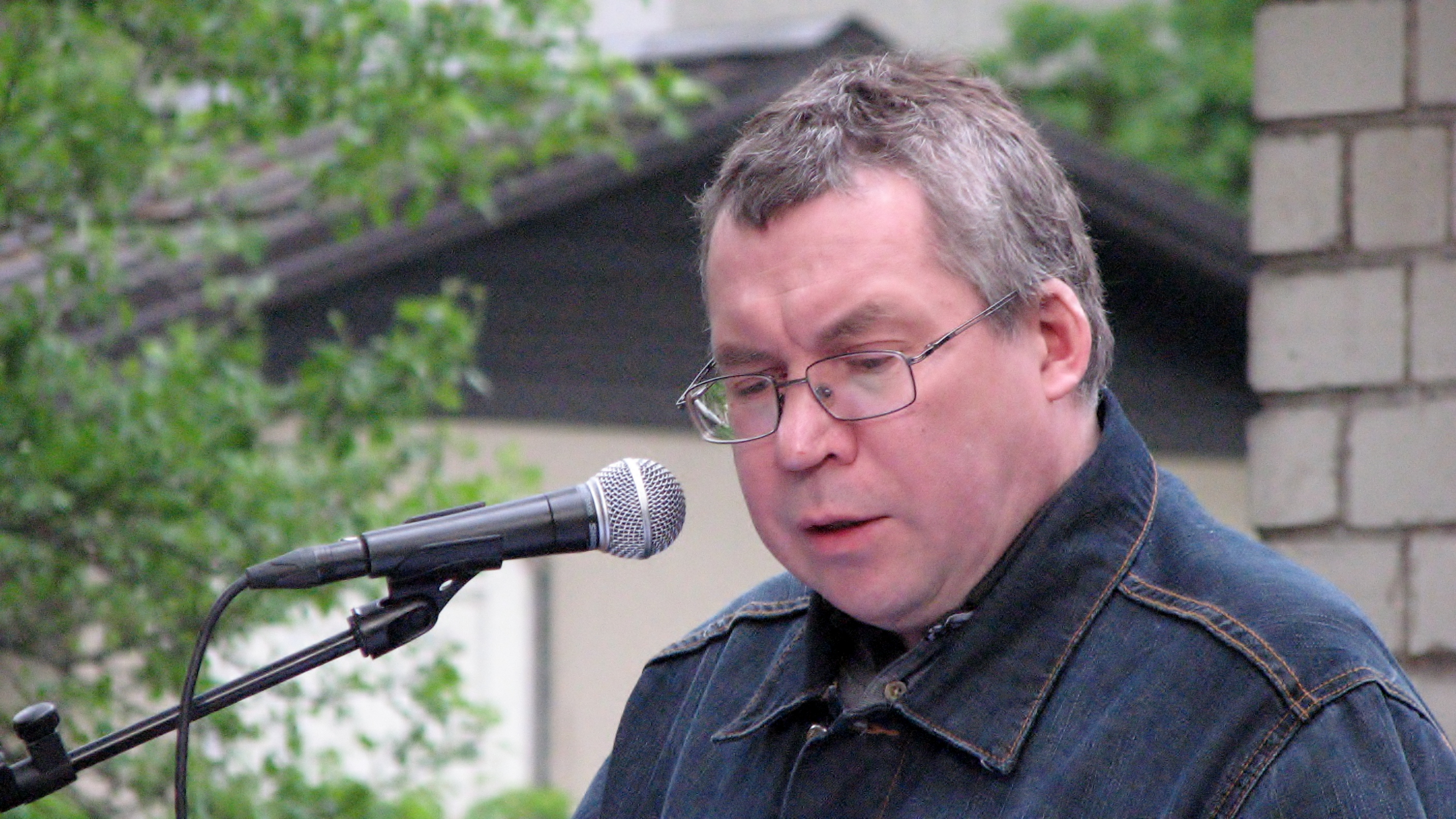
Peeter Sauter in 2012

Peeter Sauter (born March 11, 1962, in Tallinn, Soviet Union) is an Estonian author, translator and former actor.

== Literature ==
In 1980, Sauter enrolled in the Tallinn State Conservatory (now, the Estonian Academy of Music and Theatre), studying acting under course instructor Mikk Mikiver, graduating in 1984. Among his graduating classmates were Rita Rätsepp, Margus Tabor, Kiiri Tamm, Gita Ränk, Toomas Urb, and Terje Pennie. He also studied drama at the Liverpool John Moores University in Liverpool, United Kingdom. From 1984 until 1985, he was a stage actor at the Ugala theatre in Viljandi.

Sauter made his literary debut in 1988 in the Estonian magazine Vikerkaar (Rainbow). He sent in a brief prose piece for one-time publication. The editor of the magazine recalls it as "trash", but truly likeable.

Sauter is famous for writing many brief stories seemingly without a beginning or an end. In 1990, he published a collection of them in the book Indigo. This was followed by a bulkier collection titled Loafing. Sauter says that the protagonist in these short pieces is his contemporary and is aging with him. His prose feeds directly on everyday life and he frequently uses spoken and obscene language.

He has translated works of Bukowski and Kerouac into Estonian.

== Scandals ==
Kõhuvalu (Stomachache), a short story by Sauter, has created a great deal of controversy in post-Soviet Estonia. The topic addressed by Stomachache is giving birth. Birth is considered sacred by many Estonians. In light of this opinion, the story is considered crude. The story won the Friedebert Tuglas Short Story Award nevertheless.

Sauter's poem, Lauakõne Eesti Vabariigi aastapäeva puhul kainestusmaja paraskile liiga pikalt istuma jäänud olles (A Short After-Dinner Speech on the Occasion of the Anniversary of the Republic of Estonia, Having Remained Sitting on the Privy Seat at the Sobering Centre for Too Long), from 1998 is also considered controversial. It also takes a serious topic (this time, the 80th anniversary of Estonia's independence) and addresses it with humor.
