= 1976 in television =

1976 in television may refer to:

- 1976 in American television for television-related events in the United States.
- 1976 in Australian television for television-related events in Australia.
- 1976 in Belgian television for television-related events in Belgium.
- 1976 in Brazilian television for television-related events in Brazil.
- 1976 in British television for television-related events in the United Kingdom.
  - 1976 in Scottish television for television-related events in Scotland.
- 1976 in Canadian television for television-related events in Canada.
- 1976 in Croatian television for television-related events in Croatia.
- 1976 in Danish television for television-related events in Denmark.
- 1976 in Dutch television for television-related events in the Netherlands.
- 1976 in Estonian television for television-related events in the Estonian SSR.
- 1976 in French television for television-related events in France.
- 1976 in German television for television-related events in Germany.
- 1976 in Irish television for television-related events in the Republic of Ireland.
- 1976 in Italian television for television-related events in Italy.
- 1976 in Japanese television for television-related events in Japan.
- 1976 in New Zealand television for television-related events in New Zealand.
- 1976 in Philippine television for television-related events in the Philippines.
- 1976 in South African television for television-related events in South Africa.
- 1976 in Spanish television for television-related events in Spain.

== Television debuts ==
- Victoria Abril – Los libros
- Danny Aiello – Kojak
- Kim Basinger – Gemini Man
- Susan Blakely – Rich Man, Poor Man
- Grand L. Bush – Good Times
- Kim Cattrall – Dead on Target
- Chow Yun-fat – Saat sau qi shi er siu si
- Beverly D'Angelo – Captains and the Kings
- John de Lancie – Captains and the Kings
- Brad Dourif – The Mound Builders
- Joe Flaherty – The David Steinberg Show
- Dexter Fletcher – CBS Children's Film Festival
- Mariel Hemingway – I Want to Keep My Baby
- Christopher Lloyd – The Adams Chronicles
- Michael McKean – Laverne & Shirley
- Sam McMurray – Kojak
- Kevin McNally – Plays for Britain
- Bill Nighy – Softly, Softly: Task Force
- Lena Olin – Face to Face
- Rhea Perlman – Stalk the Wild Child
- Steve Railsback – Helter Skelter
- Deep Roy – The New Avengers
- Mercedes Ruehl – The Doctors
- William Sanderson – The Other Side of Victory
- Charlene Tilton – Happy Days
- Debra Winger – Wonder Woman
