= 1997 in Estonian television =

This is a list of Estonian television related events from 1997.

== Events ==
- 27 January - Maarja-Liis Ilus is selected to represent Estonia at the 1997 Eurovision Song Contest with her song "Keelatud maa". She is selected to be the third Estonian Eurovision entry during Eurolaul held at the Linnahall in Tallinn.

== Television shows ==
=== 1990s ===
- Õnne 13 (1993–present)

== Networks and services ==
=== New channels ===
- 10 February – TV1
