= Rita Rätsepp =

Estonian actress

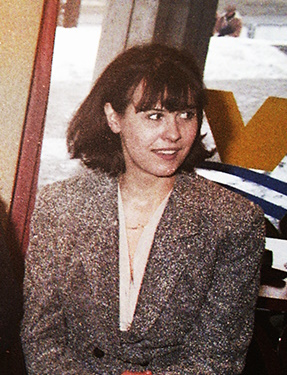
- Rätsepp in 1996
- Born: 17 July 1962 (age 63); Tammiku, then part of Estonian SSR, Soviet Union
- Occupations: Actress, psychologist
- Years active: 1984–present
- Spouse(s): Alo Mattiisen (divorced); Enn Õunpuu (divorced)
- Children: 3

Rita Rätsepp (born 17 July 1962) is an Estonian actress and psychologist whose career began in the mid-1980s. She has performed on onstage, in television and in motion pictures.

== Early life and education ==
Rita Rätsepp was born in rural Lääne-Viru County to Richard Rätsepp, a forester, and Aino Amanda Rätsepp (née Kull) and spent most of her childhood in the small village of Tammiku. She attended secondary schools in Rakke and Võhma. Afterward, she studied at the Tallinn State Conservatory (now, the Estonian Academy of Music and Theatre) under the instruction of Mikk Mikiver, graduating in 1984. Among her graduating classmates were Terje Pennie, Margus Tabor, Kiiri Tamm, Gita Ränk, Toomas Urb, and Peeter Sauter. In 2008, she received her master's degree in social sciences in the field of psychology from University Nord in Tallinn.

== Career ==
=== Actress ===
After graduation from the Tallinn State Conservatory, Rätsepp performed as a stage actress at the Estonian Drama Theatre and the Estonian National Puppet Theater (now, the NUKU Theatre), among others. Her first substantial television role was as Heli Mets in the 1986 Peeter Urbla-directed historical television drama film Võõra nime all. She is possibly best known to Estonian television viewers for her role of Sirje Jakobson in the Kanal 2 television drama series Pilvede all, since 2010. Other television series appearances include roles on the Kanal 2 crime serials Kelgukoerad (2009) and Viimane võmm (2015). In 2010, she appeared in the role of Sirje, Kerli's mother in Klass - Elu pärast, which was a 2010 ETV2 television miniseries follow-up of the Ilmar Raag directed 2007 feature-film Klass about school bullying and violence.

Notable film roles include that of Opal Madving in the 1986 Arvo Kruusement-directed mystery crime-drama Bande from Tallinnfilm, based on the 1930 novel The Glass Key by American writer Dashiell Hammett; the 2011 Gerli Nõmm-directed drama short Puhastus; the 2012 Sander Maran-directed comedy-horror short Uudishimu tapab; and the 2014 Anna Hints-directed drama short Õnne Manifest. In 2018, Rätsepp reprised her role as Sirje Jakobson from the television series Pilvede all for the Toomas Kirss-directed feature film Pilvede all. Neljas õde, a follow-up on the lives of the characters from the television series.

=== Psychologist ===
As well as acting, Rita Rätsepp is also a practicing psychologist. She has worked at the Tallinn Children's Hospital, Tallinn Central Children's Polyclinic, the North-Estonia Medical Centre Seewald Psychiatric Polyclinic, and as a psychologist, adviser and counselor at the Rocca al Mare School in Tallinn.

== Personal life ==
Rita Rätsepp was married twice. Her first husband was musician and composer Alo Mattiisen. The couple were in a relationship for six years prior to marrying and married for three years before divorcing. They had one daughter, Anna-Mariita Mattiisen. Rätsepp later married Enn Õunpuu. The couple have two children and divorced in 2012.
