= 2001 in Estonian television =

This is a list of Estonian television related events from 2001.

== Events ==
- 3 February – Tanel Padar and Dave Benton are selected to represent Estonia at the 2001 Eurovision Song Contest with their song "Everybody". They are selected to be the seventh Estonian Eurovision entry during Eurolaul held at the ETV Studios in Tallinn.
- 12 May – Estonia wins the 46th Eurovision Song Contest in Copenhagen, Denmark. The winning song is "Everybody", performed by Tanel Padar and Dave Benton.

== Debuts ==
=== International ===
- 15 February - (United States) L.A. Heat

== Television shows ==
=== 1990s ===
- Õnne 13 (1993–present)
- Wremja (2001–2003)

== Channels ==
=== Closed channels ===
- 3 October – TV1
