= 1984 in Estonia =

- Decades: 1960s; 1970s; 1980s; 1990s; 2000s
- See also: Other events of 1984; Timeline of Estonian history

This article lists events that occurred during 1984 in Estonia.

== Events ==
- 8–15 July – IV Global Estonian Cultural Days were taken place in Toronto, Canada.

== See also ==
- 1984 in Estonian television
