= 2016 in Estonian television =

This is a list of Estonian television related events from 2016.

== Events ==
- 21 February - Eesti otsib superstaari season 6 winner Jüri Pootsmann is selected to represent Estonia at the 2016 Eurovision Song Contest with his song "Play". He is selected to be the twenty-second Estonian Eurovision entry during Eesti Laul held at the Saku Suurhall in Tallinn.

== Television shows ==
=== 1990s ===
- Õnne 13 (1993–present)

=== 2000s ===
- Eesti otsib superstaari (2007–present)

== Networks and services ==
=== Closed channels ===
- 31 December - Seitse

== See also ==
- 2016 in Estonia
