= 2009 in Estonian television =

This is a list of Estonian television related events from 2009.

== Events ==
- 7 March - Urban Symphony are selected to represent Estonia at the 2009 Eurovision Song Contest with their song "Rändajad". They are selected to be the fifteenth Estonian Eurovision entry during Eesti Laul held at the ETV Studios in Tallinn.
- 20 December - Ott Lepland wins the third season of Eesti otsib superstaari, becoming the show's first man to be crowned as winner.

== Television shows ==
=== 1990s ===
- Õnne 13 (1993–present)

=== 2000s ===
- Eesti otsib superstaari (2007–present)

== Networks and services ==
=== Channels ===
==== Closed channels ====
- 19 November - MTV
- 30 November - TV4
