= 2006 in Estonian television =

This is a list of Estonian television related events from 2006.

== Events ==
- 4 February - Sandra Oxenryd is selected to represent Estonia at the 2006 Eurovision Song Contest with her song "Through My Window". She is selected to be the twelfth Estonian Eurovision entry during Eurolaul held at the ETV Studios in Tallinn.

== Television shows ==
=== 1990s ===
- Õnne 13 (1993–present)
- Kelgukoerad (2006-2013)

== Networks and services ==
=== Channels ===
==== New channels ====
- 10 July - Crime & Investigation
- 4 September - MTV

== Deaths ==
- 9 January – Mikk Mikiver (born 1937), actor, director
- 4 November – Dajan Ahmet (born 1962), actor
