= Teede =

Teede is a surname. Notable people with the surname include:

- Andra Teede (born 1988), Estonian writer
- Gaye Teede (born 1946), Australian netball player and coach
