= 2002 in Estonian television =

This is a list of Estonian television related events from 2002.

== Events ==
- 26 January - Sahlene is selected to represent Estonia at the 2002 Eurovision Song Contest with her song "Runaway". She is selected to be the eighth Estonian Eurovision entry during Eurolaul held at the Linnahall in Tallinn.
- 25 May - The 47th Eurovision Song Contest is held at the Saku Suurhall Arena in Tallinn. Latvia wins the contest with the song "I Wanna", performed by Marie N.
- 4 September - First Baltic channel launches.

== Television shows ==
=== 1990s ===
- Õnne 13 (1993–present)
