= Esto =

Esto may refer to:

- Esto, Florida, a town in the United States
- Esto, Kentucky, an unincorporated community in the United States
- Global Estonian Cultural Days, abbreviated ESTO
- ESTO, a newspaper published by Organización Editorial Mexicana

== See also ==
- Estonia
- Estonians
