= 1974 in Estonian television =

This is a list of Estonian television related events from 1974.

== Births ==
- 19 March - Ardo Ran Varres, composer and actor
- 14 May - Anu Välba, TV and radio host
- 21 November - Tiit Sukk, actor and TV host
- 30 December - Henry Kõrvits, rapper and TV host
