= 1986 in Estonia =

- Decades: 1960s; 1970s; 1980s; 1990s; 2000s
- See also: Other events of 1986; Timeline of Estonian history

This article lists events that occurred during 1986 in Estonia.

== Events ==
- Muuga Harbour was opened.

== Births ==
- 19 April – Henrik Kalmet, actor and comedian
- 1 November – Ksenija Balta, track and field athlete
- 18 November – Ragne Veensalu, actress

== See also ==
- 1986 in Estonian television
