= Veesaar =

Veesaar is a surname. Notable people with the surname include:

- Anne Veesaar (born 1957), Estonian actress
- Henri Veesaar (born 2004), Estonian basketball player
