= 2004 in Estonian television =

This is a list of Estonian television related events from 2004.

== Events ==
- 1 February - Viasat Sport 1, Viasat Sport 2 and Viasat Sport 3 channels launch.
- 7 February - Neiokõsõ are selected to represent Estonia at the 2004 Eurovision Song Contest with their song "Tii". They are selected to be the tenth Estonian Eurovision entry during Eurolaul held at the ETV Studios in Tallinn.

== Television shows ==
=== 1990s ===
- Õnne 13 (1993–present)

== Networks and services ==
=== Channels ===
==== New channels ====
- 1 November - Viasat History

== Deaths ==
- 17 September - Evi Rauer, actress & TV director (born 1915)
