= 1999 in Estonian television =

This is a list of Estonian television related events from 1999.

== Events ==
- 30 January - Evelin Samuel & Camille are selected to represent Estonia at the 1999 Eurovision Song Contest with their song "Diamond of Night". They are selected to be the fifth Estonian Eurovision entry during Eurolaul held at the ETV Studios in Tallinn.

== Television shows ==
=== 1990s ===
- Õnne 13 (1993–present)
