= 1985 in Estonia =

- Decades: 1960s; 1970s; 1980s; 1990s; 2000s
- See also: Other events of 1985; Timeline of Estonian history

This article lists events that occurred during 1985 in Estonia.

== Events ==
- Estonian Song Festival in Tallinn.

== Births ==
17 April – Maiken Pius, actress

== See also ==
- 1985 in Estonian television
