= 2003 in Estonian television =

This is a list of Estonian television related events from 2003.

== Events ==
- 8 February - Claire's Birthday are selected to represent Estonia at the 2003 Eurovision Song Contest with their song "Eighties Coming Back". They are selected to be the ninth Estonian Eurovision entry during Eurolaul held at the ETV Studios in Tallinn.

== Television shows ==
=== 1990s ===
- Õnne 13 (1993–present)

== Networks and services ==
=== Channels ===
==== New channels ====
- 1 March - Viasat Kino

== Deaths ==
- 23 January – Heikki Haravee (born 1924), actor
- 23 February – Helle-Reet Helenurm (born 1944), actress
