= 1967 in Estonian television =

This is a list of Estonian television related events from 1967.

== Births ==
- 5 April - Kärt Tomingas, actress and singer (d. 2025)
- 11 April - Liina Olmaru, actress
- 6 June - Astrid Kannel, television journalist
- 9 July - Indrek Taalmaa, actor
- 10 August - Mart Sander, singer, actor, director, author, and TV host
