= 2000 in Estonian television =

This is a list of Estonian television related events from 2000.

== Events ==
- 5 February - Ines is selected to represent Estonia at the 2000 Eurovision Song Contest with her song "Once in a Lifetime". She is selected to be the sixth Estonian Eurovision entry during Eurolaul held at the ETV Studios in Tallinn.

== Debuts ==
=== International ===
- (United States) Garfield and Friends (TV3)

== Television shows ==
=== 1990s ===
- Õnne 13 (1993–present)

== Deaths ==
- 28 October - Aare Laanemets (born 1954), actor
