= 2005 in Estonian television =

This is a list of Estonian television related events from 2005.

== Events ==
- TV3 Plus and Boomerang launches.
- 5 February - Suntribe are selected to represent Estonia at the 2005 Eurovision Song Contest with their song "Let's Get Loud". They are selected to be the eleventh Estonian Eurovision entry during Eurolaul held at the ETV Studios in Tallinn.

== Television shows ==
=== 1990s ===
- Õnne 13 (1993–present)
