= 1998 in Estonian television =

This is a list of Estonian television related events from 1998.

== Events ==
- 24 January – Koit Toome is selected to represent Estonia at the 1998 Eurovision Song Contest with his song "Mere lapsed". He is selected to be the fourth Estonian Eurovision entry during Eurolaul held at the ETV Studios in Tallinn.

== Television shows ==
=== 1990s ===
- Õnne 13 (1993–present)
