= 1962 in Estonian television =

This is a list of Estonian television related events from 1962.

== Debuts ==
- December – concert film "Laulab Georg Ots" was finished. The film was directed by Artur Rinne.

== See also ==
- 1962 in Estonia
