= Rein Põder =

Estonian writer (1943–2018)

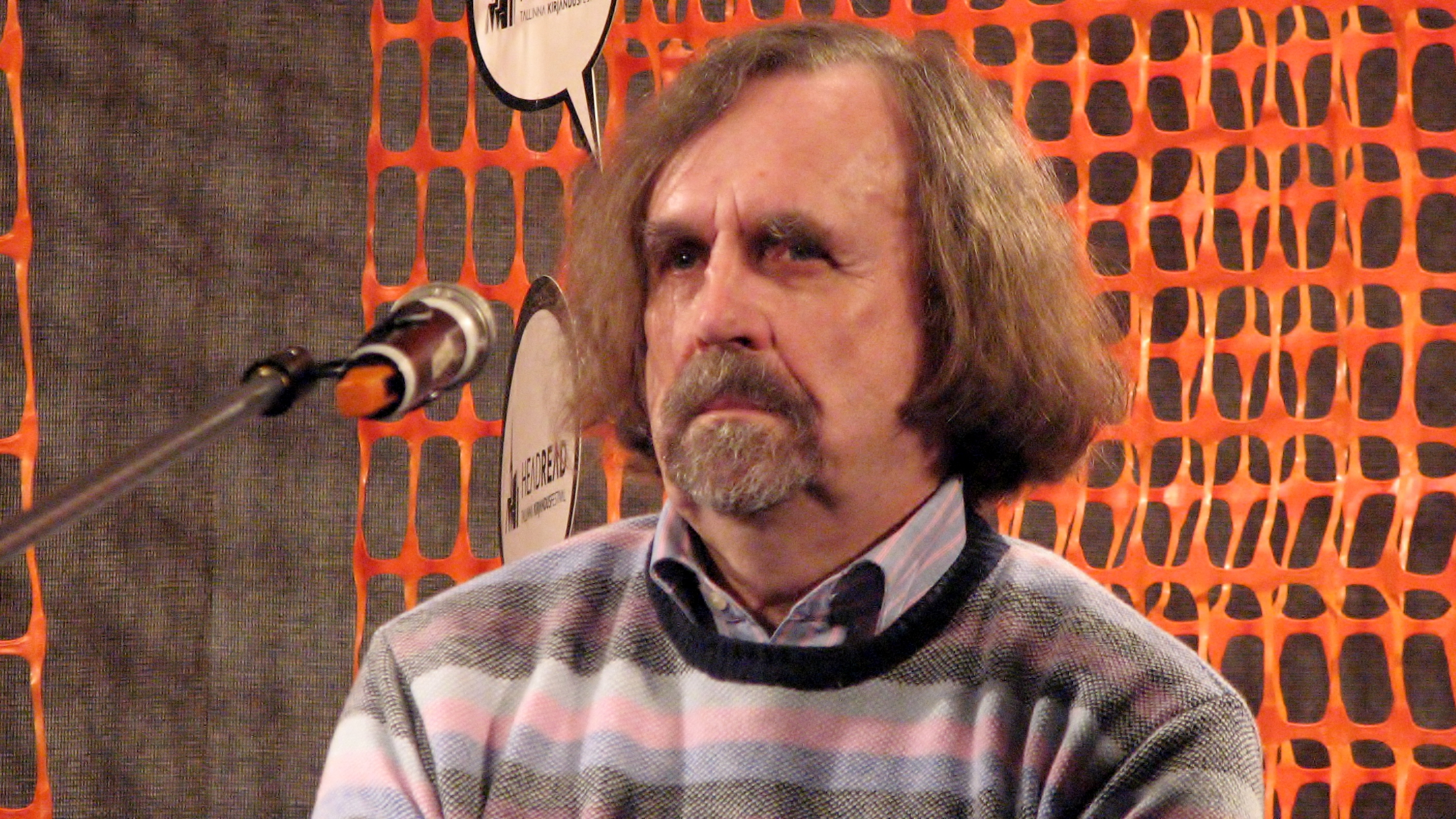
- Born: 7 July 1943; Mõniste Parish, Reichskommissariat Ostland
- Died: 23 October 2018 (aged 75); Tallinn, Estonia
- Occupation: Writer

Rein Põder (7 July 1943 – 23 October 2018) was an Estonian writer.

== Biography ==
Following his 1967 graduation in Varstu, Põder studied at the University of Tartu. After three years of military service, Põder graduated with a degree in hydrology. He spent two years working for the Estonian nature conservancy, and took part in several sea trips.

In 1971, Põder began working for the newspaper Noorte Hääl, and began lecturing for the Eesti Raamat publishing house in 1977. He joined the Estonian Writers' Union in 1989 and was a member until his death in 2018.

== Works ==
- Kingitus. Eesti Raamat, Tallinn, 1981.
- Kuldvits. Eesti Raamat, Tallinn, 1982.
- Kahekesi maailmas. Eesti Raamat, Tallinn, 1982.
- Hilised astrid. Eesti Raamat, Tallinn, 1984.
- Kõige pikem suvi. Eesti Raamat, Tallinn, 1986.
- Kivide aed. Eesti Raamat, Tallinn, 1986.
- Põlev ratas. Kaksteist kuud. Eesti Raamat, Tallinn, 1988.
- Pardiajaja. Eesti Raamat, Tallinn, 1988.
- Salaarmastus. Eesti Raamat, Tallinn, 1990.
- Jahedad varjud. Eesti Raamat, Tallinn, 1992.
- Külmnäpp. Eesti Raamat, Tallinn, 1993.
- Imelik vang. Eesti Raamat, Tallinn, 1995.
- Armastuse hääl. Eesti Raamat, Tallinn, 1996.
- Äiatar. Eesti Raamat, Tallinn, 1998.
- Hula. Eesti Raamat, Tallinn, 2000.
- Hiliskevad. Pihtimusromaan. Eesti Raamat, Tallinn, 2002.
- Teadmatus. Eesti Raamat, Tallinn, 2004.
- Eike. Eesti Raamat, Tallinn, 2006.
- Juba olnud. Eesti Raamat, Tallinn, 2008.
- Unustatud. Teekonnaromaan. Eesti Raamat, Tallinn, 2010
