= 1963 in Estonian television =

This is a list of Estonian television related events from 1963.

== Events ==
- 15 October – television magazine "Muusikaelu sündmusi ja probleeme" was started to be published.

== See also ==
- 1963 in Estonia
