= 1966 in Estonian television =

This is a list of Estonian television related events from 1966.

== Debuts ==
- 30 May - television series "Täna 25 aastat tagasi" started. The series was hosted by Valdo Pant.

== See also ==
- 1966 in Estonia
