= 1988 in Estonian television =

This is a list of Estonian television related events from 1988.

== Events ==
- 25 February – in the television series "Panda", Juhan Aare started so-called Phosphorite War.

== See also ==
- 1988 in Estonia
