= 1988 in Estonia =

- Decades: 1960s; 1970s; 1980s; 1990s; 2000s
- See also: Other events of 1988; Timeline of Estonian history

This article lists events that occurred during 1988 in Estonia.

== Events ==
- 13 April – the Estonian Popular Front was established. The front organized mass demonstrations against Soviet powers throughout July and August.
- 16 June – the First Secretary of the Communist Party of Estonia Karl Vaino was replaced by Vaino Väljas.
- July – Intermovement was established.
- In Estonia, 300,000 demonstrated for independence.
- The Estonian language became the official language of Estonia.
- 16 November – The Supreme Soviet of the Estonian SSR declared that Estonia is "sovereign" but stopped short of declaring independence.

== Births ==
- 6 December – Sandra Nurmsalu, musician
- 17 December –
  - Liisa Ehrberg, racing cyclist
  - Grethe Grünberg, ice dancer

== Deaths ==
- 21 September – Salme Nõmmik, economic geographer and professor

== See also ==
- 1988 in Estonian television
