= Pehmed ja karvased =

Estonian television series

Pehmed ja karvased (lit. 'The Soft and the Furry') is an Estonian TV programme. The programme, partially inspired by the (now cancelled) NTV programme of Kukly, uses a number of puppets to depict Estonian politicians, celebrities and metaphors, and features satirical discussion between these puppets.

The programme is directed by Karin Nurm. Acting producer is Jüri Jaanus, and producer is Raivo Suviste. The screenwriter is Toomas Kall; artist is Hardi Volmer; composer is Ardo Ran Varres. Puppet masters are Tiiu Kirsipuu, Natalia Hein, Külli Jaama, Ene Mellov, Ants Mölder. The puppets are played by Anu Lamp, Piret Kalda, Tõnu Oja, Tiit Sukk, Peeter Tammearu.
