= Oleg Sõnajalg =

Estonian businessman (1959–2025)

- Born: Oleg Vitjuk; 5 October 1959; Tallinn, then part of Estonian SSR, Soviet Union
- Died: 17 May 2025 (aged 65); Eura, Finland
- Cause of death: Helicopter crash
- Occupation: Businessman

Oleg Sõnajalg (born Oleg Vitjuk; 5 October 1959 – 17 May 2025) was an Estonian businessman. Born in Tallinn, he was known as part of the Sõnajalg family, which also included his brother Andres Sõnajalg and their wives, twin sisters Siiri and Viivi Sõnajalg. He co-founded the TV channel TV1.

With his wife Viivi (1962–2021), Sõnajalg raised five children. After his wife's death, he was in a relationship with Catherine Raudvere. They first met in October 2021. Oleg and Catherine became engaged in 2023 on the island of La Gomera.

Sõnajalg died on 17 May 2025 in a helicopter crash, near Eura Airfield in Finland. He was one of the pilots involved in the collision.
