= Teet Kallas =

Estonian writer and former politician

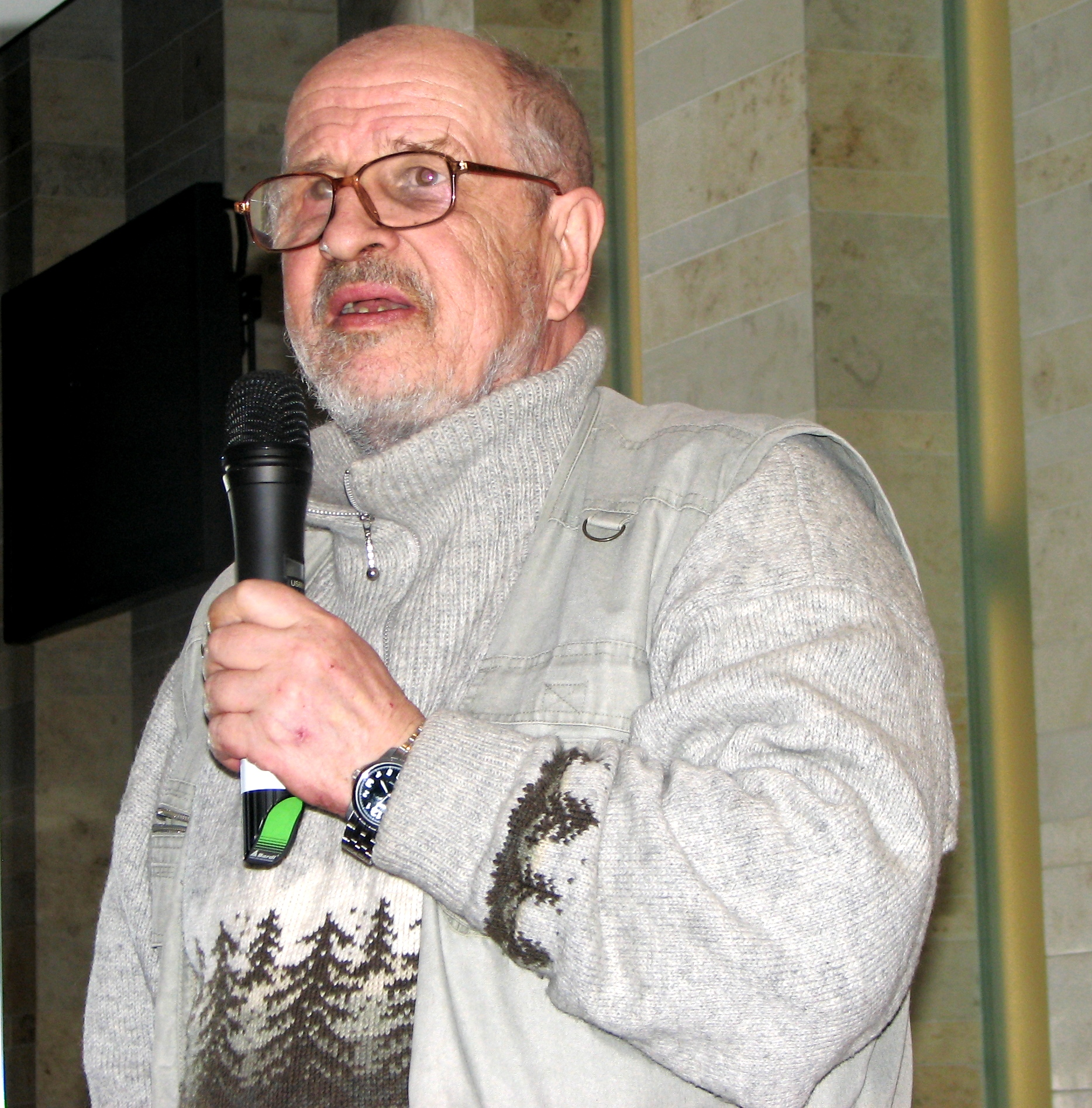
Kallas in 2010

Teet Kallas (born 6 April 1943) is an Estonian writer and former politician, most notable for voting for the Estonian restoration of Independence.

== Early life and education ==
Born in Tallinn, Kallas attended middle school in Tallinn from 1954 to 1962. He left the school without a degree. From 1962 to 1965, he served as a soldier in the Red Army in Palanga. He then began his literary and journalistic career.

== Career ==
In 1958, Kallas debuted as a writer in short prose in Estonian newspapers. After a few short prose texts and writing youth literature, his debut novel, Nii palju päikest, was released in 1964.

In 1965 and 1966, Kallas served as a literary editor on Estonian television before being employed by the editorial office of Looming from 1968 to 1970. Subsequently, he wrote for Estonian newspapers. Among other things, he was an editor for Vaba Maa, Sõnumileht and Postimees.

In 1969, Kallas was arrested by the KGB, who accused him of anti-Soviet propaganda. He spent several months in prison. There, he wrote his surrealist novel Heliseb-kõliseb..., which was released in 1972. In 1972, he joined the Estonian Writers Association. In the 1980s, he was a member of the board of the writers' association.

Kallas' novel Niguliste ("St. Nicholas' Church") was written between 1967 and 1972. It appeared only after the end of Soviet rule in Estonia in 1990 in a revised and expanded two-volume edition: "The novel is a typical description of a 'lost generation', their dreams and ideals lose and perish, and as such, it was a post-1968 document. Its failure to appear in the early 1970s, however, was more attributable to the author's laziness than to censorship, for internal criticism was by no means devastating or insurmountable. Kallas just turned to other things, which is why the novel was left lying."

Kallas also wrote radio dramas as well as screenplays for television films and series, such as the successful television series Õnne 13. In addition, he translated prose from Russian (Vasily Aksyonov, Alexander Grin) and English (Stephen King).

From 1979 to 1990, Kallas was a member of the Communist Party of Estonia. During the period of transition between the end of the Soviet Union and the regaining of Estonian independence, he co-chaired the parliamentary group of the democratic opposition movement, the Popular Front of Estonia, and voted for the Estonian restoration of Independence. Subsequently, Kallas was active in various political parties. Since 1998, he has been an independent.

== Fictional works (selection) ==
- Nii palju päikest (Novel, 1964)
- Puiesteede kummaline valgus (Collection of short stories, 1968)
- Verine padi (Collection of short stories, 1971)
- Varjud vikerkaarel (Narratives for adolescents, 1972)
- Heliseb-kõliseb... (Novel, 1972)
- Neli vestlust armastused (Drama, 1972)
- Viimane mõrv (Collection of short stories, 1975)
- Õhtuvalgus (Collection of short stories, 1977)
- Insener Paberiti juhtum (Collection of short stories, 1977)
- Corrida (Novel, 1979; film adaptation in 1981)
- Eiseni tänav (Novel, 1979)
- Väikesed hobused särava vikerkaare all (Stories, 1980)
- Hei, teie seal! (Collection of short stories, 1980)
- Muljeid kirjandusmaastikult (smaller writings from the years 1963–1981, 1982)
- Arvi kamin (Collection of short stories, 1982)
- Janu (Novel, 1983)
- Öö neljandas mikrorajoonis (Short stories and stories from the years 1979–1983, 1985)
- Kes tõttab öisele rongile (Satirical novel, 1988)
- Niguliste (Novel in two volumes, 1990)
- Naine lõvi seljas (Lyrical anthology of the years 1961–1989, 1990)
- Jää hüvasti, Mr. Shakespeare (Satirical novel, 1995)
- Käsi (Gothic fictional novel, 1997)

== Personal life ==
Kallas is married to Weimar-born journalist and translator Alla Kallas (born 1946). He was the younger brother of the Estonian graphic artist and cartoonist Olimar Kallas (1929-2006). They currently live in Laulasmaa, on the coast of the Baltic Sea.

== Awards ==
- 5th Class of the Estonian Order of the National Coat of Arms (received 23 February 2002)
- 3rd Class of the Estonian Order of the National Coat of Arms (received 23 February 2006)
