= 1983 in Estonian television =

This is a list of Estonian television related events from 1983.

== Debuts ==
- 30 October – television series "Prillitoos" started. The series was led by Hagi Šein.

== See also ==
- 1983 in Estonia
