= 1971 in Estonian television =

This is a list of Estonian television related events from 1971.

== Births ==
- 27 January - Karin Tammaru, actress
- 14 February - Karmel Eikner, TV host
- 16 June - Eva Püssa, actress
- 3 November - Piret Laurimaa, actress
- 16 November - Annely Peebo, mezzo-soprano and host of Eurovision Song Contest 2002
- 6 December - Katariina Unt, actress
- 25 December - Ain Mäeots, actor and director
