= 1957 in Estonian television =

This is a list of Estonian television related events from 1957.

== Events ==
- 20 October – first advertisement in television. The advertisement lasted 2 minutes.

== See also ==
- 1957 in Estonia
