= 1964 in Estonian television =

This is a list of Estonian television related events from 1964.

== Events ==
- November – new television mast was erected in Pärnu.

== See also ==
- 1964 in Estonia
