= 1959 in Estonian television =

This is a list of Estonian television related events from 1959.

== Debuts ==
4 September - television series TV ülikool began airing.

== Births ==
- 3 February – Laine Mägi, actress
- 11 March – Margus Oopkaup, actor (died 2025)

== See also ==
- 1959 in Estonia
