= 1973 in Estonian television =

This is a list of Estonian television related events from 1973.

== Debuts ==
- Mõmmi ja aabits

== Births ==
- 20 February - Indrek Saar, actor and politician
- 3 August - Aigi Vahing (:et), actress
- 14 December - Jan Uuspõld, actor
