= 1991 in Estonian television =

This is a list of Estonian television related events from 1991.

== Events ==
- August 20 - 1991 Soviet coup d'état attempt: ETV airs live coverage of Supreme Council session that voted for Estonian independence.

== Debuts ==
- 5 May - the television series "Teateid tegelikkusest" started.

== See also ==
- 1991 in Estonia
