= 1980 in Estonian television =

This is a list of Estonian television related events from 1980.

== Debuts ==
- 8. November - television series Maailmapilt debuted. The series was hosted by Mart Siimann.

== Births ==
- 7 January – Hele Kõrve, actress

== See also ==
- 1980 in Estonia
