= 1956 in Estonian television =

This is a list of Estonian television related events from 1956.

== Debuts ==
- 11 March - Aktuaalne kaamera (or, simply AK), Estonian-language news programme. Eesti Televisioon (ETV).

== Births ==
- 9 June - Guido Kangur, actor
- 27 July - Reet Oja (:et), journalist
