= 1965 in Estonian television =

This is a list of Estonian television related events from 1965.

== Events ==
- 1 May – the film studio Eesti Telefilm was established. The studio was led by Ülo Raudmägi.

== See also ==
- 1965 in Estonia
