= 1969 in Estonian television =

This is a list of Estonian television related events from 1969.

== Births ==
- 1 May - Hannes Võrno, actor, comedian, and TV host
- 19 June - Marko Reikop, TV host
- 23 November - Üllar Saaremäe, actor
