= Kati Murutar =

Estonian writer and journalist

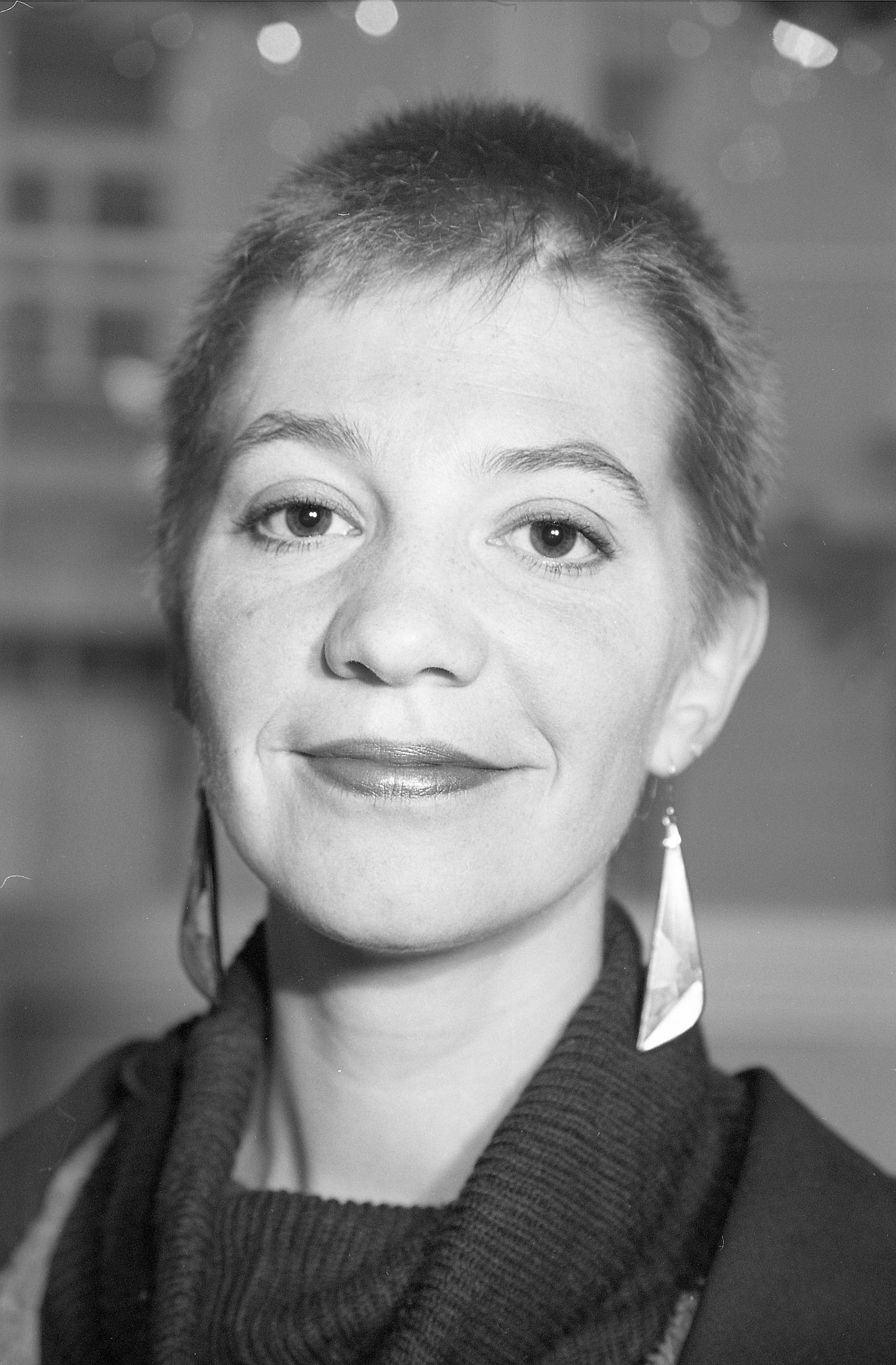
- Murutar in 1998
- Born: Kati Saari Vasar; 21 March 1967; Tallinn, then part of Estonian SSR, Soviet Union
- Occupations: Journalist; writer; screenwriter
- Years active: 1990-present
- Spouses: Alo Murutar (m. 1988; div. 2010); Peter Murdmaa (m. 2010; div. 2011); Arumets Vatmann (m. 2011; div. 2020); Robertiga Borodin (m. 2020; div. 2021)
- Children: 5

Kati Saara Murutar (née Vasar, 1988-2010 Murutar, 2010-2011 Murdmaa, 2011-2020 Kati Saara Vatmann, 2020-2021 Kati Saara Borodina; born on 21 March 1967) is an Estonian prose writer, screenwriter and journalist.

Murutar was born in Tallinn to opera tenor Harri Vasar and Ille Vasar. Her older half-brother was the artist Aarne Vasar (:et) and her younger brother is opera baritone Lauri Vasar. She is one of the authors of television series Õnne 13 (partly based on her book series Õnne tänava lood I-III).

== Biography ==
Born as Kati Saara Vasar in Tallinn, on 21 March 1967 to Harri Vasar and Ille Vasar. She spent most of her childhood Pärnu. From 1985 to 1990, she studied journalism at the University of Tartu, where she then went on to work for several magazines. In 1992, she released her first novel Naisena sündinud which became very popular in newly independent Estonia. Through the depiction of themes not commonly seen before, such as a young woman's sex life, she helped spark a new trend in Estonian literature. She then published in 1995 her novel Abitu, which went on receive recognition at the 1994 Faatum novel competition. In 1995, she joined the Estonian Writers’ Union and then in 1998, the Estonian Association of Journalists.

Since 2022, she has taught Estonian language and literature online and at the Kehtna Vocational Education Centre.

== Personal life ==
Murutar has both an older brother, Aarne Vasar, and a younger brother, Lauri Vasar. In total, Murutar has been married 4 times. Murutar first married Alo Murutar, with whom she had 5 children with. They are in order of oldest to youngest: Richard, Margaret Katist, Brigita Pruul born 1997, Aleksander Murutar, Maria Indirale. Following her daughter Margaret Katist giving birth, Murutar as since been a grandmother. Kati Murutar then got a divorce from Alo, where she also got custody over her daughters. Alo Murutar has since remarried with Laine Randjärv, the former Minister of Culture.

In 2010, she remarried with Peter Murdmaa, a film-maker, but the couple divorced after 5 months in 2011. Then in May 2011, she married Arumets Vatmann but were divorced in 2020. Her last marriage was with Robertiga Borodin in the summer of 2020. Borodin had spent the previous years in Uganda where he occasionally visited again after his marriage, of which the two lived together on a farm in Altveski, Estonia. However the relationship deteriorated, the couple ultimately separated in 2021. She lives largely self-sufficient on her farm in Altveski with Maria Indriale.

== Works ==
- "Naisena sündinud". Pärnu: Perona 1992. 214 pp
- "Mina ise ju!" Tartu: Elmatar 1993. 253 pp
- "Abitu". Tallinn: Faatum 1995. 236 pp
- "Õnne tänava lood I-III". Tartu: Elmatar 1997
- "Mustlasena sündinud". Tartu: Elmatar 1999
- "Igavestel alleedel". Tallinn: Ilo 2003. 421 pp
- "Eedeni aed". Tallinn: Eesti Ekspress 2007. 256 pp
- "Naisena sündinud kakskümmend aastat hiljem I-II", 2008
- "… ja mere ääres väike maja", 2009
- "Jänku-Jussi lood", 2010, 55pp
- "Anita ja UFO", 2014
- "Tuusik teisele kaldale", 2014
- "Mustrimuutjad", 2016
- "Täisring, I-III", 2016
- "Südamesalu salavägi" 2017
- "Tartu da Vinci - Hando Kruuv", 2020
- "Viljandi Piia Gambia", 2021
