= 1960 in Estonian television =

This is a list of Estonian television related events from 1960.

== Events ==
- 26 January – first program was broadcast from Kohtla-Järve television mast (135 m).

== See also ==
- 1960 in Estonia
