= 1992 in Estonia =

- Decades: 1970s; 1980s; 1990s; 2000s; 2010s
- See also: Other events of 1992; Timeline of Estonian history

This article lists events that occurred during 1992 in Estonia.

== Events ==
- Estonia held a referendum on its constitution.
- Heinrich Mark and the government in exile appointed by him cede their credentials to the newly elected Riigikogu.
- Lennart Meri was elected President of Estonia.
- 20 June – The Soviet ruble was replaced with kroon.

== See also ==
- 1992 in Estonian football
- 1992 in Estonian television
