= 1989 in Estonia =

- Decades: 1960s; 1970s; 1980s; 1990s; 2000s
- See also: Other events of 1989; Timeline of Estonian history

This article lists events that occurred during 1989 in Estonia.

== Incumbents ==
- Chairman of the Presidium of the Supreme Soviet - Arnold Rüütel

== Events ==
- 14 January – Estonian Olympic Committee is re-established. Now Estonian athletes can compete under Estonian flag.
- 18 January – Estonian language was named to the state language and Estonian tricolor flag was reinstated as the official flag.
- March – elections to all-Union Congress of People's Deputies. Most of the Estonian seats (27 out of 36) were won by Estonian Popular Front (EPF), Intermovement won 5 seats. Estonian National Independence Party (ENIP) refused to participate on elections, but proposed an alternative parliament (Congress of Estonia).
- August – a new electoral law was proposed. The law tried to increase the residency requirements for voters and candidates. Due to strong opposition by ethnic Russians, the law didn't come into force.
- 23 August – Two million indigenous people of Estonia, Latvia and Lithuania, then still occupied by the Soviet Union, joined hands to demand freedom and independence, forming an uninterrupted 600 km human chain called the Baltic Way.
- November – Estonian Supreme Soviet announced that the decision from the year 1940 (i.e. the decision joining of Estonia to USSR) is annulled.
- After 44 years, the Estonian flag was raised on the Pikk Hermann castle tower.

== Births ==
- 4 January – Veiko Porkanen, actor
- 20 January – Piret Krumm, actress
- 4 February –
  - Märt Pius, actor
  - Priit Pius, actor
- 8 February – Karl-Andreas Kalmet, actor
- 2 April – Liis Lass, actress
- 16 May – Pääru Oja, actor
- 10 October – Simeoni Sundja, actor
- 10 November – Adeele Jaago, actress

== Deaths ==
- 14 December – Ants Eskola, actor and singer

== See also ==
- 1989 in Estonian television
