= 1970 in Estonian television =

This is a list of Estonian television related events from 1970.

== Debuts ==
- 17 May - television series "Laulame neid laule jälle" started.

== See also ==
- 1970 in Estonia
