= Dajan Ahmet =

Estonian actor and stage director

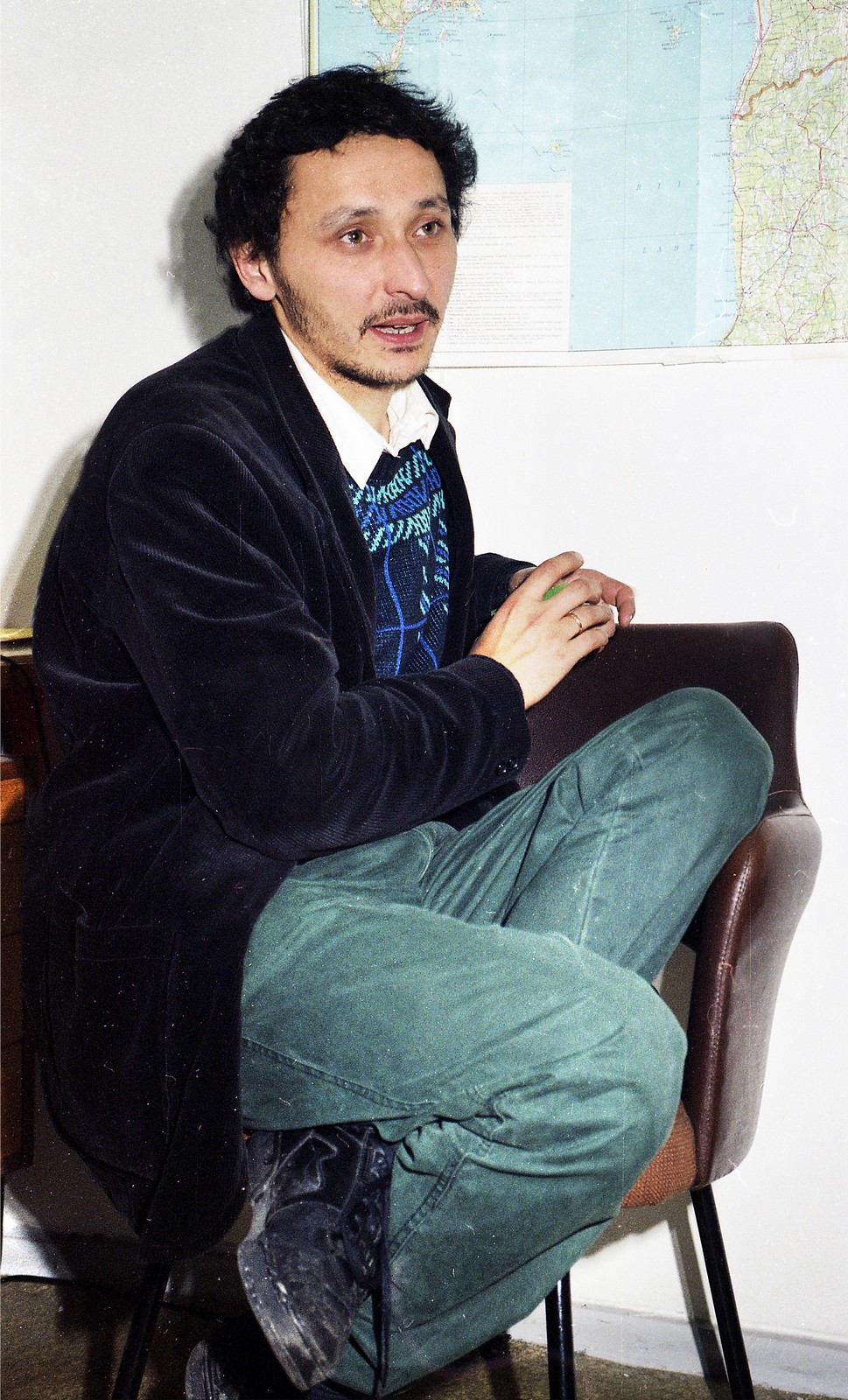
Dajan Ahmet in 1994

Dajan Ahmet (né Ahmetov, Tatar: Даян Әхмәтов, romanized: Dayan Äxmätov, also known by the pseudonyms of Jaan Võõramaa and Võõramaa Jean; 22 January 1962 – 4 November 2006) was an Estonian actor and stage director of Tatar heritage.

== Biography ==
Ahmet was born in Tallinn, Soviet-occupied Estonia. He was a 1988 graduate of the Tallinn State Conservatory. Ahmet was one of the founders and leaders of the Salong-Teater and the Lasteteater Trumm in Tallinn. In the summer of 2006, Ahmet joined the Rakvere Theatre.

On 4 November 2006, Ahmet was among a group of seven individuals, including actors Anne Veesaar, Rednar Annus, Ksenia Argakova, and Marika Korolev, that were travelling to the Vanemuine theatre in Tartu in a Hyundai Trajet. Near Mõhküla in Põltsamaa Parish, the vehicle collided with a Ford Mondeo. Ahmet was killed instantly. The driver of the Trajet, another male passenger, Annus, Veesaar, Argakova, and Korolev were all injured. A man and woman in the Ford Mondeo also died at the scene of the accident and two small children, passengers in the Mondeo, were also injured.

== Sources ==
- Sirp 10 November 2006: Dajan Ahmet 22. I 1962 – 4. XI 2006
