= 1991 in Estonia =

- Decades: 1970s; 1980s; 1990s; 2000s; 2010s
- See also: Other events of 1991; Timeline of Estonian history

This article lists events that occurred during 1991 in Estonia.

== Events ==
- 3 March – 1991 Estonian independence referendum.
- Latvia and Estonia voted for independence from the Soviet Union.
- The United States recognized the independence of Estonia, Latvia and Lithuania.
- 20 August – The Supreme Soviet of the Estonian SSR recognized Estonian independence from the Soviet Union.
- 22 August – Iceland is the first state to recognize the independent Republic of Estonia.
- 29 August – Sweden is the first country which opens an embassy in Estonia.
- 6 September – The Soviet Union recognized the independence of the Baltic States.

== Births ==
- 25 June - Liisi Rist, racing cyclist
- 10 November - Elina Nechayeva, soprano

== See also ==
- 1991 in Estonian football
- 1991 in Estonian television
