= 1987 in Estonia =

- Decades: 1960s; 1970s; 1980s; 1990s; 2000s
- See also: Other events of 1987; Timeline of Estonian history

This article lists events that occurred during 1987 in Estonia.

== Events ==
- Singing demonstrations against Soviet occupation was begun.
- 23 August – about 2,000 demonstrators commemorated the anniversary of Molotov–Ribbentrop Pact.
- Estonian History Museum was inaugurated.

== Births ==
- 17 May – Ott Lepland, singer
- 22 October – Eerik Aps, politician

== Deaths ==
- 2 July – Karl Linnas, alleged Nazi collaborator
- 17 July – Kristjan Palusalu, heavyweight wrestler
- 1 August – Juho Matsalu, Estonian footballer
- 5 September – Georg Ots, singer and actor

== See also ==
- 1987 in Estonian television
