= 1958 in Estonian television =

This is a list of Estonian television related events from 1958.

== Events ==
- December – wooden telemast (65 m) was erected in Pärnu.

== Births ==
- 4 July – Tõnu Oja, actor
- 9 August – Arvo Kukumägi, actor (d. 2017)

== See also ==
- 1958 in Estonia
