= 1982 in Philippine television =

The following is a list of events affecting Philippine television in 1982. Events listed include television show debuts, finales, cancellations, and channel launches, closures and rebrandings, as well as information about controversies and carriage disputes.

== Premieres ==
Date	Show	Refs
March 7	PBA on Vintage Sports on City2	
April 5	RPN NewsBreak on RPN 9	
August 29	The Penthouse Live! on GMA 7	
November 1	The 11:30 Report on GMA 7	
December 5	Batang Quiapo on RPN 9	

=== Unknown ===
- Ang Batasan on MBS 4
- Meet the Press on MBS 4
- Network Line on MBS 4
- Love, Lea on MBS 4
- Dapitan 1896 on MBS 4
- Patok na Patok on MBS 4
- Barangayan on MBS 4
- All You Need is Love on MBS 4
- Kapiteryang Pinoy on RPN 9
- Dance 10 on RPN 9
- News at Seven Davao on GMA Davao
- 9 to 5 on GMA 7
- Study In The Word on IBC 13

== Programs transferring networks ==
Date	Show	No. of seasons	Moved from	Moved to
March 7	Philippine Basketball Association	8	MBS 4	City2

== Finales ==
- January 1: Nang Dahil sa Pag-Ibig on GMA 7
- August 22: Penthouse Seven on GMA 7
- December 27: Quincy, M.E. season 7 on GMA 7
- December 30: CHiPs (season 5) on GMA 7

=== Unknown ===
- Geym na Geym on RPN 9
- Barkada sa 9 on RPN 9
- Network Line on MBS 4
- Dapitan 1896 on MBS 4
- Patok na Patok on MBS 4
- Barangayan on MBS 4
- Ice Hockey on MBS 4
- All You Need is Love on MBS 4
- Kapiteryang Pinoy on RPN 9
- Charlie's Angels on GMA 7

== Births ==
- April 18 - Franzen Fajardo
- May 12 – Donnie Nietes
- May 17 – Kaye Abad
- June 2 – Wendy Valdez
- June 16 – Jodi Sta. Maria
- July 23 – Zanjoe Marudo
- August 12 – Iza Calzado
- October 4 – Grace Lee
- October 10 - Erik Santos
- November 29 – Paolo Ballesteros

== See also ==
- 1982 in television
