= 1955 in Estonian television =

This is a list of Estonian television related events from 1955.

== Events ==
- 29 June – Tallinna Televisioonistuudio (later name Estonian Television) was formed.

== See also ==
- 1955 in Estonia
