= 1978 in Estonian television =

This is a list of Estonian television related events from 1978.

== Debuts ==
- 19 October - television series "Ajurünnak" started. The series was hosted by Rein Järlik and Hagi Šein.

== See also ==
- 1978 in Estonia
