= 1990 in Estonian television =

This is a list of Estonian television related events from 1990.

== Events ==
- 21 June – Mart Siimann became the chief director of ETV.

== See also ==
- 1990 in Estonia
