= 1977 in Estonian television =

This is a list of Estonian television related events from 1977.

== Births ==
- 20 May - Katrin Pärn, actress
- 8 December - Maarja Jakobson, actress
