= 1975 in Estonian television =

This is a list of Estonian television related events from 1975.

== Births ==
- 2 May - Taavi Teplenkov, actor
- 22 May - Harriet Toompere, actress
- 9 July - Jüri Nael, dancer, actor, and TV host
- 17 December - Hilje Murel, actress
