= 1992 in Estonian television =

This is a list of Estonian television related events from 1992.

== Events ==
- 9 May – Eurovision Song Contest 1992 was shown live for the first time showed on Eesti Televisioon. The contest was commentated by Ivo Linna and Olavi Pihlamägi.

== Networks and services ==
=== Channels ===
==== New channels ====
- 21 September - RTV/ETV
- 27 December – Alo TV

== See also ==
- 1992 in Estonia
