= 1961 in Estonian television =

This is a list of Estonian television related events from 1961.

== Events ==
- 30 December – first edition of the newspaper "Televisioon" was issued. The newspaper was in both, in Estonian- and in Russian-language.

== See also ==
- 1961 in Estonia
