= 1981 in Philippine television =

The following is a list of events affecting Philippine television in 1981. Events listed include television show debuts, finales, cancellations, and channel launches, closures and rebrandings, as well as information about controversies and carriage disputes.

== Events ==
- February 17–21: Highlights of pontifical visit of Pope John Paul II to the country are aired on national television stations with MBS and RPN airing these nationwide via satellite to promote satellite broadcasts.
- December 6-15: MBS-4 airs live the events of the 1981 SEA Games, the first time the Philippines was host of this regional event.

=== Unknown ===
- Banahaw Broadcasting Corporation (BBC 2) rebranded as City 2 Television.

== Premieres ==
Date	Show
September 7	Nang Dahil sa Pag-Ibig on GMA 7

=== Unknown ===
- T.O.D.A.S.: Television's Outrageously Delightful All-Star Show on IBC 13
- Turn on 13 on IBC 13
- America's Top 10 on IBC 13
- Try God on IBC 13
- Star Blazers on IBC 13
- Tepok Bunot on City2
- Manila Files on City2
- Sesame Street on City2
- The Other Side of Alma on MBS 4
- She! on MBS 4
- Miss Ellaneous on MBS 4
- MBS Sports on MBS 4
- Rhythm of the City on MBS 4
- The Governor Reports on MBS 3 Cebu
- NewsWatch Pilipino Edition on RPN 9
- Gulong ng Buhay on RPN 9
- Tambakan Alley on RPN 9
- Helpline sa 9 on RPN 9
- Coney Reyes – Mumar on the Set on RPN 9
- Talambuhay on RPN 9
- Geym Na Geym on RPN 9
- Barkada Sa 9 on RPN 9
- Fight Night on RPN 9
- RPN Sports Library on RPN 9
- ABC Wide World of Sports on RPN 9
- Chat Silayan Drama Studio on GMA 7
- Real People on GMA 7
- Mga Balita sa Kilum-Kilum on GMA 7 Cebu
- News at Seven Davao on GMA 5 Davao
- Isyu on RPN 9
- Fight Night on RPN 9

== Programs transferring networks ==
Date	Show	No. of seasons	Moved from	Moved to
Unknown	Miss Ellaneous	—N/a	GMA Network	MBS 4

== Finales ==
- November 28: PBA on MBS on MBS 4

=== Unknown ===
- T.O.D.A.S.: Television's Outrageously Delightful Afternoon Show on IBC 13
- Apat Na Sikat on IBC 13
- Lucky 13 on IBC 13
- The Wild Wild West on IBC 13
- Star Blazers on IBC 13
- Ladies and Gentlemen... on BBC 2 (now City2)
- Prrrt... Foul! on BBC 2 (now City2)
- Manila Files on City2
- Coney Reyes-Mumar Drama Studio on GMA 7
- Sapak na Sapak Talaga! on GMA 7
- Sikat Family on GMA 7
- Prinsipe Abante on GMA 7
- Ms. Ellaneous on GMA 7
- TJ sa GMA on GMA 7
- Who Knows That? on GMA 7
- Coffee with Us on GMA 7 Cebu
- Eight Is Enough on GMA 7
- Gulong ng Palad on RPN 9

== Births ==
- March 7 – Rica Peralejo, actress
- March 22 – Karylle, actress and host
- April 21 – Luis Manzano, actor and host
- May 12 – Dennis Trillo, actor
- May 22 - Andrei Felix II, news broadcaster and actor
- June 20 – Maricar Reyes, actress and endorser
- July 20 – Biboy Ramirez
- July 3 – Empoy Marquez, actor
- August 5 – Tanya Garcia
- October 19 - Christian Bautista, singer and actor
- October 29 – Angelika Dela Cruz, singer and actress
- November 1 – Coco Martin, actor, producer, and endorser
- November 18 – Gian Magdangal, singer and actor

== See also ==
- 1981 in television
