= 1983 in Estonia =

- Decades: 1960s; 1970s; 1980s; 1990s; 2000s
- See also: Other events of 1983; Timeline of Estonian history

This article lists events that occurred during 1983 in Estonia.

== Events ==
- Adamson-Eric Museum was opened.

== Births ==
- 1 June – Tõnis Sahk, long jumper

== See also ==
- 1983 in Estonian television
