= 1972 in Estonian television =

This is a list of Estonian television related events from 1972.

== Debuts ==
- 13 February - television series "Vaata kööki" started. The series was hosted by Lilian Kosenkranius.

== See also ==
- 1972 in Estonia
