= 1968 in Estonian television =

This is a list of Estonian television related events from 1968.

== Births ==
- 4 February - Marko Matvere, actor and singer
