= 1979 in Estonian television =

This is a list of Estonian television related events from 1979.

== Births ==
- 21 February - Maria Annus, actress
- 21 April - Karin Rask, actress
- 3 May - Ingrid Isotamm, actress
- 21 June - Ithaka Maria, singer and TV host
- 6 November - Gerli Padar, singer and TV host
- 21 December - Kristjan Sarv, actor
