= 1990 in Estonia =

- Decades: 1970s; 1980s; 1990s; 2000s; 2010s
- See also: Other events of 1990; Timeline of Estonian history

This article lists events that occurred during 1990 in Estonia.

== Events ==
- 22 February – The Estonian legislature affirmed the declaration, where immediate negotiations with Supreme Soviet of the Soviet Union were demanded to restore the independence of Estonia.
- 11-12 March – Congress of Estonia convened, and declared itself as constitutional representative of Estonian people.
- 18 March – elections to Supreme Soviet of Estonia. The most seats (43) were won by Estonian Popular Front.
- 30 March – Supreme Soviet of Estonia declared a transitional period for independence. In addition, the validity of Soviet power in Estonia was denied.
- 8 May – the first five articles of 1938 Constitution of Estonia was reinstated. In addition the formal name of independent Estonia (i.e. the Republic of Estonia) was restored; also state emblems, the flag and the hymn was restored. The Supreme Soviet is thereafter translated as the Supreme Council.
- mid-May – President of the Soviet Union annulled Estonia's declaration of independence. About 2,000 pro-Soviet activists tried to occupy the parliament building.
- 30 June-2 July – National Song and Dance Festival in Tallinn.
- 3 April – the leader of Estonian Popular Front Edgar Savisaar was elected to Prime Minister by Supreme Soviet of Estonia.
- Estonian School of Diplomacy was established.

== Births ==
- 4 October – Signy Aarna, footballer

== See also ==
- 1990 in Estonian television
