= 1976 in Dutch television =

This is a list of Dutch television related events from 1976.

== Events ==
- 18 February – Sandra Reemer is selected to represent Netherlands at the 1976 Eurovision Song Contest with her song "The Party's Over". She is selected to be the twenty-first Dutch Eurovision entry during Nationaal Songfestival held at Congresgebouw in The Hague.
- 3 April – The 21st Eurovision Song Contest is held at the Nederlands Congrescentrum in The Hague. The United Kingdom wins the contest with the song "Save Your Kisses for Me", performed by Brotherhood of Man.

== Debuts ==
- 4 January – Sesamstraat (1976–present).

== Television shows ==
=== 1950s ===
- NOS Journaal (1956–present)
- Pipo de Clown (1958–present)

== Births ==
- 23 July – Mark van Eeuwen, actor.
- 15 August – Koert-Jan de Bruijn, actor & TV presenter.
- 18 November – Lodewijk Hoekstra, TV presenter.
