= 1981 in Estonian television =

This is a list of Estonian television related events from 1981.

== Births ==
- 26 February - Märt Avandi, actor, TV host, and comedian
- 26 May - Eda-Ines Etti, singer and TV host
- 15 June - Veljo Reinik, actor
