= Jaan Kolberg =

Estonian film director and producer (born 1958)

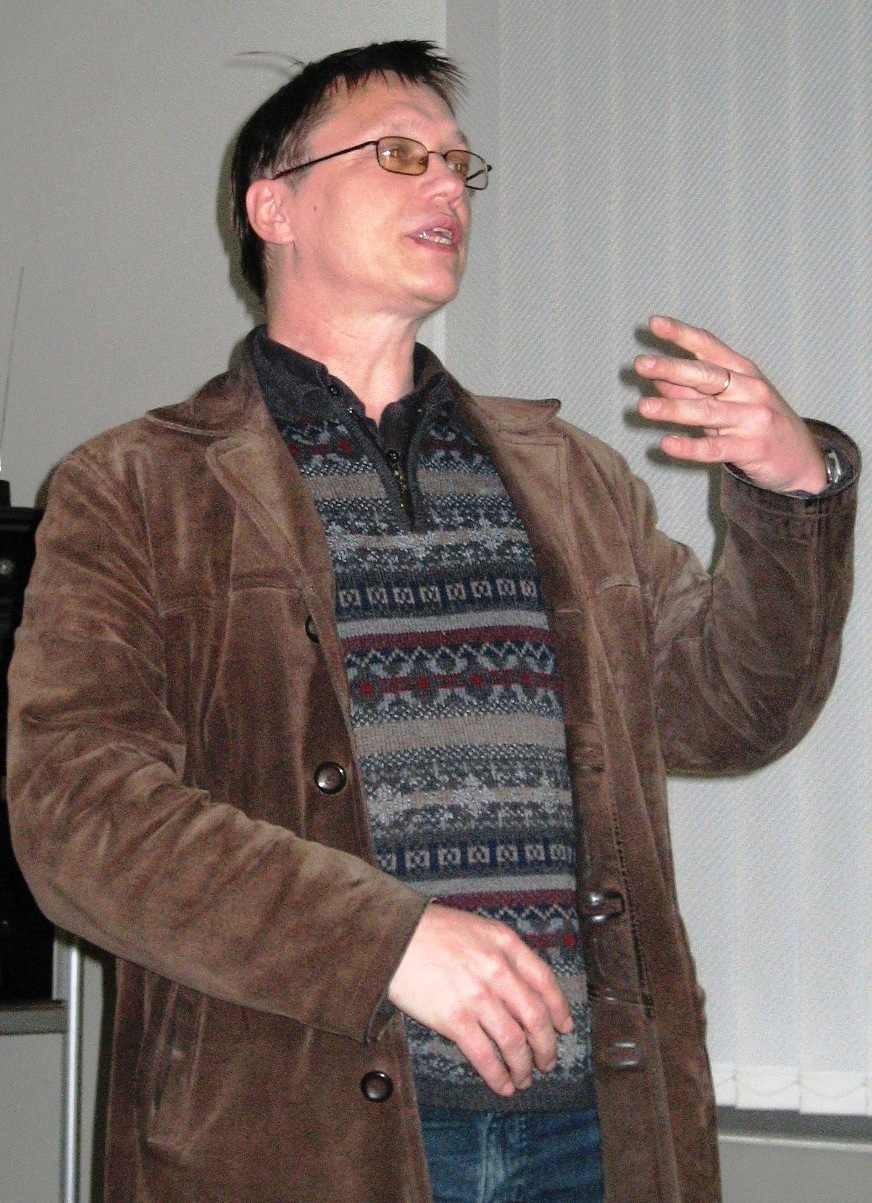
- Kolberg in 2010
- Born: 21 November 1958 (age 67); Pärnu, then part of Estonian SSR, Soviet Union
- Education: Tartu State University; All-Union State Institute of Cinematography
- Occupations: Film director; producer
- Years active: 1977–present
- Spouse: Terje Pennie (m. 1991)
- Children: 3

Jaan Kolberg (born 21 November 1958) is an Estonian film director and producer.

== Early life and education ==
Jaan Kolberg was born in Pärnu, where he attended primary and secondary schools. In 1976, he enrolled at Tartu State University, majoring in English. While at university, from 1977 until 1979, he participated as an actor at Evald Hermaküla's stage studio at the Vanemuine theatre.

After graduating from Tartu State University, Kolberg studied filmmaking at the All-Union State Institute of Cinematography (VGIK) in Moscow from 1985 until 1990.

== Career ==
In 2003 he established the production company Tristan (later Navona).

== Personal life ==
In 1991, he married actress Terje Pennie with whom he had 3 children.

== Filmography ==
- 2018: "Vello Salo. Igapäevaelu müstika" (documentary film)
- 2020 "Hüvasti, NSVL" (feature film)
