= 1984 in Estonian television =

This is a list of Estonian television related events from 1984.

== Births ==
- 6 January - Priit Loog, actor
- 6 February - Piret Järvis, singer, guitarist, and TV host
- 14 July- Britta Soll, actress
