= Seitse =

Former Estonian television channel

Coordinates: 59°26′4.58″N 24°46′5.56″E

- Country: Estonia
- Headquarters: Tallinn, Estonia

Ownership
- Owner: Eesti Meedia

History
- Launched: 7 July 2007; 19 years ago
- Closed: 31 December 2016; 9 years ago
- Replaced by: MyHits TV

Links
- Website: seitse.tv

Availability

Terrestrial
- Zuum TV: -

Seitse's first and previous logo from 2007 to 2014

Seitse ('Seven') was a private Estonian television channel. It includes culture and music for Estonians and Russians of ages 25–45. Music channel Seitse showed at least 400 music videos per day.

== History ==
At the beginning of 2010, Eesti Autorite Ühing requested to close the channel, as it did not have a license agreement with EAÜ as of January 1, 2010. EAU was not willing to renew the contract, because Seitse TV channel had consistently violated the terms of the previous contract and delayed the payment of license fees. The debt was liquidated within the same month.

The channel closed its activities on 31 December 2016 and was replaced by the new music channel MyHits TV.

== Shows ==
=== Music shows ===
- 2000+
- 2005+
- 2010+
- Party@KlubiTeater
- Parim Eesti Muusika
- Hommik Publikuga
- Head isu!
- 80 & 90
- Playlist
- Seitse Rockib!
- Tantsuparadiis
- ÖÖ7

=== Other shows ===
- Delfi Publik news
- Lastekas
