= 1981 in Dutch television =

This is a list of Dutch television related events from 1981.

== Events ==
- 11 March – Linda Williams is selected to represent Netherlands at the 1981 Eurovision Song Contest with her song "Het is een wonder". She is selected to be the twenty-sixth Dutch Eurovision entry during Nationaal Songfestival held at Zuidplein Theatre in Rotterdam.
- 4 April – The United Kingdom wins the Eurovision Song Contest with the song "Making Your Mind Up" by Bucks Fizz. The Netherlands finish in ninth place with their entry "Het is een wonder" by Linda Williams.

== Debuts ==
- 5 January – Jeugdjournaal (1981–present)

== Television shows ==
=== 1950s ===
- NOS Journaal (1956–present)

=== 1970s ===
- Sesamstraat (1976–present)

== Deaths ==
Date	Name	Age	Cinematic Credibility
5 February	Barend Barendse	73	Dutch sports reporter
