= 1982 in Estonian television =

This is a list of Estonian television-related events from 1982.

== Births ==
- 28 January - Mirtel Pohla, actress
- 17 June - Ursula Ratasepp, actress
- 29 June - Ott Sepp, actor, singer, writer & TV host
