= Astrid Kannel =

Estonian journalist

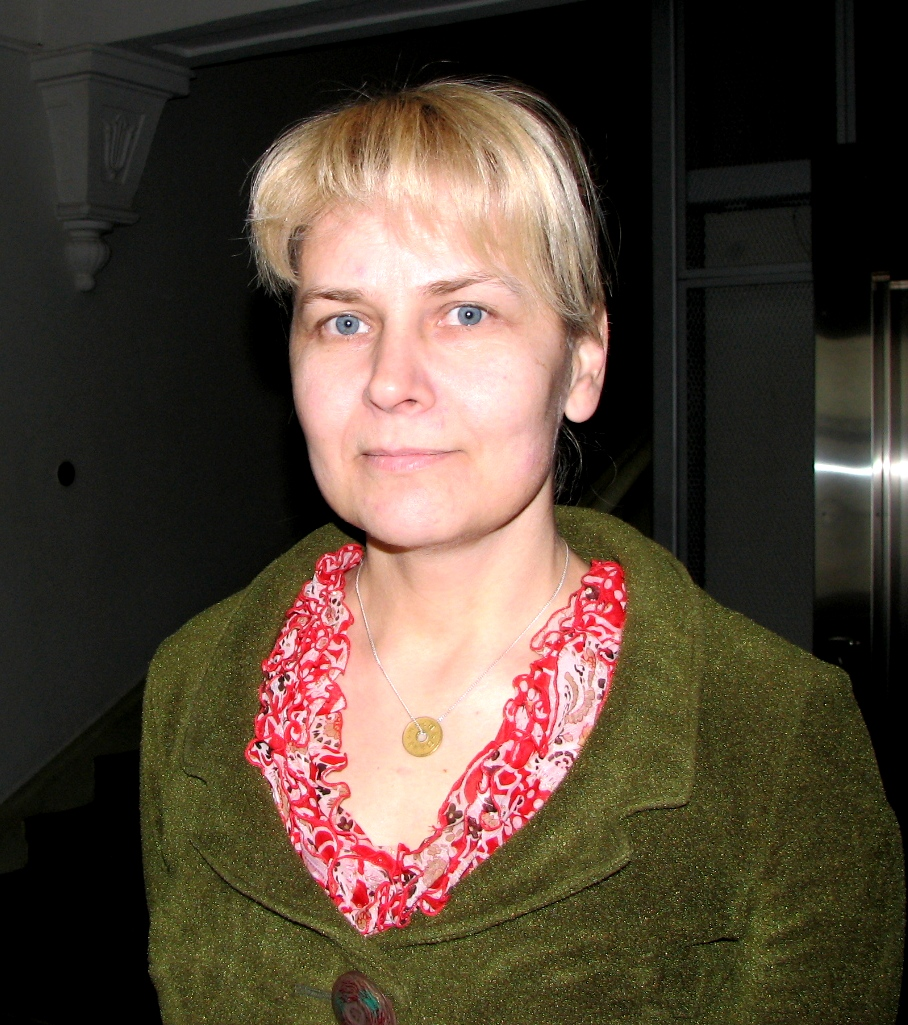
Kannel in 2011

Astrid Kannel (born 7 June 1967 in Haapsalu) is an Estonian television journalist.
