= 1976 in Estonian television =

This is a list of Estonian television related events from 1976.

== Births ==
- 26 April - Elisabet Reinsalu, actress
- 22 May - Külli Teetamm, actress
- 6 August - Andero Ermel, actor
- 16 August - Kadri Rämmeld, actress
- 26 September - Kersti Heinloo, actress
