= Artur Rinne =

Estonian singer

Artur Rinne (25 September 1910 Narva – 31 January 1984 Tallinn) was an Estonian singer (baritone), theatre director and television director. He is the Estonian singer who has been recorded the most.

In 1934 he graduated from Tallinn Conservatory. 1929-1937 he was a choir singer and 1937–1938 ja 1941–1944 a soloist at Estonia Theatre. From 1945 until 1949, he was the director of the Vanemuine theatre in Tartu. 1947–1950 and 1971–1980 he was a soloist at Estonian SSR State Philharmonic. In 1950, he was arrested by Soviet authorities and was placed within the gulag camp system; exiled to the Yertsevo prison camp in Arkhangelsk Oblast of northern Russia.

After he was released, from 1956 until 1970 he was a director at Eesti Televisioon and Eesti Telefilm.

Awards:

- 1960: Estonian SSR merited artist

In 1968 the autobiographical film Meie Artur was directed.
