= 1986 in Estonian television =

This is a list of Estonian television related events from 1986.

== Births ==
- 19 April - Henrik Kalmet, actor
- 18 November - Ragne Veensalu, actress
