= Andra Teede =

Estonian writer (born 1988)

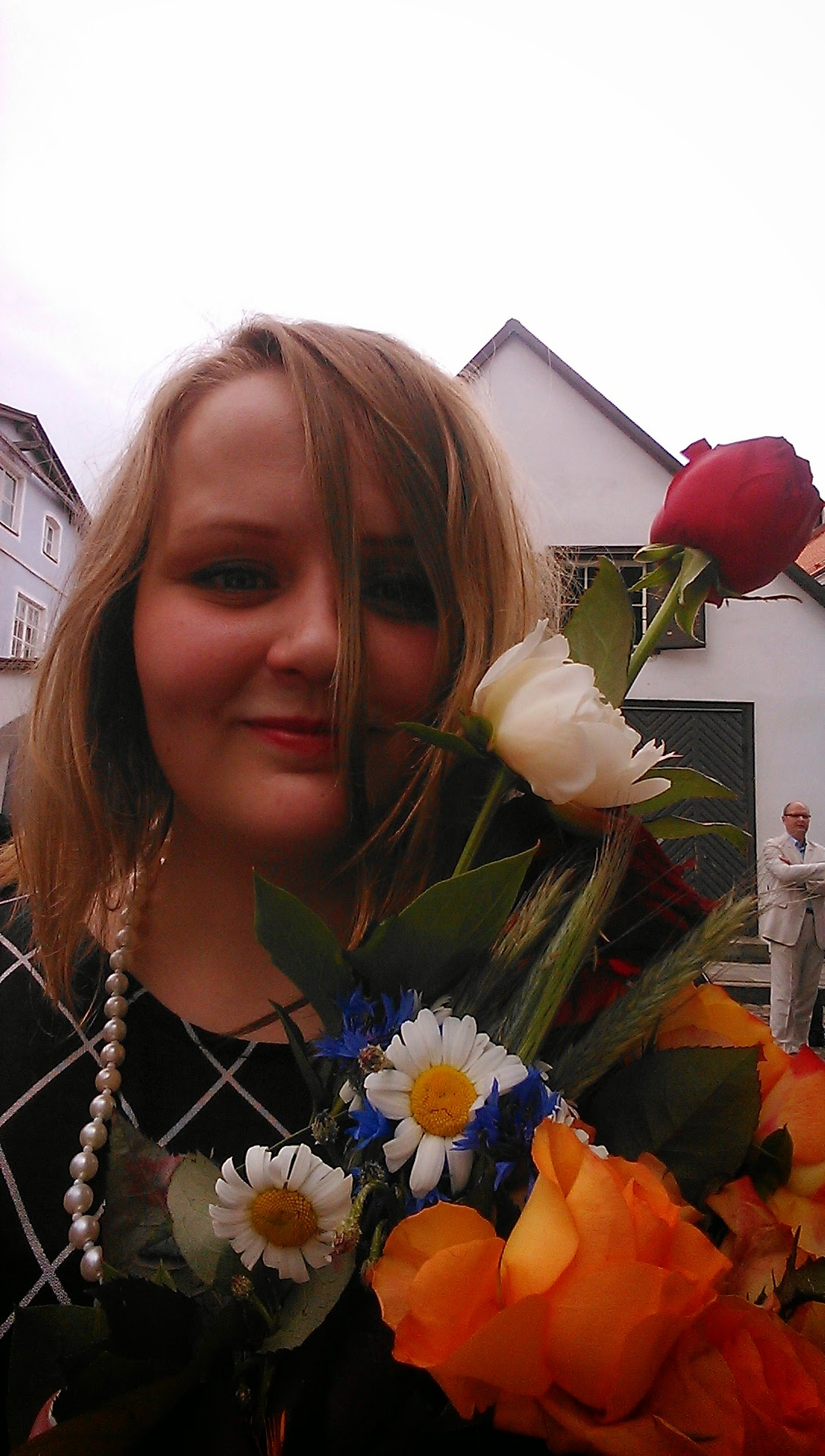
Teede in 2014

Andra Teede (born 23 September 1988) is an Estonian poet and dramaturge.

Teede was born and raised in Tallinn. She studied Estonian language and literature at the University of Tartu before enrolling in the drama department of the Estonian Academy of Music and Theatre from which she graduated in 2014 with a degree in dramaturgy.

Her poems have been published in collections including Contemporary Estonian Poetry (A Baltic Anthology Book 3) edited by Inara Cedrins.

Since 2014 she has been the writer of the long-running Estonian television series Õnne 13 (13 Happiness Street).

== Selected publications ==
- Teede, Andra; Paaver, Ene (2020). Esimene armastus. Tallinn: Eesti Draamateater. ISBN 9789949744824.
- Teede, Andra (2018). Pikad mehed, pikad elud. Tallinn: Mustvalge. ISBN 9789949519934. (Tall men, long lives)
- Teede, Andra (2014). 100% Andra Teede. Saarde; Pärnu: Jumalikud Ilmutused. ISBN 9789949519156.
- Teede, Andra (2013). Ühe jalaga põhjas. Tallinn: Kite. ISBN 9789949944439.
- Teede, Andra (2011). Käigud. Pärnu-Saarde: Ji. ISBN 9789949920013.
- Teede, Andra (2009). Atlas. Pärnu: Ji. ISBN 9789985992999.
- Teede, Andra (2007). Saage üle. Tallinn: Tänapäev. ISBN 9789985625347.
- Teede, Andra (2006). Takso Tallinna taevas. Tallinn: Verb. ISBN 9789985961575.
- Teede, Andra (2005). Väike kuri kevad. Tallinn: Eesti Keele Sihtasutus. ISBN 9789985791127.
