= Helgi Sallo =

Estonian singer and actress

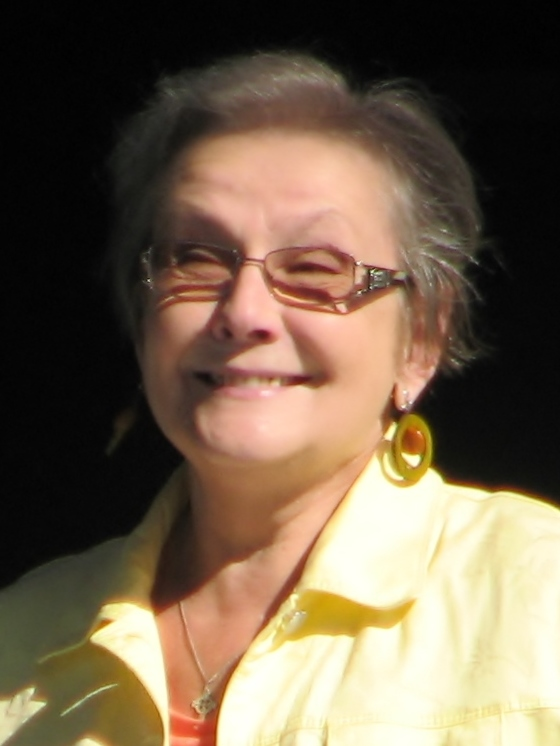
- Sallo in 2014
- Born: 10 August 1941 (age 84); Tallinn, Estonia
- Occupations: Singer; actress

Helgi Sallo (born 10 August 1941) is an Estonian singer and actress.

In 1965, she graduated from the ESSR Theatre Union’s Drama Studio in Tallinn (now, the Estonian Academy of Music and Theatre).

Sallo was married to opera singer Uno Heinapuu (et). Her daughter is actress Liina Vahtrik.

== Awards ==
- Honored Artist of the Estonian SSR (1975)
- Georg Ots Prize (1983).
- People's Artist of the Estonian SSR (1989)
- Suure Vankri Award (1996)
- Order of the White Star (2001)
- Tallinn Badge (2017)
