= 1985 in Estonian television =

This is a list of Estonian television related events from 1985.

== Births ==
- 20 May - Marta Laan, actress
- 12 June - Liisa Pulk, actress
- 23 August – Juss Haasma, actor
- 26 September – Lenna Kuurmaa, singer-songwriter and actress
