= 1987 in Estonian television =

This is a list of Estonian television related events from 1987.

== Births ==
- 11 January - Mikk Jürjens, actor, singer and TV presenter
- 4 April - Lauri Pedaja, actor and hairdresser
- 23 November - Vallo Kirs, actor
