= TV1 (Estonian TV channel) =

Estonian television channel

Coordinates: 59°26′43.62″N 24°47′59.32″E

- Country: Estonia

Programming
- Picture format: (4:3) SDTV

Ownership
- Owner: Polsat
- Key people: Vallo Toomet (chairman); Andres Sõnajalg (co-founder); Oleg Sõnajalg (co-founder)

History
- Launched: February 10, 1997
- Closed: October 3, 2001

TV1 was a private Estonian television channel. It included news, current affairs, sports and general entertainment. The channel was founded by AS Eesti Sõltumatu Televisioon (Estonian Independent Television) of the Sõnajalgs in 1997 and was sold to Polsat in 2000. Since Polsat gave excessive amounts of kroons to TV1 to pay its debts, coupled with uncertainties during the Sõnajalg administration, the channel shut down on October 3, 2001.

== History ==
Founded in February 1997 after a series of delays by the Sõnajalg family (Oleg and Andres Sõnajalg), the owners wanted TV1 to be a news-intensive channel. The initial plan was to broadcast a three-hour news schedule with a half-hour program repeated during the period, being interrupted when important stories were being held. News were the primary pillar in the experimental broadcasts, movies and cartoons were secondary, according to Sõnajalg. TV3's director of programming Toomas Lepp was concerned about the market needing a news-intensive service, as well as concerns over the advertising market. Lepp said that if TV1's market share was between 20 and 30%, it would survive. The launch of the channel was delayed several times before settling on 10 February 1997 as the new launch date. The channel broadcast on the same frequencies as the defunct TIPP TV (1995-1996) and increased its output from 25 kilometers to 80 kilometers. Oleg Sõnajalg was still finishing some details regarding the transmitter connections. By January 1998, it started satellite distribution by using Telenor's new satellite uplink station in Bratislava. In June 1998 the shares were transferred to Ühispank under the condition that it would invest 25 million kroons for the channel within a month. The bank invested such value on delay. Vallo Toomet, who was in charge of reformulating the channel, paid the salary based on loan contracts. Therefore, the company had to delay a 10 million kroon payment in state debts.

On 14 November 1998, the Sõnajalgs left Estonia, having quit TV1's management because they were no longer operating in the station for its workers, but for their personal interests. Oleg and Andres Sõnajalg wrote a document that would have allowed them to carry out the decision of the TV1 supervisory board to leave the mediation of ORTV advertising to themselves, but not to Ühispank and TV1. According to unconfirmed data, the brothers tried to take control of the entire ORTV project and disconnect it from TV1.

Vallo Toomet, Chairman of the Board of Directors of TV1, located the document prepared on a computer on 12 November, the eve of the Fiscal Council meeting. The Sõnajalgs were informed of their exclusion from the council the next day, just before the Council meeting. TV1 and Ühispank executives used gang language when commenting on the Sõnajalg's expulsion of the council.

Janek Mäggi, Deputy Governor of Ühispank, and Vallo Toomet, Chairman of the Board of Directors of TV1, said nothing about the removal of Oleg and Andres Sõnajalg from the Supervisory Board. According to Toomet, TV1 didn't demand anything from the Sõnajalgs. A staff member said that there was possibly retaliation from TV1. The Sõnajalgs later fled to Stockholm and, according to several reports, fled to either the Netherlands or Portugal. There was speculation over whether of not the expulsion of the Sõnajalgs was related to the TV1 scandal.

In February 1999, the Sõnajalgs financed the establishment of TV1 with debts of 23 million kroons to Ühispank. In order to get the money back, the bank intended to sell the family's property. Ühispank announces that during 1999 the television station was to be sold for 90 million kroons.

In March 1999, representatives of the Finnish network MTV3 went to Tallinn to negotiate the sale of TV1. Ühispank president Ain Hanschmidt said that the sale wasn't in a hurry because the station was working normally and that there were no problems at the time. The Sõnajalgs didn't answer to the news of the sale of the station.

In December 1999, Ühispank's shares were sold to Lõhmus, Haavel & Viisemann. Rait Killandi, up until then the advertising manager, became the director of programming. According to Killandi, the station was still operating at a loss, albeit ten times smaller compared to the one it had under its previous owners and had no debts to its employees.

By then a plan was announced suggesting that the channel was to be sold to the Polish commercial network Polsat, owned by businessman Zygmunt Solorz-Żak. Polsat also bought LNT in Latvia and BTV in Lithuania, with the aim of merging the three channels' managements and establishing a Baltic television network.

Polsat was now owning TV1 in December 2000. In May 2001, owing to challenges related to its reduced viewing share, the group invests 178 million kroons in order to keep the operations afloat. In September 2001, Rait Killandi, president of the Council of Administration, put the channel at a crossroads, demanding it either continue operating or closing it down. On 18 September, Polsat promised giving money to TV1, in order to pay its debts, with a speculated amount of up to 10 million kroons. Finally on 3 October, TV1 shut down as it was owing more than a million kroons. On 10 October, TV1 announced a return for 21 October that year, with a new attempt of doing experimental broadcasts, and with Oleg Sõnajalg at the helm again.

== Programming ==
At launch, TV1 had two main news editions, at 7pm in Estonian and at 9pm in Russian. The channel in this period broadcast from shortly after 4pm to midnight. The channel carried imported programming such as ER, Full House and a daily children's strand at 6pm. Content in the strand included a five-minute news bulletin for the target audience and the international computer introduction series PC4U. TV1 was the first channel in Estonia to air ER, which planned to make it one of its main series. It was initially built primarily on TV series, but within months from launch, it was ready to include feature films to its schedule. Before Ühispank left the control of the channel, it took over the rights to air Home and Away from ETV.
