= AS Starman =

Company based in Estonia

Coordinates: 59°25′50.19″N 24°44′54.97″E

Starman
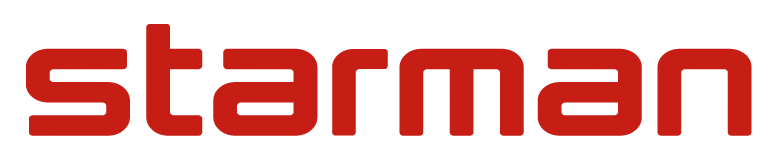
- Industry: Cable television Internet service provider IP Telephony
- Founded: 1992
- Founder: Indrek Kuivallik; Peeter Kern
- Defunct: 2018
- Headquarters: Tallinn, Estonia
- Parent: Elisa
- Website: {Internet archive redirect to starman.ee} https://web.archive.org/web/20150207001722/http://starman.ee/

Starman was an Estonian cable television and Internet service provider company founded in 1992 and located in Tallinn. Since December 2016, Starman Estonia is wholly owned by Elisa.

Starman was the largest cable television company in Estonia and in the Baltic countries.

== History ==
Starman was founded in 1992 by Peeter Kern and Indrek Kuivallik. Peeter Kern served as the company's CEO until his unexpected death in 2014.

In 2013, the Swedish investment company East Capital Explorer bought 51% of Starman's shares from the company's founders.

In 2015 Starman bought the Lithuanian telecommunications company Cgates, with funds from the majority shareholder East Capital Explorer, but the Lithuanian branch was again separated in a later acquisition.

In March 2016, East Capital Explorer intended to sell its 63% share to American investment firm Providence Equity Partners for €81 million, but Starman's minority shareholder Polaris Invest (owned by founder Indrek Kuivallik) used their pre-emptive rights to make the purchase instead. In December 2016, Starman Estonia was wholly acquired by Finnish telecommunications company Elisa for €151 million; this deal did not include the Lithuanian branch.
