= Global Estonian Cultural Days =

Estonian culture-related festival

Global Estonian Cultural Days (abbreviated ECD; Estonian: ülemaailmsed eesti kultuuripäevad, abbreviated ESTO) is Estonian culture-related events held, in general, in every four year.

First ECD were held in Toronto, Canada in 1972. In this time Estonia was not an independent country but a part of Soviet Union (Estonian SSR).

Before Estonian Restoration of Independence in 1991, ECD were important events to keep Estonian culture alive.

== Events ==
- I ECD (Toronto 1972)
- II ECD (Baltimore 1976)
- III ECD (Stockholm 1980)
- IV ECD (Toronto 1984)
- V ECD (Melbourne 1988)
- VI ECD (New York City 1992)
- VII ECD (Stockholm and Tallinn 1996)
- VIII ECD (Toronto 2000)
- IX ECD (Riga 2004)
- X ECD (Münster 2009)
- XI ECD (San Francisco 2013)
- XII ECD (Helsinki, Tartu and Tallinn 2019)
