= Anne Veesaar =

Estonian actress

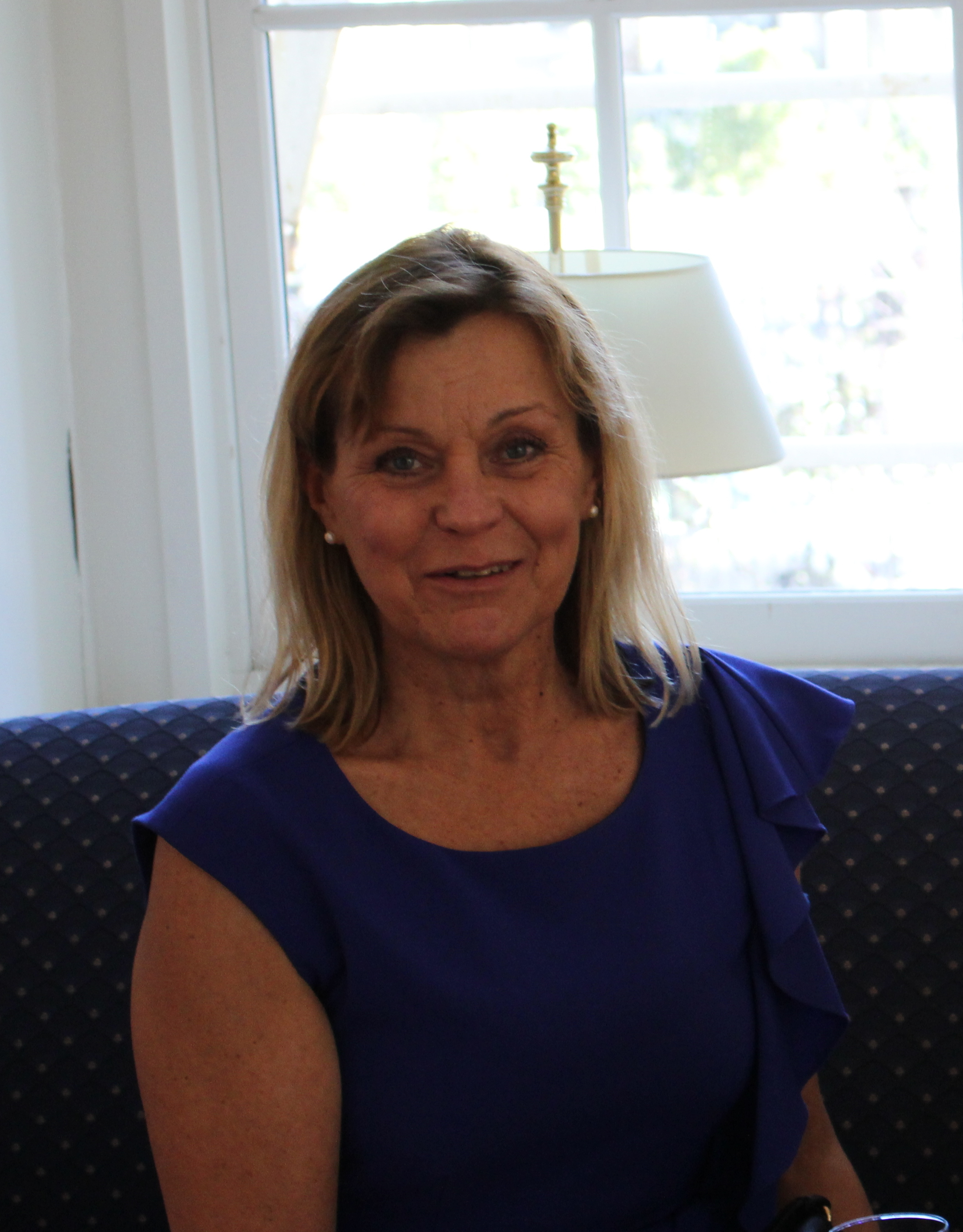
Anne Veesaar in 2014

Anne Veesaar (1985-1989 Pabut, 1992-2007 Elling; born 4 July 1957) is an Estonian actress.

Veesaar was born in Valga. In 1980 she graduated from Tallinn State Conservatory's performing arts department. From 1980 until 1989, she worked at the Rakvere Theatre, and from 1989 until 2004, at the Vanalinnastuudio in Tallinn. From 2002 until 2004, she was the head of Vanalinnastuudio. Later, she has been a freelance actress. Besides stage roles she has also participated on films and television series.

== Filmography ==
- 1976: Minu naine sai vanaemaks (television feature film; role: Helga)
- 1981: Keskpäev (television feature film)
- 1993 Kapsapea (animated film; role: Roosi)
- 1993: Väekargajad (Feature film; role: Hädi)
- 1993–present Õnne 13 (television series; role: Mare Peterson)
- 1997: Kapsapea 2 ehk Tagasi Euroopasse (animated film; role: Roosi)
- 2000: Saamueli Internet (animated film; role: Saamuel's wife)
- 2008: Tuulepealne maa (television miniseries)
