= Margus Tabor =

Estonian actor

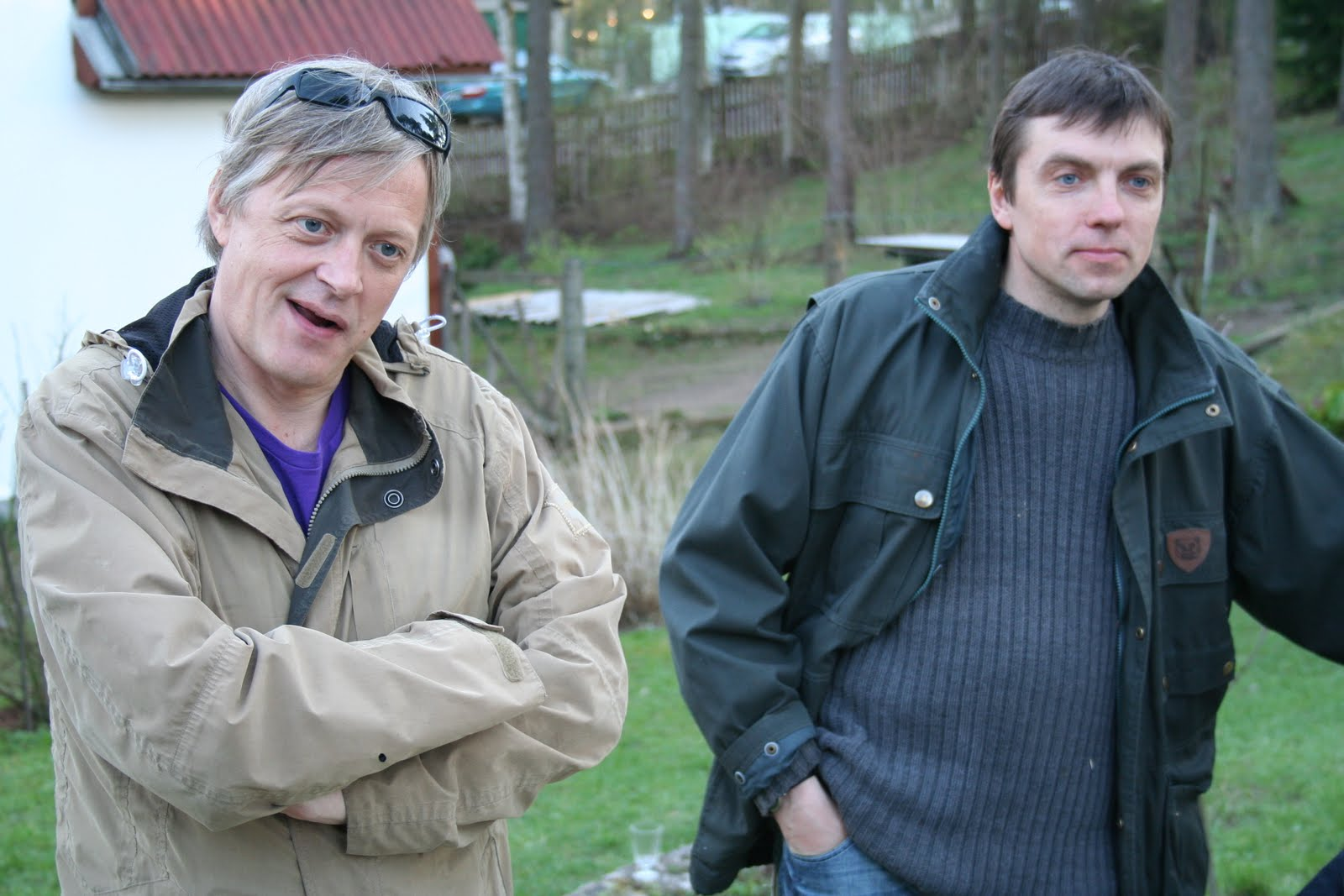
- Margus Tabor (on the left) and Jaanus Vaiksoo on the set of the children's show Saame kokku Tomi juures in 2011
- Born: 13 May 1962 (age 64); Suuremõisa, then part of Estonian SSR, Soviet Union
- Era: 1980s, 2010s

Margus Tabor (born 13 May 1962, in Suuremõisa) is an Estonian actor.

He is a member of the Estonian Theatre Union (since 1987) and the Estonian Actors' Union (since 1993).

Tabor has been married to actress Garmen Tabor since 1989.

== Selected roles ==
=== Selected film roles ===
- 1988: Õnnelik lapsepõlv
- 1989: Mardipäev
- 2010: Punane elavhõbe (feature film; role: 1st taxi driver)
- 2011: Lotte ja kuukivi saladus (animation film; role: Rännukoer Klaus (voice))
- 2012: Allveelennud (feature film; role: voices)
- 2018: Kapten Morten lollide laeval (animation film; role: Matilda/Tilda (voice))
- 2019: Lotte ja kadunud lohed (animation film; role: Harald (voice))
- 2019: Truth and Justice (feature film; role: Herman)
- 2020: The SpongeBob Movie: Sponge on the Run

== See also ==
1987 in Estonian television
