= TV 4 (Estonian TV channel) =

Estonian television channel

TV4
- Country: Estonia
- Broadcast area: Estonia
- Headquarters: Tallinn, Estonia

Ownership
- Owner: Toomas Lepp

History
- Launched: November 2007
- Closed: 30 November 2009
- Former names: Kalev Sport

TV4 is an Estonian sports channel, formerly owned Kalev Media and named Kalev Sport. Kalev Sport was launched in late 2007, offering viewers various sporting events, both domestic and international. TV4 was founded by Starman as a commercial-free channel in 2008. The two competing channels, Kanal 2 and TV3, saw it as a marketing strategy for Starman and, as consequence of that and its limited coverage, the potential audience was very low. It was renamed into TV4 and changed its owner after Kalev Media's bankruptcy. The new owner of the channel became Toomas Lepp. TV4 shows included English Premier League, motocross, Estonian club football, volleyball, and basketball. They also broadcast some Baltic Basketball league games. The channel closed at the end of March 2009 due to high losses.

== Sources ==
- Kalev Sport brings back Premier League
