= Ardo Ran Varres =

Estonian composer and actor (born 1974)

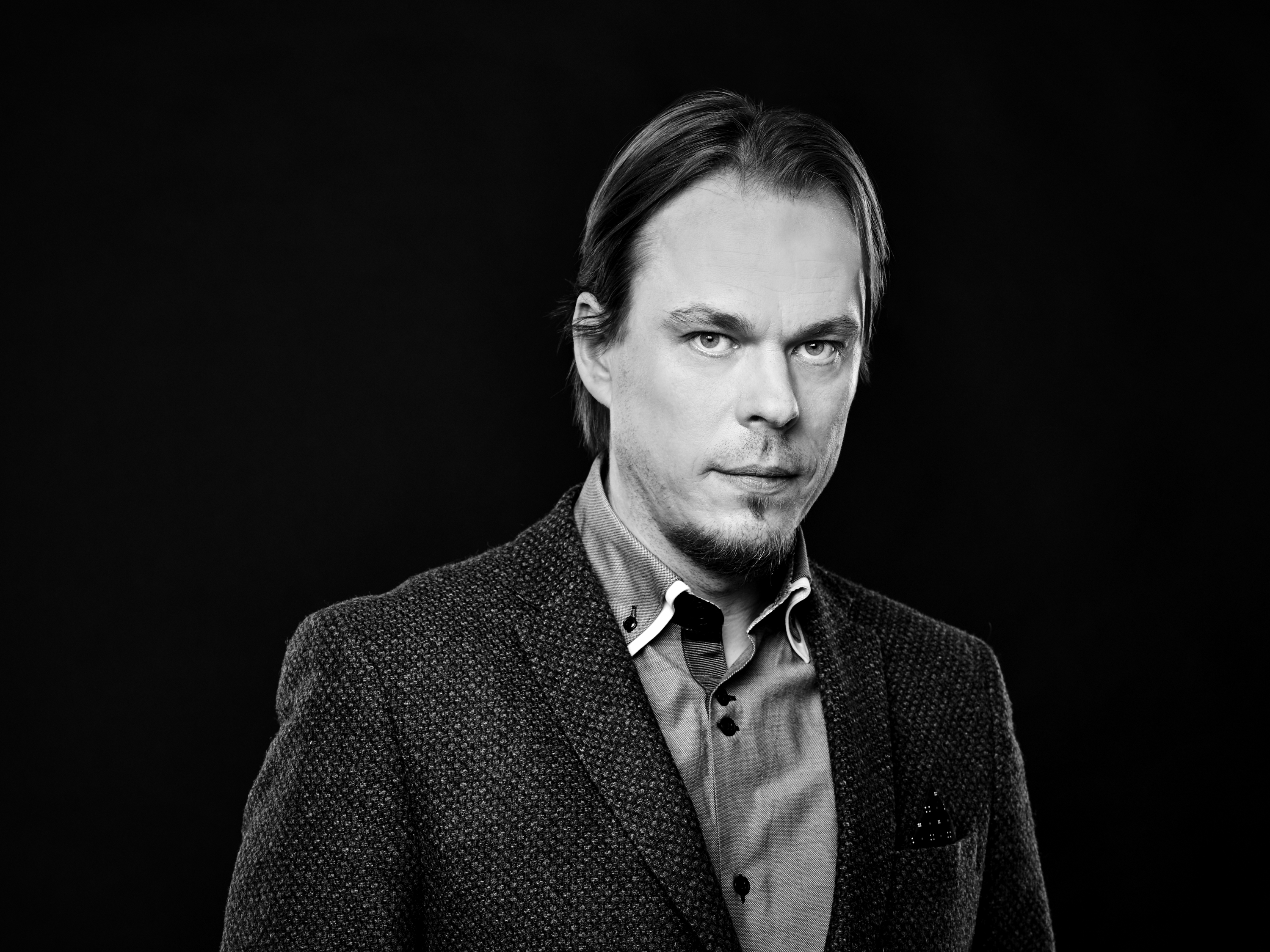
Ardo Ran Varres in 2015

Ardo Ran Varres (born 19 March 1974) is an Estonian composer and actor.

== Career ==
Ardo Ran Varres was born in Tallinn. He studied at the Tallinn Music High School from 1981–1992, graduated in clarinet performance, and at the Higher Theatre School of Estonian Academy of Music from 1992–1996, graduated as an actor. From 2009-2011 he studied composition in Helena Tulve's composition class at the Estonian Academy of Music and Theatre. Varres has played clarinet and saxophone at the Especially Sad Music Ensemble from 1991–1993. From 1996–2001 Varres was employed as an actor at the Rakvere Theatre and from 2001-2003 at the Estonian Drama Theatre, and was described as among "the leading younger [Estonian] actors and actresses of the last decade". From 2003-2011 he was the music director of the Estonian Drama Theatre. Since 2011 Varres has been a freelance artist. He was elected as member of the Estonian Composers Union in 2007.

Ardo Varres has worked with many stage directors at several theatres in Estonia and has played tens of roles (also in Finland, Denmark and Germany). He has written music for more than 50 productions, films, TV and radio productions, for both Estonian and foreign dramaturgy, world classics and modern plays. He writes also concert music.

In 2022 he premiered his first opera The New Old Nick of Hellsbottom. Theatre Vanemuine. Libretto by Kristi Klopets based on A. H. Tammsaare’s book. Musical Director & Conductor Risto Joost. Director Vilppu Kiljunen (Finland). Set Designer Iir Hermeliin

== Compositions ==
=== Concert music ===
- "The Year of Compassion" for flute, bassoon, theorbo, Tibetan singing bowl (2025) Dedicated to His Holiness the 14th Dalai Lama on His 90th Birthday
- "CHNOPS - Essential Life Elements" for the Ensemble Auftakt: clarinet, violin, piano (2024)
- "The Anonymous Whistleblower" for Piccolo and Live Electronics (2024)
- "13 Pieces For Two Pianos on Estonian Runic Melodies" for two pianos (2024)
- "The Spring" ("Allikas") for mixed choir (2023) Performed at the Estonian Song Festival "Iseoma" XXVIII
- "Uudissõnu/Unarsõnu" for the Ensemble Floridante: violin, harpsichord, viola da gamba (2023)
- "The "Ultimate" Truth" for string quartet (2022)
- Clarinet Concerto ”Between Two Blazes/Breezes” (2021)
- "13 Pieces for Two Pianos on Estonian Runic Melodies" (2021-2022)
- "The Great Painter" [Suur maalritöö] for mixed choir (2021)
- "Sun Circle" [Päikesering] (2020) Dedicated to the memory of composer's mother Taimi Varres (1933–2020)
- "Tragedy of the Commons" [Ühisvaratragöödia] for wind orchestra (2019)
- "Die Luftballonmusik", violin, phonogram (2017)
- "Apis Mellifera" (Honey Bee) (Estonian Music Days Festival, 2017)
- "One Dream Has Remained in My Song", mixed choir (2017)
- "Hums of Tallinn" electronics (2016)
- Grus Grus, MIDI saxophone, phonogram (2015)
- Ouverture "Citizens of the Republic", symphony orchestra (2015)
- "Concentra", string orchestra (2014)
- "Awakening bell", concerto for bass clarinet (Glasperlenspiel Festival, 2014)
- “The Field of Now”, chamber ensemble, live-electronics (2013)
- “Mantra”, mixed choir (2013)
- “Valge hobuse mägi” (White Horse Mountain), two clarinets (2013)
- “Carrmen!”, dance performance (2012)
- “Force majeure”, cello, phonogram (2012)
- “Jäälätted” (Ice Springs), bass clarinet, harp, tablas, citar (2012)
- “Das Ende Beginnt” (Beginning of the End), chamber ensemble, live-electronics (2011)
- “Angulated”, symphony orchestra (2011)
- “Fever”, piano, violin (2011)
- “Vastsest templist” (Of a New Temple), cantata for chamber orchestra (Jubileum of the Estonian Drama Theatre, 2010)
- “Kevade”, ballet (2009)
- “Tallinna Puhastustuli” (Purgatorium of Tallinn), rock-oratorio (2009)
- “Ärevad päevad. 1918” (The Hectic Days), chamber ensemble (2008)
- “Berlin Hauptbahnhof” (Berlin Central Station), cello, phonogram, live-electronics (2008)
- “Arabella ja Taaniel”, musical for children (2002)

=== Film music ===
Music for documentary and feature films, including:

- "Bad Ass Merike", documentary, Directed by Andres Keil (2024)
- "Vari" (Shadow), feature film, Directed by Jaak Kilmi, Taska Film (2024)
- "Yummy", animation, Directed by Martinus Daane Klemet, AAA Creative (2024)
- "Gori The Caricaturist", documentary, Directed by Raimo Jõerand and Meelis Arulepp, Filmivabrik (2023)
- "Kuulsusenarrid" feature film, Directed by Ain Mäeots, Taska Film, Apollo Film Productions (2023)
- "Nightingale" short feature film, Directed by Leeni Linna, Allfilm (2023)
- "Fragments of Humanity", documentary, Directed by Elli Rintala, Kinocompany, Finland (2021)
- "Year of the Pig" ("Sea aasta"), documentary, Directed by Raimo Jõerand, Filmivabrik (2020)
- "The Real life of Johannes Pääsuke", feature film, Directed by Hardi Volmer, Kopli kinokompanii (2018)
- "Rodeo", documentary, 2017
- "Päike on hea laps" (The Sun is a good kid), documentary, 2014
- "Elavad pildid” (Living Images), feature film, 2012
- "Üks mu sõber" (A Friend of Mine), feature film, 2011
- "Disko ja tuumasõda" (Disco and the nuclear war), documentary, 2009
- "Sinimäed" (The Blue Hills), documentary, 2006
- "Herr Tartüff", 1925 silent film (2005)
- “Karujaht Pärnumaal” (Bear hunting in Pärnu county) 1914 silent film (2008)
- "Tuulepealne maa" (The Windward Land), television series, 2008
- "Kättemaksukontor" (Revenge office), television series, 2009
- "Härrad Abikaasad" (Mister husbands), television series, 1999, 2007
- "Ohtlik Lend" (Dangerous flight), television series, 2007
- “Stella stellaris”, television drama, 2000
- “Ma armastasin sakslast” (I was in love with a German), television drama, 1998

=== Stage music ===
Music for more than 60 theatre stagings, including:

- "Alice In Wonderland", E Studio Choir and Dance School, 2024
- "Prince and the Pauper", Ugala Theatre, 2023
- "The Brothers Lionheart", Theatre Vanemuine, 2022
- "The Boy and the Butterfly" Author: Anton Hansen Tammsaare, Noorsooteater, 2021
- "Taken at Midnight"Mark Hayhurst's play, Tallinn City Theatre, (2020)
- "DreamWorks", Theatre Endla, 2018
- "Faust", Theatre Vanemuine, 2018
- "Pollyanna", NUKU Theatre, 2017
- "Mister Green", VAT Theatre, 2017
- "Night Queen", Karlova Theatre, 2017
- "It's Not Time For Making Love", theatre R.A.A.A.M., 2017
- "Beatrice", Theatre Vanemuine, 2017
- "The Linden Tree", Theatre Vanemuine, 2016
- "Katarina's Bridal Veil. Way of the Cross and Stone", Emajõe Summer Theatre, 2016
- "The Star-Child", Karlova Theatre, 2016
- Sandra Jõrgeva's exhibition "Question of Faith" (Voronja Gallery, 2016)
- "They Went and Planted the Seeds of Shadows Because the Light Started to Sprout" (Estonian Music Days, 2016)
- "The Forest of Light", Tartu Observatory (2015)
- "Alustame algusest" (Let's start from the beginning), R.A.A.A.M, Free Stage, 2014
- "Estoplast" (Vanemuine Theatre, 2014)
- "Krabat" (Tallinn City Theatre, 2014)
- “Prohvet Maltsvet” (Maltsvet the prophet), 2013
- "Carrrmen!" (Vanemuine Theatre, 2012)
- “Varastatud oranž jalgratas” (A stolen orange bicycle) Estonian Drama Theatre, 2010
- “Lõputu kohvijoomine” (Endless coffee drinking), Estonian Drama Theatre, 2008
- “Voldemar” (Estonian Drama Theatre, 2007)
- "Tõestus" (The proof), Tallinn City Theatre, 2002
- "Õhtusöök sõpradega" (Dinner with friends), Estonian Drama Theatre, 2001

=== Music for TV broadcasts and series ===
- "The Forest Brothers" Directed by Erle Veber, 2021
- "Moment in History", Estonian Public Broadcasting, 2017
- "Black Widows", Paprika Latino Studios, 2015
- "Revenge Service Office", BEC, 2009

=== Discography ===
- CD "13 Pieces For Two Pianos on Estonian Runic Melodies", Tonoscope Records, 2024
- CD New Estonian Chamber Music, Estonian Music Information Centre, 2021
- CD New Estonian Chamber Music, Estonian Music Information Centre, 2017
- CD/DVD "They Went and Planted the Seeds of Shadows Because the Light Started to Sprout", 2016
- CD "Siin Tallinn / Raadio Maria", Raadio Maria (2007)
- CD "Õhtusöök sõpradega : muusika Eesti Draamateatri lavastustele = Dinner with friends : music for productions of Estonian Drama Theatre / Ardo Ran Varres", Estonian Drama Theatre (2007)
- CD "Arabella ja Taaniel : teater muusikas / Ardo R. Varres", Rakvere Teater (2003)
- CD "MacBeth : Rakvere Teater esitab / Ardo Ran Varres", Rakvere Teater (2000)
