= Toomas Urb =

Estonian actor and singer (born 1958)

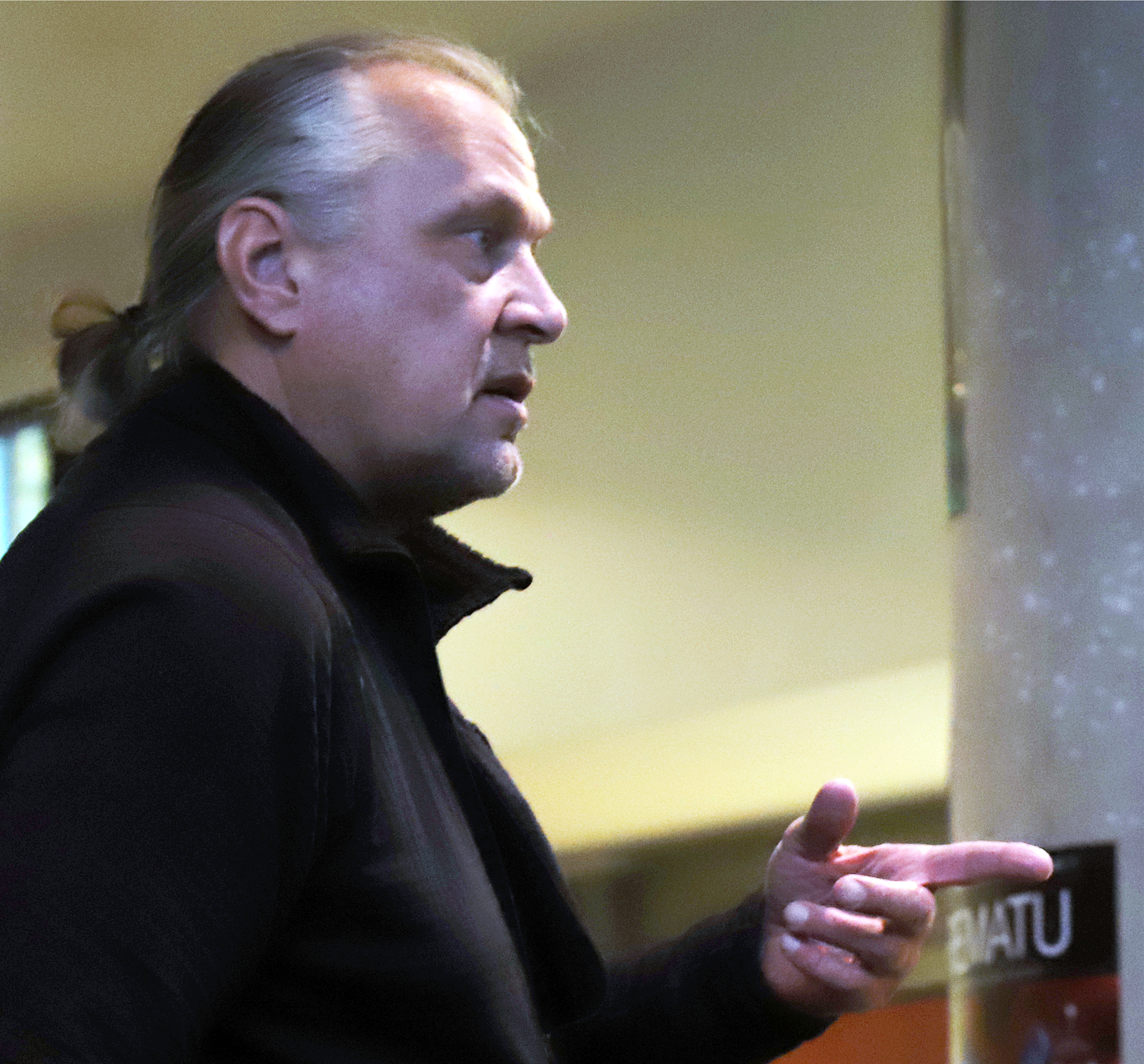
- Born: 2 December 1958 (age 67); Tartu, then part of Estonian SSR, Soviet Union
- Education: Estonian Academy of Music and Theatre
- Spouse: Viire Valdma (m. 1982; div. 1987)

Toomas Urb (born 2 December 1958) is an Estonian actor and singer.

== Career ==
In 1984, he graduated from Tallinn State Conservatory Stage Art Department. From 1984 to 1987, he was an actor an Estonian Drama Theatre. Since 1989, he has lived in the United States. Besides theatre roles, he has played also in several films.

From 1978 to 1980, he was a member of Estonian sailing team.

He has recorded music with his brother Tarmo Urb.

He is a member of Screen Actor's Guild.

== Personal life ==
Toomas Urb's older brother is actor and singer Tarmo Urb. His nephew is actor and model Johann Urb. He was married to actress Viire Valdma from 1982 until their divorce in 1987. They have two children: a son, singer and musician Tom-Olaf Urb and a daughter, Maria Urb.

== Filmography ==
- 1986: Saja aasta pärast mais
- 1984: Hundiseaduse aegu
- 1983: Suletud ring
- 2005: Stiilipidu
