= Õnne 13 =

Estonian TV drama first aired 1993

- Written by: Astrid Reinla (1993–1994); Kati Murutar (1995–1996); Teet Kallas (1996–2011); Urmas Lennuk (2011); Teet Kallas (2011–2012); Urmas Lennuk (2013–2014); Andra Teede (2014–)
- Directed by: Tõnis Kask (1993–2003); Ain Prosa (2003–)
- Starring: Kaljo Kiisk; Helgi Sallo; Luule Komissarov; Raivo E. Tamm
- Theme music composer: Alo Mattiisen; Ardo Ran Varres
- Country of origin: Estonia
- Original language: Estonian
- No. of seasons: 31
- No. of episodes: 894

Production
- Producer: Raivo Suviste
- Running time: 30 minutes

Original release
- Network: ETV
- Release: 1993

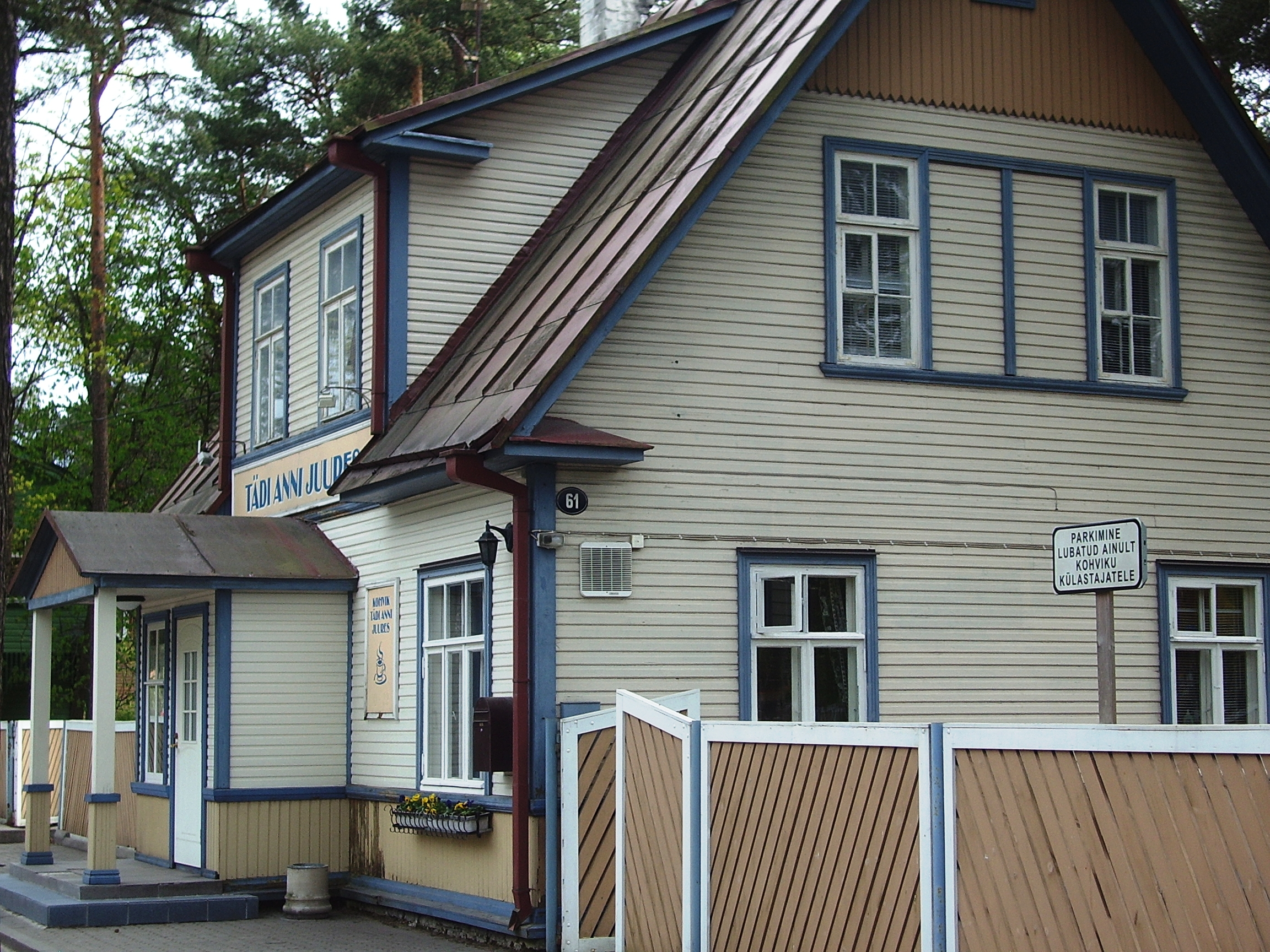
Cafe "Tädi Anni Juures" in Nõmme, Tallinn is one of the shooting locations.

Õnne 13 is an Estonian dramatic TV series that airs on ETV. The series first aired on 30 October 1993 and was written by Astrid Reinla and as of 1996 by Teet Kallas. Since 1997, the series is produced by BEC (Balti Video OÜ), which has also produced Pehmed ja Karvased, Kodu keset linna, and Ohtlik lend.

The series takes place in the fictional town of Morna and features an ensemble cast.

== Cast ==
| Character | Played by |
|---|---|
| Alma Saarepera | Helgi Sallo |
| Allan Peterson | Raivo E. Tamm |
| Mare Peterson | Anne Veesaar |
| Laine Rosenkampf-Jägerfreund | Luule Komissarov |
| Kristan Rosenkampf-Jägerfreund | Väino Aren |
| Jaanus Peterson | Ott Aardam |
| Jane Peterson | Maarja Jakobson |

== Viewership ==
| Date | Pos.^{1} | Viewers | %^{2} |
|---|---|---|---|
| June 2017 | 2 | 320,123 | 21.9 |
| April 2009 | 1 | 240,000 | 18.7 |
| January 2009 | 2 | 248,000 | 22.5 |
| October 2008 | 3 | 231,000 | 17.9 |
| May 2008 | 10 | 161,000 | 12.5 |
| November 2007 | 4 | 223,000 | 17.3 |
| April 2006 | 2 | 219,000 | 16.9 |
| January 2006 | 4 | 232,000 | 17.7 |
| October 2005 | 2 | 217,000 | 16.6 |
| April 2008 | 2 | 232,000 | 17.8 |
| October 2004 | 3 | 247,000 | 18.1 |
| March 2003 | 4 | 273,000 | |
| December 2002 | 22 | 210,000 | 18.8 |
| November 2001 | 7 | 226,000 | 19.3 |
| February 2001 | 6 | 272,000 | 23.3 |

^{1} Position in Estonia's viewership.
^{2} Percentage of total Estonian viewership watching.

From TNS Emor's Estonian TV polling.
