= Television in Estonia =

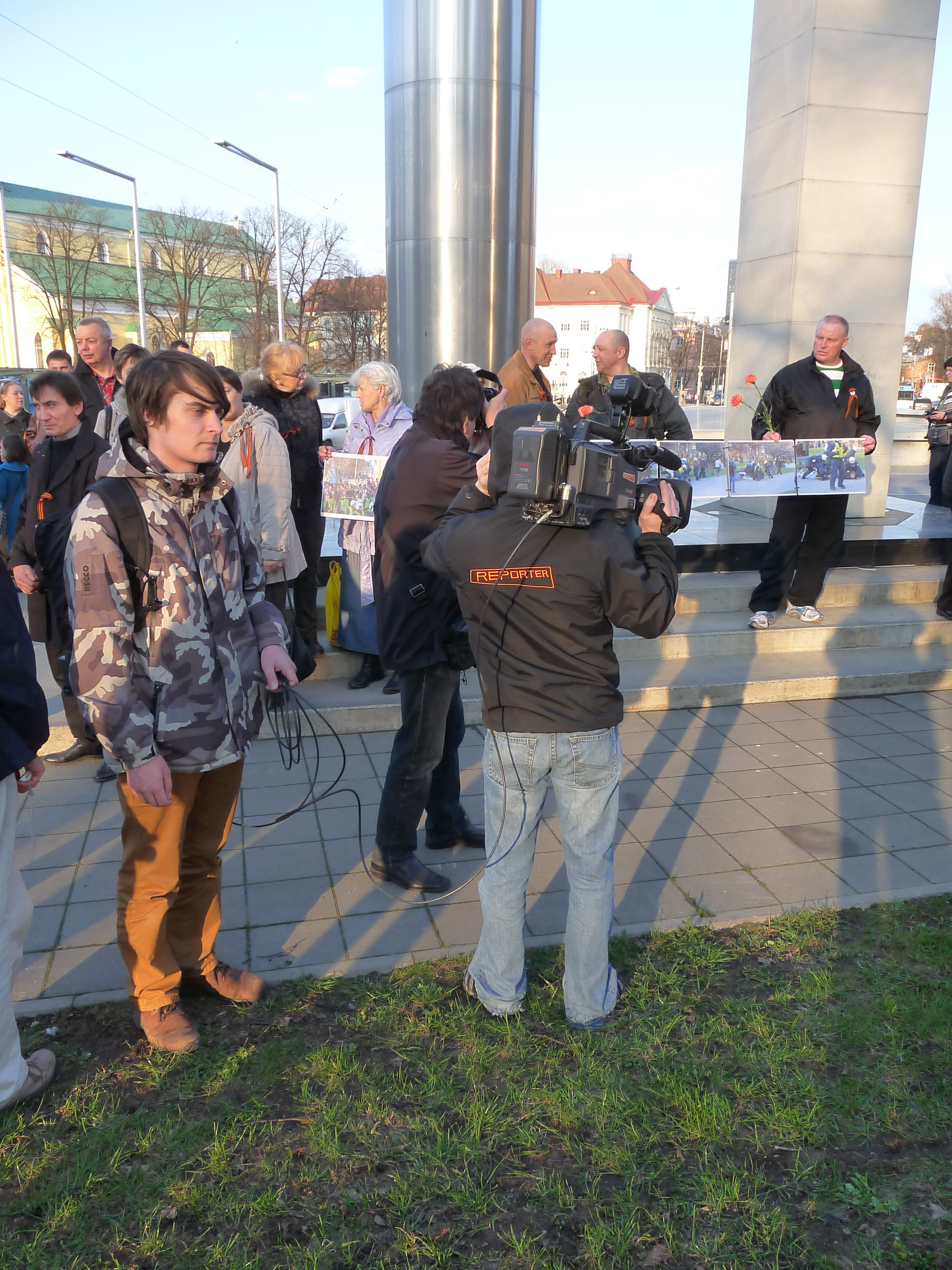
Bronze Night commemoration 2012, Tallinn

Television in Estonia was introduced in 1955, following the Soviet government's decision to establish a television station in 1953. The National television channel Eesti Televisioon (ETV) has maintained an archive since 1955 in which broadcasts of unique aspects of Estonian culture are held.

Northern Estonia received television signals from Finland. During the 1970s and 1980s, Finnish broadcasts were more popular than Soviet-Estonian offerings until the Singing Revolution, with many Estonians enjoying Dallas and other programs portraying non-Communist lifestyles.

Digital television was officially launched on December 15, 2006, when the operator Eesti Digitaaltelevisiooni AS launched its pay service Zuum TV, operated by Starman, on two multiplexes. In 2006, only ETV was available for free, but as of March 2009, there are already 7 free channels in digital broadcast. Digital television signal (DVB-T and DVB-H) is broadcast by Levira. DVB-C is provided by cable operators Starman, STV, Telset, telecommunications company Elion (also offering IPTV). Analog transmitters were turned off in July 2010.

== See also ==
- List of television channels in Estonia
- List of years in Estonian television
