= Timeline of Estonian history =

This is a timeline of Estonian history, comprising important legal and territorial changes and political events in Estonia and its predecessor states. To read about the background to these events, see History of Estonia. See also the list of rulers of Estonia.

== BC (Before Common-era) ==
Year	Date	Event
3,000 BC		Finno-Ugric peoples (ancestors of Estonians) started to move from eastern Europe to northeastern coast of Baltic Sea.

== 1st century ==
Year	Date	Event
98		Roman historian Tacitus writes in the book Germania about aesti tribes.

== 6th century ==
Year	Date	Event
600		Vikings from Gotland sail to Hiiumaa (Dagö) island and build a fortification there.
600		King Ingvar of Sweden invades Estonia, but is killed. His son Anund avenges his father and raids the country.

== 8th century ==
Year	Date	Event
800		Estonians participate in the Battle of Brávellir on the side of the Swedes and against the Danes.

== 10th century ==
Year	Date	Event
967		Olaf Tryggvason, the future King of Norway, is captured by Estonian vikings, and sold as a slave.
972		A battle between Estonian and Icelandic Vikings in Saaremaa.

== 11th century ==
Year	Date	Event
1008		Olaf Haraldsson, the future King of Norway, wins a battle in Saaremaa.
1030		Prince Yaroslav the Wise of Kiev defeats Chuds and founds a fort named Yuryev (modern Tartu).
1050		Estonians started trading and raiding Viking expeditions over Baltic Sea to Sweden.
1061		Sosols (Estonian tribe) destroy the Yuryev castle and attack Pskov.

== 12th century ==
Year	Date	Event
1113		Prince Mstislav I of Kiev wins a battle against the Chuds (Estonians or people related to Estonians).
1116		Prince Mstislav of Kiev, aided by Pskov and Novgorod, makes a raid against the Chuds and conquers the Otepää stronghold.
1132		Prince Vsevolod of Novgorod is defeated by Estonians of Vaiga county.
1134		Prince Vsevold of Novgorod fights against the Chuds and briefly captures the fortification of Tartu (Yuryev).
1154		Arab geographer Al Idrisi mentions Estonian places, also marking the foundation of Tallinn.
1165		The Benedictine bishop Fulco is named Bishop of the Estonians by the Archbishop of Lund.
1170		Valdemar I of Denmark fights with Curonian and Estonian pirates near Öland island.
1171 (or 1169–1170)		Bishop Fulco makes a missionary journey to Estonia.
1177		Fulco second missionary journey to Estonia.
1177		Estonians attack and burn Pskov during winter.
1187		Estonians, Karelians or/and Karelians ravage the Mälaren area in Sweden, pillage town of Sigtuna, and kill the archbishop Johannes.
1191		Cistercian monk Theoderich, future Bishop of Estonia, makes an unsuccessful missionary journey to Estonia.
1192		Prince Yaroslav Vladimirovich of Novgorod makes two raids against Estonians, burning down the Tartu and Otepää strongholds.
1193		Pope Celestine III calls for a crusade against pagans in Northern Europe.
1200		Bishop Albert and his crusaders capture Riga in Latvia.

== 13th century ==
Year	Date	Event
1202		Pope Innocent III declares Crusade to Christianize Old Livonia. The crusader Livonian Brothers of the Sword are founded.
1203		Saaremaa islanders ravage areas of Southern Sweden, then belonging to Denmark. The returning pirates skirmish with the German settlers of Riga near the town of Visby in Gotland.
1206		Valdemar II of Denmark builds a fortress in Saaremaa, but burns it down after finding no volunteers to man it.
1207		The Terra Mariana ("Land of St Mary) is established as the political unit of crusaders in Livonia.
1208		Sword Brothers, Letts and Livs invade Sakala and Ugandi in Southern Estonia, starting the Estonian Ancient Fight for Freedom (1208-1227).
1209		Sword Brothers and Letts attack Ugandi.
1210		Estonians besiege the Cēsis stronghold in Latvia.
1210		Estonians defeat the Sword Brothers and Livs in the Battle of Ümera in Latvia.
1210		Pskov and Novgorod troops besiege the Otepää stronghold.
1210-1211		First recorded plague in Estonia.
1211		Pskov troops raid Western Estonia.
1211	Summer	Estonians are defeated by Sword Brothers in the Battle of Turaida in Latvia.
1211		Sword Brothers are defeated by Estonians in the Battle of Viljandi.
1211		Estonians raid crusader areas in Latvia.
1211		Three-year truce between Estonians and Germans is signed at Turaida.
1212		Russian troops besiege the Varbola Stronghold.
1212		Troops from Sakala, led by Lembitu of Lehola, burn Pskov.
1213		Lithuanians raid the Sakala area.
1215		Sword Brothers defeat Estonians in the Battle of Lehola.
1215		Troops from Saaremaa besiege Riga.
1215		Troops from Sakala raid crusader areas in Latvia.
1216		Pskov troops capture the Otepää stronghold.
1217	February	Sword Brothers are defeated by Estonians and Russians in the Battle of Otepää.
1217	21 September	Sword Brothers, Latgalians and Livs defeat Estonians in the Battle of St. Matthew's Day, where the Estonian leader Lembitu of Lehola is killed.
1219	15 June	Valdemar II of Denmark conquers Tallinn in the Battle of Lindanise and builds the Toompea Castle.
1220	8 August	John I of Sweden invades Läänemaa, but is defeated by troops from Saaremaa in the Battle of Lihula.
1221		Estonians besiege Tallinn.
1222		The invading Danish troops are defeated by Estonians in Saaremaa.
1223	29 January	Estonians defeat the Sword Brothers in the Battle of Viljandi and the entire Southern Estonia is liberated.
1223		Estonians are defeated by Sword Brothers in Ümera, Latvia.
1223		Pskov and Novgorod troops raid most of mainland Estonia.
1224	15 August	Sword Brothers capture the Tartu stronghold from joint Estonian and Russian troops - mainland Estonia falls to the crusaders.
1224		The Bishopric of Dorpat is established in Southeastern Estonia.
1227	January	Sword Brothers conquer stronghold of Muhu, and last pagan stronghold of Valjala surrenders.
1227		Sword Brothers conquer Northern Estonia from Denmark.
1228	1 October	The Bishopric of Ösel–Wiek is established in Western Estonia.
1234		Pskov and Novgorod troops invade the Bishopric of Dorpat, that is forced to pay tribute for four years.
1234		De Lode brothers in Kullamaa Parish refuse to recognize the new Bishop of Ösel-Wiek.
1236	22 September	Sword Brothers are defeated by Samogitians in the Battle of Saule. Saaremaa islanders rebel against German rule.
1237		Livonian Brothers of the Sword merge into the Teutonic Order and become known as the Livonian Order, autonomous of the Teutonic Order State.
1238		The Livonian Order helps restore the power of the Bishop of Ösel Wiek in Kullamaa Parish.
1239		The Liber Census Daniae is compiled. The book also gives first recorded data on northern Estonia.
1242	5 April	The Livonian Order and Estonians are defeated by Novgorod in the Battle of the Ice.
1249		St. Michael's Convent is founded in Tallinn.
1251		first mentioning of a school in Estonia (the cathedral school in Pärnu).
1268	18 February	Pskov and Novgorod defeat the Livonian Order in the Battle of Rakvere, ending the Order's attempts to invade Russia.
1270	16 February	Lithuanians defeat the Livonian Order in the Battle of Karuse.
1285		Tallinn becomes a member of the Hanseatic League.
1298		A border war between the Livonian Order and the Bishopric of Ösel-Wiek.

== 14th century ==
Year	Date	Event
1305		Padise Abbey is founded.
1343		St.George's Night Uprising (1343–1345) in Northwestern Estonia and Saaremaa.
1346		King Valdemar IV of Denmark sells Northern Estonia to the Teutonic Order.
1347		The Teutonic Order gives Northern Estonia to Livonian Order.

== 15th century ==
Year	Date	Event
1407		Pirita convent is built.
1419		The Livonian Diet is formed to solve internal disputes in Livonia.
1433		First recorded great fire in Tallinn.
1435		The Livonian Confederation is established to solve internal disputes in Livonia.
1440		The Livonian Order becomes self-governing from the Teutonic Order.
1464		Plague kills 2/3 of population of Tallinn.
1480-1481		First war between Old Livonia and Muscovite Russia.
1500		Estonian population exceeds 250,000.

== 16th century ==
Year	Date	Event
1500-1502		Second Livonian-Russian war.
1504-1505		Plague ravages Estonia.
1507		Old Livonian peasants are not allowed to own weapons.
1523		The Reformation comes to Estonia.
1524	14 September	Catholic churches are pillaged in Tallinn.
1525		The Teutonic Order is secularized and the Livonian Order becomes de facto independent.
1552		First library is founded in Tallinn.
1558		Russian forces invade Eastern Estonia, starting the Livonian War.
1558		The Bishopric of Dorpat and several bailiwicks of the Livonian Order in Eastern Estonia surrender to Russian forces.
1558		Tartu surrendered to Russian troops in the Livonian War
1559		The Bishop of Ösel-Wiek sells his bishopric to King Frederick II of Denmark, who gives the land to his brother Duke Magnus of Holstein. Lutheranism prevails in Western Estonia.
1560		Duke Magnus of Holstein takes power in the Bishopric of Ösel-Wiek.
1560		Russian troops defeat the Livonian Order in the Battle of Härgmäe.
1560		Russian troops capture Central Estonia from the Livonian Order.
1560		Ivan the Terrible decimated the Livonian Order in the Battle of Ergeme.
1560		Uprising of Wiek's peasants. (:et)
1561		The Commandery of Tallinn and the nobility of other North Estonian bailiwicks of the Livonian Order swear allegiance to Sweden.
1561		The Treaty of Vilnius gives lands of the Livonian Order in Southern Estonia and Northern Latvia to the Grand Duchy of Lithuania as the Duchy of Livonia.
1561	6 June	The city council of Reval surrendered to Sweden.
1562		The Livonian Order is dissolved.
1562		The Bailiwick of Maasilinna of the former Livonian Order in Saaremaa and Hiiumaa refuses to recognize Lithuanian power.
1564		The Bailiwick of Maasilinna gives itself under Danish rule.
1573	1 January	The Russians occupied Pärnu (Pernau) in Western Estonia and the fortress of Weissenstein (Paide).
1578		Balthasar Russow publishes his cronicles about the Livonian War.
1581	6 September	A mercenary army of Sweden under Pontus de la Gardie captured Narva from Russia.
1582		By the armistice of Jam Zapolski, Dorpat together with Southern Estonia was incorporated into the state of Poland-Lithuania.
1595		Treaty of Teusina: Sweden's right to Narva and Estonia was signed.

== 17th century ==
Year	Date	Event
1625		Swedish commander Jacob De la Gardie took Dorpat (Tartu) and Southern Estonia from Poland
1628		First glass manufacturer is established in Estonia on Hiiumaa (operates until 1664).
1629		Truce of Altmark: Sweden acquired the territory of Livonia.
1630		First gymnasium is established in Estonia in Tartu.
1630		Gustav Adolf Gymnasium is established in Tallinn (being the oldest continuously operating secondary school in Estonia).
1630		First printer is established in Estonia in Tallinn.
1632		Foundation of the University of Tartu under Swedish king Gustavus Adolphus.
1645	13 August	Saaremaa (Ösel) island was ceded from Denmark to Sweden by the Treaty of Brömsebro.
1684		Forselius Seminar for schoolmasters is opened near Tartu (operated until 1688).
1687		Over the Estonia, widespread opening of village schools for peasants, starts.
1690		Tartu University is re-opened, but 1699–1710 operates in Pärnu.
1695-1697		Great Famine of Estonia.
1700	20 November	Battle at Narva, where the Swedish army under King Charles XII defeats the Russian army.

== 18th century ==
Year	Date	Event
1704		Russian troops under czar Peter the Great captured Dorpat (Tartu) in the Great Northern War.
1708		Fearful of Swedish attack, Russians burned down the city of Tartu.
1710		Whole Estonia was included in Russian empire.
1710-1713		Last great plague in Estonia. About 200,000 people dies (about half of population).
1718		Construction of Kadriorg Palace begins.
1721	30 August	Estonia was formally ceded by Sweden to Russia by the Treaty of Nystad.
1730		Herrnhut sects arrives in Estonia. Amongst the other things, they propagate reading among peasants.
1782		The customs border between Russia and Baltic governorates is abolished.
1792		First mirrors producing factory is opened in Estonia.

== 19th century ==
Year	Date	Event
1802		Tartu University is re-opened (was closed until 1710).
1816		Serfdom was abolished in Estonia (Estonian Governorate).
1819		Serfdom was abolished in Livonia (Livonian Governorate).
1823		Johann August Hagen forms the first choir of native Estonians in Tallinn.
1834		agricultural institute is opened in Vana-Kuuste (operated until 1838).
1838		Estonian Learned Society is founded.
1839		Cimze seminary for schoolmasters is opened in Valmiera.
1843		Eduard Ahrens publishes his Estonian grammar book. The book is a base of for written Estonian language.
1849		New peasant farm law is proclaimed in Livonian Governorate. This allows peasants to purchase their tenant farms as freeholds.
1850		Narva Linen Mill (predecessor of Kreenholm Manufacturing Company) is founded.
1853		Estonian Naturalists' Society is established.
1854		Peasant farm law (1849) is also extended to Estonian Governorate.
1855		The first Estonian permanent newspaper Perno Postimees is founded.
1855		Kreenholm Manufacturing Company is founded.
1858		peasant revolt: Mahtra War.
1861		"Kalevipoeg", Estonia's national epic, was published in both Estonian and German.
1861		Prophet Maltsvet followers migrate to Crimea, in hope to find the promised land.
1863		Preparatory works to establish the first Estonian-language secondary school (Estonian Aleksander School) begin. (school opened in 1888).
1864	21 November	On Johann Köler's initiative, the a major Estonian peasants' petition (Estonian: 1864. aasta palvekirjaaktsioon) is presented to the imperator.
1865		Vanemuine Cultural Society is founded in Tartu.
1865		Estonia is founded in Tallinn.
1866		The Law of Local Self-Government (Estonian: vallaseadus) comes into force. Noble estate owners' rights over peasants are severely reduced.
1867-1870		Three influential patriotic speeches by Carl Robert Jakobson.
1869		Estonian Song Festivals established.
1870		First Estonian-language play Saaremaa onupoeg by Lydia Koidula is published.
1870	5 November	First railroad is opened in Estonia. The railroad connects Paldiski, Tallinn, Narva and St. Petersburg.
1870-1871		First agricultural societies are founded in Tartu, Pärnu and Viljandi.
1872		Society of Estonian Literati is founded.
1875		Cultural society Endla is founded in Pärnu.
1876		Rail traffic between Tartu and Tapa is opened.
1880		Eduard Bornhöhe short story Tasuja ('The Avenger') is published. Due to the book, patriotic fervor remarkably intensifies.
1880	11–13 June	Third Estonian Song Festival, first time in Tallinn.
1884	4 June	Blue-black-white tricolor (later the flag of Estonia) of the Estonian Students' Society is blessed at Otepää Church.
1886		Russian language is decreed to be official language of communication in urban and rural administrations in Estonia.
1887		Russian language is decreed to be official language of instruction in all public schools since grade three.
1888		Jakob Hurt initiates the collection of national folkloric poetry.
1888		Estonian Aleksander School is opened.
1888	10 August	The first horse-drawn tram route is opened in Tallinn .
1889		Policy of Russification introduced where Baltic German legal and educational institutions are abolished or transformed into Russian.
1889		First temperance society is founded in Tori.
1893		First hydroelectric power plant is opened in Kunda.
1896		First cinematic presentations in Tallinna and Tartu.
1896		First automobile is arrived in Estonia.
1896		First narrow-gauge railroad is opened. It connects Pärnu and Valga.
1900		First Estonian symphony orchestra is formed in Tartu.
1900		Volta electric motor factory is established.
1900–1903		Economic crisis.

== 20th century ==
Year	Date	Event
1901		Konstantin Päts founds the newspaper Teataja in Tallinn.
1902		First commercial bank in Estonia is established in Tartu.
1903		Ants Laikmaa founds the first arts academy in Estonia.
1904		Noor-Eesti is established.
1904		Keila-Haapsalu rail line is opened.
1904		Local elections in Tallinn. Estonian-Russian joint group (led by Konstantin Päts) takes power from Baltic Germans group in city council.
1905	November	Russian Revolution of 1905 swept through Estonia. Estonian nationalist feeling is widespread, and autonomy from Russia is demanded.
1906		The first fully Estonian-language school (Estonian: Eesti Noorsoo Kasvatuse Seltsi tütarlastegümnaasium, nowadays Miina Härma Gymnasium) is opened in Tartu.
1907		First small-scale electric plant starts operating in Pärnu. Plant provides electric power to nearby households.
1908		First radio transmission station in Estonia is opened. It is located at the Russian Imperial Baltic Fleet's Tallinn port.
1908		Mihhail Rostovtsev opens Tartu Private University. University operates until 1918.
1909	14 April	Estonian National Museum is opened in Tartu.
1912	27 April	First airplane lands in Estonia.
1913	24 August	Estonia Theatre and Concert Halls building is opened.
1914	1 August	Russian Empire enters WW I.
1915	20 August	Retreating Russian forces burn the Waldhof pulp mill. Then the largest pulp mill in Europe.
1915	15 November	Steam trams begin operating in Tallinn.
1917	30 March	Russian Provisional Government granted Estonia its autonomy.
1917	8 April	40,000 Estonians are demonstrating in Petrograd. Their main slogan is that divided Estonia (two governorates) should be merged to Province of Estonia.
1918	24 February	Estonian Declaration of Independence
1918	3 March	Treaty of Brest-Litovsk. Bolshevist Russia cedes sovereignty over Estonia to Germany.
1918	11 November	Germans begin withdrawal and turn over power to the provisional government of Estonia (headed by Konstantin Päts).
1918	22 November	Estonia is invaded by Bolshevist Russian forces. Beginning of Estonian War of Independence.
1919		Bolsheviks are driven out of Estonia.
1919	10 October	Agrarian Law passed redistributing many of the estates owned by Baltic Germans and Estonian landowners.
1920	2 February	Treaty of Tartu which gives Estonia recognition by Soviet Russia.
1920	15 June	Adoption of the Constitution of Estonia, which came into effect on 21 December.
1921	January	Estonia is recognized as an independent state, and starts its pursuit to join League of Nations.
1922	22 September	Estonia joins the League of Nations.
1933	14–16 October	Plebiscite in favour of constitutional reform giving wide powers to a new office of the president.
1934	24 January	New constitution in effect.
1934	12 March	Konstantin Päts with the help of General Johan Laidoner set up a virtual dictatorship. Parliament is prorogued and political parties banned. Many members of the Vaps Movement are arrested.
1937	24 February	Election sees National Front winning 63 seats and all the opposition winning 17 seats.
1937	29 July	A new constitution in force with civil liberties and democracy restored but with a very strong presidency.
1938	24 April	Konstantin Päts elected president.
1938	9 May	Kaarel Eenpalu becomes prime minister of Estonia.
1939	23 August	The Molotov–Ribbentrop Pact is signed, promising mutual non-aggression between Germany and the Soviet Union and agreeing to a division of much of Europe between these two countries.
1939	12 October	Jüri Uluots becomes prime minister of Estonia.
1940	17 June	The Red Army occupies Estonia and Latvia.
1940	6 August	Estonia is unlawfully declared the Estonian SSR and incorporated into the Soviet Union.
1941		German troops (with help of Forest Brothers) take over Estonia from the Soviets.
1941	7 June	German troops begin to carry out The Holocaust in Estonia.
1941	14 June	Mass deportations by Soviet Union authorities take place in Estonia, Latvia and Lithuania.
1941	22 June	Germany attacks Soviet Union; Estonian partisans (Forest Brothers) start revolt in Southern Estonia.
1941	28 August	Sinking of a Soviet steamer with 3500 Soviet-mobilized Estonian men on board; 598 of them die.
1941	1 December	Estonian Self-Administration, headed by Hjalmar Mäe, is inaugurated by German military administration.
1944		Otto Tief is captured by Soviet forces; Jüri Uluots and members of the Tief government escape to Sweden.
1944	30 January	Battle of Narva: The first Soviet units cross Estonian border.
1944	24 February	Battle of Narva: Estonian volunteers launch a counterattack at Narva river.
1944	6 March	World War II: Soviet Army planes attack Narva in Estonia, destroying almost the entire old town.
1944	9 March	World War II: Soviet Army planes attack Tallinn, Estonia.
1944	26 July	Battle of Narva: The Soviets capture Narva.
1944	29 July	Battle of Tannenberg Line: The Estonian and German counterattack stops Soviet advance towards Tallinn.
1944	26 August	The Soviets capture most of Tartu, which becomes the frontline city for almost a month.
1944	18 September	Jüri Uluots, prime minister in capacity of president of Estonia, asks Otto Tief to form a government on the eve of the withdrawal of German forces; official gazette published proclaiming the Tief government.
1944	20 September	Otto Tief attempts to organise the defence of Tallinn against the arrival of the Red Army two days later.
1944	22 September	The Soviets capture Tallinn.
1944	19 December	The entire territory of Estonia is captured by the Red Army.
1949	25 March	Operation Priboi: An extensive deportation campaign is conducted in Estonia, Latvia and Lithuania. The Soviet authorities deport more than 92,000 people from the Baltics to remote areas of the Soviet Union.
1955	19 July	Estonian Television (ETV) began broadcasting.
1978	28 September	One of the last Forest Brother guerilla movement fighter, August Sabbe, is discovered and killed in Estonia.
1980		Youth riots in the capital of the Soviet Republic of Estonia are quickly suppressed.
1988		In Estonia, 300,000 people demonstrate for independence.
1988		Estonian becomes the official language of Estonia.
1988	16 November	The Supreme Soviet of the Estonian SSR declares that Estonia is "sovereign" but stops short of declaring independence.
1989		After 44 years, the Estonian flag is raised on the Pikk Hermann castle tower.
1989	23 August	Two million indigenous people of Estonia, Latvia and Lithuania, at this time still occupied by the Soviet Union, join hands to demand freedom and independence, forming an uninterrupted 600km human chain called the Baltic Way.
1991		Latvia and Estonia vote for independence from the Soviet Union.
1991		The United States recognizes the independence of Estonia, Latvia and Lithuania.
1991	20 August	The Supreme Council of the Republic of Estonia proclaims the restoration of Estonian independence from the Soviet Union.
1991	6 September	The Soviet Union recognizes the independence of the Baltic States.
1992		Estonia holds a referendum on its constitution.
1992		Heinrich Mark and the government in exile appointed by him cede their credentials to the newly elected Riigikogu.
1992	20 June	The Soviet ruble is replaced by the kroon.
1992	6 October	Lennart Meri is elected President of Estonia.
1994		The Russian army leaves Estonia.
1994	28 September	Car ferry MS Estonia sinks in the Baltic Sea, killing 852.

== 21st century ==
Year	Date	Event
2001		68 people died in Estonia after drinking bootleg alcohol that contained methanol.
2002		Estonia hosted the first Eurovision Song Contest in a former Soviet republic.
2002		North Atlantic Treaty Organization Summit in Prague: Bulgaria, Estonia, Latvia, Lithuania, Romania, Slovakia and Slovenia were invited to join NATO.
2003		Estonia approved joining the European Union in a referendum with 66% agreed with joining and 34% were against it.
2004	29 March	The largest expansion of the North Atlantic Treaty Organization to date takes place, allowing Bulgaria, Estonia, Latvia, Lithuania, Romania, Slovakia and Slovenia into the organization.
2004	1 May	The largest expansion to date of the European Union took place, extending the Union by 10 member-states: Poland, Lithuania, Latvia, Estonia, the Czech Republic, Slovakia, Slovenia, Hungary, Malta and Cyprus.
2005		The same storm which pounded the U.S. earlier in the month hit England, Scandinavia and the Baltic States, leaving 13 dead with widespread flooding and power cuts.
2005	10 August	A passenger helicopter en route to Helsinki, Finland crashed into the sea near Tallinn, Estonia, killing 14.
2006	9 October	Toomas Hendrik Ilves was elected President of Estonia.
2007	27 April	Russians riot in Tallinn, Estonia, about moving the Bronze Soldier. Two nights of rioting left one dead. Cyber attacks launched against Estonia.
2011	August	Toomas Hendrik Ilves is re-elected president for a second five-year term.
2016	10 October	Kersti Kaljulaid was elected as the first female President of Estonia since independence.
2021	11 October	Alar Karis was elected President of Estonia.

== See also ==
- Timeline of Tallinn history
