= Waldhof =

Waldhof may refer to:

- Waldhof, Luxembourg, a hamlet in the commune of Niederanven, Luxembourg
- Waldhof, Mannheim, a district of Mannheim, Germany
- Waldhof, the former German name for the Prussian village of Wierzonka, Poland
- a short name for SV Waldhof Mannheim, an association football club located in Mannheim
- Waldhof-Falkenstein, a municipality in the district of Bitburg-Prümin, Rhineland-Palatinate, Germany
- Waldhof (factory), former cellulose factory in Pärnu, Estonia
