= 2009 in Estonia =

- Decades: 1980s; 1990s; 2000s; 2010s; 2020s
- See also: Other events of 2009; Timeline of Estonian history

This article lists events that occurred during 2009 in Estonia.

== Incumbents ==
- President – Toomas Hendrik Ilves
- Prime Minister – Andrus Ansip

== Events ==
- Estonian municipal elections
- European Parliament election in Estonia
- Click and Grow, indoor gardening company is founded.
- 23 June – War of Independence Victory Column was unveiled.

== See also ==
- 2009 in Estonian football
- 2009 in Estonian television
