= 2010 in Estonian television =

This is a list of Estonian television related events from 2010.

== Events ==
- 12 March – Malcolm Lincoln & Manpower 4 are selected to represent Estonia at the 2010 Eurovision Song Contest with their song "Siren". They are selected to be the sixteenth Estonian Eurovision entry during Eesti Laul held at the Nokia Concert Hall in Tallinn.
- 1 September – Nick Jr. launches.

== Television shows ==
=== 1990s ===
- Õnne 13 (1993–present)

=== 2000s ===
- Eesti otsib superstaari (2007–present)

== See also ==
- 2010 in Estonia
