= 2011 in Estonian television =

This is a list of Estonian television related events from 2011.

== Events ==
- 26 February – Getter Jaani is selected to represent Estonia at the 2011 Eurovision Song Contest with her song "Rockefeller Street". She is selected to be the seventeenth Estonian Eurovision entry during Eesti Laul held at the Nokia Concert Hall in Tallinn.
- 12 June – Liis Lemsalu wins the fourth season of Eesti otsib superstaari.

== Television shows ==
=== 1990s ===
- Õnne 13 (1993–present)

=== 2000s ===
- Eesti otsib superstaari (2007–present)

== Networks and services ==
=== Channels ===
==== New channels ====
- 8 June – Duo 5

== Deaths ==
- 15 January – Ellen Alaküla (born 1927), actress
- 26 March – Enn Klooren (born 1940), actor

== See also ==
- 2011 in Estonia
