= 2010 in Estonia =

- Decades: 1990s; 2000s; 2010s; 2020s
- See also: Other events of 2010; Timeline of Estonian history

The following lists events that happened during 2010 in Estonia.

== Incumbents ==
- President: Toomas Hendrik Ilves
- Prime Minister: Andrus Ansip

== Events ==
=== July ===
- July 13 - The European Union announces that Estonia is to become the seventeenth member of the euro on 1 January 2011.

=== December ===
- December 31 - Estonia officially adopts the euro as its currency.

== Deaths ==
- 12 November – Karl Plutus, lawyer and jurist (b. 1904)

== See also ==
- 2010 in Estonian football
- 2010 in Estonian television
