= 2014 in Estonia =

- Decades: 1990s; 2000s; 2010s; 2020s
- See also: Other events of 2014; Timeline of Estonian history

The following lists events that happened during 2014 in the Republic of Estonia.

== Incumbents ==
- President: Toomas Hendrik Ilves
- Prime Minister: Andrus Ansip (until 26 March), Taavi Rõivas (starting 26 March)

== Events ==
=== February ===
- February 23 - Estonian Prime Minister Andrus Ansip announces that he will be leaving office before scheduled parliamentary elections in 2015.

=== March ===
- March 4 - Andrus Ansip resigns after nine years as prime minister of Estonia.
- March 26 - Taavi Rõivas is sworn in as Prime Minister of Estonia, succeeding Andrus Ansip and becoming the youngest government leader in the European Union at 34 years.

=== September ===
- September 3 - The President of the United States, Barack Obama, visits Estonia in a move to reassure the Baltic states ahead of a NATO summit in Wales.
- September 5 - Eston Kohver is abducted by gunpoint from the Estonian side of the border by the FSB.

=== October ===
- October 9 - Estonia becomes the first former Soviet republic to legalize gay partnerships and grant equal rights to same-sex couples.
- October 27 - The first school shooting in Estonia takes place in Viljandi.

== See also ==
- 2014 in Estonian television
