= 2008 in Estonia =

- Decades: 1980s; 1990s; 2000s; 2010s; 2020s
- See also: Other events of 2008; Timeline of Estonian history

This article lists events that occurred during 2008 in Estonia.

== Incumbents ==
- President – Toomas Hendrik Ilves
- Prime Minister – Andrus Ansip

== Events ==
- 28 June – Estonian United Left Party was established.
- 10 November – ETV2 was launched.

== See also ==
- 2008 in Estonian football
- 2008 in Estonian television
