= 1996 in Estonia =

- Decades: 1970s; 1980s; 1990s; 2000s; 2010s
- See also: Other events of 1996; Timeline of Estonian history

This article lists events that occurred during 1996 in Estonia.

== Incumbents ==
- President - Lennart Meri
- Prime Minister - Tiit Vähi

== Births ==
- 9 May - Saron Läänmäe, footballer

== Deaths ==
- 30 May - Alo Mattiisen, composer (born 1961)
- 10 July - Eno Raud, children's writer (born 1928)

== See also ==
- 1996 in Estonian football
- 1996 in Estonian television
