= 2008 in Estonian football =

- Meistriliiga winners
- FC Levadia Tallinn
- Estonian Cup winners
- FC Flora Tallinn
- UEFA Champions League
- FC Levadia Tallinn (1Q)
- UEFA Cup
- FC Flora Tallinn (1Q); FC TVMK Tallinn (1Q)
- UEFA Intertoto
- FC Trans Narva (1R)
- Estonian national team
- 2008 Baltic Cup; 2008 Mayors' Cup; 2010 World Cup qualification
- Estonian Footballer of the Year
- Raio Piiroja

The 2008 season was the 17th competitive football season in Estonia.

== National Leagues ==
=== Meistriliiga ===
Pos	Team	Pld	W	D	L	GF	GA	GD	Pts	Qualification or relegation
1	Levadia (C)	36	29	6	1	105	22	+83	93	Qualification for Champions League second qualifying round
2	Flora	36	28	7	1	113	28	+85	91	Qualification for Europa League second qualifying round (Note: Flora won the 2008–09 Estonian Cup and qualified for second qualifying round of the UEFA Europa League. Therefore, Nõmme Kalju, fourth-placed team and cup runners-up, earned a spot in the first qualifying round of the UEFA Europa League.)
3	Narva Trans	36	16	8	12	62	54	+8	56	Qualification for Europa League first qualifying round
4	Kalju	36	16	7	13	65	64	+1	55	Qualification for Europa League first qualifying round
5	Sillamäe Kalev	36	13	6	17	49	79	−30	45	
6	Tulevik	36	9	4	23	31	74	−43	31 (Note: TUL: 6 pts, 7–5; M-T: 6 pts, 5–7)	
7	Maag Tammeka	36	9	4	23	45	76	−31	31	
8	Tallinna Kalev	36	6	8	22	37	70	−33	26	
9	Vaprus (R)	36	5	2	29	41	125	−84	17	Qualification for relegation play-off
10	TVMK (Note: On 6 November 2008, the Estonian Football Association decided not to grant TVMK a license to play in Meistriliiga or Esiliiga, due to financial difficulties during the season. The Estonian Football Association allowed them to play until the end of the season and as they finished in third place, the players and coaches received bronze medals, but the club itself was dropped to 10th place. TVMK were eventually disbanded.) (R)	36	20	6	10	91	47	+44	66	Relegation to Esiliiga

Source: Estonian Football Association (in Estonian)
Rules for classification: 1) points; 2) number of wins; 3) head-to-head points; 4) head-to-head goal difference; 5) head-to-head goals scored; 6) goal difference; 7) number of goals scored.
(C) Champions; (R) Relegated

=== Esiliiga ===
Pos	Team	Pld	W	D	L	GF	GA	GD	Pts	Promotion or relegation
1	FC Levadia II (Note: Reserve teams are ineligible for promotion.) (C)	36	22	6	8	83	33	+50	72	
2	FC Kuressaare (P)	36	21	8	7	67	35	+32	71	Promotion to Meistriliiga
3	FC Flora II	36	18	8	10	62	41	+21	62	
4	FC Flora Paide LM (O, P)	36	14	11	11	58	44	+14	53	Qualification for promotion play-offs
5	Valga Warrior	36	13	9	14	46	56	−10	48	
6	Kiviõli Tamme Auto	36	11	11	14	51	66	−15	44	
7	JK Maag Tammeka II	36	11	10	15	60	63	−3	43	
8	FC Flora Rakvere	36	10	7	19	53	82	−29	37	
9	Lasnamäe Ajax	36	8	9	19	59	79	−20	33	Qualification for relegation play-offs
10	FC TVMK II (Note: On 6 November Estonian Football Association License Commission decided to take TVMK's license to play in Meistriliiga or Esiliiga, due to financial difficulties during the season. The Estonian Football Association helped them to play until the end of the season and as they finished in 3rd place, the players and coaches got bronze medals, but the club itself was demoted to 10th spot.) (R)	36	11	3	22	58	98	−40	36	Relegation to II liiga

(C) Champions; (O) Play-off winners; (P) Promoted; (R) Relegated

== Estonian FA Cup ==
=== Final ===
13 May 2008
18:45

Flora	3–1	Maag Tammeka
Post 1'; Hakola 47' (pen.), 64'		Ossipov 72' (pen.)

Kadrioru staadion, Tallinn
Attendance: 500
Referee: Hannes Kaasik

== National Teams ==
=== A Team ===
The Estonia national football team' played a total number of fifteen matches (including one unofficial) and started in the qualifying tournament for the 2010 FIFA World Cup in South Africa.

Date	Comp.	Venue	Home team	Result	Away team	Scorers
February 27	Friendly	Wronki	Poland	2 – 0	Estonia	
March 26	Friendly	A. Le Coq Arena, Tallinn	Estonia	2 – 0	Canada	Stalteri 59' (o.g.) Zahovaiko 90'
May 27	Friendly	A. Le Coq Arena, Tallinn	Estonia	1 – 1	Georgia	Kink 64' (pen.)
May 30	Baltic Cup	Skonto stadions, Riga	Latvia	1 – 0	Estonia	
May 31	Baltic Cup	Slokas Stadium, Jūrmala	Estonia	0 – 1	Lithuania	
June 4	Friendly	A. Le Coq Arena, Tallinn	Estonia	4 – 3	Faroe Islands	Zahovaiko 9' 14' Kink 28' Novikov 75'
August 20	Friendly	A. Le Coq Arena, Tallinn	Estonia	2 – 1	Malta	Purje 23' Oper 52'
September 6	WC10Q	Stade Maurice Dufrasne, Liège	Belgium	3 – 2	Estonia	Zenjov 57' Oper 90+2'
September 10	WC10Q	Bilino Polje, Zenica	Bosnia and Herzegovina	7 – 0	Estonia	
October 11	WC10Q	A. Le Coq Arena, Tallinn	Estonia	0 – 3	Spain	
October 15	WC10Q	A. Le Coq Arena, Tallinn	Estonia	0 – 0	Turkey	
November 12	Friendly	A. Le Coq Arena, Tallinn	Estonia	1 – 1	Latvia	Kink 52'
November 18	Mayors' Cup	A. Le Coq Arena, Tallinn	Estonia	1 – 0	Moldova	Voskoboinikov 56'
November 22	Mayors' Cup	Linnastaadion, Kuressaare	Estonia	1 – 1	Lithuania	S. Puri 6'
Unofficial match(es)
December 23	Friendly	Estadio Nueva Condomina, Lorca	Murcia	1 – 1	Estonia	Kink 23'

=== U-21 ===
Date	Comp.	Venue	Home team	Result	Away team	Scorers
March 26	EC09Q	Univé Stadion, Emmen	Netherlands	3 – 0	Estonia	
May 29	Baltic Cup	Slokas Stadium, Jūrmala	Latvia	2 – 1	Estonia	Kallaste 21'
May 30	Baltic Cup	Daugava Stadium, Riga	Lithuania	4 – 0	Estonia	
August 20	EC09Q	Linnastaadion, Rakvere	Estonia	1 – 0	North Macedonia	Saag 11'

=== U-19 ===
Date	Comp.	Venue	Home team	Result	Away team	Scorers
April 22	Friendly	A. Le Coq Arena, Tallinn	Estonia	0 – 1	Denmark	
April 24	Friendly	A. Le Coq Arena 1st grass pitch, Tallinn	Estonia	2 – 1	Denmark	Sinimägi 11' Artjunin 15'
June 3	Baltic Cup	Kohila staadion, Kohila	Estonia	1 – 0	Lithuania	Artjunin 90+3' (pen.)
June 5	Baltic Cup	Kohila staadion, Kohila	Estonia	0 – 2	Latvia	
August 12	Friendly	A. Le Coq Arena 1st grass pitch, Tallinn	Estonia	0 – 0	Georgia	
August 14	Friendly	A. Le Coq Arena 1st grass pitch, Tallinn	Estonia	0 – 2	Georgia	
October 5	EC19Q	Kadrioru Stadium, Tallinn	Croatia	1 – 4	Estonia	Alliku 8' 29' Ojamaa 33' Anier 68'
October 7	EC19Q	Kadrioru Stadium, Tallinn	Estonia	0 – 5	Belgium	
October 10	EC19Q	Kadrioru Stadium, Tallinn	Kazakhstan	1 – 2	Estonia	Kaldoja 45+1' Alliku 51'
Unofficial match(es)
May 19	Friendly Tournament	Paestum stadium	Italy amateur team	3 – 3; 4–5 pen.	Estonia	Anier 26' 28' Subbotin 42'
May 20	Friendly Tournament	Paestum stadium	(Germany) Rhineland	1 – 3	Estonia	Mones 10' Artjunin 19' (pen.) Paponov 45'
May 22	Friendly Tournament	Paestum stadium	Estonia	3 – 0	Northern Ireland	Paponov 26' Prosa 30' Tenno 47'
May 23	Friendly Tournament	Paestum stadium	Estonia	0 – 3	Slovenia U-18	
May 25	Friendly Tournament	Paestum stadium	Estonia	0 – 0; 3–4 pen.	Romania	

=== U-18 ===
Date	Comp.	Venue	Home team	Result	Away team	Scorers
March 28	Friendly	Ķeizarmežs Stadium, Riga	Latvia	6 – 0	Estonia	
June 9	Friendly	Rauma Stadium, Rauma	Finland	5 – 0	Estonia	
June 11	Friendly	Rauma Stadium, Rauma	Finland	4 – 1	Estonia	Kaljumäe 60'
Unofficial match(es)
May 7	Friendly	A. Le Coq Arena 1st grass pitch, Tallinn	Estonia	4 – 0	(Estonia) Maag Tammeka II	Stepanjan 55' Kaljumäe 78' 89' Kõlu 81'
September 5	Friendly	Kalevi Keskstaadion, Tallinn	(Estonia) Tallinna Kalev	2 – 4	Estonia	Tšernei 29' Krillo 41' Kõlu 48' Saks 80'

=== U-17 ===
Date	Competition	Venue	Home team	Result	Away team	Scorers
17:00 April 29	Friendly	Tallinn, Estonia	Estonia	0 – 1	Denmark	
11:00 May 1	Friendly	Tallinn, Estonia	Estonia	1 – 4	Denmark	Tamm 11'
15:00 May 21	Friendly	Kernu, Estonia	Estonia	0 – 7	Austria	
15:00 June 3	Baltic Cup	Kernu, Estonia	Estonia	1 – 0	Lithuania	Karpov 40'
18:00 July 11	Baltic Cup	Tallinn, Estonia	Estonia	1 – 2	Latvia	Karpov 22'
September 9	Friendly	Finland	Finland	1 – 1	Estonia	Karpov 45'
September 11	Friendly	Valga, Estonia	Finland	4 – 0	Estonia	
October 14	Friendly	Valga, Estonia	Estonia	2 – 2	Latvia	Karpov 29', Mööl 51'
October 22	UEFA Euro 2009 U-17 qualifying	La Orotava, Spain	Spain	6 – 0	Estonia	
October 24	UEFA Euro 2009 U-17 qualifying	La Orotava, Spain	England	7 – 0	Estonia	
October 27	UEFA Euro 2009 U-17 qualifying	La Orotava, Spain	Armenia	0 – 1	Estonia	Anier 34'

=== U-16 ===
Date	Comp.	Venue	Home team	Result	Away team	Scorers
August 27	Friendly	Kohila staadion, Kohila	Estonia	0 – 1	Poland	
August 29	Friendly	Kohila staadion, Kohila	Estonia	0 – 1	Poland	
October 19	Friendly	A. Le Coq Arena, Tallinn	Estonia	1 – 5	Germany	Viikna 33'
