= 1996 in Estonian television =

This is a list of Estonian television related events from 1996.

== Events ==
- 27 January - Maarja-Liis Ilus and Ivo Linna are selected to represent Estonia at the 1996 Eurovision Song Contest with their song "Kaelakee hääl". They are selected to be the second Estonian Eurovision entry during Eurolaul held at the Decolte Nightclub in Tallinn.

== Television shows ==
=== 1990s ===
- Õnne 13 (1993–present)

== Networks and services ==
=== Channels ===
==== Closed channels ====
- 10 March - EVTV/RTV
- 23 March - Tipp TV

== Deaths ==
- 14 March – Sophie Sooäär (born 1914), actress
- 9 June – Salme Reek (born 1907), actress

== See also ==
- 1996 in Estonia
