= 1994 in Estonian television =

This is a list of Estonian television related events from 1994.

== Events ==
- 26 February - Silvi Vrait is selected to represent Estonia at the 1994 Eurovision Song Contest with her song "Nagu merelaine". She is selected to be the first Estonian Eurovision entry during Eurolaul held at the Linnahall in Tallinn.
- 30 April - Estonia enters the Eurovision Song Contest for the first time with "Nagu merelaine" performed by Silvi Vrait.

== Television shows ==
=== 1990s ===
- Õnne 13 (1993–present)

== Births ==
- 15 March – Märten Metsaviir, actor

== See also ==
- 1994 in Estonian football
- 1994 in Estonia
