= 2007 in Estonian football =

Meistriliiga winners
- FC Levadia Tallinn

Estonian Cup winners
- FC Levadia Tallinn

SuperCup winners
- FC Trans Narva

UEFA Champions League
- FC Levadia Tallinn (1Q)

UEFA Cup
- FC Flora Tallinn (1Q); FC TVMK Tallinn (1Q)

UEFA Intertoto
- FC Trans Narva (1R)

Estonian national team
- 2008 UEFA Euro qualifying

Estonian Footballer of the Year
- Raio Piiroja

The 2007 season is the 16th competitive football season in Estonia.

== National Leagues ==
=== Meistriliiga ===
Pos	Team	Pld	W	D	L	GF	GA	GD	Pts	Qualification or relegation
1	Levadia (C)	36	29	4	3	126	20	+106	91	Qualification for Champions League first qualifying round
2	Flora	36	26	5	5	108	30	+78	83	Qualification for UEFA Cup first qualifying round (Note: As Flora Tallinn are guaranteed European football in the UEFA Cup as league runners-up, their spot in the UEFA Cup as Estonian Cup winners is transferred to the next best team in the league. TVMK Tallinn will therefore play in the 2008-09 season of the UEFA Cup)
3	TVMK	36	25	4	7	116	36	+80	79	Qualification for UEFA Cup first qualifying round
4	Narva Trans	36	25	3	8	89	28	+61	78	Qualification for Intertoto Cup first round
5	Maag Tammeka	36	18	8	10	54	40	+14	62	
6	Tallinna Kalev	36	13	4	19	44	74	−30	43	
7	Tulevik	36	11	4	21	43	80	−37	37	
8	Vaprus	36	8	1	27	35	96	−61	25	
9	Kuressaare (R)	36	5	3	28	25	94	−69	18	Qualification for relegation play-offs
10	Lasnamäe Ajax (R)	36	1	2	33	14	153	−139	5	Relegation to Esiliiga

Source: Estonian Football Association (in Estonian)
Rules for classification: 1) points; 2) number of wins; 3) head-to-head points; 4) head-to-head goal difference; 5) head-to-head goals scored; 6) goal difference; 7) number of goals scored.
(C) Champions; (R) Relegated

=== Esiliiga ===
Pos	Team	Pld	W	D	L	GF	GA	GD	Pts	Promotion or relegation
1	Levadia II Tallinn (Note: Reserve teams are ineligible for promotion.) (C)	36	27	5	4	95	20	+75	86	
2	Flora II Tallinn	36	24	6	6	97	33	+64	78	
3	Kalev Sillamäe (P)	36	20	9	7	67	40	+27	69	Promotion to Meistriliiga
4	TVMK II Tallinn	36	15	8	13	81	68	+13	53	
5	Maag Tammeka II Tartu	36	14	11	11	51	39	+12	53	
6	Kalju Nõmme (P)	36	13	9	14	69	69	0	48	Qualification for promotion play-offs
7	Warrior Valga	36	13	5	18	72	73	−1	44	
8	Tulevik II Viljandi (R)	36	9	7	20	37	84	−47	34	Qualification for relegation play-offs
9	Välk 494 Tartu (R)	36	7	8	21	49	93	−44	29	Relegation to II liiga
10	FC Elva (R)	36	3	2	31	17	116	−99	11	Relegation to II liiga

(C) Champions; (P) Promoted; (R) Relegated

== Estonian FA Cup ==
=== Final ===
15 May 2007
18:45

Levadia	3–0	Narva Trans
Nahk 26' (pen.), 45+1' (pen.); Kink 49'

Kadrioru staadion, Tallinn
Attendance: 1,300
Referee: Sten Kaldma

== National Teams ==
=== A Team ===
The Estonia national football team played a total number of fifteen matches (including one unofficial) and did not qualify for Euro 2008 in Austria and Switzerland.

Date	Comp.	Venue	Home team	Result	Away team	Scorers
February 3	Friendly	Estadio Municipal de Chapín, Jerez, Spain	Poland	4 – 0	Estonia	
February 7	Friendly	Sports Park, Domžale	Slovenia	1 – 0	Estonia	
March 24	EC08Q	A. Le Coq Arena, Tallinn	Estonia	0 – 2	Russia	
March 28	EC08Q	Ramat Gan Stadium, Ramat Gan	Israel	4 – 0	Estonia	
June 2	EC08Q	A. Le Coq Arena, Tallinn	Estonia	0 – 1	Croatia	
June 6	EC08Q	A. Le Coq Arena, Tallinn	Estonia	0 – 3	England	
August 22	EC08Q	A. Le Coq Arena, Tallinn	Estonia	2 – 1	Andorra	Piiroja 34' Zelinski 90+2'
September 8	EC08Q	Maksimir Stadium, Zagreb	Croatia	2 – 0	Estonia	
September 12	EC08Q	Skopje City Stadium, Skopje	North Macedonia	1 – 1	Estonia	Piiroja 17'
October 13	EC08Q	Wembley, London	England	3 – 0	Estonia	
October 17	Friendly	A. Le Coq Arena, Tallinn	Estonia	0 – 1	Montenegro	
November 9	Friendly	Prince Abdullah Al Faisal Stadium, Jeddah	Saudi Arabia	2 – 0	Estonia	
November 17	EC08Q	Estadi Comunal, Andorra la Vella	Andorra	0 – 2	Estonia	Oper 31' Lindpere 60'
November 21	Friendly	MHSK Stadium, Tashkent	Uzbekistan	0 – 0	Estonia	
Unofficial match(es)
May 15	Friendly	A. Le Coq Arena 1st grass pitch, Tallinn	Estonia	3 – 0	Estonia U-21	Terehhov 13' Leetma 17' Viikmäe 55'

=== U-21 ===
Date	Comp.	Venue	Home team	Result	Away team	Scorers
June 3	EC09Q	Kadrioru Stadium, Tallinn	Estonia	0 – 1	Norway	
September 11	EC09Q	Skopje City Stadium, Skopje	North Macedonia	1 – 0	Estonia	
October 14	EC09Q	A. Le Coq Arena, Tallinn	Estonia	0 – 3	Netherlands	
October 18	EC09Q	A. Le Coq Arena, Tallinn	Estonia	0 – 4	Switzerland	
November 17	EC09Q	La Blancherie, Delémont	Switzerland	5 – 0	Estonia	
November 20	EC09Q	Sør Arena, Kristiansand	Norway	2 – 0	Estonia	
Unofficial match(es)
May 9	Friendly	Helsinki	(Finland) HJK Helsinki	0 – 0	Estonia	
May 15	Friendly	A. Le Coq Arena 1st grass pitch, Tallinn	Estonia A Team	3 – 0	Estonia	
