= 2009 UEFA European Under-21 Championship qualification Group 5 =

Football tournament qualification stage

The teams competing in group 5 of the 2009 UEFA European Under-21 Championships qualifying competition are Estonia, Macedonia, Netherlands, Norway, and Switzerland.

== Standings ==
Team	Pld	W	D	L	GF	GA	GD	Pts
Switzerland	8	5	1	2	16	5	+11	16
Netherlands	8	5	1	2	10	3	+7	16
Norway	8	3	3	2	7	6	+1	12
Macedonia	8	2	3	3	5	6	−1	9
Estonia	8	1	0	7	1	19	−18	3

Key: Pts Points, Pld Matches played, W Won, D Drawn, L Lost, GF Goals for, GA Goals against, GD Goal Difference

== Matches ==
3 June 2007
14:00 UTC+2

Estonia	0 – 1	Norway
	Report	Hanssen 90'

Kadriorg Stadium, Tallinn
Referee: Sergiy Berezka (Ukraine)

22 August 2007
16:30 UTC+2

Macedonia	0 – 1	Netherlands
	Report	Drenthe 25'

Skopje City Stadium, Skopje
Referee: Aleksei Nikolaev (Russia)

7 September 2007
20:45 UTC+2

Norway	0 – 1	Netherlands
	Report	Drenthe 71' (pen.)

Fredrikstad Stadion, Fredrikstad
Referee: Martin Atkinson (England)
8 September 2007
17:00 UTC+2

Switzerland	1 – 1	Macedonia
Derdiyok 36'	Report	Zlatkovski 78'

Stadion Niedermatten, Wohlen
Referee: William Collum (Scotland)

11 September 2007
16:00 UTC+2

Macedonia	1 – 0	Estonia
Alimi 75'	Report

Skopje City Stadium, Skopje
Referee: Luc Wilmes (Luxembourg)

12 October 2007
19:00 UTC+2

Norway	2 – 1	Switzerland
Elyounoussi 67'; Demidov 86'	Report	Derdiyok 83'

Fredrikstad Stadion, Fredrikstad
Referee: Andrejs Sipailo (Latvia)
12 October 2007
19:30 UTC+2

Estonia	0 – 3	Netherlands
	Report	Sno 2', 44'; Beerens 53'

A Le Coq Arena, Tallinn
Referee: Mihaly Fabian (Hungary)

16 October 2007
19:00 UTC+2

Macedonia	1 – 1	Norway
Zlatkovski 47'	Report	Bjørdal 32'

Gjorče Petrov Stadium, Skopje
Referee: Stelios Trifonos (Cyprus)
16 October 2007
17:45 UTC+2

Estonia	0 – 4	Switzerland
	Report	Derdiyok 12', 49'; Estéban 58'; Ural 74'

A Le Coq Arena, Tallinn
Referee: Valery Vialichka (Belarus)

16 November 2007
20:00 UTC+2

Netherlands	1 – 0	Macedonia
Sno 28'	Report

Stadion de Goffert, Nijmegen
Referee: Petteri Kari (Finland)
17 November 2007
16:00 UTC+2

Switzerland	5 – 0	Estonia
Derdiyok 2', 45'; Feltscher 23'; Ziegler 30' (pen.); Lustenberger 50'	Report

La Blancherie, Delémont
Referee: Haim Jakov (Israel)

20 November 2007
18:00 UTC+2

Norway	2 – 0	Estonia
Demidov 45+1'; Khalili 80'	Report

Kristiansand Arena, Kristiansand
Referee: Alan Black (Northern Ireland)

26 March 2007
18:00 UTC+2

Netherlands	3 – 0	Estonia
De Guzman 50', 90'; Aissati 83'	Report

Univé Stadion, Emmen
Referee: Magnus Thorisson (Iceland)
26 March 2007
14:00 UTC+2

Macedonia	2 – 1	Switzerland
Trickovski 12'; Zlatkovski 32'	Report	Estéban 35'

Kumanovo Stadium, Kumanovo
Referee: Hubert Siejewicz (Poland)

23 May 2007
20:00 UTC+2

Netherlands	0 – 1	Switzerland
	Report	Lustenberger 49'

Willem II Stadion, Tilburg
Referee: Bülent Yıldırım (Turkey)

20 August 2007
19:45 UTC+2

Switzerland	2 – 0	Norway
Lustenberger 53'; Nikci 78'	Report

Stade Tourbillon, Sion
Referee: Aleksei Nikolaev (Russia)
20 August 2007
13:00 UTC+2

Estonia	1 – 0	Macedonia
Saag 11'	Report

Rakvere Linnastaadion, Rakvere
Referee: Ignasi Villamayor Rozados (Andorra)

5 September 2007
20:00 UTC+2

Netherlands	1 – 1	Norway
De Guzman 53'	Report	Førsund 90'

Parkstad Limburg Stadion, Kerkrade
Referee: Marcin Borski (Poland)

9 September 2007
19:00 UTC+2

Switzerland	1 – 0	Netherlands
Ziegler 86'	Report

Stadion Breite, Schaffhausen
Referee: Markus Strömbergsson (Sweden)
9 September 2007
19:00 UTC+2

Norway	0 – 0	Macedonia
	Report

Fredrikstad Stadion, Fredrikstad
Referee: Ian Stokes (Republic of Ireland)

== Goalscorers ==
Pos	Player	Country	Goals
1	Eren Derdiyok	Switzerland	6
2	Jonathan de Guzman	Netherlands	3
2	Zoran Zlatkovski	Macedonia	3
2	Fabian Lustenberger	Switzerland	3
2	Evander Sno	Netherlands	3
6	Julián Estéban	Switzerland	2
6	Vadim Demidov	Norway	2
6	Royston Drenthe	Netherlands	2
6	Reto Ziegler	Switzerland	2

1 goal

- Estonia: Kaimar Saag
- Macedonia: Armend Alimi, Ivan Tričkovski
- Netherlands: Ismaïl Aissati, Roy Beerens
- Norway: Johan Lædre Bjørdal, Tarik Elyounoussi, Arnar Førsund, Petter Bruer Hanssen, Aram Khalili
- Switzerland: Frank Feltscher, Adrian Nikci, Murat Ural
