= 2012 in Estonian television =

This is a list of Estonian television related events from 2012.

== Events ==
- 3 March - Eesti otsib superstaari season 3 winner Ott Lepland is selected to represent Estonia at the 2012 Eurovision Song Contest with his song "Kuula". He is selected to be the eighteenth Estonian Eurovision entry during Eesti Laul held at the Nokia Concert Hall in Tallinn.
- 23 December - Rasmus Rändvee wins the fifth season of Eesti otsib superstaari.

== Television shows ==
=== 1990s ===
- Õnne 13 (1993–present)

=== 2000s ===
- Eesti otsib superstaari (2007–present)

== See also ==
- 2012 in Estonia
