= 2013 in Estonian television =

This is a list of Estonian television related events from 2013.

== Events ==
- 2 March - Eesti otsib superstaari season 1 winner Birgit Õigemeel is selected to represent Estonia at the 2013 Eurovision Song Contest with her song "Et uus saaks alguse". She is selected to be the nineteenth Estonian Eurovision entry during Eesti Laul held at the Nokia Concert Hall in Tallinn.

== Television shows ==
=== 1990s ===
- Õnne 13 (1993–present)

=== 2000s ===
- Eesti otsib superstaari (2007–present)

== Networks and services ==
=== Channels ===
==== New channels ====
- 13 June - KidZone Max

== See also ==
- 2013 in Estonia
