= 1999 in Estonia =

- Decades: 1970s; 1980s; 1990s; 2000s; 2010s
- See also: Other events of 1999; Timeline of Estonian history

This article lists events that occurred during 1999 in Estonia.

== Incumbents ==
- President – Lennart Meri
- Prime Minister – Mart Siimann (until 25 March), Mart Laar (after 25 March)
- Speaker – Toomas Savi

== Events ==
- 7 March – 1999 Estonian parliamentary election.
- 25 March – Mart Laar's second cabinet was formed.
- 17 October – 1999 Estonian municipal elections.
- Meriton Grand Hotel was opened.

== Deaths ==
- 16 May – Lembit Oll, Estonian chess player

== See also ==
- 1999 in Estonian football
- 1999 in Estonian television
