= 1995 in Estonia =

- Decades: 1970s; 1980s; 1990s; 2000s; 2010s
- See also: Other events of 1995; Timeline of Estonian history

This article lists events that occurred during 1995 in Estonia.

== Events ==
- 27 February – The Union Bank of Finland opened a branch in Estonia, being the first foreign bank to open a branch in Estonia.
- March – elections for VIII Riigikogu.

=== Full date unknown ===
- Click OK, an Estonian pop music group is formed. (in Estonian)

== See also ==
- 1995 in Estonian football
- 1995 in Estonian television
