= 1995 in Estonian television =

This is a list of Estonian television related events from 1995.

== Events ==
- 7 May – the final of the music competition "Kaks takti ette". The winner was Tiiu Tulp.

== Networks and services ==
=== Channels ===
==== New channels ====
- 1 September - Tipp TV

==== Closed channels ====
- 31 December - EVTV
- 31 December - RTV

== See also ==
- 1995 in Estonia
