= 2014 in Estonian television =

This is a list of Estonian television related events from 2014.

== Events ==
- 1 March - Tanja is selected to represent Estonia at the 2014 Eurovision Song Contest with her song "Amazing". She is selected to be the twentieth Estonian Eurovision entry during Eesti Laul held at the Nokia Concert Hall in Tallinn.

== Debuts ==
- Padjaklubi (TV3)

== Television shows ==
=== 1990s ===
- Õnne 13 (ETV; 1993–present)

=== 2000s ===
- Eesti otsib superstaari (TV3; 2007–present)

== See also ==
- 2014 in Estonia
