= 1993 in Estonian television =

This is a list of Estonian television related events from 1993.

== Events ==
- 1 August – television channel EVTV started as an independent television channel.

== Networks and services ==
=== Channels ===
==== New channels ====
- 1 August – EVTV
- 1 October - Kanal 2

==== Closed channels ====
- 30 July – RTV/ETV

== See also ==
- 1993 in Estonia
