= 2007 in Estonia =

- Decades: 1980s; 1990s; 2000s; 2010s; 2020s
- See also: Other events of 2007; Timeline of Estonian history

This article lists events that occurred during 2007 in Estonia.

== Incumbents ==
- President – Toomas Hendrik Ilves
- Prime Minister – Andrus Ansip

== Events ==
- Tallinn Synagogue was completed.
- Swissôtel Tallinn was opened.
- Estonian Public Broadcasting was established.

== See also ==
- 2007 in Estonian football
- 2007 in Estonian television
