= 1994 in Estonia =

- Decades: 1970s; 1980s; 1990s; 2000s; 2010s
- See also: Other events of 1994; Timeline of Estonian history

This article lists events that occurred during 1994 in Estonia.

== Events ==
- The Russian army left Estonia.
- 28 September – Sinking of the MS Estonia: the car ferry MS Estonia sank in the Baltic Sea, killing 852.

== Births ==
15 March – Märten Metsaviir, actor

== See also ==
- 1994 in Estonian football
- 1994 in Estonian television
