= 2001 in Estonia =

- Decades: 1980s; 1990s; 2000s; 2010s; 2020s
- See also: Other events of 2001; Timeline of Estonian history

This article lists events that occurred during 2001 in Estonia.

== Incumbents ==
- President – Arnold Rüütel
- Prime Minister – Mart Laar

== Events ==
- 12 May – musicians Tanel Padar and Dave Benton won with the song "Everybody" the Eurovision Song Contest 2001.
- 8 December – new political party Res Publica was established.

== See also ==
- 2001 in Estonian football
- 2001 in Estonian television
