= Tartu Department Store =

Shopping center in Tartu, Estonia

Coordinates: 58.377733°N 26.727204°E

Logo of Tartu Department Store

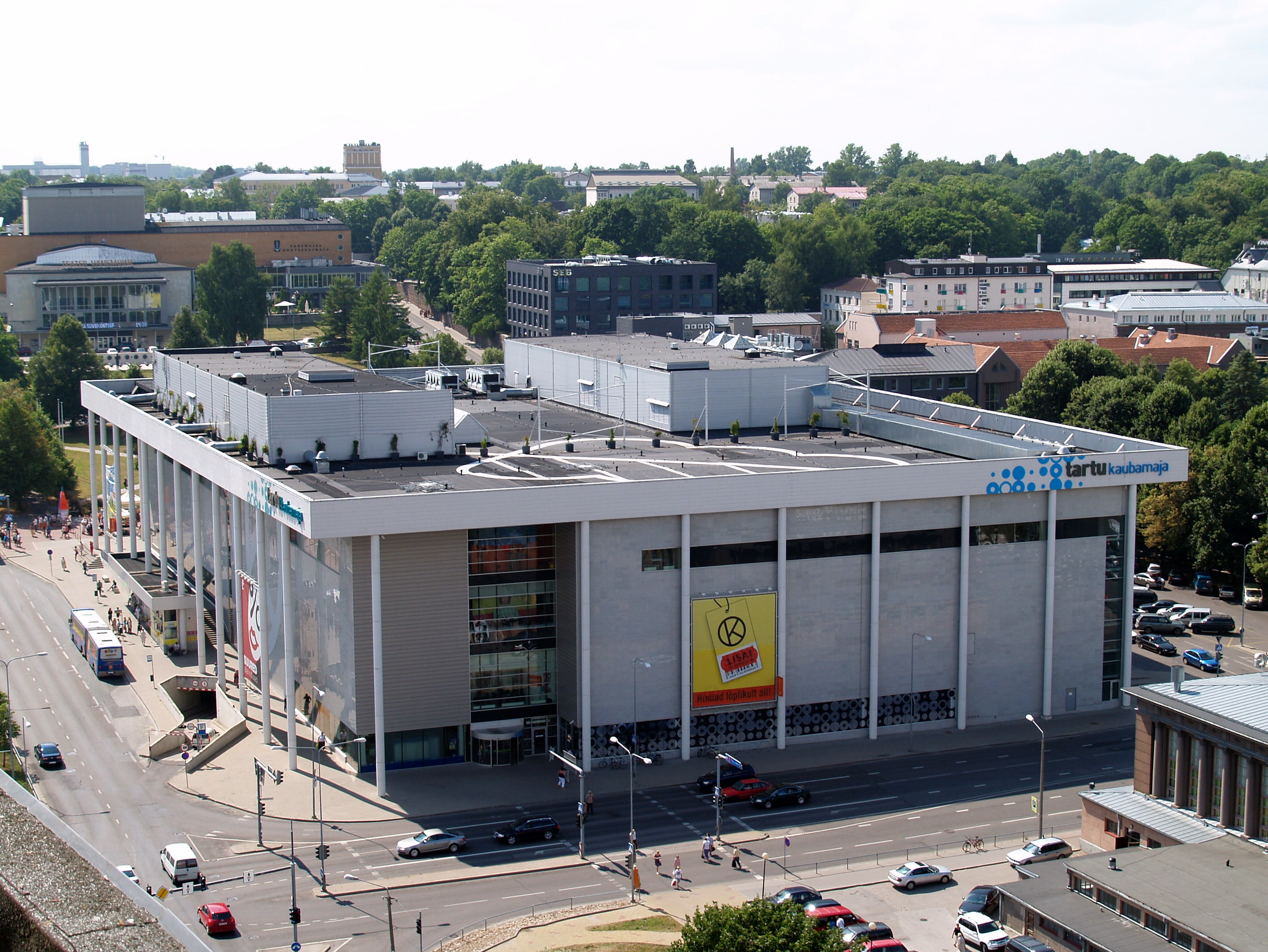
Tartu Department Store

Tartu Department Store (Estonian: Tartu Kaubamaja) is a shopping mall in Tartu, Estonia. The mall belongs to Tallinna Kaubamaja Grupp.

The mall was built in 2005. In 2013, a new children's and home world was opened in Tartu Kaubamaja. In 2015–16, the mall was renovated.
