= 2002 in Estonia =

- Decades: 1980s; 1990s; 2000s; 2010s; 2020s
- See also: Other events of 2002; Timeline of Estonian history

This article lists events that occurred during 2002 in Estonia.

== Incumbents ==
- President – Arnold Rüütel
- Prime Minister – Siim Kallas

== Events ==
- 3 September – Riigikogu ratifies Kyoto Protocol.
- October – local elections took place.

== See also ==
- 2002 in Estonian football
- 2002 in Estonian television
