= Saron Läänmäe =

Estonian footballer

Personal information
- Full name: Saron Läänmäe
- Date of birth: 9 May 1996 (age 30)
- Place of birth: Tallinn, Estonia
- Position: Defender

Youth career
- Kotkad
- 2009–2010: Flora Tallinn

Senior career*
Years	Team	Apps	(Gls)
2011–2015	Flora Tallinn	49	(16)
2020	Flora Tallinn	14	(7)

International career^{‡}
2009–2013	Estonia U17	23	(4)
2013–2015	Estonia U19	29	(7)
2012–2013	Estonia	7	(0)
- * Club domestic league appearances and goals as of 16:14, 28 May 2022 (UTC) ‡ National team caps and goals as of 16:14, 28 May 2022 (UTC)

Saron Läänmäe (born 9 May 1996) is an Estonian former footballer, who has played as a defender for Naiste Meistriliiga club Flora Tallinn and the Estonia women's national football team.

In 2015 Läänmäe enrolled at the University of Central Lancashire and paused her elite football career while rehabilitating an ankle injury. She later played college soccer for the university team. On her graduation she rejoined Flora Tallinn. She retired from football after the 2020 season when her enjoyment of the sport waned.
