= 2013 in Estonia =

- Decades: 1990s; 2000s; 2010s; 2020s
- See also: Other events of 2013; Timeline of Estonian history

This article lists events that occurred during 2013 in Estonia.

== Incumbents ==
- President: Toomas Hendrik Ilves
- Prime Minister: Andrus Ansip

== Deaths ==
Elmar Tampõld

== See also ==
- 2013 in Estonian television
