= 2000 in Estonia =

- Decades: 1980s; 1990s; 2000s; 2010s; 2020s
- See also: Other events of 2000; Timeline of Estonian history

This article lists events that occurred during 2000 in Estonia.

== Incumbents ==
- President – Lennart Meri
- Prime Minister – Mart Laar

== Events ==
- Estonian Information Technology College established.

== Deaths ==
- 2 June – Lepo Sumera, composer (b. 1950)
- 28 October – Aare Laanemets, actor and theatre director (b. 1954)

== See also ==
- 2000 in Estonian football
- 2000 in Estonian television
