= Petter Bruer Hanssen =

Norwegian footballer (born 1986)

Personal information
- Date of birth: 8 January 1986 (age 40)
- Place of birth: Tønsberg, Norway
- Positions: Defensive midfielder; winger

Youth career
- –2003: Stokke IL

Senior career*
Years	Team	Apps	(Gls)
2004–2006	FK Tønsberg	65	(7)
2007–2008	Odd Grenland	26	(0)
2008–2012	IK Start	56	(0)
2013	Stokke IL		

International career
2002	Norway U16	5	(0)
2003	Norway U17	12	(0)
2004	Norway U18	12	(2)
2005	Norway U19	12	(4)
2007–2008	Norway U21	8	(1)
- * Club domestic league appearances and goals

Petter Bruer Hanssen (born 8 January 1986) is a Norwegian footballer who plays as a midfielder. He joined IK Start in August 2008 for a reported fee of 2 million NOK. However, due to injuries, he was only able to amass 24 minutes of playing time in his first season with Start. He is known as a hard-working team player with good passing abilities.

== Career statistics ==
Club	Season	Division	League		Cup		Total	
Club	Season	Division	Apps	Goals	Apps	Goals	Apps	Goals
FK Tønsberg	2004	2. divisjon	21	6	0	0	21	6
FK Tønsberg	2005	1. divisjon	22	3	0	0	22	3
FK Tønsberg	2006	2. divisjon	22	1	0	0	22	1
Odd	2007	Tippeligaen	20	0	6	1	26	1
Odd	2008	1. divisjon	6	0	0	0	6	0
Start	2008	1. divisjon	1	0	0	0	1	0
Start	2009	Tippeligaen	26	0	3	0	29	0
Start	2010	Tippeligaen	16	0	2	0	18	0
Start	2011	Tippeligaen	13	0	2	0	15	0
Career Total			147	10	13	1	160	11
