= Click OK =

Estonian musical group

Click OK was an Estonian pop music group. Four members of the group included Monika Sjomgina, Kariny Joala, Grete Rämmal and Kairi Siht. Kariny Joala has also been a member of the Estonian Bad Angels dance group. The group released an album called Lase lõdvaks ('loosen up') in 1998. Many of their songs have also appeared on Estonian various artists compilation albums. These songs include "Casanova", "Narkopolitsei" ('the drug police') and christmas-themed "Taas kord saabub jõulumees" ('once again Santa Claus arrives'), which can't be found on the Lase lõdvaks album.

== Members ==
- Kariny Joala
- Monika Sjomgina
- Grete Rämmal
- Kairi Siht

== Discography ==
Lase lõdvaks

Studio album by Click OK
- Released: 1998
- Length: 45:57
- Label: Bermuda
- Producer: Boom Productions

- Lase lõdvaks ('loosen up') (1998)
  1. "Intro."
  2. "Click OK"
  3. "Lase lõdvaks" ('loosen up')
  4. "Psühhoterror" ('psychoterror')
  5. "Öö on kuum" ('the night is hot')
  6. "Vehi mis sa vehid" ('wave all you want')
  7. "Hüpertoonia" ('hypertonia')
  8. "Must meel" ('black mind' ~ frustration)
  9. "Selle ilma mured" ('the worries of this world')
  10. "Kui sulgub ring" ('when the circle closes')
  11. "Tantsi edasi" ('keep dancing')
  12. "Psühhoterror : extended."

== Single songs ==
- "Casanova"
- "Narkopolitsei" ('the drug police')
- "Taas kord saabub jõulumees" ('once again Santa Claus arrives')
