= 2002 in Estonian football =

- Meistriliiga champions
- FC Flora Tallinn
- Esiliiga champions
- FC Warrior Valga
- Estonian Cup winners
- FC Levadia Tallinn
- Estonian Super Cup winners
- FC Flora Tallinn
- Teams in Europe
- FC Flora Tallinn; FC Levadia Maardu; TVMK Tallinn; FC Narva Trans
- Estonian national team
- UEFA Euro 2004 qualifying
- Estonian Footballer of the Year
- Andres Oper; Raio Piiroja

The 2002 Estonian Football season was the 11th full year of competitive football (soccer) in Estonia since the nation gained independence from the Soviet Union in 1991-08-20.

== National Leagues ==
=== Meistriliiga ===
Pos	Team	Pld	W	D	L	GF	GA	GD	Pts	Qualification or relegation
1	Flora (C)	28	20	4	4	79	25	+54	64	Qualification for Champions League first qualifying round
2	Maardu Levadia (Note: Club changed their name to Levadia Tallinn in 2004)	28	18	8	2	70	25	+45	62	Qualification for UEFA Cup qualifying round (Note: TVMK Qualified As Estonian Cup winners)
3	TVMK	28	16	5	7	90	35	+55	53	Qualification for UEFA Cup qualifying round
4	Narva Trans	28	14	5	9	54	49	+5	47	Qualification for Intertoto Cup first round
5	Tulevik	28	10	6	12	51	52	−1	36	
6	Tallinna Levadia (Note: Club changed their name to Levadia II Tallinn in 2004)	28	6	5	17	32	70	−38	23	
7	Lootus (R)	28	5	6	17	24	67	−43	21	Qualification for relegation play-offs
8	Levadia Pärnu (R)	28	1	5	22	19	96	−77	8	Relegation to Esiliiga

Source: RSSSF – Estonia 2002
Rules for classification: 1) points; 2) number of wins; 3) head-to-head points; 4) head-to-head goal difference; 5) head-to-head goals scored; 6) goal difference; 7) number of goals scored.
(C) Champions; (R) Relegated

=== Esiliiga ===
Pos	Team	Pld	W	D	L	GF	GA	GD	Pts	Promotion or relegation
1	Valga (C, P)	28	26	1	1	86	20	+66	79	Promotion to Meistriliiga
2	Kuressaare (P)	28	17	2	9	82	50	+32	53	Qualification for promotion play-offs
3	Maardu	28	13	8	7	79	55	+24	47	
4	TJK	28	13	4	11	56	56	0	43	
5	Merkuur	28	10	3	15	47	73	−26	33	
6	Tammeka (R)	28	9	6	13	47	66	−19	33	Qualification for relegation play-offs
7	Elva (R)	28	5	5	18	40	61	−21	20	Relegation to II Liiga
8	Sillamäe Kalev (R)	28	3	3	22	23	79	−56	12	Relegation to II Liiga

Source: rsssf.com
Rules for classification: 1) points; 2) head-to-head points; 3) head-to-head goal difference; 4) head-to-head goals scored; 5) goal difference; 6) number of goals scored.
(C) Champions; (P) Promoted; (R) Relegated

== Estonian FA Cup ==
=== Final ===
31 May 2002

Levadia Tallinn	2–0	Levadia Maardu
Jagudin 43', 84'

A. Le Coq Arena, Tallinn
Attendance: 200
Referee: Sten Kaldma

== Estonian Super Cup ==
25 November 2002

Flora	1–1 (a.e.t.)	Levadia Tallinn
Lindpere 80'		Voskoboinikov 12'
Penalties
Lindpere (penalty scored); Hamre (penalty scored); Reim (penalty scored); Allas (penalty scored)	4–2	(penalty missed) Pašins; (penalty scored) Kirilov; (penalty scored) Jagudin; (penalty missed) Dmitrijev

A. Le Coq Arena, Tallinn
Attendance: 150
Referee: Sten Kaldma
