= 2009 Estonian municipal elections =

Municipal elections were held in Estonia on 18 October 2009, with advance voting between 8 and 14 October 2009.

The result was a victory for Estonian Centre Party.

== Results ==
Party	Votes	%
Estonian Centre Party	207,565	31.53
Estonian Reform Party	110,263	16.75
Pro Patria and Res Publica Union	92,068	13.99
Social Democratic Party	49,540	7.53
People's Union of Estonia	12,683	1.93
Estonian Greens	7,774	1.18
Party of Estonian Christian Democrats	1,033	0.16
Estonian Independence Party	289	0.04
Other parties and independents	176,998	26.89
Total	658,213	100.00
Valid votes	658,213	99.31
Invalid/blank votes	4,600	0.69
Total votes	662,813	100.00
Registered voters/turnout	1,094,317	60.57
Source: VVK
