= 2011 in Estonian football =

The 2011 season is the 90th season of competitive football in Estonia.

== National teams ==
The home team or the team that is designated as the home team is listed in the left column; the away team is in the right column.

Win Draw Loss

=== Senior ===
==== Friendly matches ====
9 February 2011	Bulgaria	2–2	Estonia	Antalya, Turkey
21:00 UTC+02	Popov 40' (pen.), 83' (pen.)	(Report)	Vassiljev 20' (pen.), 80' (pen.)	Stadium: Mardan Stadium; Attendance: 200; Referee: Krisztián Selmeczi (Hungary)

25 March 2011	Estonia	2–0	Uruguay	Tallinn, Estonia
20:00 UTC+03	Vassiljev 61'; Zahovaiko 65'	(Report)		Stadium: A. Le Coq Arena; Attendance: 6,817; Referee: Antti Munukka (Finland)

19 June 2011	Chile	4–0	Estonia	Santiago, Chile
19:00 UTC-04	Fernández 21'; Ponce 41'; Suazo 45' (pen.); Sánchez 50'	(Report)		Stadium: Estadio Monumental; Attendance: 20,000; Referee: Martín Vázquez (Uruguay)

23 June 2011	Uruguay	3–0	Estonia	Rivera, Uruguay
19:30 UTC-03	Cáceres 12'; Reintam 54' (o.g.); Lodeiro 71'	(Report)		Stadium: Estadio Atilio Paiva Olivera; Attendance: 25,000; Referee: Saúl Laverni (Argentina)

10 August 2011	Turkey	3–0	Estonia	Istanbul, Turkey
21:30 UTC+03	Belözoğlu 8' (pen.); Kazim-Richards 28', 35'	(Report)		Stadium: Türk Telekom Arena; Referee: Lee Probert (England)

11 October 2011	Estonia	0–2	Ukraine	Tallinn, Estonia
20:00 UTC+03		Report	Husyev 45'; Aliyev 68'	Stadium: A. Le Coq Arena; Attendance: 4,501; Referee: Robert Malek (Poland)

==== UEFA Euro 2012 qualifying ====
29 March 2011 Group C	Estonia	1–1	Serbia	Tallinn, Estonia
21:30 UTC+03	Vassiljev 84'	(Report)	Pantelić 38'	Stadium: A. Le Coq Arena; Attendance: 5,185; Referee: Bas Nijhuis (Netherlands)

3 June 2011 Group C	Italy	3–0	Estonia	Modena, Italy
20:50 UTC+02	Rossi 21'; Cassano 39'; Pazzini 68'	(Report)		Stadium: Stadio Alberto Braglia; Attendance: 21,151; Referee: Alexandru Tudor (Romania)

7 June 2011 Group C	Faroe Islands	2–0	Estonia	Toftir, Faroe Islands
19:30 UTC+01	Benjaminsen 43' (pen.); A. Hansen 47'	(Report)		Stadium: Svangaskarð; Attendance: 1,715; Referee: Antti Munukka (Finland)

2 September 2011 Group C	Slovenia	1–2	Estonia	Ljubljana, Slovenia
20:45 UTC+02	Matavž 78'	Report	Vassiljev 29' (pen.); Purje 81'	Stadium: Stožice Stadium; Attendance: 15,480; Referee: Stephan Studer (Switzerland)

6 September 2011 Group C	Estonia	4–1	Northern Ireland	Tallinn, Estonia
21:30 UTC+03	Vunk 28'; Kink 32'; Zenjov 59'; Saag 90+3'	Report	Piiroja 40' (o.g.)	Stadium: A. Le Coq Arena; Attendance: 8,660; Referee: Daniel Stålhammar (Sweden)

7 October 2011 Group C	Northern Ireland	1–2	Estonia	Belfast, Northern Ireland
19:45 UTC+1	Davis 22'	Report	Vassiljev 77' (pen.), 84'	Stadium: Windsor Park; Attendance: 12,768; Referee: Manuel Gräfe (Germany

11 November 2011 Play-offs leg 1	Estonia	v	Republic of Ireland	Tallinn, Estonia
21:45 UTC+2				Stadium: A. Le Coq Arena

15 November 2011 Play-offs leg 2	Republic of Ireland	v	Estonia	Dublin, Republic of Ireland
19:45 UTC				Stadium: Aviva Stadium

=== Under-21 ===
==== 2013 UEFA European Under-21 Football Championship qualification ====
1 September 2011 Group 5	Estonia U-21	0–0	Switzerland U-21	Tallinn, Estonia
19:00 UTC+03		Report		Stadium: A. Le Coq Arena; Attendance: 612; Referee: Anar Salmanov (Azerbaijan)

10 October 2011 Group 5	Estonia U-21	0–1	Croatia U-21	Tartu, Estonia
16:00 UTC+03		Report	Vukušić 89' (pen.)	Stadium: Tamme Stadium; Attendance: 1,387; Referee: Ioannis Anastasiou (Cyprus)

10 November 2011 Group 5	Spain U-21	v	Estonia U-21

14 November 2011 Group 5	Croatia U-21	v	Estonia U-21

=== Under-19 ===
==== 2011 UEFA European Under-19 Football Championship elite qualification ====
24 May 2011 Group 1	Estonia U-19	0–1	Croatia U-19	Rovinj, Croatia
17:00 UTC+02		(Report)	Mić 40'	Stadium: Stadion Valbruna; Referee: Steven Mclean (Scotland)

26 May 2011 Group 1	Portugal U-19	3–0	Estonia U-19	Umag, Croatia
17:00 UTC+02	Carvalho 44'; Cá 56'; Cavaleiro 88'	(Report)		Stadium: Gradski Stadion; Referee: Eli Hacmon (Israel)

29 May 2011 Group 1	Estonia U-19	0–0	Belgium U-19	Poreč, Croatia
17:00 UTC+02		(Report)		Stadium: Stadion Veli Jože; Referee: Eli Hacmon (Israel)

== League Tables ==
=== Meistriliiga ===
Pos	Team	Pld	W	D	L	GF	GA	GD	Pts	Qualification or relegation
1	Flora (C)	36	26	8	2	100	24	+76	86	Qualification for Champions League second qualifying round
2	Nõmme Kalju	36	24	7	5	82	23	+59	79	Qualification for Europa League first qualifying round (Note: The winners of the 2011–12 Estonian Cup competition (Levadia) will qualify for the first qualifying round of UEFA Europa League.)
3	Narva Trans	36	22	7	7	107	29	+78	73	Qualification for Europa League first qualifying round
4	Levadia	36	21	10	5	76	25	+51	73	Qualification for Europa League first qualifying round
5	Sillamäe Kalev	36	17	3	16	77	59	+18	54	
6	Paide	36	13	6	17	40	51	−11	45	
7	Tammeka	36	11	6	19	57	75	−18	39	
8	Viljandi	36	8	6	22	37	69	−32	30	
9	Kuressaare (O)	36	7	5	24	28	68	−40	26	Qualification for relegation play-offs
10	Ajax (R)	36	0	4	32	11	192	−181	4	Relegation to Esiliiga

Source: Estonian Football Association (in Estonian)
Rules for classification: 1st - points; 2nd - fewest withdrawals or annulled matches; 3rd - overall wins; 4th - head-to-head points; 5th - head-to-head goal difference; 6th - goal difference; 7th - goals scored.
If two or more teams on the top have the same number of points by the end of the season, the aforementioned rules will not apply and additional game(s) will be played to determine the champions
(C) Champions; (O) Play-off winners; (R) Relegated

=== Esiliiga ===
Pos	Team	Pld	W	D	L	GF	GA	GD	Pts	Promotion, qualification or relegation
1	Tallinna Kalev (P)	35	20	10	5	99	37	+62	70	Promotion to Esiliiga
2	Infonet	35	18	11	6	98	47	+51	65	Qualification to Promotion/relegation_play-offs
3	Tamme Auto	35	20	4	11	70	60	+10	64	
4	Levadia II	35	16	12	7	66	40	+26	60	
5	Flora U21	35	16	7	12	66	48	+18	55	
6	Puuma	35	15	9	11	79	69	+10	54	
7	Lootus	35	9	11	15	56	71	−15	38	
8	Pärnu	35	8	11	16	55	60	−5	35	Qualification to Promotion/relegation play-offs
9	TJK Legion (R)	35	7	5	23	42	102	−60	26	Relegation to II Liiga
10	Warrior (R)	35	3	6	26	32	129	−97	15	Relegation to II Liiga

Updated to match(es) played on 30 October 2011. Source: soccerway
Rules for classification: 1. points; 2. goal difference; 3. number of goals scored
(P) Promoted; (R) Relegated

=== II Liiga ===
==== East / North ====
Pos	Team	Pld	W	D	L	GF	GA	GD	Pts	Promotion, qualification or relegation
1	Rakvere (P)	26	21	3	2	100	29	+71	66	Promotion to Esiliiga B
2	Nõmme Kalju FC II (Q)	26	19	4	3	94	19	+75	61	Qualification to Promotion/relegation playoffs
3	Sillamäe Kalev II	26	18	2	6	102	37	+65	56	
4	Alko	26	13	5	8	41	40	+1	44	
5	Orbiit	26	11	8	7	48	37	+11	41	
6	Tallinna Kalev II	26	12	1	13	59	48	+11	37	
7	Infonet II	26	11	3	12	57	59	−2	36	
8	Dünamo Tallinn	26	11	3	12	49	64	−15	36	
9	M.C. Tallinn	26	8	10	8	51	74	−23	34	
10	TJK Legion II	26	9	4	13	36	58	−22	31	
11	Kaitseliit Kalev	26	8	6	12	47	57	−10	30	
12	Tabasalu (Q)	26	5	4	17	28	48	−20	19	Qualification to Promotion/relegation play-off
13	Ajax Lasnamäe II (R)	26	4	1	21	33	99	−66	13	Relegation to III Liiga
14	Olympic (R)	26	3	4	19	32	108	−76	13	Relegation to III Liiga

Updated to match(es) played on 23 October 2011. Source: soccerway
Rules for classification: 1) points; 2) goal difference; 3) number of goals scored
(P) Promoted; (Q) Qualified for the phase indicated; (R) Relegated

==== West / South ====
Pos	Team	Pld	W	D	L	GF	GA	GD	Pts	Promotion, qualification or relegation
1	HaServ (P)	26	20	2	4	77	23	+54	62	Promotion to Esiliiga B
2	Tammeka II (Q)	26	20	2	4	71	29	+42	62	Qualification to Promotion/relegation playoffs
3	Tulevik	26	17	3	6	85	42	+43	54	
4	Paide Kumake	26	17	3	6	64	28	+36	54	
5	Luunja	26	17	2	7	67	52	+15	53	
6	Sörve	26	17	2	7	46	35	+11	53	
7	Nõmme United	26	12	3	11	55	58	−3	39	
8	Emmaste	26	11	1	14	54	46	+8	34	
9	10 Premium	26	11	0	15	46	74	−28	33	
10	Ganvix	26	10	1	15	45	86	−41	31	
11	Tarvastu	26	7	1	18	32	67	−35	22	
12	Pärnu Kalevi (Q)	26	5	3	18	41	73	−32	18	Qualification to Promotion/relegation play-off
13	Rummu Dünamo (R)	26	3	2	21	31	84	−53	11	Relegation to III Liiga
14	Viljandi Kotkad (R)	26	1	3	22	11	28	−17	6	Relegation to III Liiga

Updated to match(es) played on 23 October 2011. Source: soccerway
Rules for classification: 1) points; 2) goal difference; 3) number of goals scored
(P) Promoted; (Q) Qualified for the phase indicated; (R) Relegated

== Domestic cups ==
=== Estonian Cup ===
Fourth Round
Flora	4
Lootos	1
Joker	3
Sillamäe Kalev II	0
HaServ	1
Ganvix	0
Ajax Lasnamäe	4
Nõmme United	1
Tammeka	0
Trans	1
Tallinna Kalev	2
Tammeka II	1
Emmaste	4
Alko	1
Sillamäe Kalev	12
Tamme Auto	1

Quarterfinals
Flora
Joker	w/o
HaServ	0
Ajax Lasnamäe (a.e.t.)	4
Trans (a.e.t.)	1
Tallinna Kalev	0
Emmaste	0
Sillamäe Kalev	1

Semifinals
Flora	6
Ajax Lasnamäe	0
Sillamäe Kalev	1 (16)
Trans (a.e.t.)	1 (17)

Final
Trans	0
Flora	2

Home teams listed on top of bracket. (AET): At Extra Time

=== Final ===
10 May 2011
19:45 UTC+03

Trans	0–2	Flora
	(Report)	Jürgenson 48'; Dupikov 78'

A. Le Coq Arena, Tallinn
Attendance: 390
Referee: Hannes Kaasik

=== Estonian Supercup ===
1 March 2011
18:45 UTC+02

Flora	0 – 0 (a.e.t.)	Levadia
	(Report)
Penalties
Jürgenson (penalty scored); Frolov (penalty scored); Anier (penalty scored); Meerits (penalty scored); Dupikov (penalty scored)	5–3	Nahk (penalty missed); Volodin (penalty scored); Kalimullin (penalty scored); Morozov (penalty scored)

Sportland Arena, Tallinn
Attendance: 305
Referee: Ain Karutoom

== Estonian clubs in international competitions ==
Club	Competition	Final round
Flora	2011–12 UEFA Champions League	Second qualifying round
Trans	2011–12 UEFA Europa League	First qualifying round
Kalju	2011–12 UEFA Europa League	First qualifying round
Levadia	2011–12 UEFA Europa League	Second qualifying round

=== FC Flora Tallinn ===
12 July 2011 Champions League Second qualifying round	Shamrock Rovers (Republic of Ireland)	1–0	(Estonia) Flora	Dublin, Ireland
20:00 UTC+01	Turner 34'	(Report)		Stadium: Tallaght Stadium; Attendance: 5,026; Referee: Jakob Kehlet (Denmark)

19 July 2011 Champions League Second qualifying round	Flora (Estonia)	0–0	(Republic of Ireland) Shamrock Rovers	Tallinn, Estonia
18:45 UTC+03		(Report)		Stadium: A. Le Coq Arena; Attendance: 2,970; Referee: Dimitar Meckarovski (Macedonia)

=== JK Narva Trans ===
30 June 2011 Europa League First qualifying round	Trans (Estonia)	1–4	(North Macedonia) Rabotnički	Tallinn, Estonia
18:30 UTC+03	Yepikhin 34'	(Report)	Velkovski 16'; Manevski 51'; Petkovski 73'; Grozdanoski 88'	Stadium: A. Le Coq Arena; Attendance: 200; Referee: Alan Mario Sant (Malta)

7 July 2011 Europa League First qualifying round	Rabotnički (North Macedonia)	3–0	(Estonia) Trans	Skopje, Macedonia
20:00 UTC+02	Petrović 45'; Manevski 81'; Vujčić 90'	(Report)		Stadium: Philip II Arena; Attendance: 700; Referee: Roman Hrubeš (Czech Republic)

=== JK Nõmme Kalju ===
30 June 2011 Europa League First qualifying round	Honka (Finland)	0–0	(Estonia) Kalju	Vantaa, Finland
19:00 UTC+03		(Report)		Stadium: ISS Stadion; Attendance: 2,100; Referee: Miroslav Zelinka (Czech Republic)

7 July 2011 Europa League First qualifying round	Kalju (Estonia)	0–2	(Finland) Honka	Tallinn, Estonia
19:30 UTC+03		(Report)	Savage 48'; Dudu 77'	Stadium: A. Le Coq Arena; Attendance: 2,250; Referee: Fariz Yusifov (Azerbaijan)

=== FC Levadia Tallinn ===
14 July 2011 Europa League Second qualifying round	Differdange 03 (Luxembourg)	0–0	(Estonia) Levadia	Luxembourg City, Luxembourg
20:00 UTC+02		(Report)		Stadium: Stade Josy Barthel; Attendance: 674; Referee: Vusal Aliyev (Azerbaijan)

21 July 2011 Europa League Second qualifying round	Levadia (Estonia)	0–1	(Luxembourg) Differdange 03	Tallinn, Estonia
18:45 UTC+03		(Report)	Lebresne 32'	Stadium: A. Le Coq Arena; Attendance: 1,550; Referee: Lorenc Jemini (Albania)
