= 1997 in Estonia =

- Decades: 1970s; 1980s; 1990s; 2000s; 2010s
- See also: Other events of 1997; Timeline of Estonian history

This article lists events that occurred during 1997 in Estonia.

== Incumbents ==
- President: Lennart Meri
- Prime Minister: Tiit Vähi (until 17 March), Mart Siimann (from 17 March)

== Events ==
- Tallinn Black Nights Film Festival begins.
- Euro University established.
- 4 December – Tallinn Old Town added to UNESCO World Heritage List.
- 13 December – six countries (including Estonia) invited to the European Union enlargement process. Negotiations related to Estonia begin on 31 March 1998.

== Births ==
- 24 March – Maarja Johanna Mägi, actress
- 8 October – Carmel Kallemaa, Canadian rhythmic gymnast

== See also ==
- 1997 in Estonian football
- 1997 in Estonian television
