= Meriton Grand Hotel Tallinn =

Hotel in Tallinn, Estonia

Park Inn by Radisson Meriton Conference & Spa Hotel Tallinn
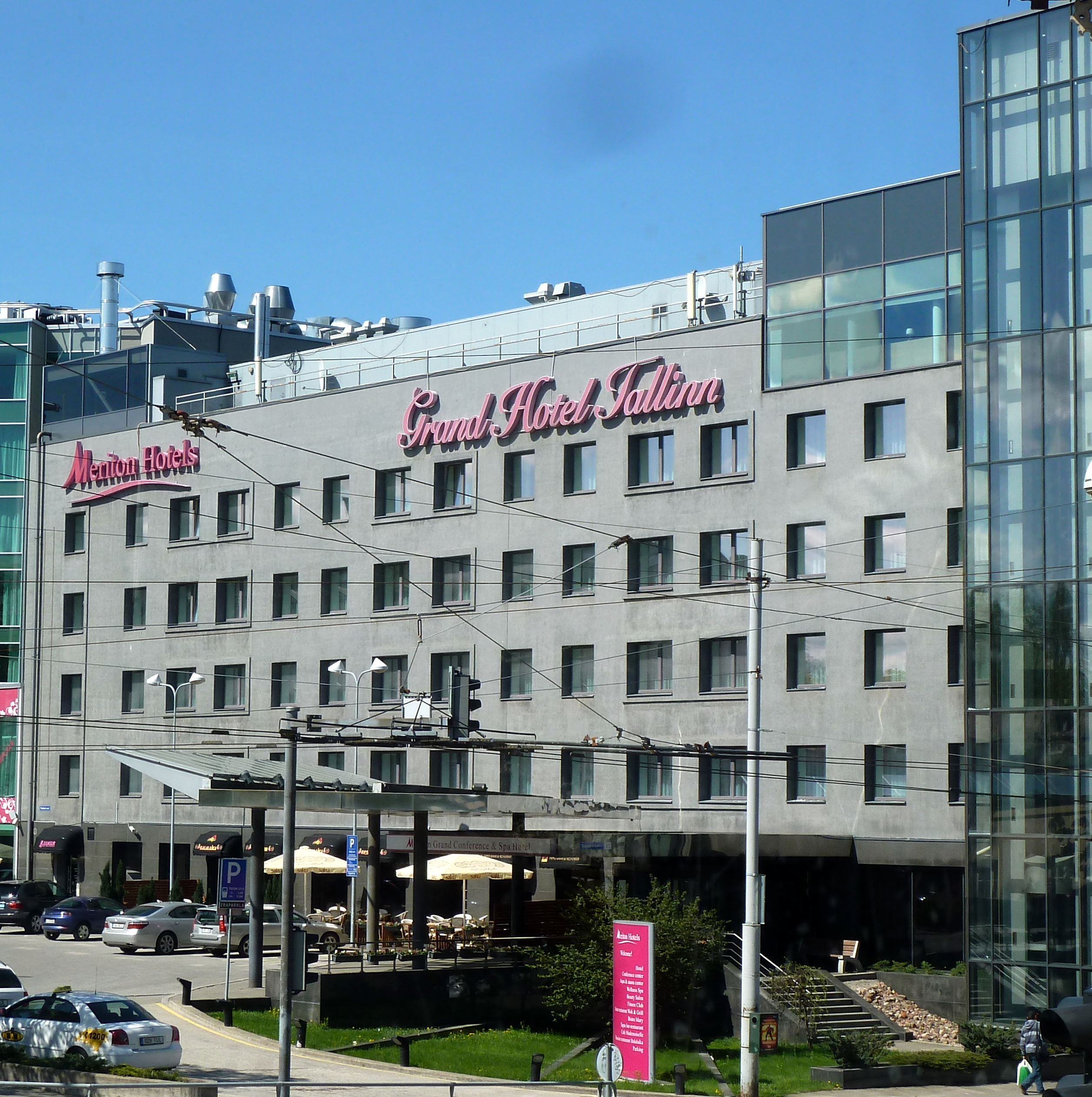
- Location in Tallinn

General information
- Location: Tallinn, Estonia
- Coordinates: 59°26′8″N 24°43′55″E
- Opening: 1999
- Operator: Meriton

Other information
- Number of rooms: 465

Park Inn by Radisson Meriton Conference & Spa Hotel Tallinn is a four-star hotel in Tallinn, Estonia, to the west of Alexander Nevsky Cathedral. The hotel was established in 1999. Its restaurant is noted for its international and Belgian cuisine and is considered one of the finest in the city. The hotel has 465 guestrooms, of which 157 are "classic" rooms, 280 standard, 12 triple, 13 junior suites, 2 suites with sauna and a Grand suite with both a sauna and jacuzzi.
