= 2005 in Estonia =

- Decades: 1980s; 1990s; 2000s; 2010s; 2020s
- See also: Other events of 2005; Timeline of Estonian history

This article lists events that occurred during 2005 in Estonia.

== Incumbents ==
- President – Arnold Rüütel
- Prime Minister – Juhan Parts (until 12 April); Andrus Ansip (starting 12 April)

== Events ==
- Tartu Department Store was built.
- 10 August – Copterline Flight 103.

== See also ==
- 2005 in Estonian television
