= 2012 in Estonia =

- Decades: 1990s; 2000s; 2010s; 2020s
- See also: Other events of 2012; Timeline of Estonian history

The following lists events that happened during 2012 in Estonia.

== Incumbents ==
- President: Toomas Hendrik Ilves
- Prime Minister: Andrus Ansip

== Events ==
- Estonia in the Eurovision Song Contest 2012 - Estonia is represented by Ott Lepland with "Kuula", it places 6th with 120 points.
- Aleksei Dressen, a former Estonian Internal Security Service officer, is convicted of spying on Estonia for the Federal Security Service and is sentenced to 16 years in prison at the Harju County Court.
- Estonia at the 2012 Summer Olympics - Gerd Kanter wins bronze in the men's discus throw and Heiki Nabi wins silver at the men's Greco-Roman 120 kg event.

== Deaths ==
- 24 April – Erast Parmasto, botanist and mycologist (b. 1928)
- 5 May –Laine Mesikäpp, Estonian actress, singer and folk song collector (b. 1917).

== See also ==
- 2012 in Estonian football
- 2012 in Estonian television
