= Julián Estéban =

Swiss-Spanish footballer (born 1986)

Julián Esteban
Personal information
- Full name: Julián Esteban
- Date of birth: 16 September 1986 (age 40)
- Place of birth: Geneva, Switzerland
- Height: 1.74 m (5 ft 8 1/2 in)
- Position: Striker

Youth career
- 1993–1996: FC City
- 1996–1997: FC Aïre-le-Lignon
- 1997–2004: Servette

Senior career*
Years	Team	Apps	(Gls)
2006	Servette	17	(14)
2007–2010	Stade Rennais	8	(1)
2009–2010	→ Servette (loan)	14	(1)
2010–2013	Servette	53	(11)

International career^{‡}
2006–2007	Switzerland U21	11	(6)
- * Club domestic league appearances and goals as of 23 March 2013 ‡ National team caps and goals as of 7 October 2007

Julián Esteban (born 16 September 1986) is a Swiss retired footballer. He spent most of his playing career at Servette FC.

== Football career ==
Born in Geneva, Estebán was an academy product of hometown club Servette FC. He made his first team breakthrough in the 2006–07 season, and scored a remarkable 14 goals in 17 games for the second division side, in only the first half of the season. A host of top European clubs, including Arsenal FC, Ajax Amsterdam and NK Dinamo Zagreb were interested in his services.

In October 2006, Esteban signed a four-year contract with Stade Rennais FC, worth approximately 7 million Swiss Franc, effective as of January of the following year. He became the fourth Swiss to join the French outfit, after Christophe Ohrel and Marco Grassi and Alexander Frei (who also played for Servette before Rennes, which also eventually led to some comparisons between the pair, due to their goalscoring prowess).

On 3 March 2007, Esteban played his first league match for Rennes, against AJ Auxerre, appearing four minutes in a 0–1 away loss. He appeared very rarely throughout his first two 1/2 seasons combined, less than 10 matches. In summer 2009 turned back to his home club Servette FC on loan from Stade Rennais FC until 30 June 2010. During this loan spell he appeared 14 times, scoring twice.

On 31 July 2010, Estéban signed for Servette on a permanent contract, after Stade Rennais F.C. agreed to terminate his contract. His time at Stade Rennais F.C. was disappointing and he was very injury prone, therefore not being able to take part in many games and unable to prove himself.

On 8 January 2013, Estéban, in his 26th year, decided to hang up his playing boots as the injuries kept on piling up for him.

== International career ==
Esteban was also a Swiss under-21 international.
