= 2014 Viljandi school shooting =

2014 school shooting in Estonia

Viljandi school shooting
- Paalalinna School (Estonia)
- Location: Paalalinna School, Viljandi, Estonia
- Date: 27 October 2014 c. 14:00 EET
- Attack type: School shooting
- Weapon: .38-caliber Rossi Model 851 revolver
- Deaths: 1
- Injuries: 0
- Perpetrator: Vahur Ruut
- Motive: Resentment (reason disputed)

The Viljandi school shooting was a school shooting that took place on 27 October 2014 at Paalalinna School in Viljandi, Estonia. A 15-year-old student, Vahur Ruut, fatally shot his German-language teacher, Ene Sarap, during a class. No other students or staff were physically injured. It was the first known school shooting in Estonia.

== Background ==
Vahur Ruut was a ninth-grade student at Paalalinna School. He lived on the outskirts of Viljandi and was described by classmates and teachers as very nice, generally quiet and average in his school performance, with occasional poor grades. In April 2014, police found a knife in his schoolbag during a drug raid at the school. Authorities spoke with his family about the incident roughly ten days before the shooting. He was also known to draw swastikas and SS runes on his school work.

Ruut had expressed interest in weapons. His father legally owned a Rossi Model 851 revolver, which was stored in a locked cabinet at home. The father had previously shown the weapon to his son and taken him to practice shooting. In the weeks before the incident, Ruut researched school shootings, revolvers, and prison sentences online. He also messaged friends about the possibility of becoming a murderer and posted content related to weapons on social media. Court materials later indicated that the plan to kill the teacher formed at least two weeks earlier.

Ruut had a conflict with German teacher Ene Sarap over grades. He told friends and his father that he disliked her and claimed she treated him poorly or touched him inappropriately. Prosecutors and subsequent investigation found no evidence supporting claims of bullying or inappropriate conduct by the teacher. Neither Ruut nor his parents reported any concerns to the school administration before the shooting.

Ene Sarap, aged 56, had taught German at the school for many years and was regarded as a strict but respected teacher. She had previously been named Viljandi County Teacher of the Year in 2007.

== The shooting ==
On the morning of 27 October 2014, the first school day after the autumn half-term break, Ruut took the key to his father's gun cabinet from his parents' bedroom, removed the revolver and nine cartridges, and brought them to school hidden in his clothing. During a break before the sixth period, he loaded the revolver in a bathroom and showed it to two classmates, who later said they thought it might be a toy.

German class for the small elective group of five students began around 13:20. Approximately 30–40 minutes into the lesson, while Sarap was writing on the blackboard, Ruut stood up, drew the revolver, and fired multiple shots. He emptied the cylinder (six rounds). Three bullets struck Sarap; she fell and died at the scene. Ruut reloaded the revolver, took the teacher's key and locked the classroom door, declaring that he was holding the other four students as hostages. After pleading from the students, he let them leave and they escaped unharmed. Ruut placed the gun on a desk and remained in the classroom. He sent a message to a friend stating that he had shot the German teacher.

School staff were alerted by a class teacher. Principal Aavo Palo entered the classroom, moved the revolver away from Ruut, and staff escorted him to the corridor. Police received the call at 13:55 and arrived within minutes. Ruut did not resist arrest. An ambulance arrived shortly afterward. Other students were evacuated to the school gymnasium.

== Investigation and trial ==
Police confirmed that the revolver belonged to Ruut's father and had been stored according to legal requirements. Ruut admitted to the shooting immediately. He was initially held and later transferred for psychiatric evaluation. He was found fit to stand trial.

Because Ruut was a minor, the trial was held behind closed doors under juvenile procedures. In October 2015, Tartu County Court (sitting in Viljandi) convicted him of intentional killing and illegal handling of a firearm and ammunition. He was sentenced to nine years' imprisonment. The court rejected the defence argument that he had acted in a state of sudden strong emotional disturbance caused by the teacher's behaviour, finding no evidence of provocation. The sentence was upheld on appeal by Tartu Circuit Court in March 2016, with only minor changes to costs. The Supreme Court declined to hear a further appeal.

Under Estonian law, the maximum sentence for a minor convicted of intentional killing was ten years. The court also ordered Ruut and his parents to pay a total of €10,000 in non-pecuniary damages to the victim's family.

== Aftermath ==
The incident led to nationwide discussions in Estonia about school safety, youth mental health, and firearm storage laws. Government officials and educators reviewed emergency procedures, and the event prompted calls for improved support systems for students.

Ruut served part of his sentence in a juvenile facility before transfer to an adult prison. On 30 May 2019, Viru County Court ordered his release on parole after he had served approximately four and a half years. The probationary period ran until 27 October 2023 and included conditions such as employment or registration with the unemployment office, possible psychiatric treatment, and continued family therapy. No serious objections were raised by the prison service or prosecutors at the parole hearing.
