= 2011 in Estonia =

- Decades: 1990s; 2000s; 2010s; 2020s
- See also: Other events of 2011; Timeline of Estonian history

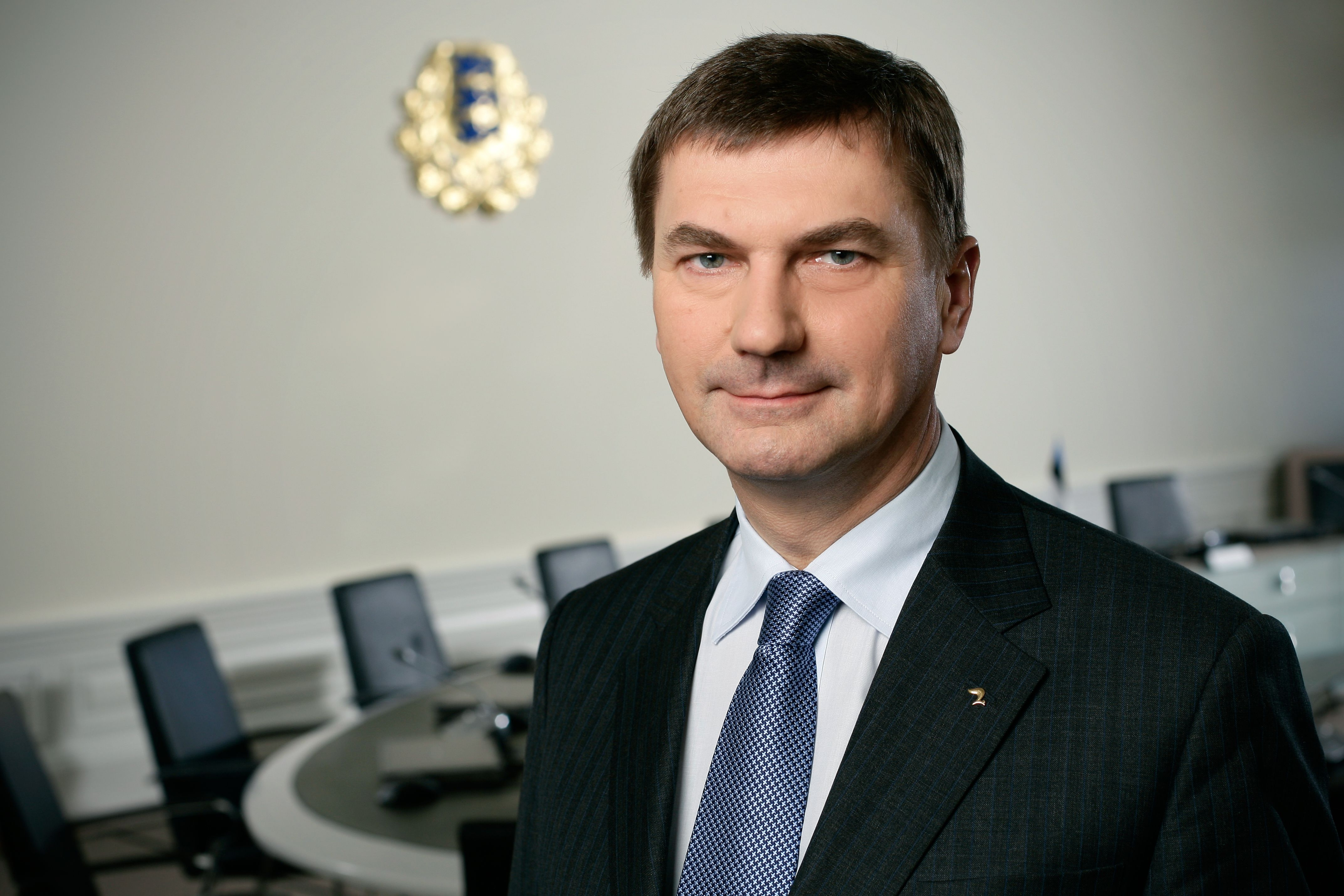
Andrus Ansip, 2011

Events in the year 2011 in Estonia.

== Incumbents ==
- President: Toomas Hendrik Ilves
- Prime Minister: Andrus Ansip

== Events ==
- January 1 – Estonia joins the Euro, Tallinn became the European Capital of Culture.
- March 6 – 2011 Estonian parliamentary election

== Arts and entertainment ==
- Estonia in the Eurovision Song Contest 2011.

== Sports ==
- Football (soccer) competitions: 2011 in Estonian football, Meistriliiga, Estonian Cup, Esiliiga
- 2011 Nordic Junior World Ski Championships

== Deaths ==
- Enn Klooren

== See also ==
- 2011 in Estonian football
- 2011 in Estonian television
