= 1993 in Estonia =

- Decades: 1970s; 1980s; 1990s; 2000s; 2010s
- See also: Other events of 1993; Timeline of Estonian history

This article lists events that occurred during 1993 in Estonia.

== Incumbents ==
- President - Lennart Meri
- Prime Minister - Mart Laar

== Events ==
- 27 May – The Supreme Court of Estonia resumes its operations after the end of the Soviet occupation of Estonia. Instead of Tallinn where it had operated in 1935–1940, it is moved back to Tartu where it had operated in 1920–1935.
- 10 September – Pope John Paul II visits Estonia and Latvia.

== Births ==
- 14 June - Svetlana Issakova, figure skater

== See also ==
- 1993 in Estonian football
- 1993 in Estonian television
