= 2006 in Estonia =

- Decades: 1980s; 1990s; 2000s; 2010s; 2020s
- See also: Other events of 2006; Timeline of Estonian history

This article lists events that occurred during 2006 in Estonia.

== Incumbents ==
- President – Arnold Rüütel (until 9 October); Toomas Hendrik Ilves (starting 9 October)
- Prime Minister – Andrus Ansip

== Events ==
- 17 February – Kumu was established.
- 13 July – Viru Prison was established.
- 25 November – political party Estonian Greens was established.

== See also ==
- 2006 in Estonian television
