= 2003 in Estonian football =

- Meistriliiga champions
- FC Flora Tallinn
- Esiliiga champions
- FC Lootus Kohtla-Järve
- Estonian Cup winners
- FC TVMK Tallinn
- Teams in Europe
- FC Flora Tallinn; FC Levadia Maardu; TVMK Tallinn; FC Narva Trans
- Estonian national team
- UEFA Euro 2004 qualifying
- Estonian Footballer of the Year
- Mart Poom

The 2003 season was the 12th full year of competitive football (soccer) in Estonia since gaining independence from the Soviet Union on August 20, 1991.

== National leagues ==
=== Meistriliiga ===
Pos	Team	Pld	W	D	L	GF	GA	GD	Pts	Qualification or relegation
1	Flora (C)	28	24	4	0	105	21	+84	76	Qualification for Champions League first qualifying round
2	TVMK	28	20	5	3	82	26	+56	65	Qualification for UEFA Cup first qualifying round (Note: Levadia Maardu qualified as 2003–04 Estonian Cup winners.)
3	Levadia Maardu (Note: Levadia Maardu changed their name to Levadia Tallinn in 2004.)	28	15	4	9	54	30	+24	49	Qualification for UEFA Cup first qualifying round
4	Narva Trans	28	14	5	9	58	43	+15	47	Qualification for Intertoto Cup first round
5	Tulevik	28	8	6	14	44	56	−12	30	
6	Levadia Tallinn (Note: Levadia Tallinn changed their name to Levadia II Tallinn in 2004.)	28	8	4	16	44	63	−19	28	
7	Valga	28	3	8	17	25	63	−38	17	Qualification for relegation play-offs
8	Kuressaare (R)	28	1	2	25	11	121	−110	5	Relegation to Esiliiga

Source: Estonian Football Association (in Estonian)
Rules for classification: 1) points; 2) number of wins; 3) head-to-head points; 4) head-to-head goal difference; 5) head-to-head goals scored; 6) goal difference; 7) number of goals scored.
(C) Champions; (R) Relegated

=== Esiliiga ===
Pos	Team	Pld	W	D	L	GF	GA	GD	Pts	Promotion or relegation
1	Lootus (C, P)	28	21	4	3	77	23	+54	67	Promotion to Meistriliiga
2	Tervis	28	16	5	7	69	36	+33	53	Qualification for promotion play-offs
3	M.C.	28	14	8	6	65	47	+18	50	
4	Estel	28	13	5	10	69	45	+24	44	
5	TJK	28	7	10	11	41	57	−16	31	
6	Merkuur (Note: FC Merkuur Tartu deducted 4 points for having licensing problem before the season.) (R)	28	7	8	13	37	66	−29	25	Qualification for relegation play-offs
7	Tammeka (R)	28	3	5	20	44	99	−55	14	Relegation to II Liiga
8	Vaprus (Note: Estonian Football Association License Commission decided to take JK Vaprus Pärnu's license to play in Esiliiga. The club was demoted to 8th spot.) (R)	28	5	7	16	42	71	−29	22	Relegation to II Liiga

Source: rsssf.com
Rules for classification: 1) points; 2) head-to-head points; 3) head-to-head goal difference; 4) head-to-head goals scored; 5) goal difference; 6) number of goals scored.
(C) Champions; (P) Promoted; (R) Relegated

== Estonian FA Cup ==
=== Final ===
27 May 2003

TVMK	2–2 (a.e.t.)	Flora
Smirnov 33'; Krõlov 78'		37' Stepanov; 70' Sirevicius
Penalties
Kurjanov (penalty scored); Kisseljov (penalty scored); Kostin (penalty scored); Krõlov (penalty scored)	4–1	(penalty missed) Zahovaiko; (penalty scored) Reim; (penalty missed) Kulik

Kadrioru staadion, Tallinn
Attendance: 1,200
Referee: Margus Kotter
