= 2001 in Estonian football =

- Meistriliiga champions
- FC Flora Tallinn
- Esiliiga champions
- FC Pärnu Levadia
- Estonian Cup winners
- FC Narva Trans
- Teams in Europe
- FC Flora Tallinn; TVMK Tallinn; FC Levadia Maardu; Levadia Tallinn
- Estonian national team
- 2002 FIFA World Cup qualification
- Estonian Footballer of the Year
- Indrek Zelinski

The 2001 season was the tenth full year of competitive football (soccer) in Estonia since gaining independence from the Soviet Union in 1991-08-20.

== National Leagues ==
=== Meistriliiga ===
Pos	Team	Pld	W	D	L	GF	GA	GD	Pts	Qualification or relegation
1	Flora (C)	28	21	5	2	62	18	+44	68	Qualification for Champions League first qualifying round
2	TVMK	28	16	8	4	77	30	+47	56	Qualification for UEFA Cup qualifying round
3	Maardu Levadia (Note: Club changed their name to Levadia Tallinn in 2004)	28	16	7	5	72	35	+37	55	Qualification for Intertoto Cup first round
4	Narva Trans	28	16	3	9	79	35	+44	51	
5	Tulevik	28	11	6	11	41	37	+4	39	
6	Tallinna Levadia (Note: Club changed their name to Levadia II Tallinn in 2004)	28	6	5	17	30	78	−48	23	Qualification for UEFA Cup qualifying round (Note: Qualified As Estonian Cup winners)
7	Lootus	28	4	5	19	21	53	−32	17	Qualification for relegation play-offs
8	Kuressaare (R)	28	2	1	25	18	114	−96	7	Relegation to Esiliiga

Source: Estonian Football Association (in Estonian)
Rules for classification: 1) points; 2) number of wins; 3) head-to-head points; 4) head-to-head goal difference; 5) head-to-head goals scored; 6) goal difference; 7) number of goals scored.
(C) Champions; (R) Relegated

=== Esiliiga ===
Pos	Team	Pld	W	D	L	GF	GA	GD	Pts	Promotion or relegation
1	Levadia Pärnu (P)	28	15	7	6	67	39	+28	52	Promotion to Meistriliiga
2	Valga	28	16	3	9	61	38	+23	51	Qualification for promotion play-offs
3	S.C. Real	28	14	5	9	65	47	+18	47	
4	Merkuur	28	14	4	10	57	35	+22	46	
5	Elva	28	12	6	10	64	33	+31	42	
6	Emmaste (R)	28	12	4	12	43	50	−7	40	Qualification for relegation play-offs
7	Sillamäe Kalev (R)	28	12	3	13	59	53	+6	39	Relegation to II Liiga
8	Tervis (R)	28	1	0	27	25	146	−121	3	Relegation to II Liiga

Source: rsssf.com
Rules for classification: 1) points; 2) head-to-head points; 3) head-to-head goal difference; 4) head-to-head goals scored; 5) goal difference; 6) number of goals scored.
(P) Promoted; (R) Relegated

== Estonian FA Cup ==
=== Final ===
24 May 2001

Narva Trans	1–0 (a.e.t.)	Flora
Kurotskin 111'

Valga linnastaadion, Valga
Attendance: 400
Referee: Hannes Kaasik
