= 1998 in Estonia =

- Decades: 1970s; 1980s; 1990s; 2000s; 2010s
- See also: Other events of 1998; Timeline of Estonian history

This article lists events that occurred during 1998 in Estonia.

== Incumbents ==
- President – Lennart Meri
- Prime Minister – Mart Siimann

== Events ==
- 16 January – presidents of Baltic states signed a USA-Baltic Charter of Partnership.
- 18 March – death penalty was abolished in Estonia.
- 8 April – the headquarters of BALTRON minesweeping squadron was opened in Tallinn.

== See also ==
- 1998 in Estonian football
- 1998 in Estonian television
