= Karl Plutus =

Estonian lawyer and centenarian

- Born: 11 September 1904; Kolu Manor, Governorate of Estonia, Russian Empire
- Died: 12 November 2010 (aged 106); Tallinn, Estonia
- Occupation: Former lawyer
- Spouse: Vera Aleksejeva (married 1929, died 1995)

Karl Plutus (11 September 1904 – 12 November 2010) was an Estonian jurist and the oldest verified living man in Estonia from 2006 to 2010.

Plutus was born in Kolu Manor, Virumaa. He spent his childhood in Eastern Estonia and Saint Petersburg, where his family had moved to in 1913, and witnessed the October Revolution. In 1921, his family returned to Estonia. During The Second World War he was in Soviet rear and was not sent to the front line. He studied law instead and became a jurist. He worked in this occupation until his retirement in 1992.

In his later years Plutus lived with his sister who was younger than him by eight years. His hobbies were fishing and dancing. He died on 12 November 2010 at age 106.
