= Viru Prison =

Prison in Estonia

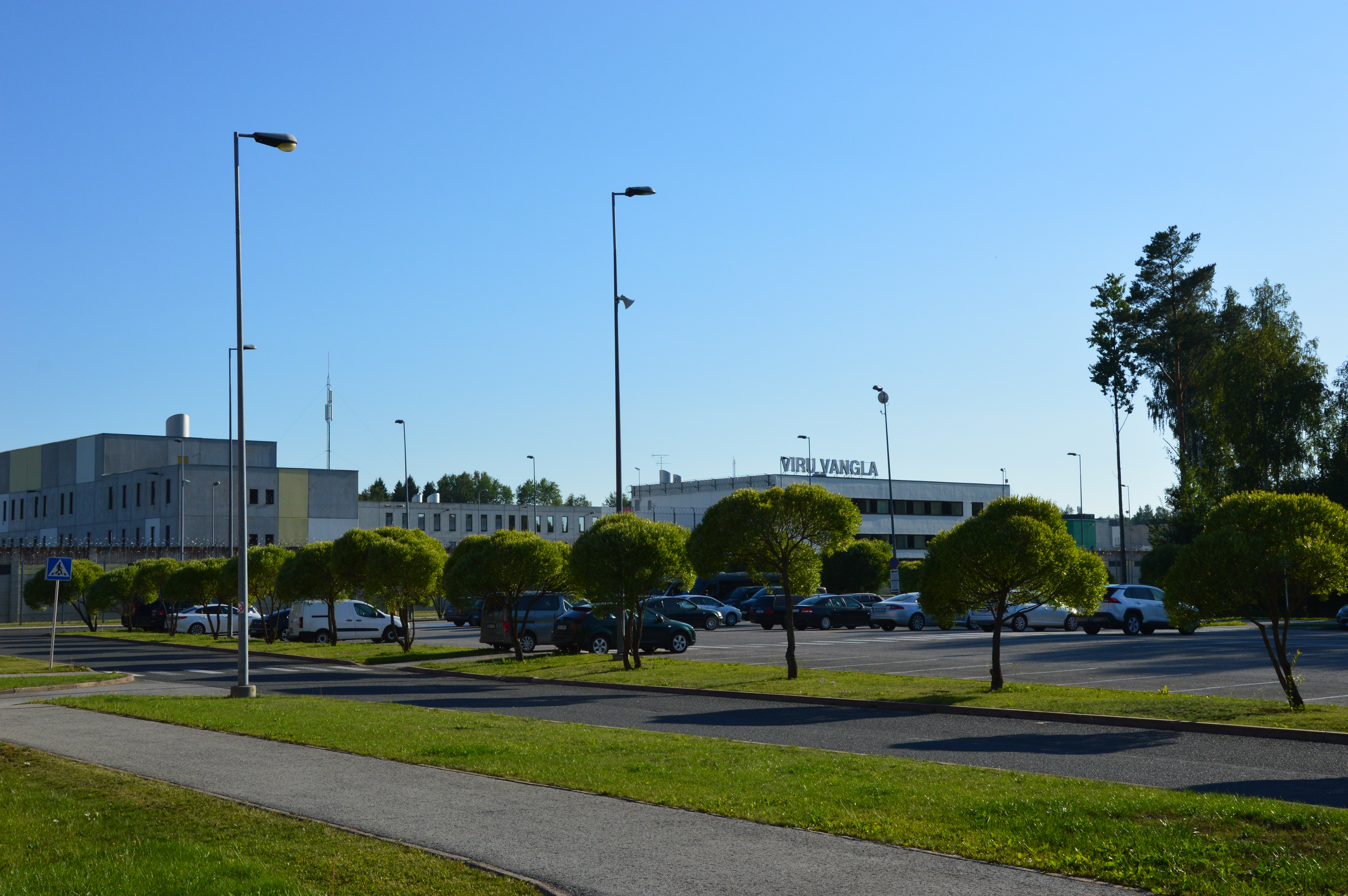
- Viru Prison
- Interactive map of Viru Prison
- Location: 59°21′26″N 27°27′28″E

Viru Prison (Estonian: Viru Vangla) is a regional prison in Jõhvi, Estonia.

Estonian Ministry of Justice started preparations for establishment of Viru Prison in 2001, and the prison was officially established on July 13, 2006.

Viru Prison complex incorporates 1000 closed beds and a 75-bed open unit operated by the Estonian Department of Prisons. A 150-bed house of detention, under the control of the national police, augments the prison facility. To gain the best security possible, all buildings are connected with upper-air gallery, leading from one building to another. A youth wing houses minors awaiting court appearances.

Due to an excess of prison space in Estonia, there were concerns about the viability of the prison in the future. In 2025, the Estonian justice minister reported Viru Prison would remain open, as "Society needs prison buildings".

== Gallery ==
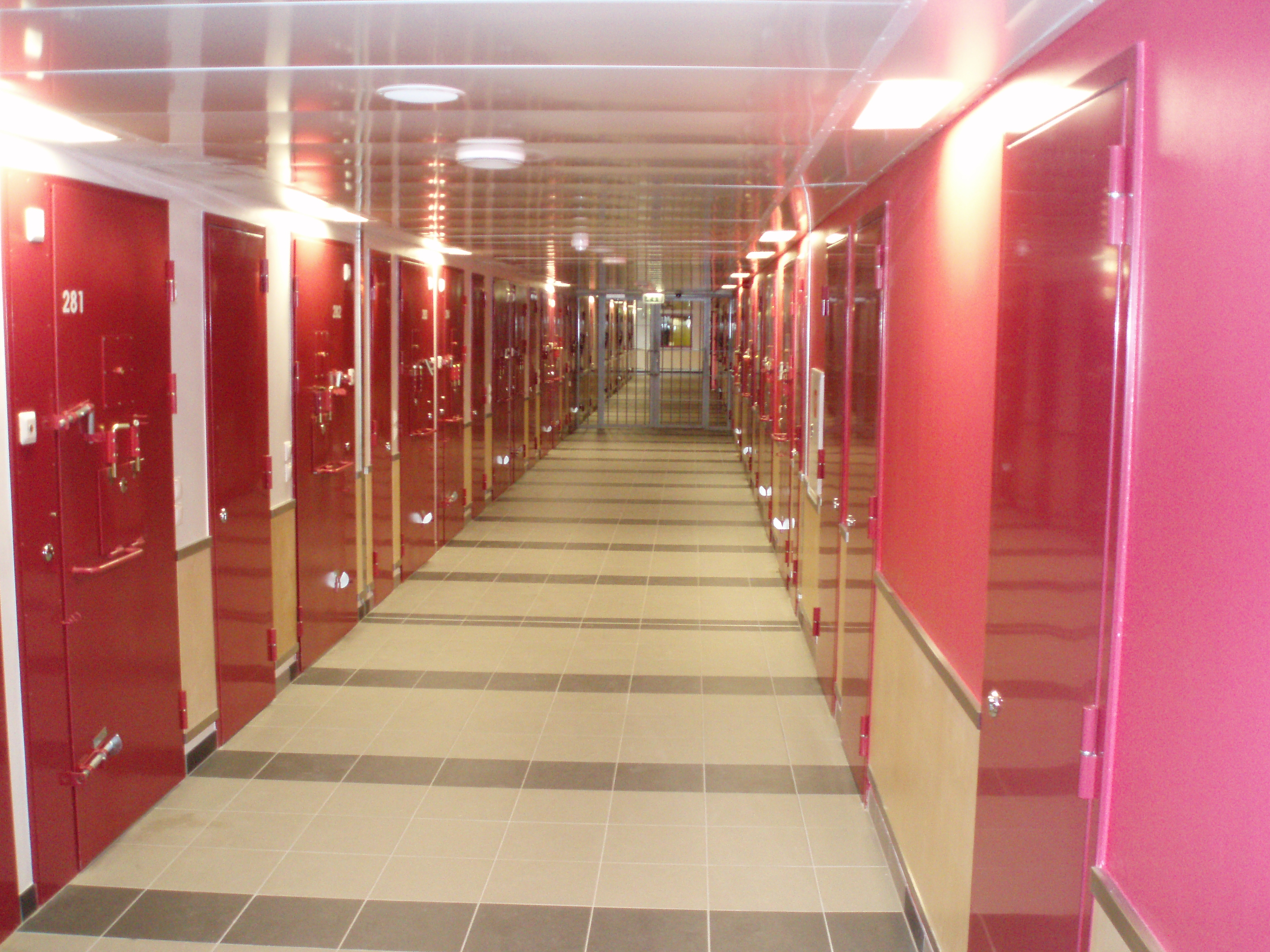

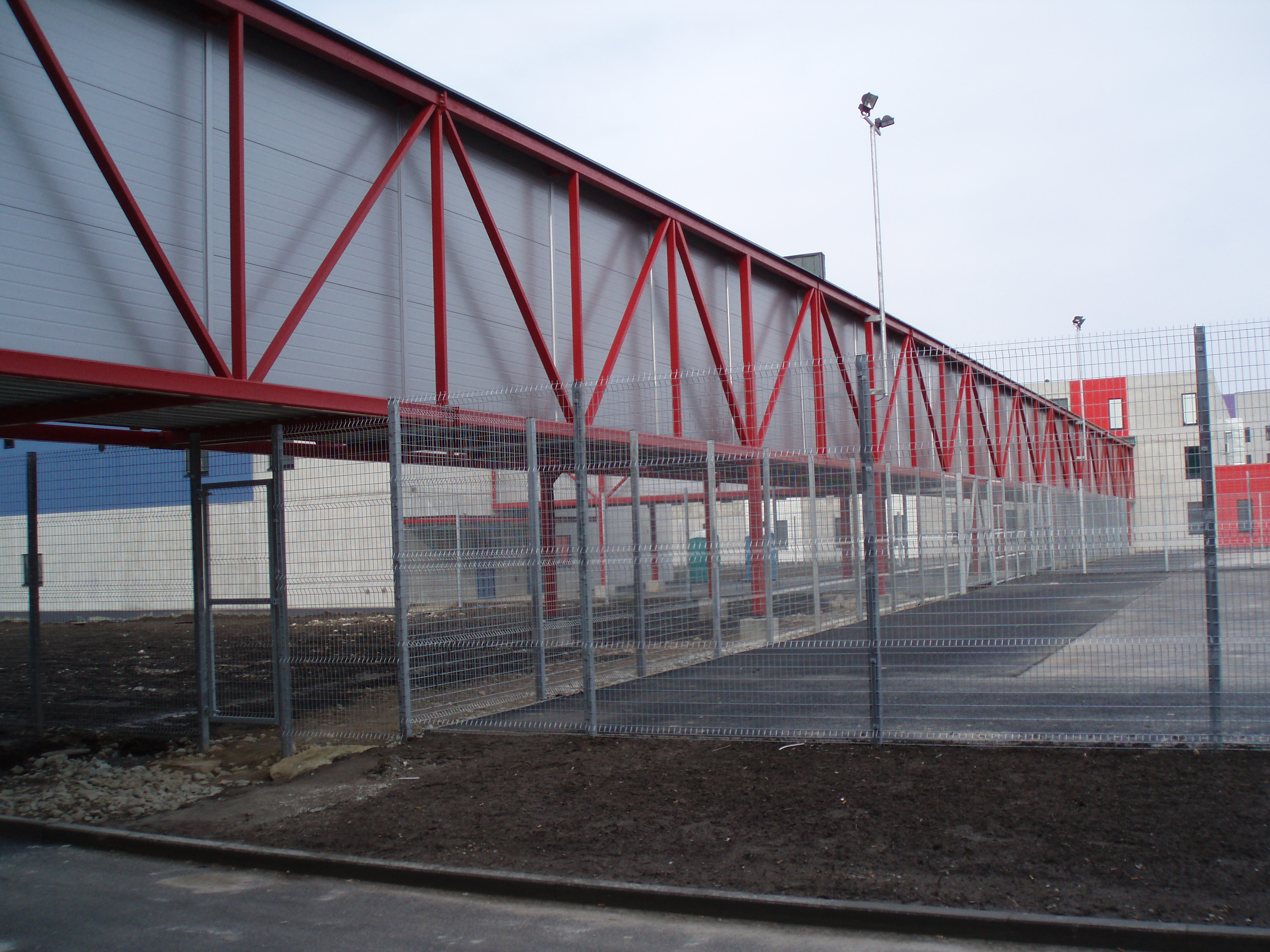
Upper-air gallery

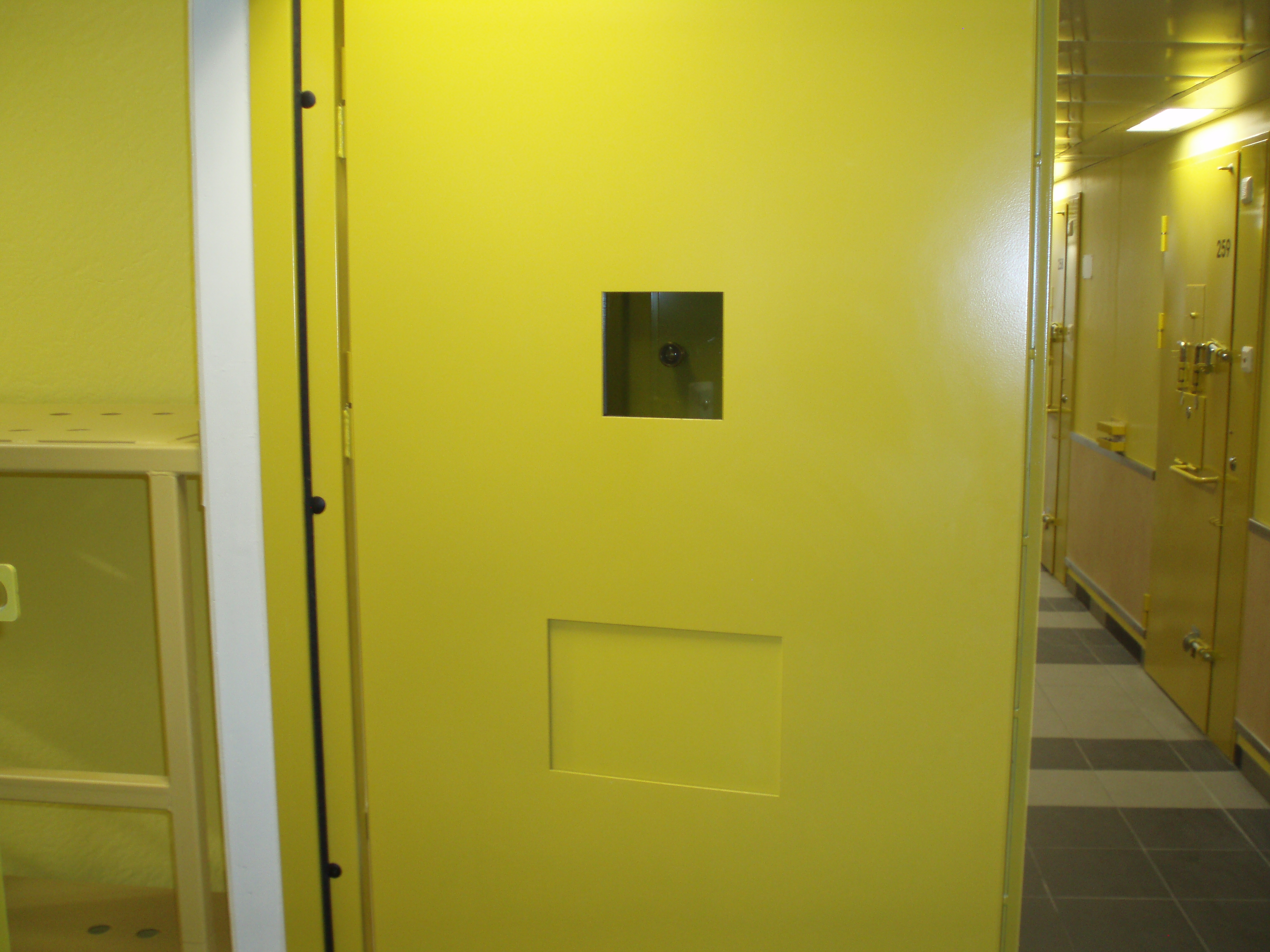

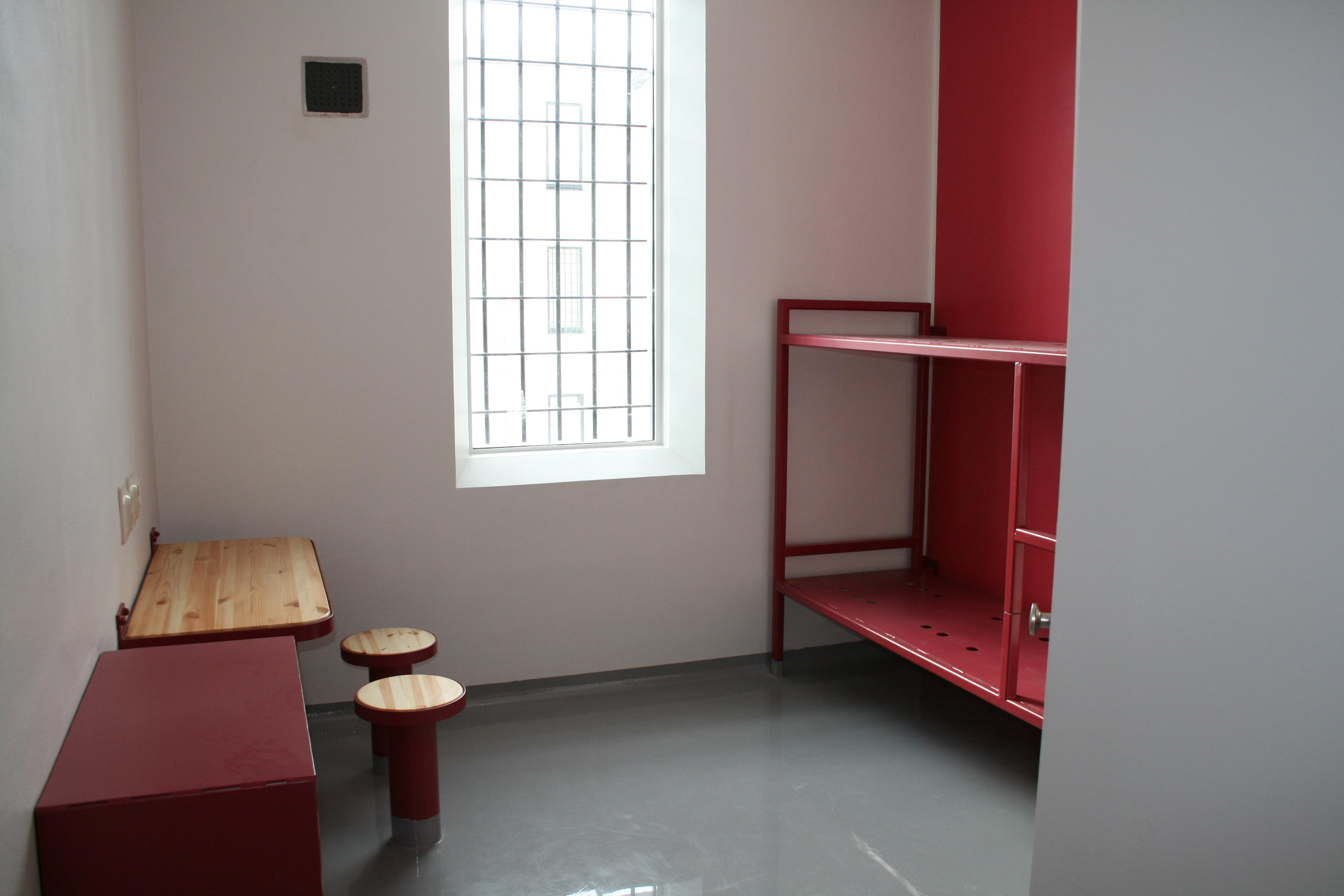
2-bed chamber
