= Click and Grow =

Estonian indoor gardening company

- Industry: Indoor gardening
- Founded: 2009
- Founder: Mattias Lepp
- Products: Smart Flowerpot, Smart Garden, Wall Farm
- Website: eu.clickandgrow.com

Click and Grow is an Estonian indoor gardening company, founded by Mattias Lepp in 2009. It develops consumer electronic products for growing edible plants indoors.

== History ==
Click and Grow was founded by Mattias Lepp, in Estonia, in 2009. In 2010, he won a local Ajujaht business idea competition with his idea for a 'Smart Flowerpot'. The idea took two years to develop before it was sold as a product.

As of 2018, Click and Grow employed 42 people, with offices in San Francisco, Tartu and Tallinn, and had more than 450,000 customers. In the same year the company received investment from INGKA Holding.

Between March and May 2020, during the COVID-19 pandemic, Click and Grow saw sales that were three to five times higher than normal. It was claimed that this was due to fresh food shortages and fear of them continuing, an effort to improve mental health, and in order to reduce food shopping frequency.

Between 2016 and 2023, Click and Grow received several research grants from the Estonian Ministry of Education and Research through the European Regional Development Fund. These projects included the development of biodegradable substrates, a new plant growth medium in cooperation with the University of Tartu (2020–2022, €281,173), and efficient LED lighting solutions for indoor cultivation devices (2022–2023, €59,453).

== Products ==
Click and Grow's products are self-irrigating and the system uses 'plant pods' that contain plant seeds, a growing medium and a controlled-release fertiliser.

=== Smart Flowerpot ===
The Smart Flowerpot was introduced in 2011, as a battery powered, indoor plant pot that did not require manual watering or fertilizing. By 2012 Click & Grow had sold 90,000 Smart Flowerpots. However, customers in Nordic countries found that they had insufficient natural sunlight to grow many varieties of plant.

=== Smart Herb Garden and Smart Garden 3 ===
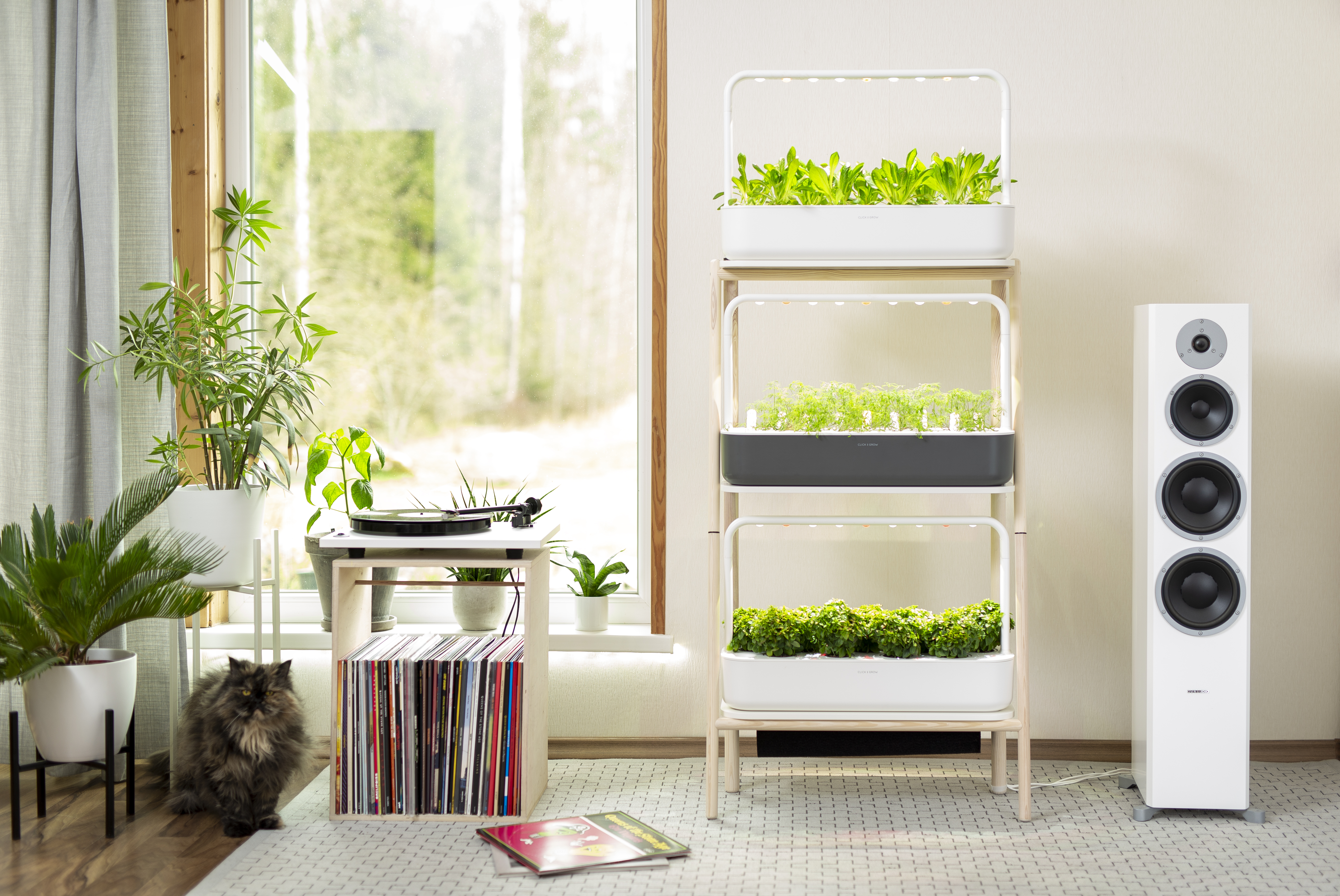
Click and Grow Smart Garden

In 2013, Click and Grow used Kickstarter to raise $625,000 for a Smart Herb Garden, which included an LED grow light, and could grow three plants at once. It began selling the Smart Herb Garden in January 2014. In 2017, a second generation of the garden was released called Smart Garden 3.

=== Smart Garden 9 and 27 ===
In 2016, Click and Grow launched a bigger version of the Smart Herb garden through another Kickstarter campaign - the Smart Garden 9, capable of growing nine plants at a time. The nine-plant unit is stacked using a three-tiered stand, to become a Smart Garden 27.

=== Smart Farm ===
In 2015, Click and Grow introduced a larger indoor plant growing product which can grow up to 250 plants.

=== Wall Farm ===
In 2016, Click and Grow launched the Wall Farm, which can grow up to 51 plants at a time.
