= 2003 in Estonia =

- Decades: 1980s; 1990s; 2000s; 2010s; 2020s
- See also: Other events of 2003; Timeline of Estonian history

This article lists events that occurred during 2003 in Estonia.

== Incumbents ==
- President – Arnold Rüütel
- Prime Minister – Siim Kallas (until 10 April); Juhan Parts (starting 10 April)

== Events ==
- March – elections for X Riigikogu took place.
- 21 April – the primary radar for airspace control was opened (part of BALTNET).

== See also ==
- 2003 in Estonian football
- 2003 in Estonian television
