= 2004 in Estonia =

- Decades: 1980s; 1990s; 2000s; 2010s; 2020s
- See also: Other events of 2004; Timeline of Estonian history

This article lists events that occurred during 2004 in Estonia.

== Incumbents ==
- President – Arnold Rüütel
- Prime Minister – Juhan Parts

== Events ==
- 29 March – Estonia joined with NATO.
- 1 May – Estonia joined with the European Union.

== Deaths ==
- 24 April – Lia Laats, actress (b. 1926)

== See also ==
- 2004 in Estonian football
- 2004 in Estonian television
