= Waldhof (factory) =

Technology company based in Estonia

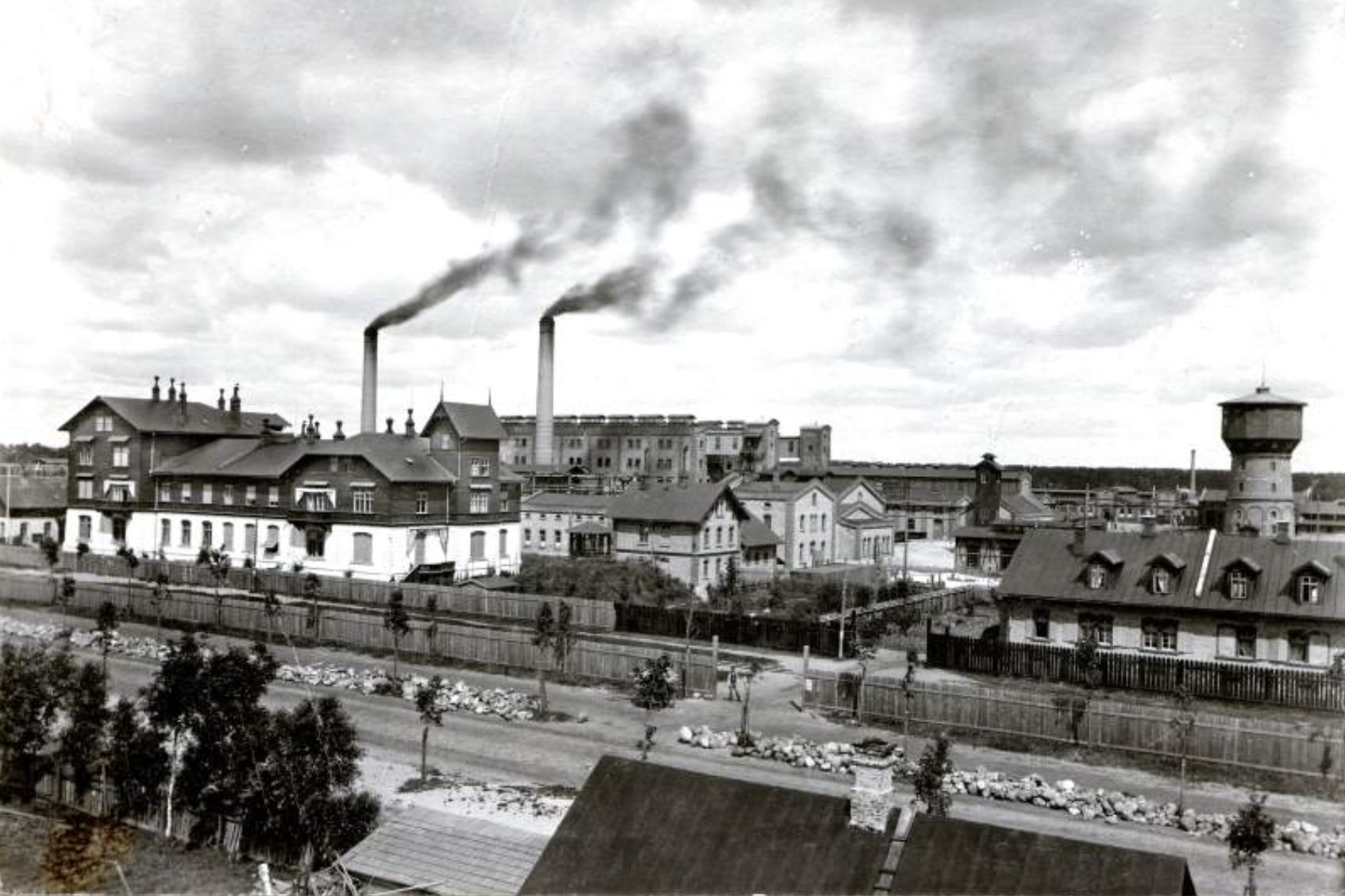
Waldhof in 1904

Waldhof was a cellulose factory in Pärnu, Estonia. The factory existed from 1899 to 1915. The factory belonged to the Russian company "Waldhof" (this company, in turn, was subordinated to German concern "Waldhof").

The factory was established in 1899.

In 1913, about 2000 workers worked on behalf of the factory. The company's annual production was about 80,000 tons of cellulose; of which, about 30% went to external market (England, Belgium, USA etc.).

In 1915, the factory was closed. On 20 August 1915, the factory's building was destroyed.
