= Tiit =

Male given name and surname

- Gender: Male
- Language: Estonian
- Name day: 18 September

Origin
- Origin: Old High German
- Region of origin: Estonia

Other names
- Related names: Tiidrik, Tiido, Tiidu

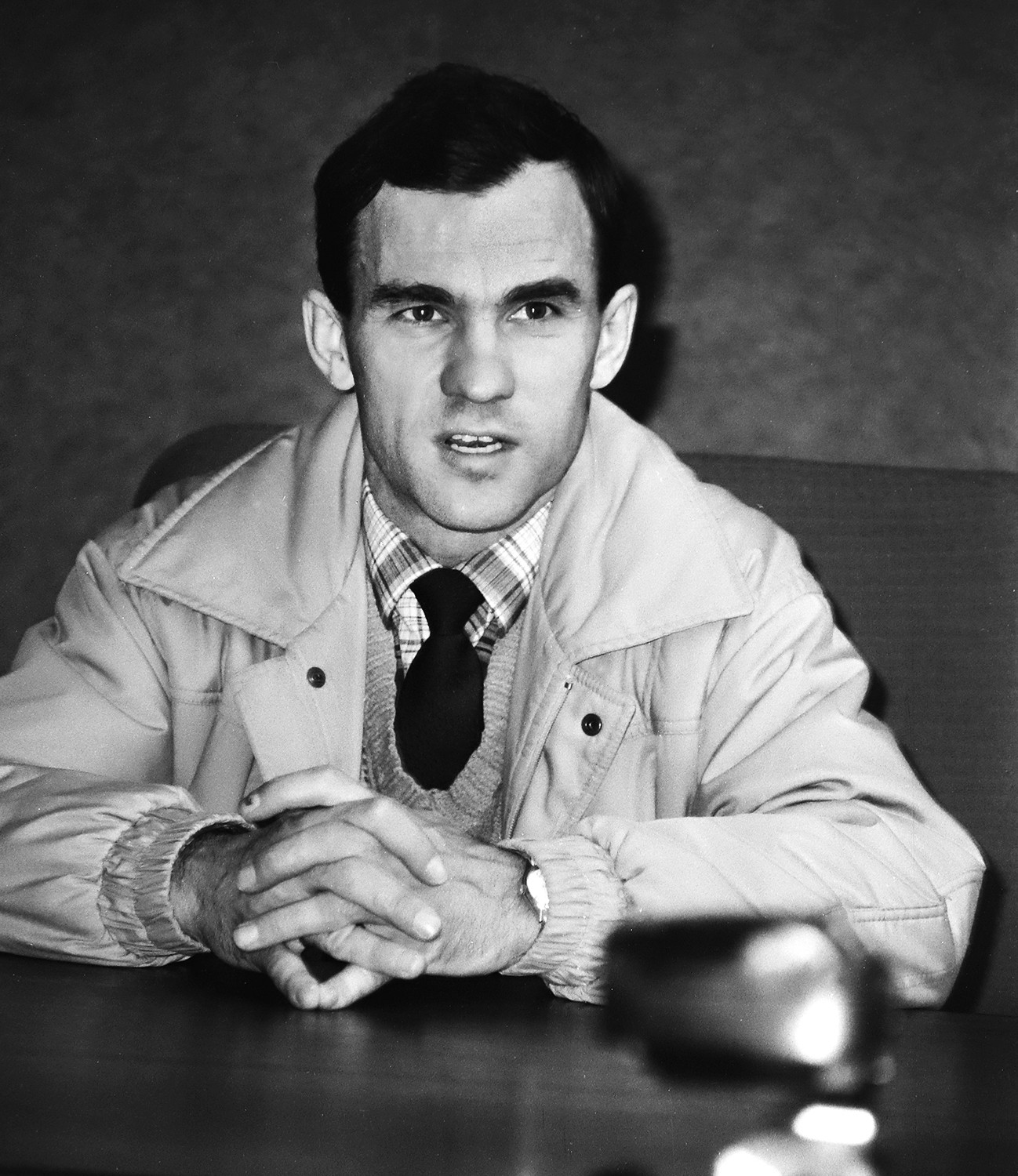
Estonian entrepreneur Tiit Järvekülg

Tiit is predominantly an Estonian masculine given name and occurs, to a lesser extent, as a surname.

Given name

- Tiit Arge (born 1963), politician
- Tiit Haagma (1954–2021), ice yacht sailor and musician (Ruja)
- Tiit Härm (1946–2025), ballet dancer, ballet master and choreographer
- Tiit Helimets (born 1977), ballet dancer
- Tiit Helmja (born 1945), rower
- Tiit Hennoste (born 1953), linguist
- Tiit Käbin (1937–2011), jurist and politician
- Tiit Kala (born 1954), politician
- Tiit Kaljundi (1946–2008), architect
- Tiit Kändler (born 1948), humorist and science journalist
- Tiit Kuningas (born 1949), sports journalist
- Tiit Kuusik (1911–1990), opera singer
- Tiit Kuusmik (born 1950), politician
- Tiit Lääne (born 1958), sportsman, sports journalist and politician
- Tiit Land (born 1964), biochemist
- Tiit Lilleorg (1941–2021), actor
- Tiit Made (born 1940), economist, journalist, publicist and politician
- Tiit Madisson (1950–2021), dissident, writer and politician
- Tiit Niilo (born 1962), politician
- Tiit Nuudi (born 1949), tennis player and politician
- Tiit Ojasoo (born 1977), theatre director, stage pedagogue and academic
- Tiit Pääsuke (born 1941), painter
- Tiit Rosenberg (born 1946), historian
- Tiit Salumäe (born 1951), Lutheran prelate
- Tiit Sinissaar (born 1947), politician
- Tiit Sokk (born 1964), basketball player
- Tiit Sukk (born 1974), actor, television presenter, and director
- Tiit Tamm (born 1952), ski jumper and coach
- Tiit Tammsaar (born 1951), politician
- Tiit Terik (born 1979), politician
- Tiit Tikerpe (born 1965), sprint canoer and Olympic competitor
- Tiit Toomsalu (born 1949), politician
- Tiit Trummal (born 1954), architect
- Tiit Vähi (born 1947), politician and former Prime Minister of Estonia
- Tiit-Rein Viitso (1938–2022), linguist

Surname

- Ene-Margit Tiit (born 1934), Estonian mathematician and statistician
- Valdur Tiit (1931–2019), Estonian physicist
