= 1937 in Estonia =

- Decades: 1910s; 1920s; 1930s; 1940s; 1950s
- See also: Other events of 1937; Timeline of Estonian history

This article lists events that occurred during 1937 in Estonia.

== Incumbents ==
- Prime Minister – Konstantin Päts

== Events ==
- 29 July – a new constitution in force with civil liberties and democracy restored but with a very strong presidency.

== Births ==
- 8 April – Maila Rästas, actress (d. 2008)
- 4 September – Mikk Mikiver, actor and theatre director (d. 2006)
- 13 September – Meeli Sööt, actress
- 21 September – Aarne Üksküla, actor and theatre instructor (d. 2017)

== Deaths ==
- 11 June – Hando Mugasto, Estonian graphic designer
