= Eesti tippmodell season 3 =

Season of television series

Eesti tippmodell
- Season 3

Release
- Original network: Kanal 2
- Original release: 4 December 2014 – 12 March 2015

Season chronology
- ← Previous; Season 2 Next → Season 4

Eesti tippmodell, season 3 is the third installment of the Estonian adaptation of America's Next Top Model founded by Tyra Banks. The judges for this season are Urmas Väljaots, Thomas Volkmann, and Liisi Eesmaa, who also serves as the show's host. This was the first season of the show to feature males within the final cast. The season began to air on 4 December 2014.

The winner of the competition was 16-year-old Aule Õun from Karksi-Nuia. As her prizes she received an all expenses paid trip to France to meet with Major model management in Paris. She was also signed with a model school managed by Paolo Moglia. Furthermore, she won the chance of being featured in the April issue of Redbook Magazine as well as making an appearance on the cover of Cosmopolitan.

== Episode summaries ==
=== Episode 1 ===
Original Air Date: 4 December 2014

Casting episode.

- Featured photographer: Oliver Moosus

=== Episode 2 ===
Original Air Date: 11 December 2014

- First call-out: Liise Hanni
- Bottom two: Hanna-Maria Sell & Kristina Trees
- Eliminated: Hanna-Maria Sell
- Featured photographer: James Holm

=== Episode 3 ===
Original Air Date: 18 December 2014

- First call-out: Mona Kattel
- Bottom two: Kristina Trees & Stefani Kask
- Eliminated: Kristina Trees
- Featured photographer: Kristiin Kõosalu

=== Episode 4 ===
Original Air Date: 8 January 2015

- First call-out: Hendrik Adler
- Bottom two: Mona Kattel & Sandro Pullakbutu
- Eliminated: Mona Kattel
- Featured photographer: Kristjan Lepp

=== Episode 5 ===
Original Air Date: 15 January 2015

- First call-out: Jekaterina Bulgarina
- Bottom two: Hristina Parimskaja & Kevin Sarapuu
- Eliminated: Hristina Parimskaja
- Featured photographer: Krõõt Tarkmeel

=== Episode 6 ===
Original Air Date: 22 January 2015

- First call-out: Jekaterina Bulgarina
- Bottom two: Aule Õun & Gerili Narusing
- Eliminated: None
- Featured photographer: Erik Riikoja

=== Episode 7 ===
Original Air Date: 29 January 2015

- First call-out: Hendrik Adler
- Bottom two: Liise Hanni & Stefani Kask
- Eliminated: Stefani Kask
- Featured photographer: Kirill Gvozdev

=== Episode 8 ===
Original Air Date: 5 February 2015

- First call-out: Liise Hanni
- Bottom two: Hendrik Adler & Kevin Sarapuu
- Eliminated: Kevin Sarapuu
- Featured photographer: Kalle Veesaar

=== Episode 9 ===
Original Air Date: 12 February 2015

- First call-out: Jekaterina Bulgarina
- Bottom two: Liise Hanni & Sandro Pullakbutu
- Eliminated: None
- Featured photographer: Toomas Volkmann

=== Episode 10 ===
Original Air Date: 19 February 2015

- First call-out: None
- Bottom two: None
- Eliminated: None
- Featured photographer: Alessio Migliardi

=== Episode 11 ===
Original Air Date: 26 February 2015

- First call-out: Gerili Narusing
- Bottom two: Aule Õun & Sandro Pullakbutu
- Eliminated: Sandro Pullakbutu
- Featured photographers: Anu Hammer & Aivo Kallas

=== Episode 12 ===
Original Air Date: 5 March 2015

- First call-out: Jekaterina Bulgarina
- Bottom two: Gerili Narusing & Liise Hanni
- Eliminated: Gerili Narusing
- Featured photographers: Egert Kamenik & Oliver Moosus

=== Episode 13 ===
Original Air Date: 5 March 2015

Recap episode.

=== Episode 14 ===
Original Air Date: 12 March 2015

- Final four: Aule Õun, Hendrik Adler, Jekaterina Bulgarina & Liise Hanni
- Estonia's Next Top Model: Aule Õun

== Contestants ==
(ages are stated at start of contest)

Contestant	Age	Hometown	Height	Finish	Place
Hanna-Maria Sell †	16	Haapsalu	1.75 m (5 ft 9 in)	Episode 2	12
Kristina Trees	16	Hummuli	1.74 m (5 ft 8 1/2 in)	Episode 3	11
Mona Kattel	19	Paide	1.70 m (5 ft 7 in)	Episode 4	10
Hristina Parimskaja	17	Põlvamaa	1.72 m (5 ft 7 1/2 in)	Episode 5	9
Stefani Kask	20	Tallinn	1.70 m (5 ft 7 in)	Episode 7	8
Kevin Sarapuu	18	Tallinn	1.87 m (6 ft 1 1/2 in)	Episode 8	7
Sandro Pullakbutu	22	Tartu	1.82 m (5 ft 11 1/2 in)	Episode 11	6
Gerili Narusing	18	Karksi-Nuia	1.75 m (5 ft 9 in)	Episode 12	5
Liise Hanni	16	Pärnu	1.78 m (5 ft 10 in)	Episode 14	4–2
Jekaterina Bulgarina	21	Tallinn	1.77 m (5 ft 9 1/2 in)	Episode 14	4–2
Hendrik Adler	24	Saaremaa	1.86 m (6 ft 1 in)	Episode 14	4–2
Aule Õun	16	Karksi-Nuia	1.74 m (5 ft 8 1/2 in)	Episode 14	1

== Summaries ==
=== Call-out order ===
Order	Episodes										
Order	2	3	4	5	6	7	8	9	11	12	14
1	Liise	Mona	Hendrik	Jekaterina	Jekaterina	Hendrik	Liise	Jekaterina	Gerili	Jekaterina	Aule
2	Mona	Kevin	Liise	Sandro	Liise	Jekaterina	Jekaterina	Hendrik	Jekaterina	Aule	Hendrik; Jekaterina; Liise
3	Sandro	Hristina	Stefani	Gerili	Hendrik	Gerili	Gerili	Aule	Hendrik	Hendrik	Hendrik; Jekaterina; Liise
4	Hendrik	Hendrik	Aule	Aule	Kevin	Aule	Sandro	Gerili	Liise	Liise	Hendrik; Jekaterina; Liise
5	Jekaterina	Liise	Gerili	Liise	Sandro	Sandro	Aule	Liise; Sandro	Aule	Gerili	
6	Kevin	Aule	Hristina	Hendrik	Stefani	Kevin	Hendrik	Liise; Sandro	Sandro		
7	Hristina	Sandro	Kevin	Stefani	Aule; Gerili	Liise	Kevin				
8	Stefani	Jekaterina	Jekaterina	Kevin	Aule; Gerili	Stefani					
9	Gerili	Gerili	Sandro	Hristina							
10	Aule	Stefani	Mona								
11	Kristina	Kristina									
12	Hanna-Maria										

The contestant was eliminated
The contestant was in a non-elimination bottom two
The contestant won the competition

- Episode 1 was the casting episode.
- Episode 6 featured a non-elimination bottom two.
- In episode 9, Liise and Sandro landed in the bottom two. The judges chose not to eliminate them. Instead, they missed out on the trip overseas the following episode as a punishment.
- In episode 10, no panel was held. Only the Milan fashion show and Magnum shoot took place that week.
- Episode 13 was the recap episode.

=== Photo shoot guide ===
- Episode 1 photo shoot: Grouped with dogs in B&W (casting)
- Episode 2 photo shoot: Posing with an Opel race car
- Episode 3 photo shoot: Modeling with toddlers
- Episode 4 photo shoot: 60s fashion with a vintage mustang
- Episode 5 photo shoot: Christmas Eve in pairs
- Episode 6 photo shoot: Selling shoes on an iceberg
- Episode 7 photo shoot: Twofold optical illusion
- Episode 8 photo shoot: Roccoco renaissance fashion
- Episode 9 photo shoot: Fashion accessories in B&W
- Episode 10 photo shoot: Magnum ice cream campaign
- Episode 11 photo shoots: Geishas & Taikomochi covered in milk; Cosmopolitan editorial
- Episode 12 photo shoots: Underwater fabric; portraying celebrities
- Episode 14 photo shoot: Cosmopolitan covers
