= Eesti tippmodell season 4 =

Season of television series

Eesti tippmodell
- Season 4

Release
- Original network: Kanal 2
- Original release: December 14, 2015 – February 29, 2016

Season chronology
- ← Previous; Season 3

Eesti tippmodell, season 4 was the fourth installment of the Estonian adaptation of America's Next Top Model founded by Tyra Banks. The judges for this season were Mari-Liis Helvik, Toomas Volkmann, and Liisi Eesmaa, who also served as the show's host. As in the previous season, males were featured in the cast. The season aired from December 2015 to February 2016. The restrictions in height and measurement were less strict as in previous cycles.

The winner of the competition was 22-year-old Kätlin Hallik from Tallinn. As her prizes, she received a brand new Toyota Avensis, a supply of Kallos cosmetics, a position as the face of Dormeo.

== Episode summaries ==
=== Episode 1 ===
Original Airdate: December 14, 2015

- Immune from elimination: Maria Bountiy
- Bottom two: Alice Filips & Taavet Suurmõts
- Eliminated: None
- Featured photographer: Kirill Gvozdev
- Special guest: Stefani Kask

=== Episode 2 ===
Original Airdate: December 21, 2015

- Challenge winner: Evelina Säkk
- Eliminated: Maria Bountiy
- Entered: Antonio Kass
- Featured photographer: Viktor Koshkin
- Special guest: Gerili Narusing

=== Episode 3 ===
Original Airdate: December 28, 2015

- Challenge winners: Kätlin Hallik & Evelina Säkk
- Immune from elimination: Kristjan Sõrg
- Disqualified: Diana Haprova
- Featured photographer: Oliver Moosus

=== Episode 4 ===
Original Airdate: January 4, 2016

- Challenge winner: Helena Pertens
- Immune from elimination: Helena Pertens
- Bottom two: Liina Ilves & Taavet Suurmõts
- Eliminated: Liina Ilves & Taavet Suurmõts
- Featured photographer: Toomas Volkmann

=== Episode 5 ===
Original Airdate: January 11, 2016

- Challenge winner: None
- Immune from elimination: Kätlin Hallik
- Bottom three: Evelina Säkk, Rait Nöör & Joosep Padu
- Eliminated: Joosep Padu
- Featured photographer: Sandra Palm

=== Episode 6 ===
Original Airdate: January 18, 2016

- Challenge winner: Anastassia Bubnilkina
- Immune from elimination: Alice Philips
- Originally eliminated: Rait Nöör

=== Episode 7 ===
Original Airdate: January 25, 2016

- Immune from elimination: Antonio Kass
- Bottom two: Alice Philips & Anastassia Bubnilkina
- Eliminated: None
- Immune from elimination: Kätlin Hallik
- Bottom two: Helena Pertens & Kristjan Sõrg
- Eliminated: Kristjan Sõrg

=== Episode 8 ===
Original Airdate: February 1, 2016

- Immune from elimination: Anastassia Bubnilkina & German Pinelis
- Eliminated outside of judging panel: Alice Philips & Rait Nöör
- Featured photographer: Erlend Štaub

=== Episode 9 ===
Original Airdate: February 8, 2016

- Challenge winners: Antonio Kass & German Pinelis
- Immune from elimination: Kätlin Hallik
- Eliminated: Helena Pertens

=== Episode 10 ===
Original Airdate: February 15, 2016

- Bottom three: Anastassia Bubnilkina, Evelina Säkk & German Pinelis
- Eliminated: Anastassia Bubnilkina

=== Episode 11 ===
Original Airdate: February 22, 2016

- Eliminated: None

=== Episode 12 ===
Original Airdate: February 29, 2016

- Final four: Antonio Kass, Evelina Säkk, German Pinelis & Kätlin Hallik
- Third runner-up: Antonio Kass
- Second runner-up: Evelina Säkk
- Runner-up: German Pinelis
- Estonia's Next Top Model: Kätlin Hallik

== Contestants ==
(ages are stated at start of contest)

Contestant	Age	Height	Hometown	Finish	Place
Maria Bountiy	19	1.71 m (5 ft 7 1/2 in)	Tallinn	Episode 2	14
Diana Haprova	26	1.69 m (5 ft 6 1/2 in)	Tallinn	Episode 3	13 (DQ)
Taavet Suurmõts	22	1.93 m (6 ft 4 in)	Räpina	Episode 4	12–11
Liina Ilves	24	1.65 m (5 ft 5 in)	Tallinn	Episode 4	12–11
Joosep Padu	22	1.82 m (5 ft 11 1/2 in)	Läänemaa	Episode 5	10
Kristjan Sõrg	23	1.75 m (5 ft 9 in)	Tallinn	Episode 7	9
Rait Nöör	19	1.87 m (6 ft 1 1/2 in)	Viljandi	Episode 8	8–7
Alisa 'Alice' Philips	19	1.80 m (5 ft 11 in)	Tallinn	Episode 8	8–7
Helena Pertens	20	1.73 m (5 ft 8 in)	Tallinn	Episode 9	6
Anastassia Bubnilkina	21	1.64 m (5 ft 4 1/2 in)	Kiviõli	Episode 10	5
Antonio Kass	18	1.85 m (6 ft 1 in)	Tallinn	Episode 12	4
Evelina Säkk	21	1.72 m (5 ft 7 1/2 in)	Narva	Episode 12	3
German Pinelis	19	1.78 m (5 ft 10 in)	Pärnu	Episode 12	2
Kätlin Hallik	22	1.70 m (5 ft 7 in)	Tallinn	Episode 12	1

== Summaries ==
=== Elimination table ===
Place	Model	Episodes													
Place	Model	1		2	3	4	5	6	7		8	9	10	11	12
1	Kätlin	8th	SAFE	SAFE	SAFE	SAFE	IMM	SAFE	IMM	IMM	SAFE	IMM	SAFE	SAFE	Winner
2	German	5th	SAFE	SAFE	SAFE	SAFE	SAFE	SAFE	SAFE	SAFE	IMM	SAFE	LOW	SAFE	OUT
3	Evelina	12th/13th	SAFE	IMM	SAFE	SAFE	LOW	SAFE	SAFE	SAFE	SAFE	SAFE	LOW	SAFE	OUT
4	Antonio				SAFE	SAFE	SAFE	SAFE	IMM	IMM	SAFE	SAFE	SAFE	SAFE	OUT
5	Anastassia	3rd	SAFE	SAFE	SAFE	SAFE	SAFE	IMM	LOW	SAFE	IMM	SAFE	OUT		
6	Helena	4th	SAFE	SAFE	SAFE	IMM	SAFE	SAFE	SAFE	LOW	SAFE	OUT			
7/8	Alice	2nd	LOW	SAFE	SAFE	SAFE	SAFE	IMM	LOW	SAFE	OUT				
7/8	Rait	1st	SAFE	SAFE	SAFE	SAFE	LOW	LOW	SAFE	SAFE	OUT				
9	Kristjan	9th	SAFE	SAFE	IMM	SAFE	SAFE	SAFE	SAFE	OUT					
10	Joosep	7th	SAFE	SAFE	SAFE	SAFE	OUT								
11/12	Liina	12th/13th	SAFE	SAFE	SAFE	OUT									
11/12	Taavet	6th	LOW	SAFE	SAFE	OUT									
13	Diana	11th	SAFE	SAFE	DQ										
14	Maria	10th	IMM	OUT											

The contestant was part of a collective call out with another contestant
The contestant was immune from elimination
The contestant was at risk of elimination
The contestant was eliminated
The contestant was disqualified from the competition
The contestant was originally eliminated from the competition but was saved
The contestant was eliminated outside of judging panel
The contestant won the competition

- With the exception of casting in episode 1, no call-out was held during eliminations.
- In episode 1, Maria was immune from elimination for having performed the best on set. During elimination, Alice and Taveet were singled out as the bottom two for having performed the worst during the runway challenge, but neither of them were eliminated.
- In episode 2, Evelina was immune from elimination for winning the video challenge. Antonio entered the competition as a wildcard contestant the following episode.
- In episode 3, Kristjan was immune from elimination for having the best overall performance, while Diana was disqualified from the competition for communicating with her family and disclosing the location of the photo shoots during filming.
- In episode 4, Helena was immune from elimination for winning the challenge. Liina and Taavet were singled out as the bottom two, and both were eliminated from the competition.
- In episode 5, Kätlin was immune from elimination for her overall best performance. Evelina, Joosep and Rait were singled out as the bottom three, and Joosep was eliminated from the competition.
- In episode 6, Alice and Anastassia were immune from elimination for her overall best performance. Rait was originally eliminated, but was saved because it was his birthday.
- In episode 7, There were two separate immunities and bottom twos. Kätlin and Antonio were immune from both of them.
  - In the first elimination, Anastassia and Alice were chosen as the bottom two, but neither of them was eliminated.
  - In the second elimination, Helena and Kristjan were chosen as the bottom two, and Kristjan was eliminated.
- In episode 8, Anastassia and German were immune from elimination for their overall best performance. Alice and Rait were both eliminated outside the judging panel. No one else was eliminated that week.

=== Photo shoot guide ===
- Episode 1 photo shoot: Campaign for sunglasses in pairs
- Episode 2 photo shoot: Condom campaign in pairs
- Episode 3 photo shoot: Living sculptures in a sauna
- Episode 4 photo shoot: Goldtime Jewelry in pairs
- Episode 5 photo shoot: Posing with farm animals
- Episode 6 photo shoot: Posing with a car
- Episode 7 photo shoot: 20's glamour for Expressions
- Episode 8 photo shoot: Wedding couples
- Episode 9 photo shoot: B&W beauty shots
- Episode 10 photo shoots: Japanese manga in Liisi Eesmaa designs; Fazer Tutti Frutti with parrots
- Episode 11 photo shoots: Selling various products; Magnum ice cream campaign
