= 1934 in Estonia =

- Decades: 1910s; 1920s; 1930s; 1940s; 1950s
- See also: Other events of 1934; Timeline of Estonian history

This article lists events that occurred during 1934 in Estonia.

== Incumbents ==
- Prime Minister – Konstantin Päts

== Events ==
- 24 January – new constitution in effect.
- 12 March – Konstantin Päts with the help of General Johan Laidoner set up a virtual dictatorship. Parliament was prorogued and political parties were banned. Many members of the Vaps Movement were arrested.

== Births ==
- 22 April – Ene-Margit Tiit, Estonian statistician
