= 1924 in Estonia =

- Decades: 1900s; 1910s; 1920s; 1930s; 1940s
- See also: Other events of 1924; Timeline of Estonian history

This article lists events that occurred during 1924 in Estonia.

== Events ==
- Tallinn Jewish School was established.
- 1 December – Estonian coup d'état attempt.

== Births ==
- 17 October – Ülo Sooster, Estonian painter
