= 1925 in Estonia =

- Decades: 1900s; 1910s; 1920s; 1930s; 1940s
- See also: Other events of 1925; Timeline of Estonian history

This article lists events that occurred during 1925 in Estonia.

== Events ==
- First electric tram begins operating on Narva Road in Tallinn.
- Estonian Chamber of Commerce and Industry founded.
