= Kuningas =

Family name

Kuningas is an Estonian and Finnish surname, meaning king in both Estonian and Finnish.

== Geographical distribution ==
As of 2014, 60.7% of all known bearers of the surname Kuningas were residents of Estonia (frequency 1:2,714), 28.9% of Finland (1:23,693), 4.5% of the United States (1:10,034,758), 1.7% of Sweden (1:703,340) and 1.0% of Russia (1:18,036,396).

In Finland, the frequency of the surname was higher than national average (1:23,693) in the following regions:

1. South Karelia (1:2,214)
2. Kymenlaakso (1:8,138)
3. North Karelia (1:14,334)
4. Päijänne Tavastia (1:19,494)
5. Uusimaa (1:21,055)

== People ==
- Helle Kuningas (1949–2014), Estonian actress
- Merike Rõtova (born 1936), née Kuningas, Estonian chess player
- Mikko Kuningas (born 1997), Finnish professional footballer
- Tiit Kuningas (born 1949), Estonian sports journalist
