= Ines Aru =

Estonian actress (born 1939)

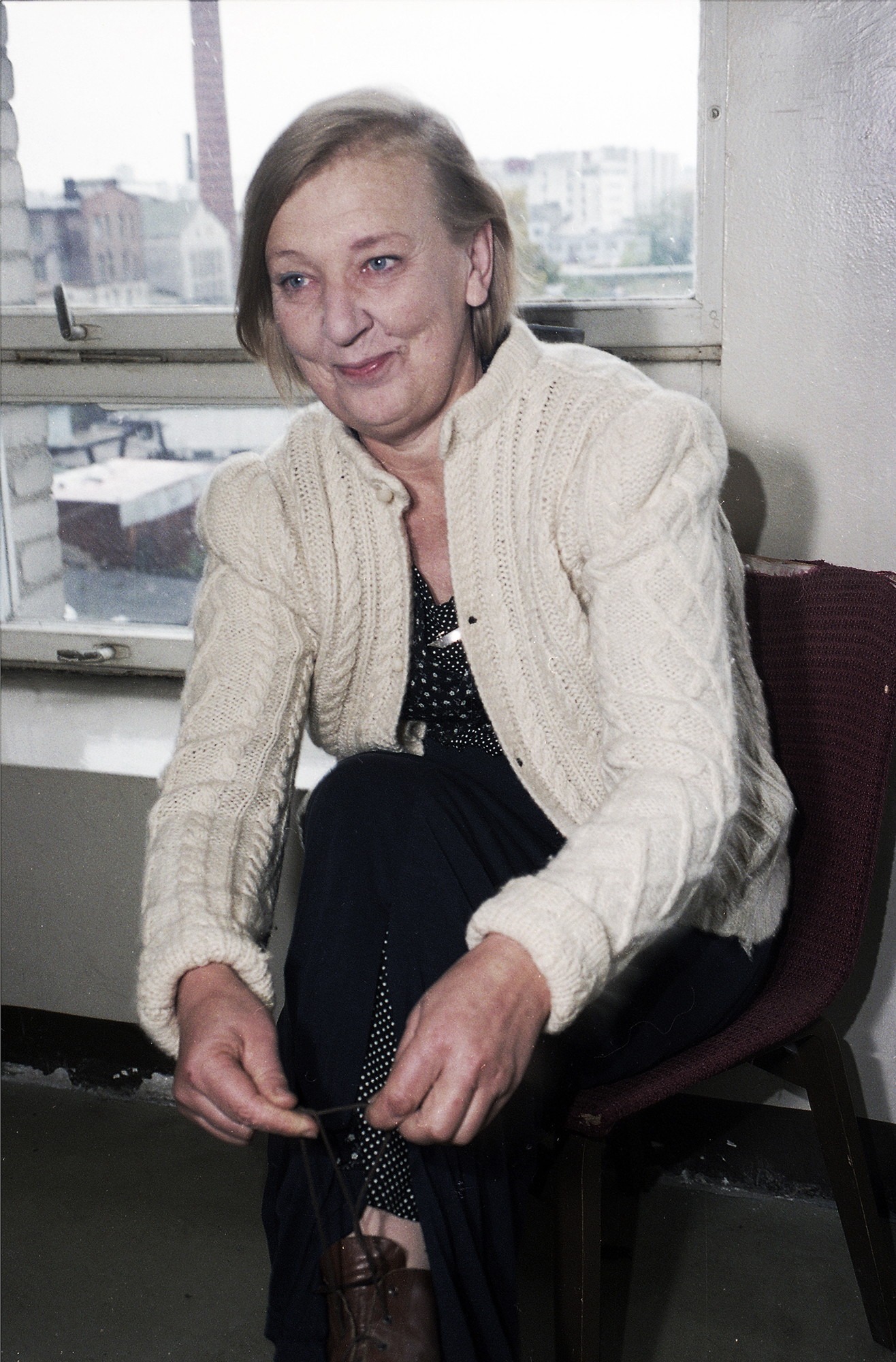
- Aru in 1993
- Born: Ines Parker; 1 July 1939 (age 87); Tallinn, Estonia
- Occupation: Actress
- Years active: 1960–present
- Spouse: Kaarel Aru
- Children: 2

Ines Aru (born Ines Parker; 1 July 1939) is an Estonian stage, radio, voice, television, and film actress whose career began in the early 1960s.

== Early life and education ==
Ines Aru was born Ines Parker in Tallinn to Martin Johannes Parker and Leena Parker (née Laid). Both of her parents were communist activists who had been incarcerated by Estonian authorities in the early 1920s during the Trial of the 149 for their political activity and released in 1938, the year prior to her birth. Following the German occupation of Estonia during World War II in July 1941, she was evacuated to Samara Oblast in the Ural Mountains of Russia with her mother and grandmother. Her father remained in Tallinn and planned to join them shortly thereafter. In August 1941, he boarded a ship at the Port of Tallinn that struck a mine and was killed. Her mother Leena died of tuberculosis while in Russia on 3 December 1942 at age forty when Ines was three years old. Afterward, she returned to Estonia with her grandmother who raised her in Tallinn.

Ines Parker attended primary and secondary schools in Tallinn. One of her primary school friends and classmates was future politician Marju Lauristin. After secondary school, she enrolled in courses at the Tallinn State Conservatory (now, the Estonian Academy of Music and Theatre) under the course supervision of theatre pedagogue Voldemar Panso; graduating from the academy in 1961. Among her classmates were noted future actors Tõnu Aav, Mikk Mikiver, Maila Rästas, Aarne Üksküla, Madis Ojamaa, Jaan Saul, Meeli Sööt, and Mati Klooren.

== Career ==
=== Stage ===
After graduating from the Tallinn State Conservatory, Ines Parker began a two-year engagement as a stage actress at the Ugala theatre in Viljandi in 1961. From 1963 until 1964, she was engaged at the Vanemuine in Tartu, and from 1964 until 1965, she had an engagement at the Philharmonic Society of the Estonian SSR in Tallinn. Afterwards, she was engaged at the Rakvere Theatre in Rakvere from 1965 until 1973, and the Old Town Theatre from its opening in 1980, until leaving in 1994. She has since been a freelance stage actress and has appeared on many other stage theatres throughout Estonia, and occasionally returning to theatres she had previously been engaged with as a freelance actress for productions.

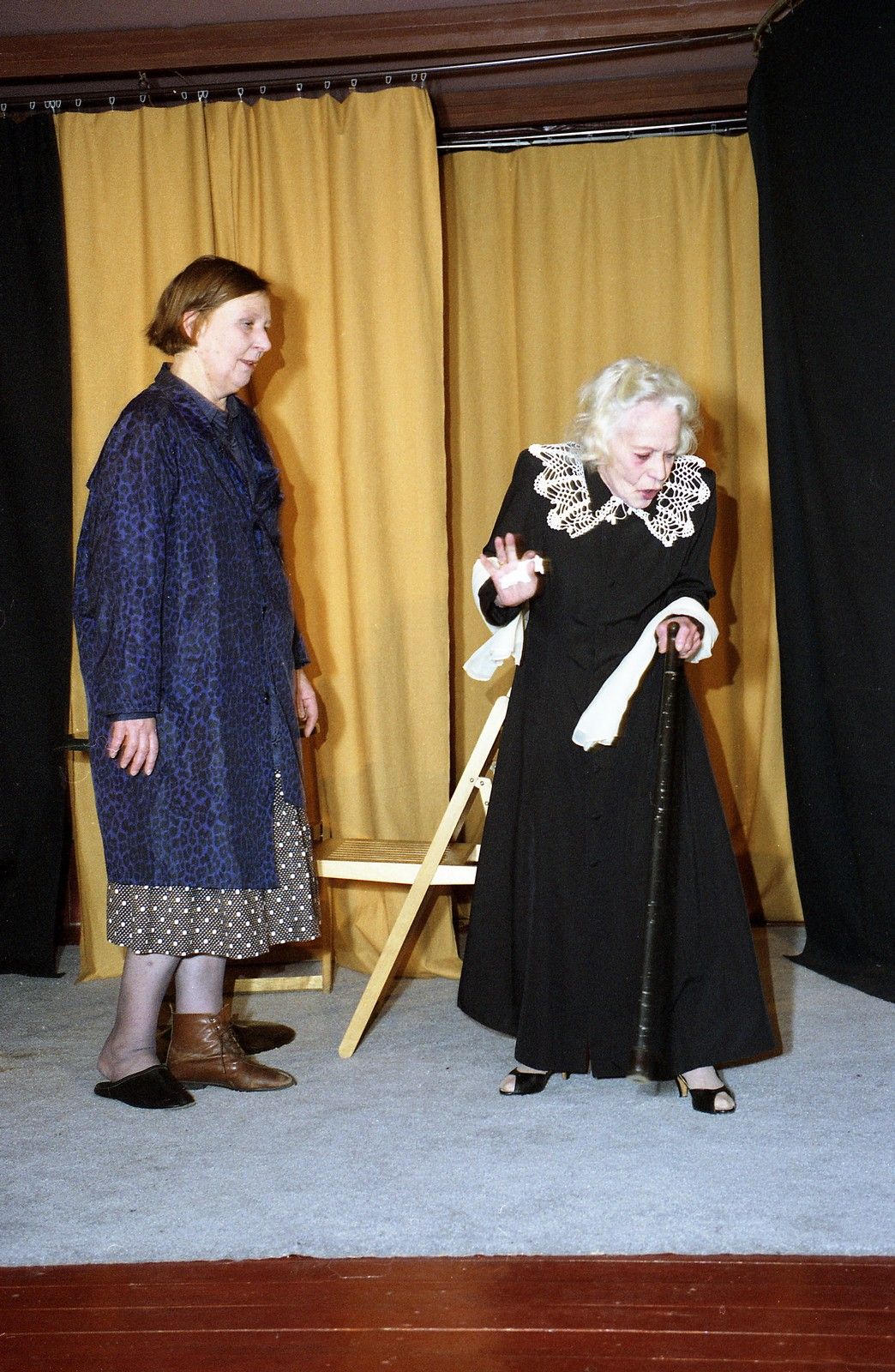
Aru (left) with actress Salme Reek at the Salong-Teater in 1994

During her engagement at the Philharmonic, former Tallinn State Conservatory classmate Madis Ojamaa developed a comedic, satirical character called Eliisabet Jõhvi for Parker. The character proved to be very popular with the public and Ines Parker (later as Ines Aru) would continue to portray Eliisabet Jõhvi on Estonian television and radio for many years afterward, delivering humorous monologues.

=== Film ===
As Ines Parker, she began her film career with a small role in the 1960 Herbert Rappaport-directed drama Vihmas ja päikeses for Tallinna Kinostuudio (now, Tallinnfilm). This was followed by the more significant role of Laine Arro in the 1962 Igor Yeltsov-directed drama Ühe katuse all, based on the 1957 novel Ühes majas by Estonian author Hans Leberecht. Other roles in the 1960s including a small role in the Veljo Käsper-directed, Lilli Promet-penned Tütarlaps mustas in 1967, and a pivotal role as the cynical Ulvi in the 1968 Käsper-directed comedy Viini postmark.

During the 1970s, Ines Aru (now credited by her married surname) was largely absent from films and focused on her roles in the theatre. She returned to film with the role of Mother in the 1981 Helle Karis-directed family-fantasy musical Nukitsamees. The following year she appeared in the Arvo Kruusement-directed drama Karge meri, based on the 1938 novel of the same name by author August Gailit, which chronicles the difficult lives of traditional Estonian seal hunters on the Baltic Sea coast. Aru would appear in a number of other small roles in film throughout the 1980s, including the 1984 Helle Karis-directed family-fantasy film Karoliine hõbelõng, and the 1987 Karis-directed fantasy film Metsluiged; a film adaptation of the 1838 Hans Christian Andersen fairy tale The Wild Swans.

Aru began the 1990s with the role of Ilse in the 1990 Arvo Iho-directed drama Ainult hulludele ehk halastajaõde for Tallinnfilm. In 1994, she appeared in a small role in the Jaan Kolberg-directed biopic Jüri Rumm about the 19th-century Estonian folk hero and outlaw Rummu Jüri. Aru has also worked as a voice actress in several animated Estonian films of the 1990s. She continued working in feature films into the 2000s; in 2006, she appeared as Aino in the Katrin Laur-directed family comedy-fantasy film Ruudi. In 2021, she appeared as the character Markus' grandmother in the Priit Pääsuke-directed youth comedy Öölapsed for Alexandra Film.

=== Television ===
In addition to her work on stage and in film, Ines Aru has also worked as a television actress, although not as prolifically. In 1982, she appeared in a small role in the Leo Karpin-directed television film Teisikud. In 2005, she appeared in the Jaak Kilmi-directed comedy-drama television film Kohtumine tundmatuga. Between 2009 and 2015, she made several appearances on the TV3 comedy-crime series Kättemaksukontor. Her character Eliisabet Jõhvi, created in the 1960s, is also frequently seen on television in skits and monologues.

=== Radio ===
Aru has frequently appeared in radio theatre and was the first Estonian actor to receive the Radio Theatre Award twice: in 2002, for her role as Neenu in a radio production of August Gailit's Ekke Moor, and in 2014, for her role as Reet in a production of Mati Unt's Sügisilmutus.

== Personal life ==
Ines Parker wed Kaarel Aru in the late 1960s. The couple have two children; a daughter and a son. She currently lives in Tallinn and has a summer home on the island of Hiiumaa.

== Acknowledgements ==
- Merited Artist of the Estonian Soviet Socialist Republic (1985)
- Meie Mats Award (1995)
- Radio Theatre Award (2002)
- Order of the White Star, IV Class (2013)
- Radio Theatre Award (2014)
