= Maila (given name) =

Female given name

- Gender: Female
- Language: Estonian, Finnish
- Name day: 10 June (Estonia); 17 May (Finland)

Origin
- Region of origin: Estonia, Finland

Other names
- Related names: Maali, Maile, Maili, Mailis

Maila is a predominantly Estonian and Finnish feminine given name.

As of 1 January 2020, 321 women in Estonia have the first name Maila, making it the 396th most popular female name in the country. The name is most commonly found in Valga County. Individuals bearing the name Maila include:

- Maila Ankkuri (born 1944), Finnish long track speed skater
- Maila Lehtimäki (born 1966), Finnish long track speed skater
- Maila Nisula (born 1931), Finnish gymnast
- Maila Nurmi (1922–2008), American actress and television personality
- Maila Rästas (1937–2008), Estonian actress
- Maila Talvio (1871–1951), Finnish writer
