= Lääne =

Lääne may refer to:

- Lääne County, one of 15 counties of Estonia
- Tiit Lääne (born 1958), Estonian journalist

== See also ==
- Lääne Elu, an Estonian language newspaper
- Lääne-Viru County, county of Estonia
- Laane (disambiguation)
