= 1922 in Estonia =

- Decades: 1900s; 1910s; 1920s; 1930s; 1940s
- See also: Other events of 1922; Timeline of Estonian history

This article lists events that occurred during 1922 in Estonia.

== Incumbents ==
- Head of State – Konstantin Päts
- Head of State – Juhan Kukk

== Events ==
- 22 September – Estonia joined the League of Nations.

== Births ==
- 16 February – Lilli Promet, Estonian writer
- 11 April – Arved Viirlaid, Estonian writer

== Deaths ==
- May 4 – Viktor Kingissepp, Estonian Communist politician (b. 1888; executed)
