= 1928 in Estonia =

- Decades: 1900s; 1910s; 1920s; 1930s; 1940s
- See also: Other events of 1928; Timeline of Estonian history

This article lists events that occurred during 1928 in Estonia.

== Events ==
- The Estonian Central Federation of Veterans of the War of Independence was formed.
