= Ivi Kreen =

Estonian television presenter

Ivi Kreen (born 9 October 1935 in Kiviõli) is an Estonian former television presenter. She was presenter of the show Aktuaalne kaamera for Eesti Televisioon from 1961 to 1990.
