= 1932 in Estonia =

- Decades: 1910s; 1920s; 1930s; 1940s; 1950s
- See also: Other events of 1932; Timeline of Estonian history

This article lists events that occurred during 1932 in Estonia.

== Events ==
- Economic Depression in Estonia.
- 4 January – Soviet–Estonian Non-Aggression Pact was signed.
- Estonian Encyclopedia was started to be published (until 1937).

== Births ==
- 24 January – Jaan Puhvel, linguist (d. 2026)
- 24 June – Heli Lääts, singer (d. 2018)
