= 1936 in Estonia =

- Decades: 1910s; 1920s; 1930s; 1940s; 1950s
- See also: Other events of 1936; Timeline of Estonian history

This article lists events that occurred during 1936 in Estonia.

== Events ==
- Tallinn Technical Institute (later Tallinn University of Technology) is founded.
- Tallinn Airport was opened.

== Births ==
- 17 March – Ants-Enno Lõhmus, Estonian politician
- 22 May – Ülo Tärno, Estonian politician
- 4 June – Tarmo Timm, Estonian zoologist
- 23 September – Vello Jaaska, Estonian botanist
- 24 October – Jüri Arrak, Estonian painter
