= 1935 in Estonia =

- Decades: 1910s; 1920s; 1930s; 1940s; 1950s
- See also: Other events of 1935; Timeline of Estonian history

This article lists events that occurred during 1935 in Estonia.

== Events ==
- Patriotic League is founded.
- Estonian Maritime Museum is founded.

== Births ==
- 19 January – Fred Jüssi, Estonian biologist, nature writer and photographer
- 11 September – Arvo Pärt, Estonian composer
