= 1926 in Estonia =

- Decades: 1900s; 1910s; 1920s; 1930s; 1940s
- See also: Other events of 1926; Timeline of Estonian history

This article lists events that occurred during 1926 in Estonia.

== Events ==
- Estonian Radio Symphony Orchestra established, playing their first concert in December.
- Nõmme gained town rights.
- 18 December – Raadio Ringhääling starts regular broadcasts

== Births ==
- 2 February – Lia Laats, actress (d. 2004)
