= 1920 in Estonia =

- Decades: 1900s; 1910s; 1920s; 1930s; 1940s
- See also: Other events of 1920; Timeline of Estonian history

This article lists events that occurred during 1920 in Estonia.

== Events ==
- 2 February – Treaty of Tartu which gave Estonia recognition by Soviet Russia.
- 15 June – adoption of Constitution.

== Births ==
- 21 March – Georg Ots, singer
