= 1938 in Estonia =

- Decades: 1910s; 1920s; 1930s; 1940s; 1950s
- See also: Other events of 1938; Timeline of Estonian history

This article lists events that occurred during 1938 in Estonia.

== Incumbents ==
- Prime Minister – Kaarel Eenpalu
- President – Konstantin Päts

== Events ==
- 24 February – election sees National Front winning 63 seats and all the opposition winning 17 seats.
- New Constitution is adopted.
- Estonian Academy of Sciences is founded.

== Births ==
- 22 March – Rein Etruk, Estonian chess player
- 6 November – Olli Toomik, Estonian physician and politician
- 24 November – Hando Runnel, Estonian writer
