= 1930 in Estonia =

- Decades: 1910s; 1920s; 1930s; 1940s; 1950s
- See also: Other events of 1930; Timeline of Estonian history

This article lists events that occurred during 1930 in Estonia.

== Events ==
- Economic Depression in Estonia.

== Births ==
- 31 May – Uno Loop, Estonian singer
