= 1921 in Estonia =

- Decades: 1900s; 1910s; 1920s; 1930s; 1940s
- See also: Other events of 1921; Timeline of Estonian history

This article lists events that occurred during 1921 in Estonia.

== Incumbents ==
- Head of State – Ants Piip
- Head of State – Konstantin Päts

== Events ==
- Estonia joins League of Nations.
- Tallinn French School was founded.

== Births ==
- 11 July – Ülo Lepik, mathematician and mechanics researcher (d. 2022)
- 11 December – Ilmar Laaban, writer (d. 2000)
