= Koordi =

Village in Estonia

Coordinates: 58°58′N 25°43′E

- Village
- Interactive map of Koordi
- Country: Estonia
- County: Järva County
- Municipality: Paide
- Time zone: UTC+2 (EET)
  - Summer (DST): UTC+3 (EEST)

Koordi is a village in Paide municipality, Järva County, in northern-central Estonia. Prior to the 2017 administrative reform in Estonia of local governments, it was located in Roosna-Alliku Parish.

Koordi was the formal location of Hans Leberecht's 1948 book Valgus Koordis (Light in Koordi). In 1950 a film with the same name was made.
