= 1931 in Estonia =

- Decades: 1910s; 1920s; 1930s; 1940s; 1950s
- See also: Other events of 1931; Timeline of Estonian history

This article lists events that occurred during 1931 in Estonia.

== Events ==
- Economic Depression in Estonia.

== Births ==
- 1 April – Ita Ever, Estonian actress (d. 2023)
- 16 October – Lauri Einer, Estonian politician
- 18 October – Olivia Saar, Estonian children's writer, poet, journalist, and editor (d. 2025)
