= 1919 in Estonia =

- Decades: 1890s; 1900s; 1910s; 1920s; 1930s
- See also: Other events of 1919; Timeline of Estonian history

This article lists events that occurred during 1919 in Estonia.

== Incumbents ==
- Prime Minister – Konstantin Päts
- Prime Minister – Otto Strandman

== Events ==
- 9 January – Estonian War of Independence: Estonians retake Tapa from the Bolsheviks, which enabled further liberation of Estonia.
- 9 May – Otto Strandman's cabinet is formed.
- Estonian War of Independence: Bolsheviks were driven out from Estonia.
- 10 October – Agrarian Law passed redistributing many of the estates owned by Baltic Germans and Estonian landowners.
- 1 December – Tartu University is re-opened.

== Births ==
- 10 March – Pavel Bogovski, Estonian oncologist and anatomy pathologist

== Deaths ==
- February 2 – Julius Kuperjanov, Estonian military commander (b. 1894)
- April 27 – Anton Irv, Estonian military officer (b. 1886)
