= 1927 in Estonia =

- Decades: 1900s; 1910s; 1920s; 1930s; 1940s
- See also: Other events of 1927; Timeline of Estonian history

This article lists events that occurred during 1927 in Estonia.

== Events ==
- 1 January – the currency was changed: the marks were replaced by the krones.
- Chemical industry started to use oil shale.

== Births ==
- 7 February – Raimund Hagelberg, economist and professor (d. 2012)
