= 1918 in Estonia =

- Decades: 1890s; 1900s; 1910s; 1920s; 1930s
- See also: Other events of 1918; Timeline of Estonian history

This article lists events that occurred during 1918 in Estonia.

== Events ==
- 1 February – new calendar: Julian calendar is replaced by Gregorian. This means that 1 February becomes 14 February.
- 24 February – Estonian Declaration of Independence.
- End of February: Germans in power.
- 3 March – Treaty of Brest-Litovsk. Bolshevist Russia cedes sovereignty over Estonia to Germany.
- 11 November – Germans began withdrawal and turn over power to the provisional government of Estonia (headed by Konstantin Päts).
- 11 November – Estonian Defence League is founded.
- 22 November – Estonia was invaded by Bolshevist Russian forces. Beginning of Estonian War of Independence.
- National Library of Estonia established.
- Tallinn College of Engineering and Higher Music School established.
