= 1933 in Estonia =

- Decades: 1910s; 1920s; 1930s; 1940s; 1950s
- See also: Other events of 1933; Timeline of Estonian history

This article lists events that occurred during 1933 in Estonia.

== Incumbents ==
- Head of State – Konstantin Päts
- Head of State – Jaan Tõnisson

== Events ==
- 14 October – plebiscite in favour of constitutional reform giving wide powers to a new office of the president. (to 16 October)
- War of Independence Veterans' League emerges and enters into politics.

== Births ==
- 21 May – Enn Põldroos, painter, monumental artist and writer (d. 2025)
- 13 December – Feliks Kark, actor

== Deaths ==
- August 29 – August Kirsimägi, writer (b. 1905)
- December 26 – Eduard Vilde, writer (b. 1865)
