= Eesti tippmodell =

Estonian television series

- Official Show Logo
- Genre: Reality television
- Created by: Tyra Banks
- Presented by: Liisi Eesmaa
- Judges: Liisi Eesmaa; Toomas Volkmann; Mari-Liis Helvik; Kaja Wunder; Arne Niit; Margit Jogger; Urmas Väljaots
- Ending theme: "It's a Man's Man's Man's World" by James Brown
- No. of seasons: 4
- No. of episodes: 54

Original release
- Network: Kanal 2
- Release: 5 March 2012 – February 26, 2016

Eesti tippmodell (English: Estonia's top model) is an Estonian reality documentary based on Tyra Banks' America's Next Top Model that places contestants against each other in a variety of challenges and photo shoots to determine who will win the title of Estonia's Next Top Model, with prizes including the cover of a magazine, and a contract with a modeling agency.

== Show format ==
Each week the contestants have to go through a challenge, a photo shoot, and judging; at the end of the week, one or more models are eliminated until the winner is revealed. Based upon the models' performance in the week's challenge, photo shoot, and general attitude, the judges deliberate and decide which contestant must leave the competition.

Once the judges have made their decision, the contestants are called back into the room. The host calls out the names of the models who performed well in the challenge and photo shoot, giving them a copy of their best photo from the shoot. The last two contestants, whose names have not been called, are given criticism about why they were in the bottom two, and one is eliminated. The person who is eliminated does not receive a photo.

== Judges ==
Judge	Season			
Judge	1 (2012)	2 (2013–2014)	3 (2014–2015)	4 (2015–2016)
Hosts
Kaja Wunder	Head Judge			
Liisi Eesmaa		Head Judge	Head Judge	Head Judge
Judging Panelists
Margit Jõgger	Main			
Arne Niit	Main			Guest
Toomas Volkmann	Main	Main	Main	Main
Urmas Väljaots		Main	Main	
Mari-Liis Helvik				Main

== Cycles ==
Cycle	Premiere date	Winner	Runner-up	Other contestants in order of elimination	Number of contestants	International Destinations
1	5 March 2012	Helina Metsik	Xena Vassiljeva	Kerli Sabbal, Anne-Lys Kuldmaa-Pärisalu, Gerli Kai Sosaar & Aleksandra Cherdakova, Anita Tumaš, Evelin Orav, Mari Naujokas, Ksenia Viksne, Adeline Vaher-Vahter, Lisann Luik, Keiu Simm (quit), Triinu Lääne	14	London
2	14 October 2013	Sandra Ude	Kristine Smirnova, Monika Hatto	Egle Hindrikson, Kelly Illak, Maria Raja, Gerttu Pajusalu, Grete Kinter, Kristiina-Liisa Rätto, Arni Oštšepkova, Kairi Eliaser, Olga Krõlova	12	Stockholm
3	4 December 2014	Aule Õun	Hendrik Adler, Liise Hanni, Jekaterina Bulgarina	Hanna-Maria Sell, Kristina Trees, Mona Kattel, Hristina Parimskaja, Stefani Kask, Kevin Sarapuu, Sandro Pullakbutu, Gerili Narusing	12	Milan
4	14 December 2015	Kätlin Hallik	German Pinelis	Maria Bountiy, Diana Haprova (disqualified), Taavet Suurmõts & Liina Ilves, Joosep Padu, Kristjan Sõrg, Rait Nöör & Alice Philips, Helena Pertens, Anastassia Bubnilkina, Antonio Kass, Evelina Säkk	14	None
