= 1929 in Estonia =

- Decades: 1900s; 1910s; 1920s; 1930s; 1940s
- See also: Other events of 1929; Timeline of Estonian history

This article lists events that occurred during 1929 in Estonia.

== Events ==
- Economic Depression in Estonia.

== Births ==
- 23 February – Jaan Einasto, Estonian astrophysicist
- 21 July – Asta Vihandi, opera singer and actress (died 1993)

== Deaths ==
- 29 January – Jens Christian Johansen, engineer (born 1868 in Denmark)
