= Eesti tippmodell season 2 =

Season of television series

Eesti tippmodell
- Season 2
- No. of episodes: 14

Release
- Original network: Kanal 2
- Original release: October 14, 2013 – January 13, 2014

Season chronology
- ← Previous; Season 1 Next → Season 3

The second season of Eesti tippmodell, the Estonian adaptation of Tyra Banks's reality television series America's Next Top Model, aired from October 2013 to January 2014. The judging panel for the season consisted of Urmas Väljaots, Thomas Volkmann, and the host of the competition, Liisi Eesmaa.

The winner of the competition was 18-year-old Sandra Ude, from Tallinn. Her prize was a modelling contract with Elite Model Management, a cover of Estonian Cosmopolitan, and a trip to Rio de Janeiro.

Runner-up Kristine Smirnova was later selected as one of the fourteen finalists of Season 5 of Top Model po-russki, where she placed 10th overall.

== Episode summaries ==
=== Episode 1 ===
Casting episode.

=== Episode 2 ===
- First call-out: Sandra Ude
- Bottom two: Egle Hindrikson & Kairi Eliaser
- Eliminated: Egle Hindrikson

=== Episode 3 ===
- First call-out: Gerttu Pajusalu
- Bottom two: Kelly Illak & Sandra Ude
- Eliminated: Kelly Illak

=== Episode 4 ===
- Challenge winner: Kristine Smirnova
- First call-out: Olga Krõlova
- Bottom two: Kristiina-Liisa Rätto & Maria Raja
- Eliminated: Maria Raja

=== Episode 5 ===
- First call-out: Kristine Smirnova
- Bottom two: Gerttu Pajusalu & Grete Kinter
- Eliminated: Gerttu Pajusalu

=== Episode 6 ===
- Challenge winner: Kristine Smirnova
- First call-out: Kairi Eliaser
- Bottom two: Grete Kinter & Kristiina-Liisa Rätto
- Eliminated: Grete Kinter

=== Episode 7 ===
- First call-out: Monika Hatto
- Bottom two: Kristiina-Liisa Rätto & Olga Krõlova
- Eliminated: Kristiina-Liisa Rätto

=== Episode 8 ===
- Special guest: Asa Stensson

=== Episode 9 ===
- First call-out: Sandra Ude
- Bottom two: Arni Oštšepkova & Monika Hatto
- Eliminated: None

=== Episode 10 ===
- First call-out: Olga Krõlova
- Bottom two: Arni Oštšepkova & Kairi Eliaser
- Eliminated: Arni Oštšepkova

=== Episode 11 ===
- First call-out: Kristine Smirnova
- Bottom two: Kairi Eliaser & Monika Hatto
- Eliminated: Kairi Eliaser

=== Episode 12 ===
- First call-out: Kristine Smirnova
- Bottom two: Monika Hatto & Olga Krõlova
- Eliminated: Olga Krõlova

=== Episode 13 ===
Recap episode.

=== Episode 14 ===
- Special guest: Asa Stensson
- Final three: Kristine Smirnova, Monika Hatto & Sandra Ude
- Estonia's Next Top Model: Sandra Ude

== Contestants ==
(ages are stated at start of contest)

Contestant	Age	Hometown	Height	Finish	Place
Egle Hindrikson	27	Tartu	1.73 m (5 ft 8 in)	Episode 2	12
Kelly Illak	27	Tallinn	1.75 m (5 ft 9 in)	Episode 3	11
Maria Raja	22	Tartu	1.72 m (5 ft 7 1/2 in)	Episode 4	10
Gerttu Pajusalu	17	Laagri	1.72 m (5 ft 7 1/2 in)	Episode 5	9
Grete Kinter	16	Tartu	1.79 m (5 ft 10 1/2 in)	Episode 6	8
Kristiina-Liisa Rätto	17	Tartumaa	1.70 m (5 ft 7 in)	Episode 7	7
Arina 'Arni' Oštšepkova	20	Tallinn	1.67 m (5 ft 5 1/2 in)	Episode 10	6
Kairi Eliaser	22	Võru	1.66 m (5 ft 5 1/2 in)	Episode 11	5
Olga Krõlova	25	Tallinn	1.75 m (5 ft 9 in)	Episode 12	4
Monika Hatto	17	Raplamaa	1.78 m (5 ft 10 in)	Episode 14	3–2
Kristine Smirnova	26	Tallinn	1.75 m (5 ft 9 in)	Episode 14	3–2
Sandra Ude	18	Tallinn	1.78 m (5 ft 10 in)	Episode 14	1

== Summaries ==
=== Call-out order ===
Order	Episodes											
Order	1	2	3	4	5	6	7	9	10	11	12	14
1	Arni	Sandra	Gerttu	Olga	Kristine	Kairi	Monika	Sandra	Olga	Kristine	Kristine	Sandra
2	Egle	Maria	Kairi	Kristine	Arni	Arni	Arni	Kristine	Monika	Olga	Sandra	Kristine; Monika
3	Gerttu	Kelly	Monika	Monika	Olga	Kristine	Kairi	Olga	Kristine	Sandra	Monika	Kristine; Monika
4	Grete	Arni	Grete	Sandra	Kairi	Olga	Kristine	Kairi	Sandra	Monika	Olga	
5	Kairi	Kristiina	Kristiina	Grete	Monika	Monika	Sandra	Arni	Kairi	Kairi		
6	Kelly	Olga	Arni	Kairi	Kristiina	Sandra	Olga	Monika	Arni			
7	Kristiina	Monika	Olga	Gerttu	Sandra	Kristiina	Kristiina					
8	Kristine	Gerttu	Kristine	Arni	Grete	Grete						
9	Maria	Grete	Maria	Kristiina	Gerttu							
10	Monika	Kristine	Sandra	Maria								
11	Olga	Kairi	Kelly									
12	Sandra	Egle										

The contestant was eliminated
The contestant was immune from elimination
The contestant was deemed to be the worst that week, but was not eliminated
The contestant won the competition

- Episode 1 was the casting episode. During elimination, the girls were called in alphabetical order to learn whether or not they had proceeded to the main competition.
- In episode 4, Kristine was immune from elimination for winning the challenge.
- In episode 8, no panel was held. Only the season's go-sees and a photo shoot for Halens took place.
- In episode 9, no-one was eliminated.
- Episode 13 was the recap episode.

=== Photo shoot guide ===
- Episode 2 photo shoot: B&W swimwear in the countryside and beach
- Episode 3 photo shoot: B&W simplistic beauty shots
- Episode 4 photo shoot: Nike sportswear jumping on a trampoline
- Episode 5 photo shoot: Underwater beauties chained to the ocean floor
- Episode 6 photo shoot: Glamorous actresses
- Episode 7 photo shoots: Styled to rock while jumping in the air; rock lolita
- Episode 8 photo shoot: Halens catalog
- Episode 9 photo shoot: Runway by a pond; posing in gowns with a male model on a tractor
- Episode 10 photo shoots: Young vs old glamour; sports calendar
- Episode 11 photo shoot: Icy winter queens; embodying Bratzillaz
- Episode 12 photo shoots: Snake and jewelry beauty shots; Magnum ice cream campaign
- Episode 14 photo shoot: Cosmopolitan covers
