= Eesti tippmodell season 1 =

Season of television series

Eesti tippmodell
- Season 1
- No. of episodes: 14

Release
- Original network: Kanal 2
- Original release: March 5 – June 4, 2012

Season chronology
- Next → Season 2

Eesti tippmodell, season 1 was the first installment of the Estonian adaptation of America's Next Top Model founded by Tyra Banks. The judges for season one, were Kaja Wunder, Margit Jõgger, Toomas Volkmann, and Arne Niit.

The winner of the competition was 15-year-old Helina Metsik, from Pärnu. Her prize was a one-year modelling contract with Premier Model Management, and appear on the cover of Estonian Cosmopolitan.

== Contestants ==
(ages are stated at start of contest)

Contestant	Age	Height	Hometown	Finish	Place
Kerli Sabbal	18	1.70 m (5 ft 7 in)	Harju	Episode 2	14
Anne-Lys Kuldmaa-Pärisalu	22	1.75 m (5 ft 9 in)	Harju	Episode 3	13
Gerli Kai Sosaar	19	1.79 m (5 ft 10 1/2 in)	Pärnu	Episode 4	12–11
Aleksandra Cherdakova	20	1.73 m (5 ft 8 in)	Ida-Viru	Episode 4	12–11
Anita Tumaš	17	1.70 m (5 ft 7 in)	Ida-Viru	Episode 5	10
Evelin Orav	18	1.74 m (5 ft 8 1/2 in)	Viljandi	Episode 6	9
Mari Naujokas	16	1.75 m (5 ft 9 in)	Tartu	Episode 7	8
Ksenia Viksne	23	1.75 m (5 ft 9 in)	Harju	Episode 9	7
Adeline Vaher-Vahter	21	1.79 m (5 ft 10 1/2 in)	Pärnu	Episode 10	6
Lisann Luik	25	1.75 m (5 ft 9 in)	Lääne	Episode 11	5
Keiu Simm	16	1.75 m (5 ft 9 in)	Ida-Viru	Episode 14	4 (quit)
Triinu Lääne	21	1.75 m (5 ft 9 in)	Pärnu	Episode 14	3
Ksenia 'Xena' Vassiljeva	17	1.74 m (5 ft 8 1/2 in)	Harju	Episode 14	2
Helina Metsik	15	1.77 m (5 ft 9 1/2 in)	Pärnu	Episode 14	1

== Episode summaries ==
=== Episode 1 ===
Casting episode.

=== Episode 2 ===
- First call-out: Xena Vassiljeva
- Bottom two: Anne-Lys Kuldmaa-Pärisalu & Kerli Sabbal
- Eliminated: Kerli Sabbal

=== Episode 3 ===
- First call-out: Keiu Simm
- Bottom two: Anne-Lys Kuldmaa-Pärisalu & Mari Naujokas
- Eliminated: Anne-Lys Kuldmaa-Pärisalu

=== Episode 4 ===
- First call-out: Triinu Lääne
- Bottom two: Aleksandra Cherdakova & Gerli Kai Sosaar
- Eliminated: Aleksandra Cherdakova & Gerli Kai Sosaar

=== Episode 5 ===
- First call-out: Adeline Vaher-Vahter & Ksenia Viksne
- Bottom two: Anita Tumaš & Evelin Orav
- Eliminated: Anita Tumaš

=== Episode 6 ===
- First call-out: Helina Metsik
- Bottom two: Evelin Orav & Triinu Lääne
- Eliminated: Evelin Orav

=== Episode 7 ===
- Eliminated: Mari Naujokas
- First call-out: Lisann Luik
- Bottom two: Adeline Vaher-Vahter & Xena Vassiljeva
- Eliminated: None

=== Episode 8 ===
- First call-out: None
- Bottom two: None
- Eliminated: None

=== Episode 9 ===
- First call-out: Helina Metsik
- Bottom two: Ksenia Viksne & Lisann Luik
- Eliminated: Ksenia Viksne

=== Episode 10 ===
- First call-out: Helina Metsik
- Bottom two: Adeline Vaher-Vahter & Xena Vassiljeva
- Eliminated: Adeline Vaher-Vahter

=== Episode 11 ===
- First call-out: Xena Vassiljeva
- Bottom two: Lisann Luik & Triinu Lääne
- Eliminated: Lisann Luik

=== Episode 12 ===
- First call-out: Xena Vassiljeva
- Bottom two: Helina Metsik & Triinu Lääne
- Eliminated: Triinu Lääne

=== Episode 13 ===
Recap episode.

=== Episode 14 ===
- Quit: Keiu Simm
- Returned: Triinu Lääne
- Final three: Helina Metsik, Xena Vassiljeva & Triinu Lääne
- Second runner-up: Triinu Lääne
- Runner- up: Xena Vassiljeva
- Estonia's Next Top Model: Helina Metsik

== Summaries ==
=== Call-out order ===
Kaja's call-out order
Order	Episodes										
Order	2	3	4	5	6	7	9	10	11	12	14
1	Xena	Keiu	Triinu	Adeline; Ksenia	Helina	Lisann	Helina	Helina	Xena	Xena	Helina
2	Helina	Aleksandra	Evelin	Adeline; Ksenia	Keiu	Keiu	Triinu	Triinu	Helina	Keiu	Xena
3	Aleksandra	Evelin	Lisann	Keiu	Ksenia	Triinu	Keiu	Keiu	Keiu	Helina	Triinu
4	Triinu	Helina	Xena	Mari	Lisann	Ksenia	Lisann	Lisann	Triinu	Triinu	Keiu
5	Keiu	Triinu	Anita	Triinu	Xena	Helina	Ksenia	Xena	Lisann		
6	Anita	Adeline	Adeline	Xena	Adeline	Adeline; Xena	Adeline	Adeline			
7	Adeline	Lisann	Helina	Helina	Mari	Adeline; Xena	Xena				
8	Evelin	Xena	Ksenia	Lisann	Triinu	Mari					
9	Gerli Kai	Gerli Kai	Mari	Evelin	Evelin						
10	Ksenia	Ksenia	Keiu	Anita							
11	Mari	Anita	Aleksandra; Gerli Kai								
12	Lisann	Mari	Aleksandra; Gerli Kai								
13	Anne-Lys	Anne-Lys									
14	Kerli										

The contestant was eliminated
The contestant was part of a non elimination bottom-two
The contestant was eliminated outside of the judging panel
The contestant was absent at elimination and was safe
The contestant quit the competition
The contestant won the competition

- In episode 4, Aleksandra and Gerli Kai landed in the bottom two. Both of them were eliminated from the competition.
- In episode 5, Adeline & Ksenia were collectively called out first.
- In episode 7, Mari was eliminated before the call-out order. Despite the fact that the judges thought Adeline and Xena had the worst pictures, they chose not to eliminate them. Instead, the girls missed out on the trip overseas the following episode as a punishment.
- In episode 8, there was no photo shoot or elimination. Only the London fashion show took place that week.
- In episode 9, Adeline and Xena did not take part in the call-out. The elimination of the episode was based on the photo shoot that the other five girls had in London.
- Episode 13 was the recap episode.
- In episode 14, Keiu quit the competition. Due to the number opening, Triinu was brought back.

=== Photo shoot guide ===
- Episode 2 photo shoot: Lingerie on Balbiino ice cream
- Episode 3 photo shoot: Posing with food
- Episode 4 photo shoot: Suspended over escalators in gowns
- Episode 5 photo shoot: Rock stars in pairs
- Episode 6 photo shoot: Brides in couture dresses with musician Tanel Padar
- Episode 7 photo shoot: Underwater shoot
- Episode 9 photo shoot: Pouring gasoline on a house
- Episode 10 photo shoots: Pin-up girls; Kristiine Keskus shopping center campaign
- Episode 11 photo shoots: Posing with a car; Cosmopolitan editorial; B&W beauty shots
- Episode 12 photo shoot: Tanel Veenre jewelry campaign
- Episode 14 motion picture: Passion for fashion
