= Tiit Hennoste =

Estonian philologist and linguist

Tiit Hennoste (2018)

Tiit Hennoste (born 12 August 1953 in Pärnu) is an Estonian philologist and linguist.

In 1985 he graduated from the University of Tartu.

His main topics of research are text studies and spoken language. He has created the model for text analysis (Estonian: tekstianalüüsi mudel); the central concept of the model is "cultural situation".

In 2018 he was awarded with the Order of the White Star, IV class.

== Publications ==
- Ajalehe kujundamine (1994, with R. Kurvits)
- Uudise käsiraamat: kuidas otsida, kirjutada, toimetada ja serveerida ajaleheuudist (2001, 2009)
- Eesti murded ja kohanimed (2002, 2009, one of the authors)
- Eurooplaseks saamine. Kõrvalkäija altkulmupilk: artikleid ja arvamusi 1986–2003 (2003)
- Dialoogiaktid eesti infodialoogides: tüpoloogia ja analüüs (2004, with A. Rääbis)
- Kommikoer ja pommikoer: üksteist lugu Eesti ajakirjandusest (2010)
