= Tiit Kala =

Estonian politician

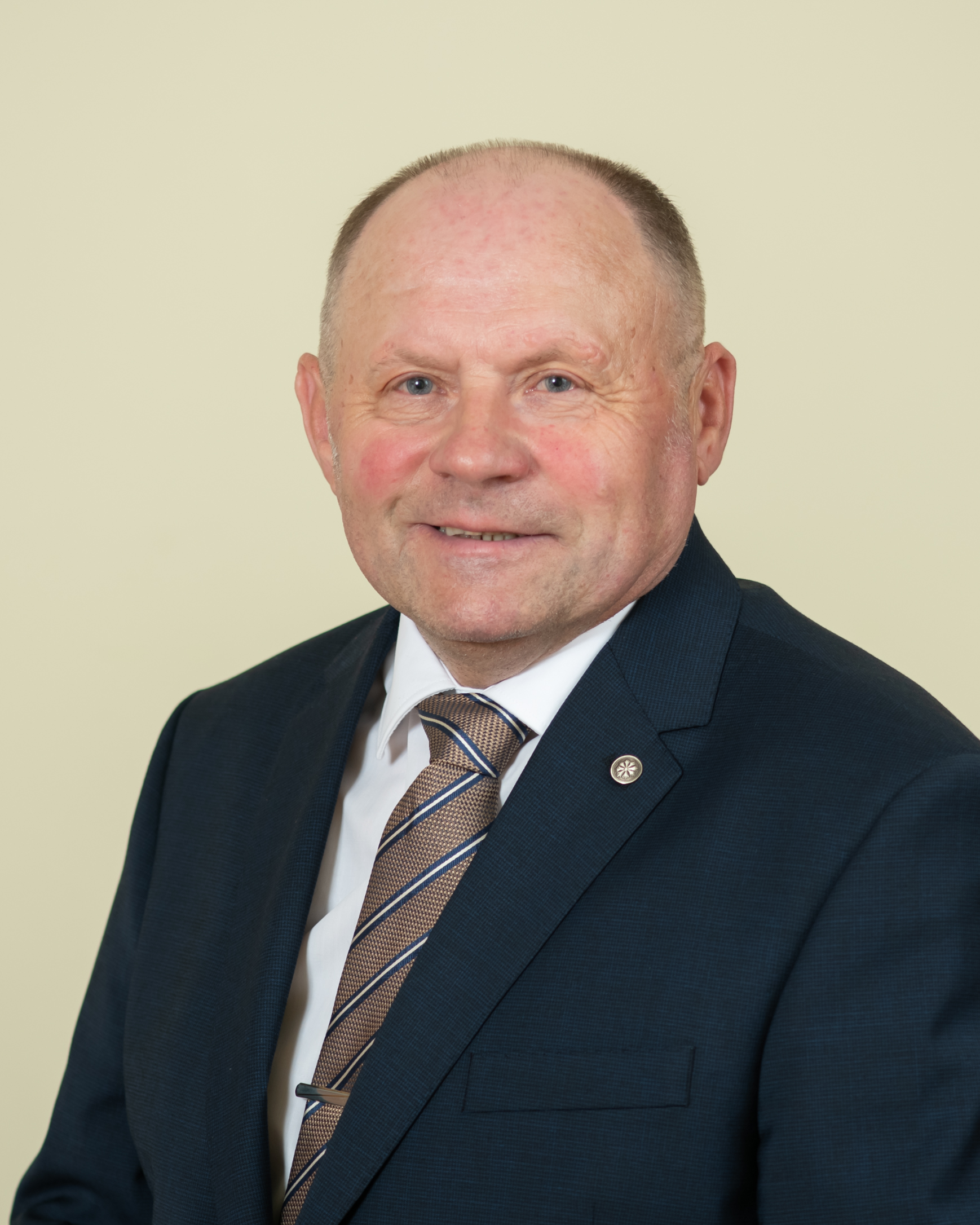
Tiit Kala in 2019

Tiit Kala (born 19 August 1954 in Tartu) is an Estonian politician. He has been a member of the XIV Riigikogu.

In 1974 he graduated from Palamuse State Farm Technical School of Forestry (nowadays Luua Forestry School).

From 2005 to 2009 he was the chairman of Räpina Rural Municipality Council.

Since 2005 he has been a member of Estonian Conservative People's Party.
