= Meeli Sööt =

Estonian actress (1937–2024)

- Born: Meeli Alev; 13 September 1937; Tallinn, Estonia
- Died: 16 March 2024 (aged 86)
- Occupation: Actress
- Years active: 1960–2011
- Spouse: Ants Sööt (m. 1961; div. 1978)

Meeli Sööt (13 September 1937 – 16 March 2024) was an Estonian stage, television, radio and film actress.

== Early life and education ==
Meeli Sööt was born Meeli Alev in Tallinn to actor Voldemar Alev and Alvine Alev (née Väravas). In 1956, she graduated from Tallinn 7th Secondary School (now, Tallinn English College). From 1956 until 1957, she studied at the Tallinn Pedagogical Institute (now, Tallinn University), and graduated in 1961 from the Tallinn State Conservatory, Performing Arts Department (now, the Estonian Academy of Music and Theatre) in Tallinn under the course supervision of theatre pedagogue Voldemar Panso. Among her classmates were noted future actors Tõnu Aav, Mikk Mikiver, Maila Rästas, Aarne Üksküla, Madis Ojamaa, Jaan Saul, Ines Aru, and Mati Klooren.

== Stage career ==
Following graduation in 1961, she became engaged at the Estonian Drama Theatre in Tallinn. She would remain an actress at the theatre until 2000. She made her stage debut in 1961 in a production of Pedro Calderón de la Barca's 1636 play The Phantom Lady while still a student.

During her nearly forty year engagement at the Estonian Drama Theater she performed in numerous stage productions as an actress. Among her more memorable roles in works by international authors and playwrights include: Molière, Ibsen, von Goethe, Chekhov, Strindberg, Vonnegut, Leo Tolstoy, Peter Shaffer, Jean Genet, Johannes Linnankoski, William Gibson, Alexander Vampilov, Elias Lönnrot and John Boynton Priestley, among others. Memorable roles in works by Estonian authors and playwrights include those of: Eduard Vilde, A. H. Tammsaare, Juhan Sütiste, Jaan Kross, Aino Undla-Põldmäe, Jaan Kruusvall and Mats Traat.

Beginning in 1990, Sööt was a lecturer at the Estonian Academy of Music and Theatre, and from 1996 until 2004, was an associate professor at the academy.

== Television, radio and film ==
Meeli Sööt made her film debut in a small role in the Kalju Komissarov directed Soviet-Estonian crime-drama Tavatu lugu for Tallinnfilm. This was followed by a starring role as Marta in the 1982 Veljo Käsper directed drama Pihlakaväravad, opposite actor Heino Mandri. She also appeared in the 1990 dramatic short film Teenijanna, directed by Veiko Jürisson.

In 1983, she appeared in the feature-length television sports film Küljetuul, directed by Raul Tammet. She also frequently appeared on the popular Estonian Kanal 2 television crime series Kelgukoerad between 2008 and 2011.

Additionally, she has performed in several radio plays, most memorably Kuu aega maal in 1964, Meelejahutaja in 1973 and Ameerika mäed in 1998.

== Personal life and death ==
In 1961 Meeli Alev married conductor and pedagogue Ants Sööt. The couple divorced in 1978. She died on 16 March 2024, at the age of 86.

== Acknowledgements ==
In 1976, Meeli Sööt was awarded the Merited Artist of the Estonian SSR.
