= Tiit Kuningas =

Estonian sport journalist (born 1949)

Tiit Kuningas (30 October 1949 – 27 November 2023) was an Estonian sports journalist.

He was born in Massiaru, Pärnu County. He studied at Tallinn Pedagogical Institute. In youth he exercised several sport disciplines, including basketball and volleyball.

As a sport journalist, he has contributed to several newspapers, including Spordileht, Postimees, and the magazine Sporditäht.

He has also been a successful quizzer. He was a member of the quiz team which participated on the ETV television program Naapurivisa in the late 1960s.

== Publications ==
- Olümpiamosaiik (1992)
- XXVI suveolümpiamängud (1996, one of the authors)
- Sport XX sajandil (2002, with Tiit Lääne)
- Torino 2006. XX taliolümpiamängud (2006, one of the authors)
