= Hans Leberecht =

Estonian author (1910–1960)

- Born: 1 December 1910; Saint Petersburg, Russia (then the Russian Empire)
- Died: 10 November 1960 (aged 49)
- Writing career
- Genre: Socialist realism

Hans Leberecht (1 December 1910 – 10 November 1960) was an Estonian writer. Many of his works mirrored socialist realism. His most important work is the story Valgus Koordis (1949).

== Life ==
Lebrerecht was born in Saint Petersburg and grew up in Koordi, Järva County.

In 1944 he joined the Communist Party. After World War II, he lived in Tallinn. He was a special correspondent for the newspaper Sovetskaya Estoniya.

== Works ==
- Koordis (1949 story)
- Kaptenid (1956 novel)
- Sõdurid lähevad koju (1957 novel)
- Vassarite paleed (1960 novel)
