= Estonian Chamber of Commerce and Industry =

Organization based in Estonia

- Founded: 1925
- Location: Estonia, Tallinn
- Region served: Estonia
- Key people: Toomas Luman, President
- Website: www.koda.ee (Estonian, English, Russian)

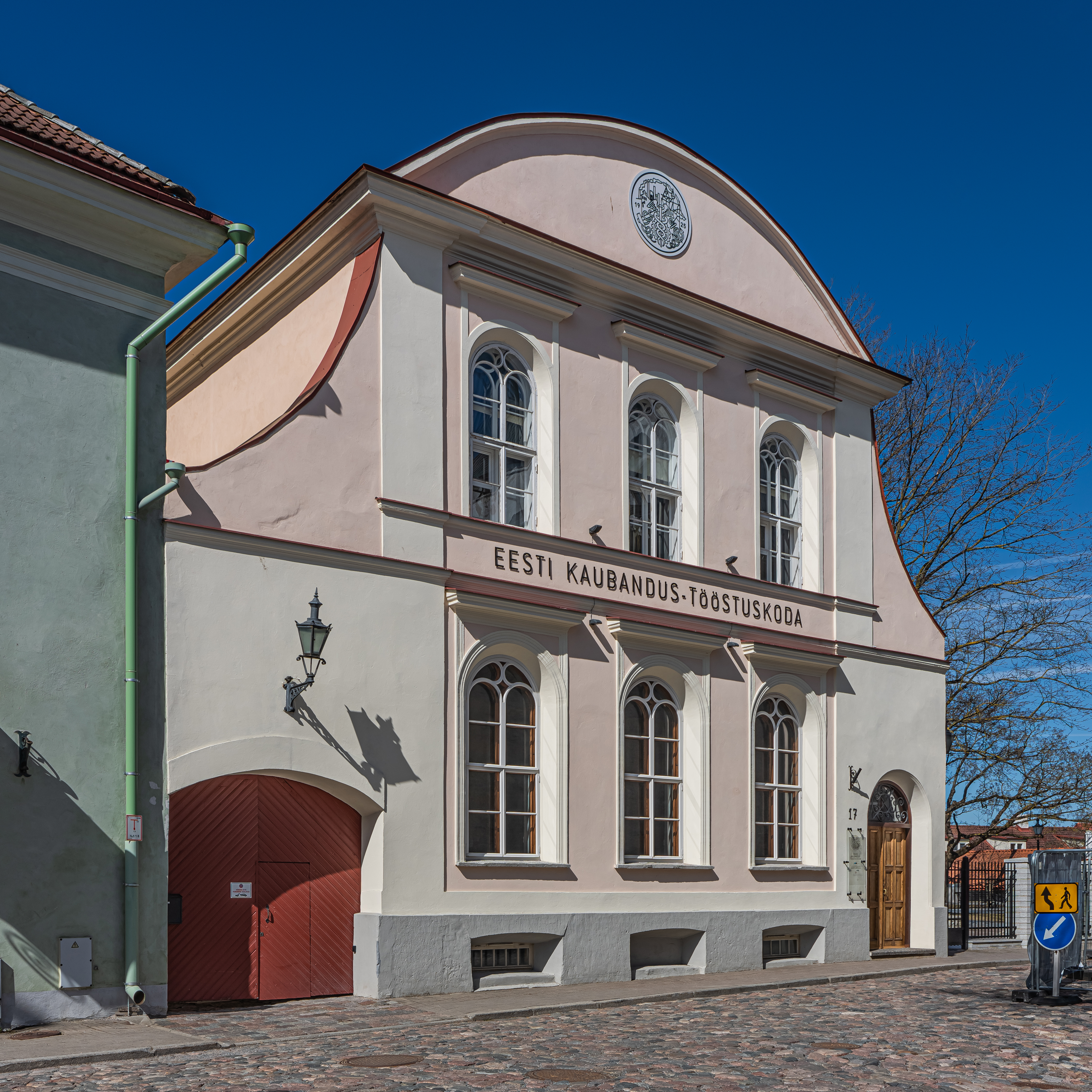
Estonian Chamber of Commerce and Industry, Tallinn, Toom-Kooli 17

The Estonian Chamber of Commerce and Industry (ECCI) is a business network in Estonia. The largest in the country, it has over 3000 members. The chamber has operated continuously since 1989. Originally established in 1925, it was closed down after 15 years during the Soviet occupation, resuming after re-independence in 1989.

== Organization ==
The ECCI is governed by a board of 15 people, with a president. Staff are employed at the main office in Tallinn, and also in regional offices in Pärnu (west coast), Tartu (south-east/central), Jõhvi (east) and Kuressaare (western isles).

== Services of the Estonian Chamber of Commerce and Industry ==
The services offered by the Chamber include consultations, issue of foreign trade documents, searching for cooperation partners, contact events, training and other activities necessary for business activities of entrepreneurs. In providing services, the Chamber is supported by competent personnel and diverse databases that contain information regarding companies, laws and regulations etc. The Chamber of Commerce pays a lot of attention to communication between the members and facilitating business activities.

== Publications ==
Publications include: Leading Brands of Estonia and Estonian Export Directory. The ECCI was involved in the creation of the national standards body for Estonia, known as Eesti Standardikeskus (EVS), as a non-profit association. EVS is recognised by the International Organization for Standardization.
