= Tiit Kuusmik =

Estonian politician (born 1950)

Tiit Kuusmik (born 3 March 1950 in Kiviõli) is an Estonian politician. He has been member of X and XI Riigikogu.

Since 2012, he has been the Mayor of Toila. He is a member of Estonian Centre Party.
