= Taikomochi =

Japanese entertainer

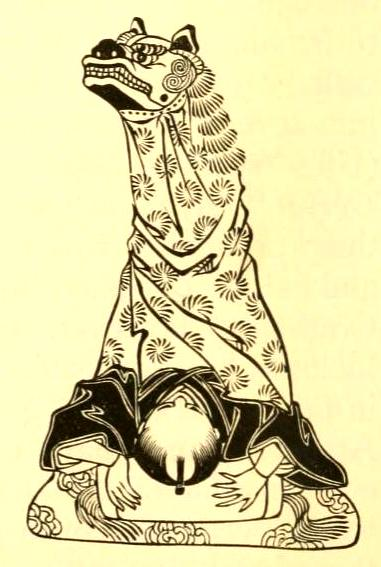
A taikomochi performing a lion dance with his feet. J. S. de Becker, 1899

Taikomochi (太鼓持), also known as hōkan (幇間), were the original male geisha of Japan.

== History ==
The Japanese version of the jester, taikomochi were once attendants to daimyō (feudal lords) from the 13th century, originating from the Ji sect of Pure Land Buddhism, which focused on dancing. These men both advised and entertained their lord and came to be known as doboshu ('comrades'), who were also tea ceremony connoisseurs and artists. By the 16th century, they became known as otogishu or hanashishu ('storytellers'), where they focused on storytelling, humour, and conversation. They were sounding boards for military strategies and they battled at the side of their lord.

A time of peace began in the 17th century and the otogishu and hanashishu no longer were required by their lords, and so they had to take on a new role. They changed from being advisors to becoming pure entertainers, and a number of them found employment with the oiran, high-class Japanese courtesans. Seisuisho ("Laughs to Banish Sleep"), a collection of comic stories written by Sakuden Anrakuan, was compiled during this time.

"Geisha" means "arts person", while hōkan was the formal name for "jester". "Taikomochi" was a less formal name for these men, which literally means "drum (taiko) bearer", though not all of them used the drum. It could also have been a corrupted way of saying "to flatter someone". These three terms came into use during the 17th century. In 1751 the first onna geisha (female geisha) arrived at a party and caused quite a stir. She was called geiko ("arts girl"), which is still the term for geisha in Kyoto today. By the end of the 18th century these onna geisha outnumbered taikomochi to the point that, having become so few in number, they became known as otoko geisha ("male geisha"). The geisha even took over from the yūjo due to their artistic skills, their contemporary outlook and their sophistication. The men continued to assist the women – this time the geisha – in the entertainment field.

== Decline ==
In Geisha: The Secret History of a Vanishing World, Lesley Downer wrote that in Yoshiwara in 1770, there were 16 female geisha and 31 male geisha. In 1775 there were 33 female geisha, but still 31 male geisha. But in 1800 there were 143 female geisha and 45 male geisha. The females started to take over the field and the role of the males was again changed – this time the males took on the role of supporting the women at parties.

There were between five or six hundred taikomochi in Japan during the peak of their popularity. Since then, the geisha have started to decline due to the popularity of the jokyu (café girls) in the 1920s and to westernisation. This in turn, caused the decline of the taikomochi. Their decline sped up with World War II, and the taikomochi continue to decline today. Although there are still small communities of geisha in Kyoto and Tokyo, there are only eight taikomochi in Japan. Four taikomochi are in Tokyo, one is in Kyoto.

== Taikomochi Shichiko ==
In Geisha: The Secret History of a Vanishing World, Lesley Downer interviewed taikomochi Shichiko, a taikomochi from Tokyo. She calls taikomochi the party masters who ensure that the guests have a fun time at the party by telling jokes, telling erotic tales and acting out skits, playing games and drinking sake. These parties, like with geisha, can be very expensive. Taikomochi Shichiko joked that "taikomochi agete suideno taikomochi" – that a man who spends all of his time and money on taikomochi will fall into ruin and his wife will kick him out, and he will have nothing left to do but become a taikomochi himself. Apparently this is why a lot of men became taikomochi in earlier times.

As part of his repertoire, Ms. Downer was shocked by one particular skit – one that is a classic erotic skit. The taikomochi pretends to be talking to a pretend danna (patron) who obviously wants to have sex. The taikomochi explains that he is not homosexual, and that he is called a geisha, but the pretend danna is impatient. So the taikomochi gives in to please the client, and acts out (half hidden by a screen) the sex with moans and rolling of eyes, until the climax. The taikomochi then gets a tissue to 'clean up'. The audience roared with laughter because they all knew that this was a joke, making fun of how geisha and taikomochi please their customers.

== Taikomochi Arai ==
The Kyoto taikomochi, Taikomochi Arai, wants to promote this traditional art both in Japan and around the world. He entertains at ozashiki (geisha parties) with maiko and geisha as well as striking out on his own, to try to keep his profession alive. He tells sophisticated erotic stories and is well versed in performing arts for the parties, keeping the party lively and fun for the guests. This sort of entertainment is grounded in the fertility related banquet (enkai) linked with the agriculture of ancient Japan. He also plays games at the ozashiki as well as acting out stories, singing or dancing – making a merry and enjoyable party for the guests.

Outside of these ozashiki, he responds to requests for his performance and appearance at various events including home parties for women which focus on the history and culture of ozashiki. He also gives lectures at the Asahi Culture Centers in Osaka and Kobe, writes newspaper columns and has his own radio show about Japan's traditional entertainment culture. He has also published a book, Ma no Gokui ("The Essence of Timing in Performing Arts"). He was involved with giving advice for the taikomochi character in the movie Nagasaki Burabura Bushi. He runs his own web site about his profession, and hopes to share the history and culture of the taikomochi with the world. He comments:

"However, unlike other showy traditional cultures appearing on the main stage, Taikomochi is a backstage one, which I have dared to pursue as my occupation, knowing that nobody can guarantee and protect it, but still receiving inquiries from top enterprise leaders for attendance at their traditional banquets, where they have shown interest in what I am doing, while trying to get business hints from their conversation with me during such entertainment sessions. I have also been encouraged to take pride in my business by receiving requests from young enterprise managers to give lectures on my experiences in the entertainment business involving human relations. I really hope that I will be able to continue to be of service to people somehow through my occupation".
