= Tallinn Jewish School =

School in Tallinn

Coordinates: 59.4386331°N 24.7660697°E

- Tallinna Juudi Kool
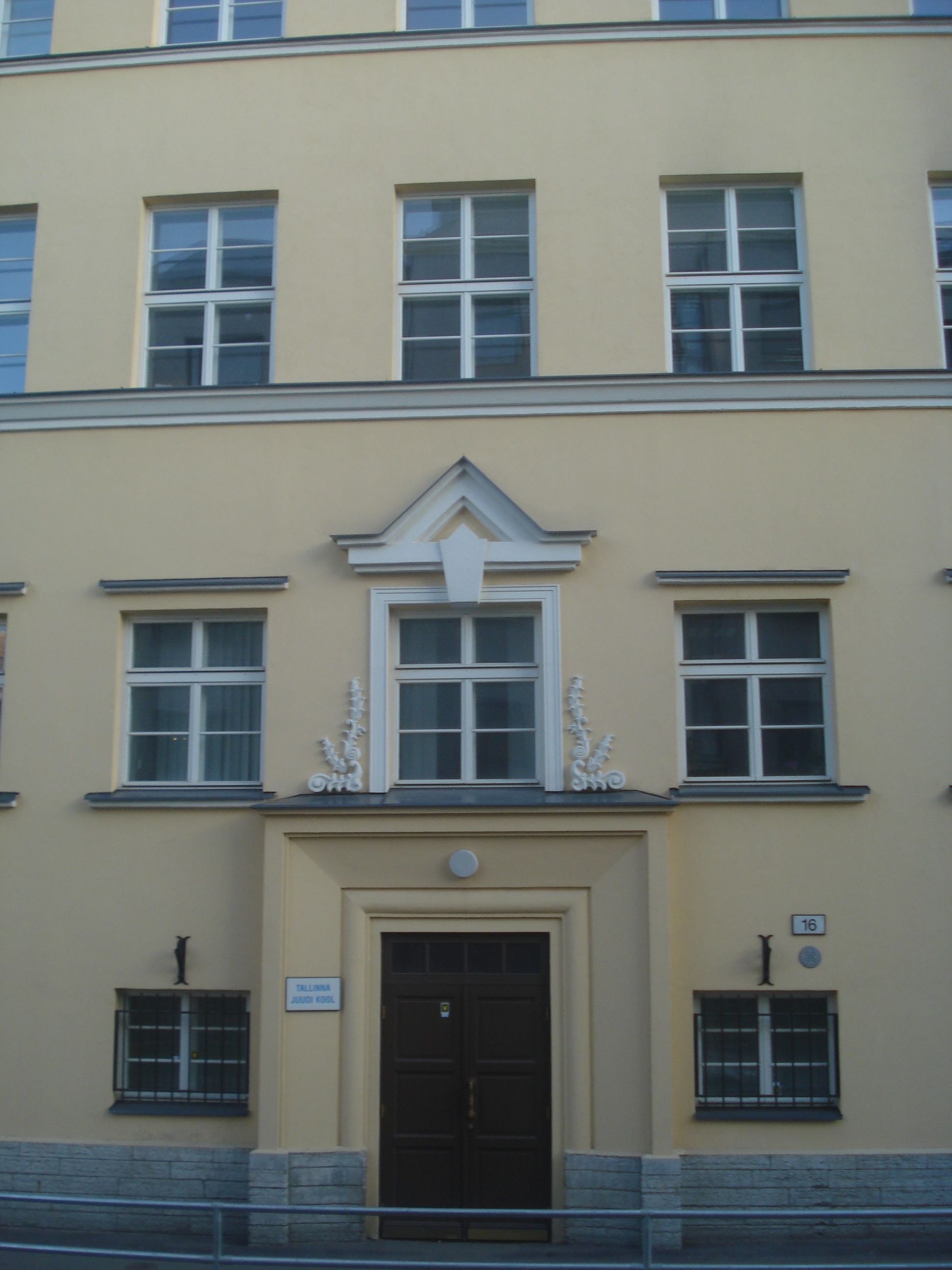
- Tallinn Jewish School

Location
- Karu 16; Tallinn; Estonia

Information
- Established: 1924
- Principal: Igor Lirisman
- Language: Russian
- Website: www.jkool.tln.edu.ee

Tallinn Jewish School (Estonian: Tallinna Juudi Kool) is a school in the center of Tallinn, Estonia.

== History ==
The Jewish School was built before World War II. When the war started the school was closed and the Sea Army center was there during the war and after war time. In 1990 the school was opened again with 350 pupils.

Samuel Gurin was director from 1925 until its closure in 1940. From the re-opening in 1990 to 1993, Avivia Gluhovskaja was the director. The headmaster from 1993 until 21 June 2009 was Mihhail Beilinson, and was followed by Samuel Golomb, who remained until 2010, when the current incumbent, Igor Lirisman, took over.

== Faculty and facilities ==
About 30 teachers are working in this school, and in addition one teacher of Hebrew who is sent from Israel. Every year, renovations are carried out at the school, but since the building is very old, there are a lot of problems with the main construction. The state cannot give money to school because it is property of the Jewish Community in Estonia.

Approximately 3000 Jews live in Estonia and most of them in Tallinn, but a lot of Jewish families send their children to normal schools, one of the reasons being that the school's teaching language is Russian, whereas it has been estimated that a third of the Estonian Jewish community speaks Estonian.

== See also ==
- Tallinn Synagogue
