= Kiviõli =

Town in northeastern Estonia

- Town
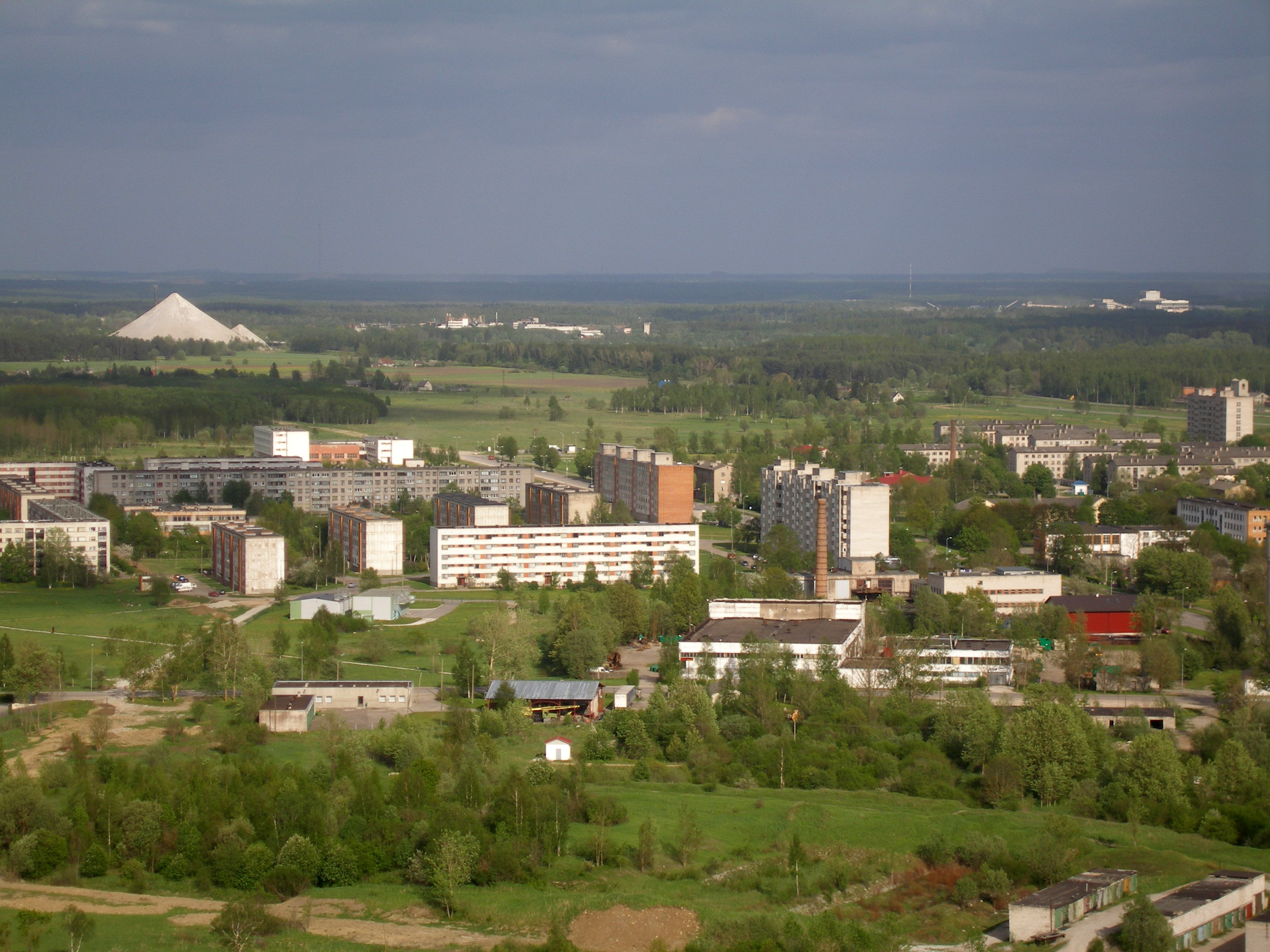

- Location in Estonia
- Coordinates: 59°21′N 26°58′E
- Country: Estonia
- County: Ida-Viru County
- Municipality: Lüganuse Parish
- Founded: 1922
- Town rights: 1946

Area
  - Total: 11.75 km^{2} (4.54 sq mi)

Population (2026)
  - Total: 4,645
  - Rank: 24th
  - Density: 395.3/km^{2} (1,024/sq mi)

Ethnicity
  - Estonians: 39.6%
  - Russians: 51.5%
  - other: 8.9%
- Time zone: UTC+2 (EET)
  - Summer (DST): UTC+3 (EEST)

Kiviõli (/ˌkɪviˈoʊli/ KIV-ee-OHL-ee; Estonian: [ˈkiviɤlʲi]) is an industrial town in Ida-Viru County, Estonia, established in 1922. The main industry in the town is oil shale mining, which gives the town its name.

== History ==
In 1922, the joint-stock company Eesti Kiviõli (lit. 'Estonian stone oil') established an oil shale quarry in land belonging to the village of Salaküla, and mining commenced in 1930. A worker's settlement belonging to the village of Varinurme was built in the 1930s and named Kiviõli after the joint-stock company. Kiviõli became a town in 1946.

== Demographics ==
Ethnic composition 1970–2021
Ethnicity	1959		1970		1979		1989		2000		2011		2021	
Ethnicity	amount	%	amount	%	amount	%	amount	%	amount	%	amount	%	amount	%
Estonians	6017	57.6	5789	51.9	4914	44.5	3958	38.1	2921	39.5	2179	38.7	1924	39.6
Russians	-	-	4431	39.7	5184	47.0	5369	51.7	3793	51.2	3020	53.6	2498	51.5
Ukrainians	-	-	152	1.36	228	2.06	308	2.96	157	2.12	109	1.93	136	2.80
Belarusians	-	-	93	0.83	139	1.26	184	1.77	119	1.61	79	1.40	69	1.42
Finns	-	-	368	3.30	348	3.15	308	2.96	193	2.61	100	1.77	68	1.40
Jews	-	-	13	0.12	11	0.10	10	0.10	3	0.04	2	0.04	0	0.00
Latvians	-	-	41	0.37	25	0.23	19	0.18	10	0.14	10	0.18	10	0.21
Germans	-	-	-	-	74	0.67	83	0.80	46	0.62	49	0.87	31	0.64
Tatars	-	-	-	-	13	0.12	26	0.25	14	0.19	7	0.12	6	0.12
Poles	-	-	-	-	26	0.24	22	0.21	11	0.15	7	0.12	7	0.14
Lithuanians	-	-	18	0.16	27	0.24	24	0.25	17	0.23	14	0.25	12	0.25
unknown	0	0.00	0	0.00	0	0.00	0	0.00	70	0.94	4	0.07	5	0.10
other	4427	42.4	248	2.22	61	0.55	79	0.76	51	0.69	54	0.96	86	1.77
Total	10444	100	11153	100	11050	100	10390	100	7405	100	5634	100	4854	99.9

== Neighborhoods of Kiviõli ==
Included in the town limits, but somewhat separate from the main part of the town, are the districts of Küttejõu and Varinurme.

There are five neighborhoods of Kiviõli:

- Küttejõu
- Lepatee
- Sala-Aru
- Soopealse
- Varinurme.
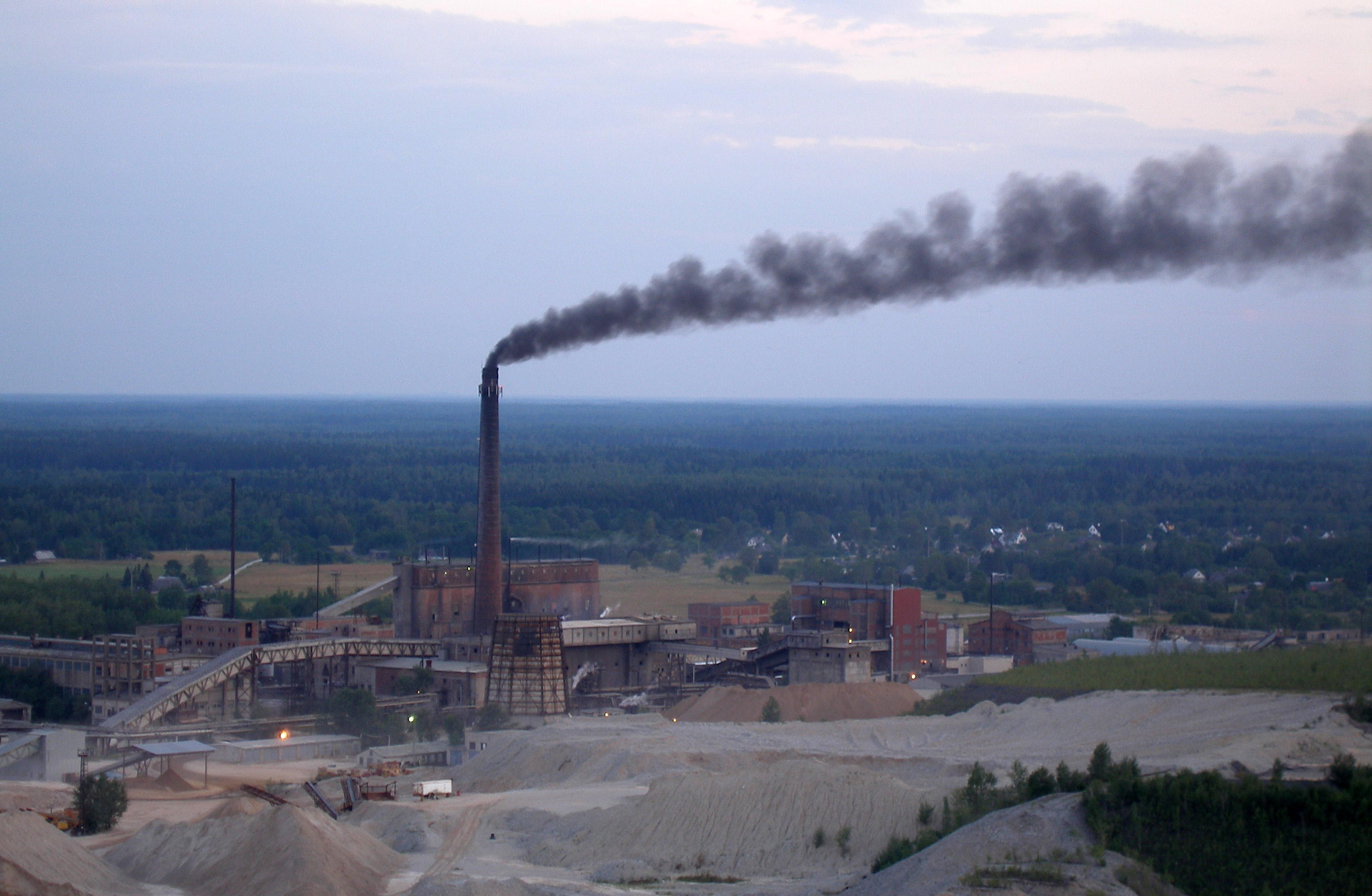
Kiviõli oil factory

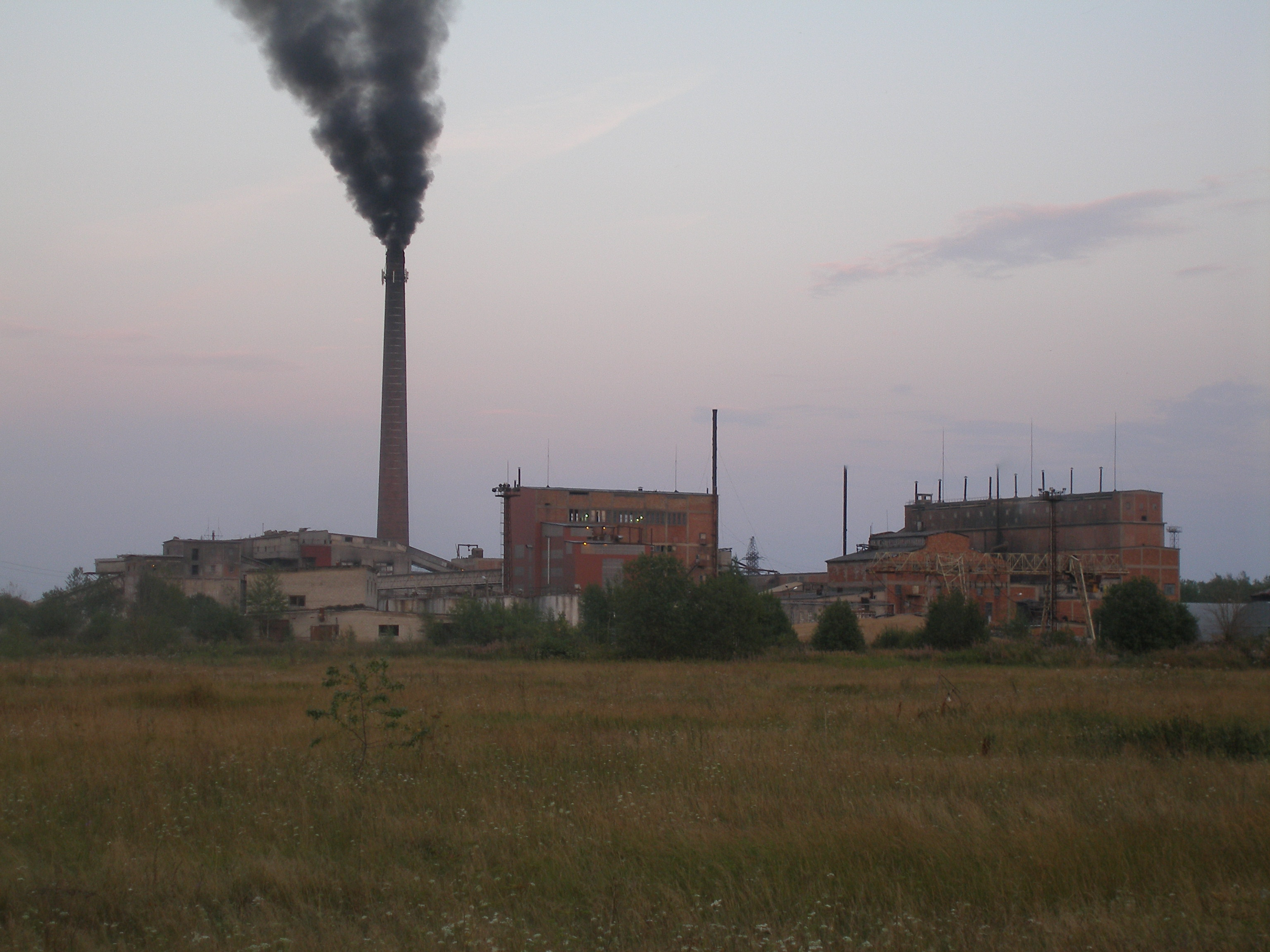

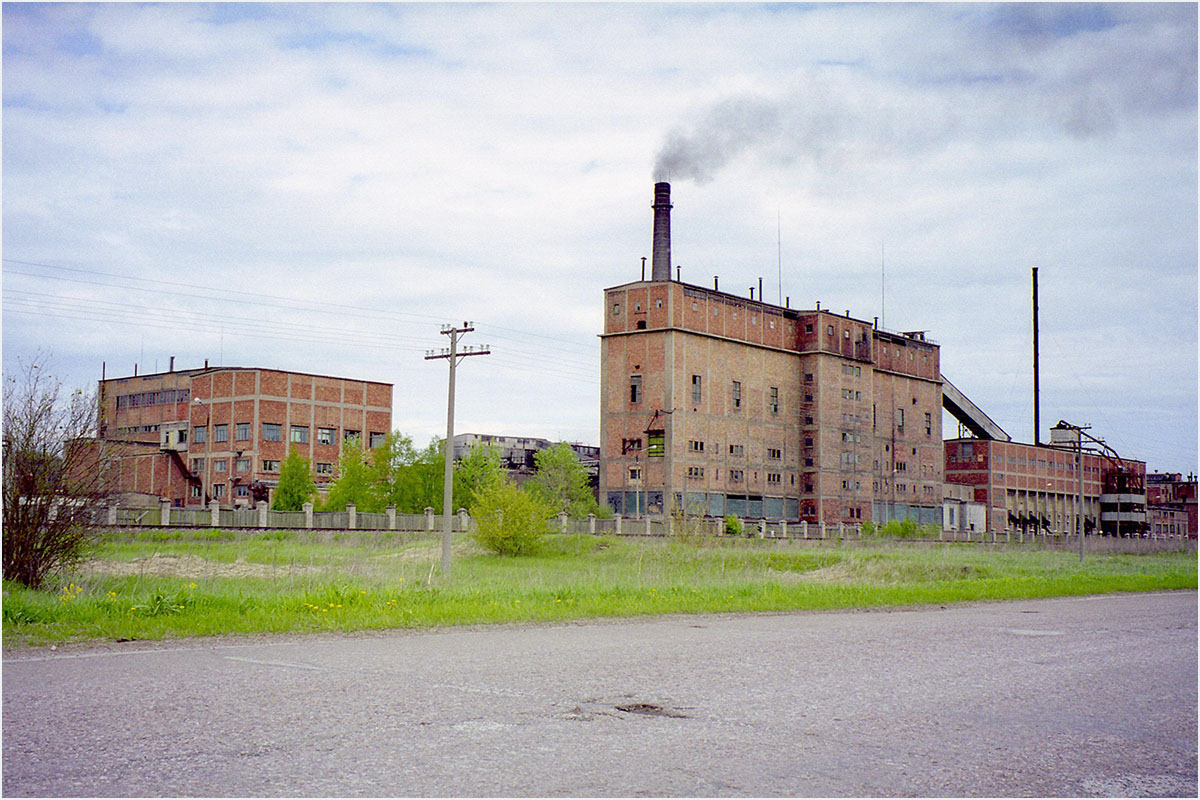

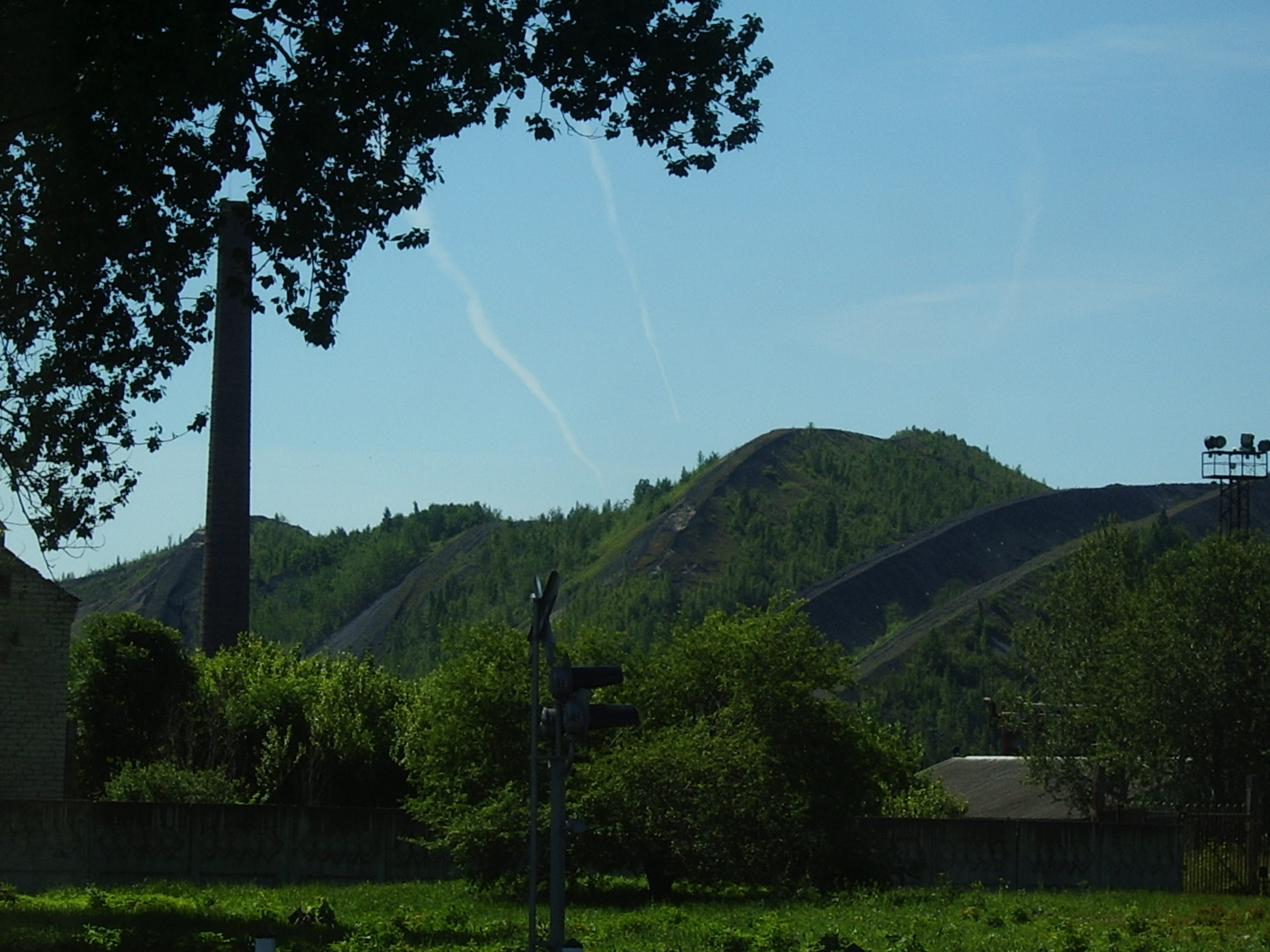
Ash mountains

== Notable people ==
Notable people that were born or lived in Kiviõli include the following:

- Ivi Kreen (born 1935), former TV presenter for Eesti Televisioon, from 1961 to 1990.
- Tiit Kuusmik (born 1950), politician, the Mayor of Toila since 2012
- Peeter Simm (1953 - 2026), film director
- Kristina Kallas (born 1976), politician Minister of Education and Research since 2023
- Tatjana Mannima (born 1980), cross-country skier, took part in the 2006, 2010 and 2018 Winter Olympics
- Dmitri Dmitrijev (born 1982), politician; Mayor of Kiviõli, 2007 to 2015

== See also ==
- Eesti Kiviõli
- Eesti Küttejõud
