= Ene-Margit Tiit =

Estonian mathematician and statistician

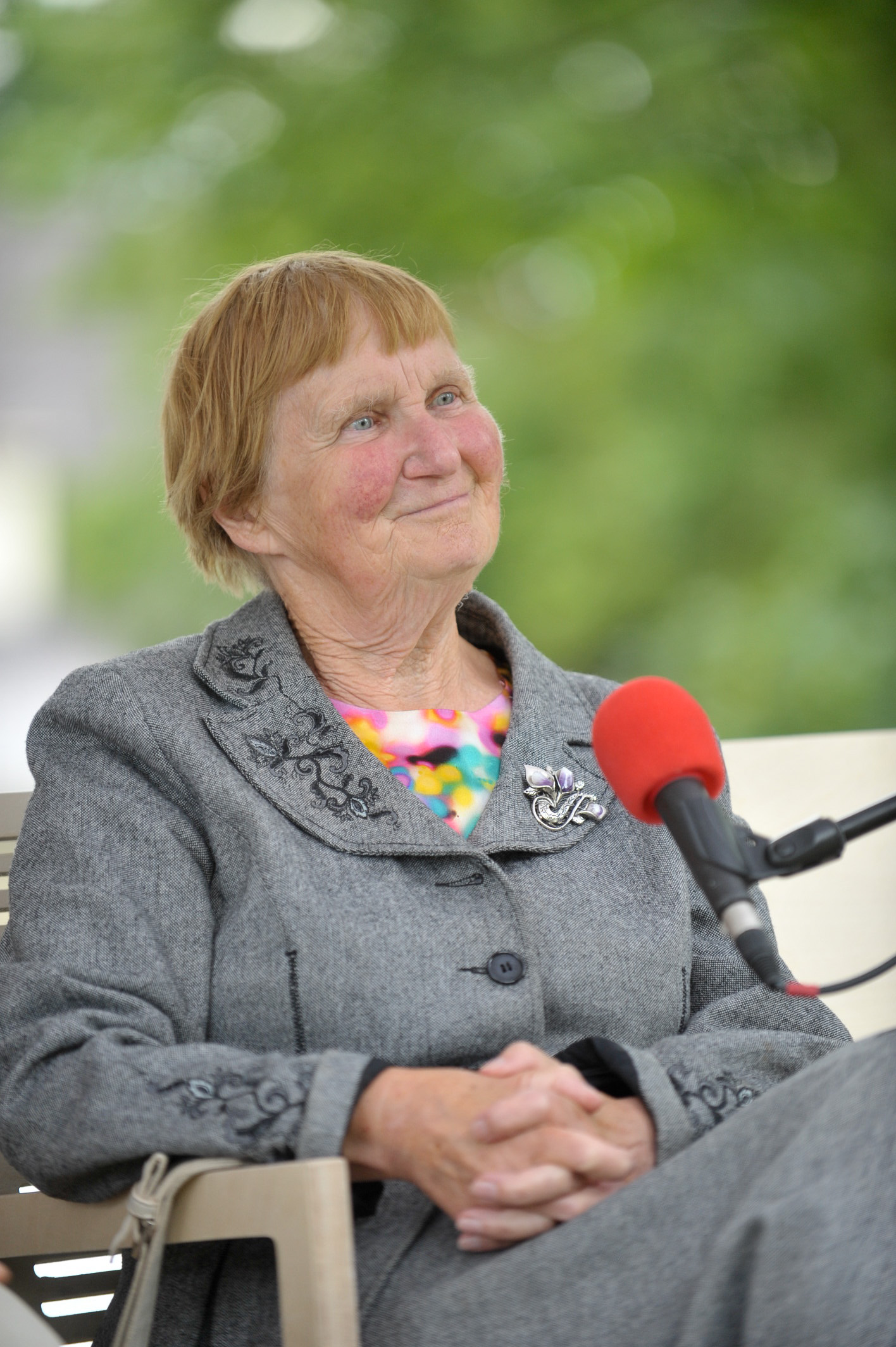
Tiit in 2014

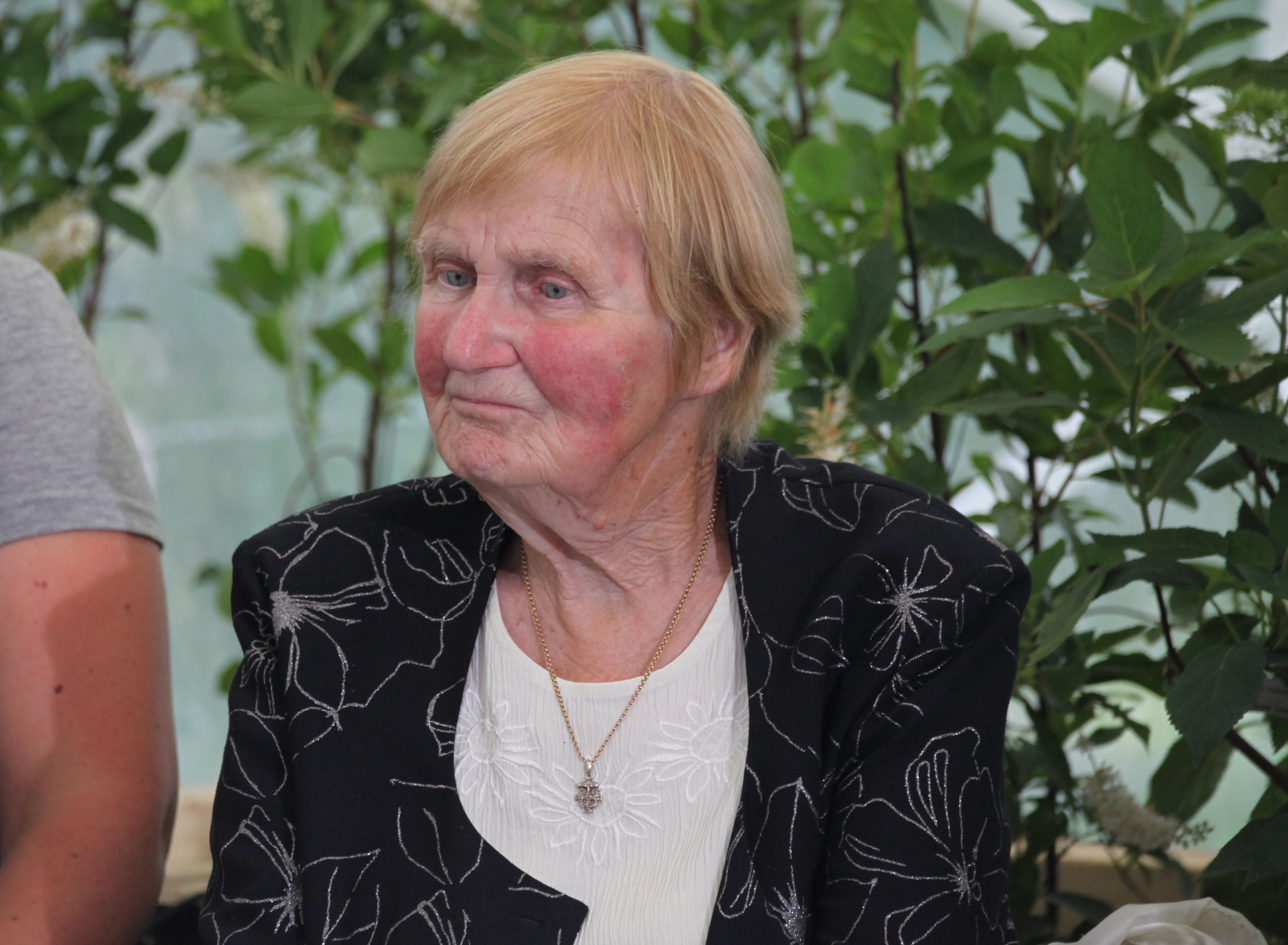
Ene-Margit Tiit at the Opinion Festival 2021 in Paide, Estonia

Ene–Margit Tiit (born 22 April 1934 in Tartu) is an Estonian mathematician and statistician who became the founding president of the Estonian Statistical Society.

== Early life and education ==
Tiit is the daughter of mathematician Arnold Humal and was born in Tartu on 22 April 1934. She went to a high school in Tallinn and completed her undergraduate studies in 1957 at the University of Tartu, then called Tartu State University. She remained at the same university for her doctoral work, defending a dissertation on Ridade ümberjärjestamisest (On rearrangements of series) in 1963 with Gunnar Kangro as her doctoral supervisor.

== Career ==
After briefly working at the Estonian Agricultural Academy before her doctorate, Tiit returned to the University of Tartu as a faculty member. There, the topics of her research included "mathematical statistics, population sciences, sociology and anthropology". She founded the Department of Mathematical Statistics there, and became its first regular professor. The Estonian Statistical Society was founded in September 1992, soon after the fall of the Soviet Union, and Tiit became its first president.

She retired in 1999, but continued to work as a senior methodologist for Statistics Estonia.

== Recognition ==
In 1995 the University of Helsinki gave Tiit an honorary doctorate. She is also a fourth class member of the Order of the White Star. She is an Elected Member of the International Statistical Institute.
