= Maila Rästas =

Estonian actress (1937–2008)

- Born: Maila Liivoja; 8 April 1937; Tartu, Estonia
- Died: 19 April 2008 (aged 71); Tallinn, Estonia
- Occupation: Actress
- Years active: 1960–1992
- Spouse: Kainu Rästas
- Children: 1

Maila Rästas (born Maila Liivoja; 8 April 1937 – 19 April 2008) was an Estonian stage, film, and radio actress. Rästas was employed at Estonian Drama Theatre in Tallinn from 1961 until 1992 before retiring. She also appeared in several films.

== Early life and education ==
Maila Rästas was born Maila Liivoja in Tartu to Paul and Elfriede Vilhelmine Liivoja (née Kasak). The family later relocated to the capital of Tallinn, where she graduated from Tallinn 7th Secondary School in 1955. Following secondary school, she enrolled in the Performing Arts Department of the Tallinn Conservatory (now, the Estonian Academy of Music and Theatre) to study acting under direction of actor and theatre pedagogue Voldemar Panso, graduating in 1961. Rästas' diploma production role was that of Isabel in Pedro Calderón de la Barca's The Phantom Lady. Her graduating classmates included Tõnu Aav, Meeli Sööt, Mati Klooren, Mikk Mikiver, Ines Aru, Jaan Saul, Madis Ojamaa, and Aarne Üksküla.

== Career ==
In 1961, shortly after graduation from the Tallinn Conservatory, Rästas began an engagement as an actress at the Estonian Drama Theatre in Tallinn which lasted until 1992, when she was laid off from the theatre. During her three decade-long engagement at the Estonian Drama Theatre she performed in numerous stage productions as an actress in works by such varied authors and playwrights as: Victor Rozov, Juhan Liiv, Peter Shaffer, Eugene O'Neill, Hugo Raudsepp, Ion Druță, August Strindberg, Oskar Luts, Konstantin Trenyov, Valentin Rasputin, Clare Boothe Luce, Françoise Sagan, Albert Camus, and Werner Schwab.

Rästas' most critically acclaimed performances with the Estonian Drama Theatre were the roles of Tiina in A. H. Tammsaare's Man and Man (1972), Natalia "Natasha" Ivanovna in Anton Chekhov's Three Sisters (1973), and Magda in Jaan Kruusvall's In the Colors of Clouds (1983).

In addition to roles in the theatre, Rästas also appeared in several films; her first was as the character Külliki in the 1960 Herbert Rappaport directed drama Vihmas ja päikeses, released by Tallinna Kinostuudio (now, Tallinnfilm). Her final film role was in the Valentin Kuik penned and directed 1992 Tallinnfilm drama Armastuse lahinguväljad.

Rästas' television career wasn't as prolific as her stage career, although several stage productions featuring Rästas were televised on Eesti Televisioon (ETV), including a 1974 production of Oscar Wilde's Lady Windermere's Fan in which she played the role of The Duchess of Berwick, and a 1979 production of Hermann Bahr's The Concert. She also had a small role in the 1981 Tõnis Kask directed ETV television biographical film Two Days from the Life of Viktor Kingissepp, which chronicled Estonian communist politician Viktor Kingissepp.

Rästas also performed in a number of radio plays during her career. The most notable of which was in the 1969 Raimond Kaugver penned and Leo Martin directed drama Vilve, which aired on Eesti Raadio.

Following her departure from the Estonian Drama Theatre in 1992, Rästas rarely pursued further work as an actress, preferring to live quietly in semi-retirement. She would occasionally take small roles in the intervening years, most notably opposite Ita Ever, Ülle Ulla, Liina Olmaru, Epp Eesapäev, and Ago-Endrik Kerge in a production of Agatha Christie's They Do It with Mirrors directed by Roman Baskin, which premiered at the House of Blackheads in Tallinn in April 2005 and subsequently performed at several theatres throughout Estonia shortly after.

== Personal life ==
Maila Liivoja married to Kainu Rästas while still a student at the Tallinn Conservatory. The couple had one child. After her departure from the Estonian Drama Theatre she settled for a time on a small farm near Vasalemma in Harju County. Later, she moved to an apartment in the Tallinn subdistrict of Kopli. Kainu Rästas died in 2007, and Maila Rästas died unexpectedly the following year in Tallinn, aged 71 and was buried in Pärnamäe Cemetery.

== Acknowledgements ==
- Meritorious Artist of the Estonian SSR (1986)
