= Tiit Lääne =

Estonian sportsman and sports journalist

- Born: October 21, 1958 (age 67); Jõgeva, Estonia
- Education: Tallinn Pedagogical Institute
- Occupations: Sports journalist, sportsman
- Known for: Sports journalism

Tiit Lääne (born 21 October 1958) is an Estonian sportsman and sports journalist.

He was born in Jõgeva. In 1986 he graduated from Tallinn Pedagogical Institute in physical education. In youth he exercised many sport disciplines, including decathlon and bandy. He was also a member of Estonian national bandy team.

His journalist career began in 1979. 1987-1992 he was special correspondent for newspaper Maaleht. He has been an editor for several newspapers, including Eesti Spordileht and Eesti Päevaleht.

He has also been active in politics. 2021-2021 he was the elder of Jõgeva Rural Municipality.

== Publications ==
- Tähetund (1990, one of the authors)
- Jõgeva spordi biograafiline leksikon (1992, one of the authors)
- Välis-Eesti spordielu 1940–1991 (2000)
- Sport XX sajandil (2002, one of the authors)
- Olümpiamängude ajalugu 1896–1916 (2004, one of the authors),
- Eesti spordi taskuentsüklopeedia (2010)
