= 1949 in Estonia =

- Decades: 1920s; 1930s; 1940s; 1950s; 1960s
- See also: Other events of 1949; Timeline of Estonian history

This article lists events that occurred during 1949 in Estonia.

== Incumbents ==
- First Secretary of the Communist Party of Estonia: Nikolai Karotamm (1944–1950)
- Chairman of the Presidium of the Supreme Soviet: Eduard Päll (1947–1950)

== Events ==
- 25–28 March – an extensive deportation campaign was conducted in Estonian SSR, Latvian SSR, and Lithuanian SSR. The Soviet authorities deported over 90,000 people from the Baltics to remote areas of the Soviet Union.

== Births ==
- 3 March – Jüri Allik, Estonian psychologist.
- 3 April – Ivo Eensalu, actor and stage director.
- 12 June – Ivo Linna, Estonian singer.
