= List of First Secretaries of the Central Committee of the Communist Party of Estonia =

The First Secretary of the Central Committee of the Communist Party of Estonia was the leader of the Communist Party of Estonia, which was in turn a branch of the Communist Party of the Soviet Union.

Below is a list of office-holders:

Image	Name	Entered office	Left office
	Karl Säre	August 28, 1940	1943?
	Nikolai Karotamm	September 3, 1941	March 26, 1950
	Johannes Käbin	March 26, 1950	July 26, 1978
	Karl Vaino	July 26, 1978	June 16, 1988
	Vaino Väljas	June 16, 1988	August 22, 1991

== Sources ==
- World Statesmen – Estonian Soviet Socialist Republic
