= Anton Vaino =

Russian diplomat and politician (born 1972)

- Антон Вайно
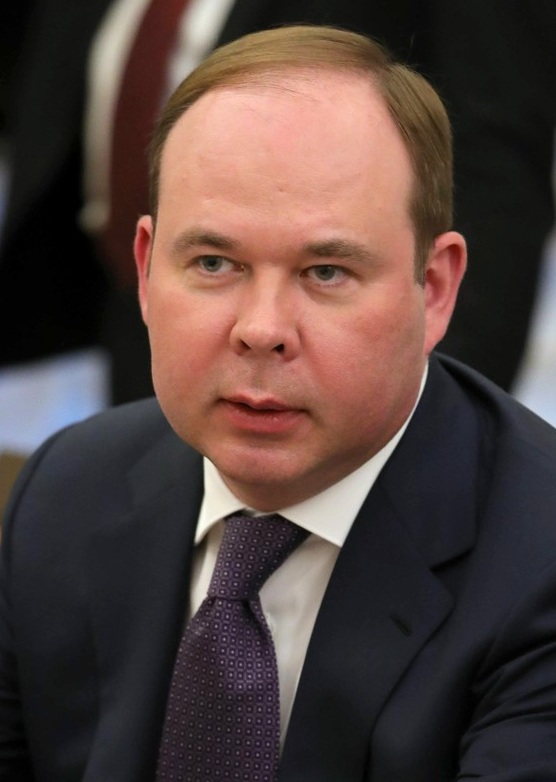
- Vaino in 2019

Chief of Staff of the President of Russia
- Incumbent
- Assumed office 12 August 2016
- President: Vladimir Putin
- Preceded by: Sergei Ivanov

Personal details
- Born: 17 February 1972 (age 54) Tallinn, Estonian SSR, Soviet Union
- Party: United Russia
- Relatives: Karl Vaino (grandfather)
- Education: Moscow State Institute of International Relations

Anton Eduardovich Vaino (Russian: Антон Эдуардович Вайно; born 17 February 1972) is a Russian diplomat and politician of Estonian descent. Currently he is the Chief of Staff of the Presidential Executive Office. Vaino is the grandson of Karl Vaino, the former First Secretary of the Communist Party of Estonia.

He has the federal state civilian service rank of 1st class Active State Councillor of the Russian Federation.

== Biography ==
Vaino graduated from the Moscow State Institute of International Relations in 1996, with a degree in international relations.

He worked in the Embassy of Russia in Tokyo and later in the Second Asian Department at the Russian Foreign Ministry. Vaino joined the Russian Presidential Protocol Directorate in 2002. He worked as deputy head of the Presidential Protocol Scheduling Directorate. He was named to first deputy head of this department in 2007, then deputy chief of the Government Staff, later chief of the Prime Minister's Protocol and deputy chief of the Government Staff in 2008.

In 2016 he claimed to invent a nooscope which he claimed was an instrument for analyzing the noosphere equivalent to a microscope in importance.

He is the author of Image of Victory, and has a published academic article, The Capitalization of the Future.

=== Sanctions ===
In February 2022, Vaino was put on the European Union sanctions list for "actively supporting and implementing actions and policies that undermine and threaten the territorial integrity, sovereignty and independence of Ukraine as well as the stability or security in Ukraine." On 6 April 2022, the Office of Foreign Assets Control of the United States Department of the Treasury added Vaino to its own sanctions list.

He was sanctioned by the UK government in 2022 in relation to the Russo-Ukrainian War.

== Personal life ==
Vaino is married and has a son.

== Awards and decorations ==
- Russian Federation Presidential Certificate of Honour (2012)
- Russian Federation Presidential Certificate of Gratitude (2005)

Political offices
Preceded by Sergei Ivanov	Chief of Staff of the Presidential Administration; 2016–present	Incumbent
