= 1952 in Estonia =

- Decades: 1930s; 1940s; 1950s; 1960s; 1970s
- See also: Other events of 1952; Timeline of Estonian history

This article lists events that occurred during 1952 in Estonia.

== Incumbents ==
First Secretary of the Communist Party of Estonia - Johannes Käbin

== Events ==
- Tallinn Pedagogical Institute was established.
- until 1953 – Estonian SSR is reorganized into three oblasts: Tallinn, Tartu, and Pärnu.

== Births ==
- 19 March – Joel Luhamets, clergyman
- 11 May – Eevi Paasmäe, politician
- 19 September – Rein Aedma, actor
