= 1940 in Estonia =

- Decades: 1920s; 1930s; 1940s; 1950s; 1960s
- See also: Other events of 1940; Timeline of Estonian history

This article lists events that occurred during 1940 in Estonia.

== Incumbents ==
- First Secretary of the Communist Party of Estonia Karl Säre

== Events ==
- 17 June – The Red Army occupied Estonia and Latvia.
- 21 July – New Estonian Parliament (loyal to Soviet powers) proclaimed Estonian SSR.
- 6 August – Estonia was unlawfully declared the Estonian SSR and was, against the law, incorporated into the Soviet Union.

== Births ==
- 19 February – Jaan Kiivit Jr., clergyman (d. 2005)
- 30 March – Ants Pauls, politician
- 30 April – Ülo Õun, sculptor (died 1988)
- 28 May – Aarand Roos, linguist, writer and diplomat (d. 2020)
