= Aleksander Ansberg =

Estonian politician

Aleksander Ansberg (27 February 1909 – 20 February 1975) was an Estonian politician. He was a member of the Communist Party of Estonia.

Ansberg was born in Gatchina, in the Tsarskoselsky Uyezd of the Saint Petersburg Governorate of the Russian Empire. He was Deputy Chairman of the Estonian SSR Council of Ministers 1950–1953, Chairman of the Executive Committee of the Tallinn Oblast Soviet 1953, Minister of Culture 1953–1963, Deputy Chairman of the Presidium of the Supreme Soviet of the Estonian Soviet Socialist Republic and Acting Chairman of the Presidium of the Supreme Soviet of the Estonian Soviet Socialist Republic 7 October – 22 December 1970. He died on 20 February 1975 in Tallinn.

== Orders ==
- 1950: Order of Lenin
- Two Orders of the Red Banner of Labour
- Order of the Badge of Honour

Political offices
Preceded by Aleksei Müürisepp	Chairman of Presidium of the Supreme Soviet of the Estonian SSR (acting); 1970	Succeeded by Artur Vader
