= Meta Vannas =

Soviet politician

Meta Vannas (born Meta Jürgenson, 1949–1975 Meta Jangolenko; 9 January 1924 – 25 November 2002) was an Estonian Soviet politician. She was a member of the Communist Party of Estonia.

== Biography ==
Vannas was born in Suuremõisa, Hiiu County. Following the German occupation of Estonia during World War II, she was imprisoned in Haapsalu and Tallinn and in 1944-1945 at Stutthof concentration camp. From 1940-1975, she was married to Mihhail Jangolenko.

She was the Minister of Public Service 1969–1975, Deputy Chairman of the Presidium of the Supreme Soviet of the Estonian Soviet Socialist Republic 1975 – 25 May 1978, Acting Chairman of the Presidium of the Supreme Soviet of the Estonian Soviet Socialist Republic 25 May 1978 – 26 July 1978 and Deputy Chairman of the Presidium of the Supreme Soviet of the Estonian Soviet Socialist Republic 26 July 1978 – 1985. She died in Tallinn, aged 78.

== Orders ==
- Order of Lenin

== Sources ==
- Female Leaders of Understate Entities
- World Statesmen.org

Political offices
Preceded by Artur Vader	Chairman of the Presidium of the Supreme Soviet of the Estonian SSR (acting); 1978	Succeeded by Johannes Käbin
