= 1955 in Estonia =

- Decades: 1930s; 1940s; 1950s; 1960s; 1970s
- See also: Other events of 1955; Timeline of Estonian history

This article lists events that occurred during 1955 in Estonia.

== Events ==
- 19 July – Estonian Television (ETV) began broadcasting.

== Births ==
- 23 April – Urmas Ott, Estonian television and radio journalist
- 25 April – Pavel Starostin, Estonian politician
- 7 July – Urmas Laht, Estonian politician
