= 1954 in Estonia =

- Decades: 1930s; 1940s; 1950s; 1960s; 1970s
- See also: Other events of 1954; Timeline of Estonian history

This article lists events that occurred during 1954 in Estonia.

== Incumbents ==
First Secretary of the Communist Party of Estonia – Johannes Käbin

== Events ==
- Russian Cultural Center in Tallinn was opened.

== Births ==
- 11 January – Jaak Aaviksoo, politician and physicist
- 6 February – Aare Laanemets, actor and theatre director (d. 2000)
- 11 October – Arno Liiver, actor (d. 2026)

== Deaths ==
- January 8 – Eduard Wiiralt, Estonian artist (b. 1898)
