= 1946 in Estonia =

- Decades: 1920s; 1930s; 1940s; 1950s; 1960s
- See also: Other events of 1946; Timeline of Estonian history

This article lists events that occurred during 1946 in Estonia.

== Incumbents ==
First Secretary of the Communist Party of Estonia – Nikolai Karotamm

== Events ==
- Institute of Theology of Estonian Evangelical Lutheran Church was established.
- Estonian SSR Academy of Sciences is established.

== Births ==
- 28 March - Jaan Tooming, actor
- 11 May – Ago Roo, actor
- 21 July – Jüri Tarmak, high jumper, Olympic winner in 1972
- 23 August - Toivo Uustalo, politician
- 26 August - Priit Pärn, animation director
- 6 November – Viivi Luik, writer
