= 1950 in Estonia =

- Decades: 1930s; 1940s; 1950s; 1960s; 1970s
- See also: Other events of 1950; Timeline of Estonian history

This article lists events that occurred during 1950 in Estonia.

== Incumbents ==
Nikolai Karotamm

== Events ==
- March – Estonian Communist Party was gone under Moscow control. Many intellectuals were fired and replaced by "leading workers". These "leading workers" were imported from USSR.
- 1 October – administrative reform: counties were replaced by rural rayons.

== Births ==
31 July – Olav Ehala, composer
