= 1944 in Estonia =

- Decades: 1920s; 1930s; 1940s; 1950s; 1960s
- See also: Other events of 1944; Timeline of Estonian history

This article lists events that occurred during 1944 in Estonia.

== Incumbents ==
- Nikolai Karotamm - First Secretary of the Communist Party of Estonia

== Events ==
- Otto Tief was captured by Soviet forces; Jüri Uluots and members of the Tief government escaped to Sweden.
- 30 January – Battle of Narva: The first Soviet units crossed Estonian border.
- 24 February – Battle of Narva: Estonian volunteers launched a counterattack at Narva river.
- 6 March – World War II: Soviet Army planes attack Narva in Estonia, destroying almost the entire old town.
- 9 March – World War II: Soviet Army planes attack Tallinn, Estonia.
- 26 July – Battle of Narva: The Soviets captured Narva.
- 29 July – Battle of Tannenberg Line: The Estonian and German counterattack stopped Soviet advance towards Tallinn.
- 26 August – The Soviets captured most of Tartu, what became frontline city for almost a month.
- September – although German troops were expelled from Estonia, the local anti-Soviet movement (so called Forest Brothers) organized small-scaled armed resistance against Soviet regime.
- 18 September – Jüri Uluots, prime minister in capacity of president of Estonia, asks Otto Tief to form a government on the eve of the withdrawal of German forces; official gazette published proclaiming the Tief government.
- 20 September – Otto Tief attempts to organise the defence of Tallinn against the arrival of the Red Army two days later.
- 22 September – The Soviets captured Tallinn.
- 19 December – The entire territory of Estonia was captured by the Red Army.

== Births ==
- 26 January – Helle-Reet Helenurm, actress (died 2003)
- 3 July – Viiu Härm, actress
- 10 October – Lii Tedre, actress

== Deaths ==
- August 26 Hans Leesment, Estonian general (b. 1873)
- November 22 Johan Pitka, Estonian entrepreneur, sea captain and admiral (b. 1872)
