= 1951 in Estonia =

- Decades: 1930s; 1940s; 1950s; 1960s; 1970s
- See also: Other events of 1951; Timeline of Estonian history

This article lists events that occurred during 1951 in Estonia.

== Incumbents ==
Johannes Käbin

== Events ==
- Estonian Agricultural Academy was found.
