= 1960 in Estonia =

- Decades: 1940s; 1950s; 1960s; 1970s; 1980s
- See also: Other events of 1960; Timeline of Estonian history

This article lists events that occurred during 1960 in Estonia.

== Events ==
- July 21 – Tallinn Department Store was opened.

== Births ==
- 24 June – Kaja Tael, philologist, translator and diplomat
- 23 November – Karl Madis, musician
