= 1948 in Estonia =

- Decades: 1920s; 1930s; 1940s; 1950s; 1960s
- See also: Other events of 1948; Timeline of Estonian history

This article lists events that occurred during 1948 in Estonia.

== Incumbents ==
- Nikolai Karotamm – First Secretary of the Communist Party of Estonia

== Events ==
- Newspaper Edasi was found.
- March – Massive formation of kolkhozes begins.
- 25 March – second deportation. Over 20,500 people are sent to Siberia.

== Births ==
- 2 October – Siim Kallas, Estonian politician
