= Artur Vader =

Estonian Soviet politician (1920–1978)

Artur Vader (16 February 1920 – 25 May 1978) was the Chairman of the Presidium of the Supreme Soviet of the Estonian Soviet Socialist Republic from 1970 – 1978. He was born in Gorbovo, Liozna District, Vitebsk Region, Byelorussian SSR.

He served as the First Secretary of the Tallinn City Committee of the Communist Party of Estonia from 1952 to 1959. Between 1963 and 1964, he was the chairman of the Committee of Party and State Control, as well as the Chairman of the Council of Ministers of the Estonian SSR. In 1970, he became the chairman of the Presidium of the Supreme Soviet of the Estonian SSR. In 1966, he was appointed a candidate member of the Central Committee of the CPSU, a position he held until 1971.

== Awards ==
- Order of Lenin (1965)
- Two Orders of the Red Banner of Labour (1970)
- Order of the October Revolution (1973)
- Order of Glory, 3rd class

Political offices
Preceded by Aleksander Ansberg	Chairman of the Presidium of the Supreme Soviet of the Estonian SSR; 1970–1978	Succeeded by Meta Vannas
