= Jüri Saar =

Jüri Saar may refer to:

- Jüri Saar (Estonian politician, born 1946), Estonian politician
- Jüri Saar (Estonian politician, born 1956), Estonian politician and criminologist
