= 1956 in Estonia =

- Decades: 1930s; 1940s; 1950s; 1960s; 1970s
- See also: Other events of 1956; Timeline of Estonian history

This article lists events that occurred during 1956 in Estonia.

== Events ==
- Kalevi Keskstaadion was built.

== Births ==
- 1 October – Andrus Ansip, politician
- 21 October – Jüri Saar, politician
- 25 November – Kalle Randalu, pianist
