= 1961 in Estonia =

- Decades: 1940s; 1950s; 1960s; 1970s; 1980s
- See also: Other events of 1961; Timeline of Estonian history

This article lists events that occurred during 1961 in Estonia.

== Events ==
- 1 December – Tallinn Botanic Garden was established.
- Construction of Õismäe (subdivision of Tallinn) starts. Construction is ended 1973.

== Births ==
- 22 April - Alo Mattiisen, composer
- 2 October - Jaan Toomik, video artist, painter, and filmmaker

== Deaths ==
- 14 January - Herman Aav, head of Finnish Orthodox Church
- 4 April - Harald Riipalu, commander in the German Wehrmacht and the Waffen-SS during World War II
- 20 April - Ado Vabbe, painter
- 14 September - Ernst Gustav Kühnert, architect and art historian
