= 1957 in Estonia =

- Decades: 1930s; 1940s; 1950s; 1960s; 1970s
- See also: Other events of 1957; Timeline of Estonian history

This article contains an event and a birth from 1957 in Estonia.

== Events ==
The system of Ministries of Industry in the USSR, including ESSR, is replaced by the Councils of National Economy (Sovnarkhoz).

== Births ==
- July 21 – Sulev Keedus, film director
- December 2 – Raivo Kallas, politician
- December 16 – Aivar Kala, politician
