= 1941 in Estonia =

- Decades: 1920s; 1930s; 1940s; 1950s; 1960s
- See also: Other events of 1941; Timeline of Estonian history

This article lists events that occurred during 1941 in Estonia.

== Events ==
- German troops took with help of the Forest Brothers Estonia over from the Soviets.
- 14 June – mass deportations by Soviet Union authorities take place in Estonia, Latvia and Lithuania.
- 22 June – Germany attacked Soviet Union, Estonian partisans (Forest Brothers) started revolting in Southern Estonia.
- July – German troops enter Estonia.
- 28 August – sinking of a Soviet steamer with 3500 Soviet-mobilized Estonian men on board, 598 of them died.
- 1 December – Self-government of Estonia, headed by Hjalmar Mäe, is appointed by German military administration.

== Births ==
- 22 January – Jaan Kaplinski, writer
- 25 November – Tiit Lilleorg, actor (d. 2021)
- 4 December – Leila Säälik, Estonian actress
- 6 December – Evald Hermaküla, Estonian actor and director (died 2000)
