= 1945 in Estonia =

- Decades: 1920s; 1930s; 1940s; 1950s; 1960s
- See also: Other events of 1945; Timeline of Estonian history

This article lists events that occurred during 1945 in Estonia.

== Events ==
- World War II aftermaths: 282,000 dead people (about 1/4 of population of Estonia).
- Arrests, nationalization of industry.
- Guerilla warfare was intensified. About 15,000 men in underground and in the forests (Forest Brothers).

== Births ==
- 21 December – Mari Lill, actress
