= 1953 in Estonia =

- Decades: 1930s; 1940s; 1950s; 1960s; 1970s
- See also: Other events of 1953; Timeline of Estonian history

This article lists events that occurred during 1953 in Estonia.

== Events ==
- Guerrilla warfare (Forest Brothers) was practically reduced (was widespread since in 1945).
