= Kaja Tael =

Estonian philologist and diplomat

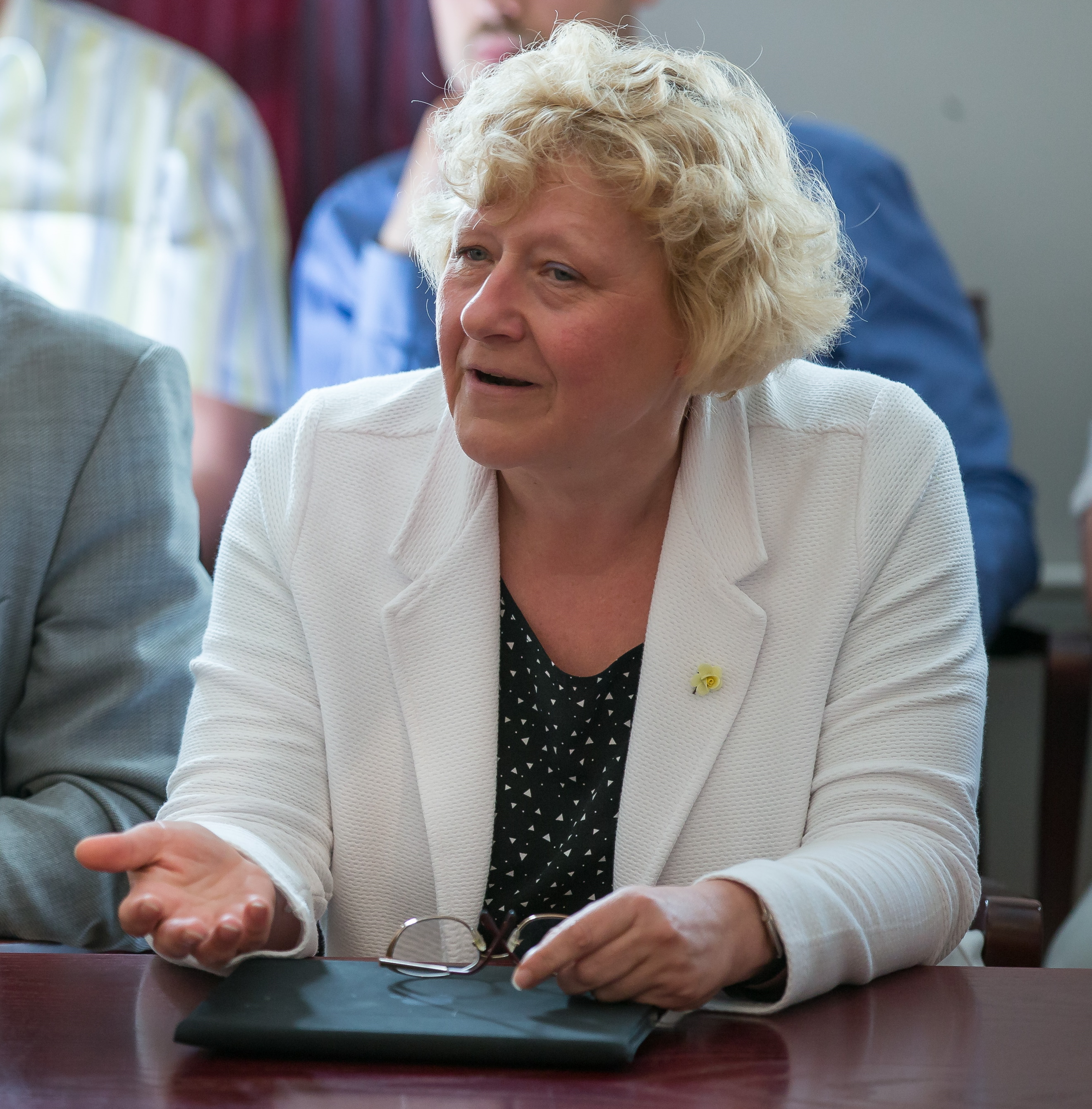
- Kaja Tael in 2015
- Born: 24 June 1960 (age 65); Tallinn, then part of Estonian SSR, Soviet Union
- Occupations: Philologist, translator, diplomat
- Years active: 1983–present

Kaja Tael (born 24 June 1960) is an Estonian philologist, translator, and diplomat. She is a former Estonian ambassador to the United Kingdom and to Germany, the Estonian Ambassador and Permanent Representative to the European Union, and the current Estonian Ambassador at Large for Climate and Energy Policy. In 2023, she became the Estonian ambassador to the Organization for Security and Co-operation in Europe (OSCE).

== Early life and career ==
Kaja Tael was born in Tallinn in 1960. She graduated in 1983 from Tartu State University with a degree in philology. In 1989, she received a PhD in Estonian language and literature.

From 1991 until 1995, Tael was the head of the Eesti Instituut, the Estonian cultural institute. From 1995 until 1998, she worked as a foreign policy advisor to President of Estonia Lennart Meri. Between 1998 and 2001, she joined the Estonian Ministry of Foreign Affairs, serving as Executive Secretary of the Estonian-Russian Intergovernmental Commission and then as Director General of the Policy Planning Department.

From 2001 until 2006, she was the Estonian ambassador to the United Kingdom of Great Britain and Northern Ireland. From 2006 until 2012, she was the Vice-Chancellor of the Committee on European Union Affairs, and then of European and Trans-Atlantic Relations at the Estonian Ministry of Foreign Affairs. From 2012 until 2016, she was the Estonian ambassador to Germany, succeeding Mart Laanemäe. Since 2016, she is the Estonian Ambassador and Permanent Representative to the European Union.

On 1 January 2020, Tael became the Estonian Ambassador at Large for Climate and Energy Policy.

In 2023, Tael became the Estonian ambassador to the Organization for Security and Co-operation in Europe (OSCE), presenting her credentials to the Secretary General of the OSCE Helga Schmid in September of that year.

== Acknowledgements ==
- Order of the White Star, III Class (2000)
- Order of the National Coat of Arms, III Class (2018)
