= List of chairmen of the Presidium of the Supreme Soviet of the Estonian Soviet Socialist Republic =

The chairman of the Presidium of the Supreme Soviet of the Estonian Soviet Socialist Republic was the highest official in the Estonian Soviet Socialist Republic, which was in turn a part of the Soviet Union.

Below is a list of office-holders:

| Image | Name | Entered office | Left office |
|---|---|---|---|
| | Johannes Vares (1890–1946) | August 25, 1940 | November 29, 1946 |
| | Nigol Andresen (acting) (1899–1985) | November 29, 1946 | March 5, 1947 |
| | Eduard Päll (1903–1989) | March 5, 1947 | July 4, 1950 |
| | August Jakobson (1904–1963) | July 4, 1950 | February 4, 1958 |
| | Johan Eichfeld (1893–1989) | February 4, 1958 | October 12, 1961 |
| | Aleksei Müürisepp (1902–1970) | October 12, 1961 | October 7, 1970 |
| | Aleksander Ansberg (acting) (1909–1975) | October 7, 1970 | December 22, 1970 |
| | Artur Vader (1920–1978) | December 22, 1970 | May 25, 1978 |
| | Meta Vannas (acting) (1924–2002) | May 25, 1978 | July 26, 1978 |
| | Johannes Käbin (1905–1999) | July 26, 1978 | April 8, 1983 |
| | Arnold Rüütel (1928–2024) | April 8, 1983 | March 29, 1990 |

== See also ==
- President of Estonia
- List of chairmen of the Council of Ministers of the Estonian Soviet Socialist Republic

== Sources ==
- World Statesmen – Estonian Soviet Socialist Republic
