= 1947 in Estonia =

- Decades: 1920s; 1930s; 1940s; 1950s; 1960s
- See also: Other events of 1947; Timeline of Estonian history

The following events occurred in Estonia in 1947.

== Events ==
- 22 September – Bronze Soldier of Tallinn was unveiled.
- Collectivization and mass deportations took place (intensively until March 1949).

== Births ==
- 10 January – Tiit Vähi, politician and businessman
- 12 February — Rein Kask, politician
- 24 March – Arnold Kimber, politician
- 4 December – Tõnu Kark, actor
