= 1942 in Estonia =

- Decades: 1920s; 1930s; 1940s; 1950s; 1960s
- See also: Other events of 1942; Timeline of Estonian history

This article lists events that occurred during 1942 in Estonia.

== Events ==
- 28 August – Estonian Legion is starting to form.
- Bombing by Soviets.

== Births ==
- 9 February – Ada Lundver, actress (d. 2011)
- 15 November – Hans Kaldoja, actor (d. 2017)
