= 1959 in Estonia =

- Decades: 1930s; 1940s; 1950s; 1960s; 1970s
- See also: Other events of 1959; Timeline of Estonian history

This article lists events that occurred during 1959 in Estonia.

== Events ==
- Tallinn Song Stage was built.
- Tallinn Bus Station moved to its current location from the Stalin Square (Viru Square).
- Population: 283,071.

== Births ==
- 3 February – Laine Mägi, actress
- 11 March – Margus Oopkaup, actor (died 2025)
