= 1958 in Estonia =

Estonia Events during 1958

- Decades: 1930s; 1940s; 1950s; 1960s; 1970s
- See also: Other events of 1958; Timeline of Estonian history

This article lists events that occurred during 1958 in Estonia.

== Events ==
- 1st Moonsund Regatta took place.

== Births ==
- 9 August – Arvo Kukumägi, actor (d. 2017)
