= 1943 in Estonia =

- Decades: 1920s; 1930s; 1940s; 1950s; 1960s
- See also: Other events of 1943; Timeline of Estonian history

This article lists events that occurred during 1943 in Estonia.

== Events ==
- Bombing by Soviets.
- March 25 – the ship Bungsberg was sunk.
