= 1939 in Estonia =

- Decades: 1910s; 1920s; 1930s; 1940s; 1950s
- See also: Other events of 1939; Timeline of Estonian history

This article lists events that occurred during 1939 in Estonia.

== Incumbents ==
- President – Konstantin Päts
- Prime Minister – Jüri Uluots

== Events ==
- 7 June – German–Estonian Non-Aggression Pact is signed.
- 23 August – Molotov–Ribbentrop Pact was signed, promising mutual non-aggression between Germany and the Soviet Union and agreeing to a division of much of Europe between those two countries.
- 28 September – Soviet Union coerces Estonia to sign Soviet–Estonian Mutual Assistance Treaty. According to the pact, Soviet Union can establish military bases in Estonia.

== Births ==
- 1 June – Ines Aru, actress
- 23 July – Raine Karp, architect
- 18 October – Salme Poopuu, actress and filmmaker (died 2017)
