= Yestonians =

Ethnic slur denoting Soviet cadres brought from Russia to Estonia after WW II

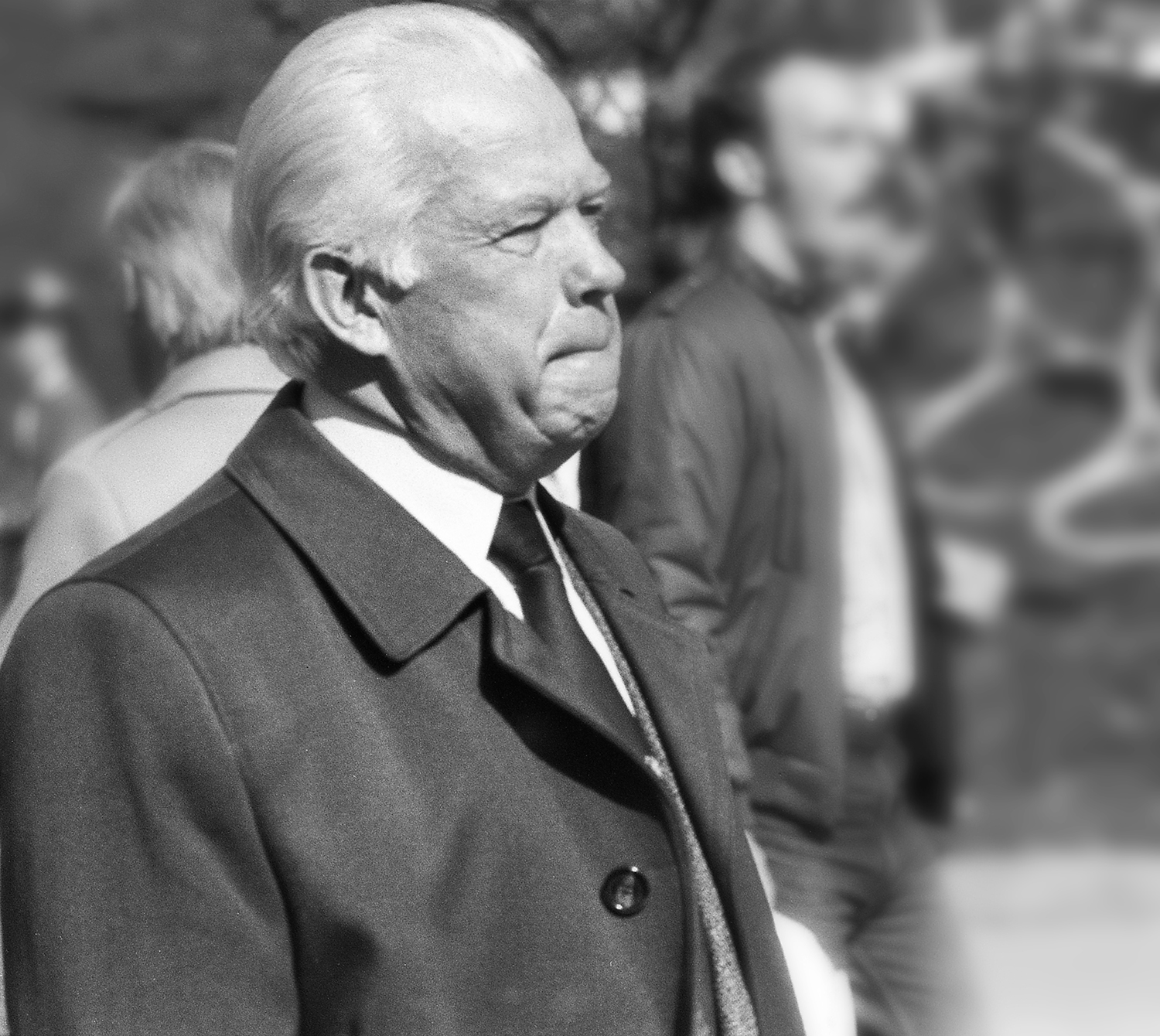
Karl Vaino, a noted "Yestonian," in 1987

Yestonians (Estonian: jeestlased [ˈjeːstlɑsɛd], singular: jeestlane [ˈjeːstlɑnɛ]; Russian: естонцы, romanized: yestontsy) was a derogatory epithet for historically ethnic Estonians brought from Russia to Estonia after World War II to staff the political structures of Soviet Estonia with cadres loyal to Moscow. While their ethnicity was Estonian by descent, they grew up in the Russian/Soviet environment, which meant that for many, the primary language was Russian (the ethnic Estonian language was a second language), which made them prone to apply Russian-language pronunciation rules in their Estonian-language speech.

The term thus relates to and derides the heavy Russian accent of these people and their practical inability to speak Estonian. In particular, the word "Estonians" was mispronounced from eestlased to jeestlased [yeestlɑsed], due to the iotation of the letter E characteristic in Russian, serving as the origin of the epithet.

While some of them tried to Estonianize, such as Ivan Kebin, who renamed himself to Johannes Käbin and notably improved his command of Estonian, most others remained Russian by culture and language.

In the 21st century the term jeestlased is also applied to Russian migrant workers in Estonia.

== Accent ==
Their application of Russian pronunciation rules and subsequent mispronunciation of the beginning vowel lettered 'E' in Estonian words into "ye" (as in "yes") in place of the plain 'E' (as in "end") — turning Eesti, eestlane (singular) and eestlased (plural) into Jeesti, jeestlane, and jeestlased (Estonian spelling). This also happened with other words beginning with the vowel 'E', because it looks the same as the Cyrillic letter Е, which is pronounced as "ye" in Russian, while the letter Э is pronounced as a plain "e" (For example, in Russian, the correct word for Estonians is "эстонцы", reflecting the plain "e" of the original).

In the 19th-century Russian Estonians were called Естонцы, whereas in modern Russian the word is эстонцы.

== Party makeup ==
As Mart Laar wrote, the membership of the Communist Party of Estonia (CPE) in the year 1946 was 52% Russians, 27% local Estonians, and 21% "Yestonians". Moscow was distrustful of local communists (most of whom were so-called "June Communists", i.e., who became Communists after the June Coup instigated by the Soviet occupation of Estonia in 1940); and by 1952, the upper ranks of CPE had eventually become occupied by Russians and Yestonians. The reason was the suspicion that the local Communists, being born in independent Estonia, could have some nationalism in them. During the Khrushchev Thaw, the number of ethnic Estonians in the CPE gradually increased, especially in lower ranks, but still in 1966, the CPE Central Committee had only about 27% of local Estonians.

Another demographic distinction between native and "Russian" Estonians was age. In hopes of gaining more autonomy within the Soviet Union, many young Estonians joined CPE around the year 1956, while Yestonians were mostly of older generations.

== See also ==
- Estonianization
- Korenizatsiya
