= Eevi Paasmäe =

Estonian politician (born 1952)

Eevi Paasmäe (born 11 May 1952 in Narva) is an Estonian politician. She was a member of the XIII Riigikogu.
