= Karl Vaino =

Soviet communist politician (1923–2022)

- Карл Вайно
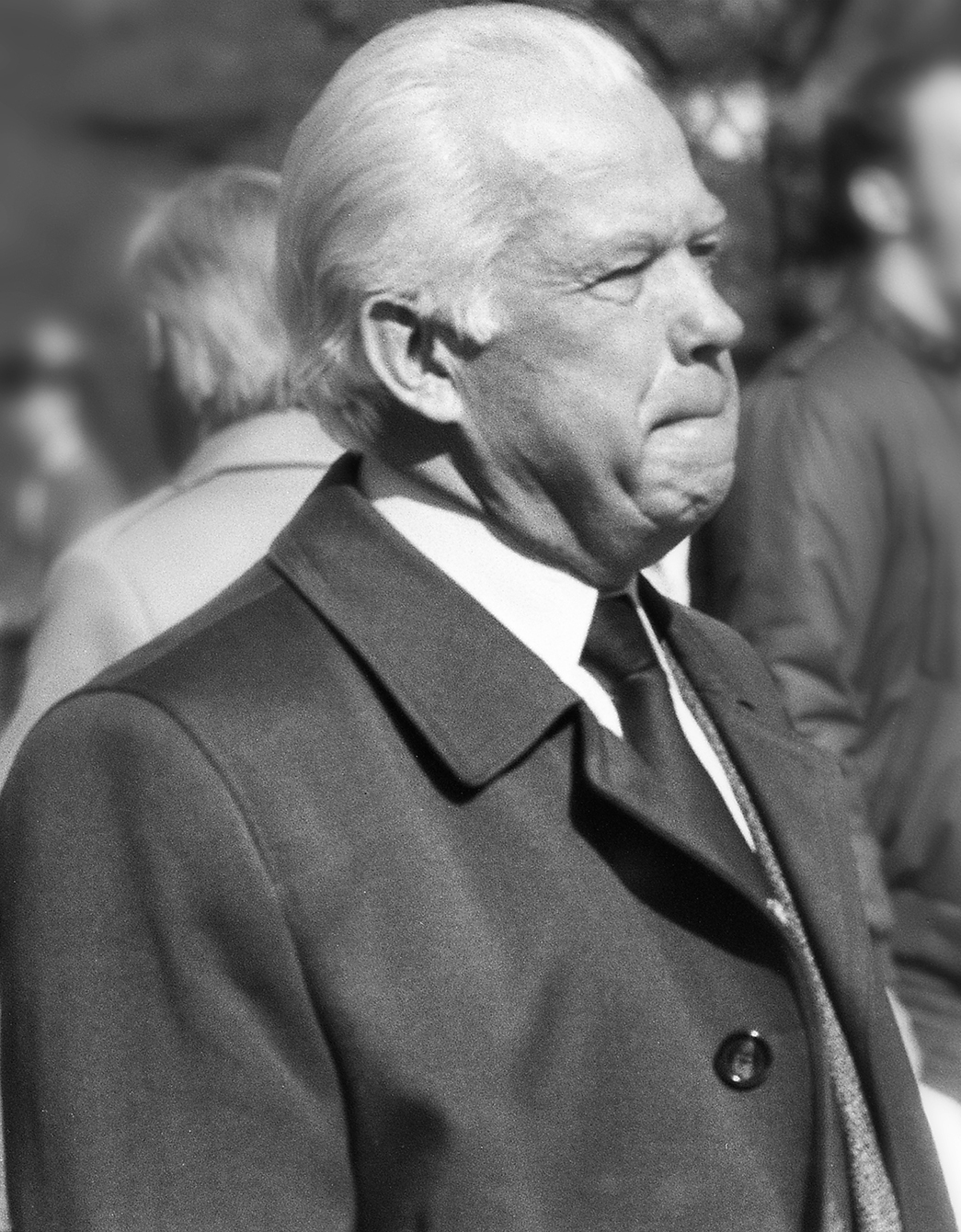
- Vaino in 1987

First Secretary of the Communist Party of Estonia
- In office 26 July 1978 – 16 June 1988
- Preceded by: Johannes Käbin
- Succeeded by: Vaino Väljas

Personal details
- Born: 28 May 1923 Tomsk, Russian SFSR, Soviet Union
- Died: 12 February 2022 (aged 98) Moscow, Russia
- Resting place: Federal Military Memorial Cemetery
- Citizenship: Soviet and Russian
- Party: Communist Party of the Soviet Union (1940–1989)
- Relations: Anton Vaino (grandson)
- Education: Omsk State Transport University

Karl Genrikhovich Vaino (Estonian: Karl Vaino; Russian: Карл Генрихович Вайно; alias Kirill Voinov; 28 May 1923 – 12 February 2022) was a Russian-born Soviet politician in the Estonian Soviet Socialist Republic. He was the First Secretary of the Communist Party of Estonia from 1978 to 1988.

== Early life and career ==
Karl Genrikhovich Vaino was born in 1923 and raised in the city of Tomsk, Siberia, in the Russian Soviet Federative Socialist Republic. His father, Heinrich Vaino (later russified as Genrikh; 1889–1965), was an active Estonian Bolshevik who had moved to Siberia in 1918 after the Bolshevik Russian invasion into Estonia had failed in the 1918–1920 Estonian War of Independence. His mother, Liidia (née Savi), was a daughter of Estonian immigrants who had settled in Siberia at the beginning of the 20th century.

After graduating from what is now the Omsk State Transport University in 1947, Vaino moved to the Estonian Soviet Socialist Republic, and started working in engineering and technical jobs on the railway. He joined the Communist Party of the Soviet Union (CPSU) in 1947. He served as Secretary of the Communist Party's Tallinn Regional Committee from 1948 to 1953. In the 1960s and 1970s, he also served as Secretary of the Central Committee of the Communist Party of the Estonian SSR. He graduated from the Correspondence Higher Party School in 1957.

== Leader of the Estonian SSR ==
Having lived his early life in Russia, Vaino was a native speaker of the Russian language. He was not able to speak Estonian very well, and did so with a thick Russian accent. For this, he was called "Yestonian". On 26 July 1978, the incumbent First Secretary of the past 28 years, Johannes Käbin, who was considered to be too moderate for the ongoing Era of Stagnation Russification, was forced to resign from his post and was replaced by Vaino.

As the First Secretary, Vaino acquired a reputation of being an extreme Russificator. With a dismissive attitude towards Estonian language and culture, he was not popular amongst Estonians. He delivered public speeches mostly in Russian, one notable exception being at the 350th anniversary of Tartu State University, where he presented awards to university workers, speaking in Estonian with a thick Russian accent. In 1979, an unsuccessful attempt was made on his life.

== Downfall ==
In early 1988, the CPE split into national communists and internationalists. Vaino was the leader of the latter, while the former was led by the Soviet ambassador to Nicaragua Vaino Väljas. Being considered too conservative by the Moscow elite, after almost 10 years, Vaino was forced to resign from his post on 16 June 1988, and replaced by Väljas. Vaino then moved to Moscow, where he lived from then onward. He did not visit Estonia again.

== Personal life and death ==
Vaino's daughter, Eleonora Kochetova, is the daughter-in-law of Soviet writer Vsevolod Kochetov, and his son, Eduard, is the Vice President for External Relations at AvtoVAZ. He has two grandsons, Russian politician Anton Vaino and Russian Interior Ministry official Andrey Vaino.

On 19 February 2022, it was announced that Vaino had died on 12 February, at the age of 98. He was buried on 14 February in the Federal Military Memorial Cemetery.

== Awards ==
- Order of Lenin (1981)
- Order of Lenin (1983)
- Order of the October Revolution (1971)
- Order of the Red Banner of Labour (1959)
- Order of the Red Banner of Labour (1965)
- Order of the Red Banner of Labour (1973)
- Medal "For Labour Valour" (1950)

Political offices
Preceded by Johannes Käbin	First Secretary of the Communist Party of Estonia; 1978–1988	Succeeded by Vaino Väljas
