= Urmas Ott =

Estonian journalist

- Born: 23 April 1955; Otepää, Valga County, Estonia
- Died: 17 October 2008 (aged 53); Tartu, Estonia
- Awards

Urmas Ott (April 23, 1955 – October 17, 2008) a/k/a Oti Ummi, was an Estonian television and radio journalist, and talk show host in Soviet Union, Estonia and Russia.

Ott was born in Otepää and first appeared on the Soviet Channel One in 1986 as host of Television Acquaintance (Russian: Телевизионное знакомство) show. He later worked on Russian Channel One and Estonian ETV, hosting "Urmas Ott and Others" on the latter channel.

== Career ==
On television he interviewed well-known people, including Anatoly Karpov, Boris Spassky, Irina Rodnina, Ilya Glazunov, Chuck Norris and Alla Pugacheva. His style was intimate, usually facing the interviewee rather than the audience. He explained humorously that he appealed to Russian viewers because "I'm not one of them and I'm not foreign."

== Personal life ==
He lived in Tallinn and died on 17 October 2008 in Tartu from a heart attack after a bone marrow transplantation undertaken to remedy leukemia.

== Books ==
- Playback (1994)
- Carte Blanche (1995)
- Encore! Neeme Järvi (2001)
- Isikuraamat Erika Salumäest "Surplace" (2002)
- Isikuraamat Vardo Rumessenist "En face" (2002)
- Asmerid. Topeltpeeglis (2007)
