= Pavel Starostin =

Estonian politician (born 1955)

Pavel Starostin (born 25 April 1955) is an Estonian politician. He was a member of X Riigikogu.

== See also ==
- Politics of Estonia
