= Aleksei Müürisepp =

Soviet Estonian politician

Aleksei Müürisepp (17 July 1902, Välta, Kreis Ösel, Governorate of Livonia – 7 October 1970, Tartu) was a Soviet Estonian politician.

1961–1970, he was the chairmen of the Presidium of the Supreme Soviet of the Estonian Soviet Socialist Republic.
