= Jüri Saar (Estonian politician, born 1956) =

Estonian politician (born 1956)

Jüri Saar (born 21 October 1956) is an Estonian politician. He was a member of the XIII Riigikogu.
