= Karl Säre =

Estonian politician

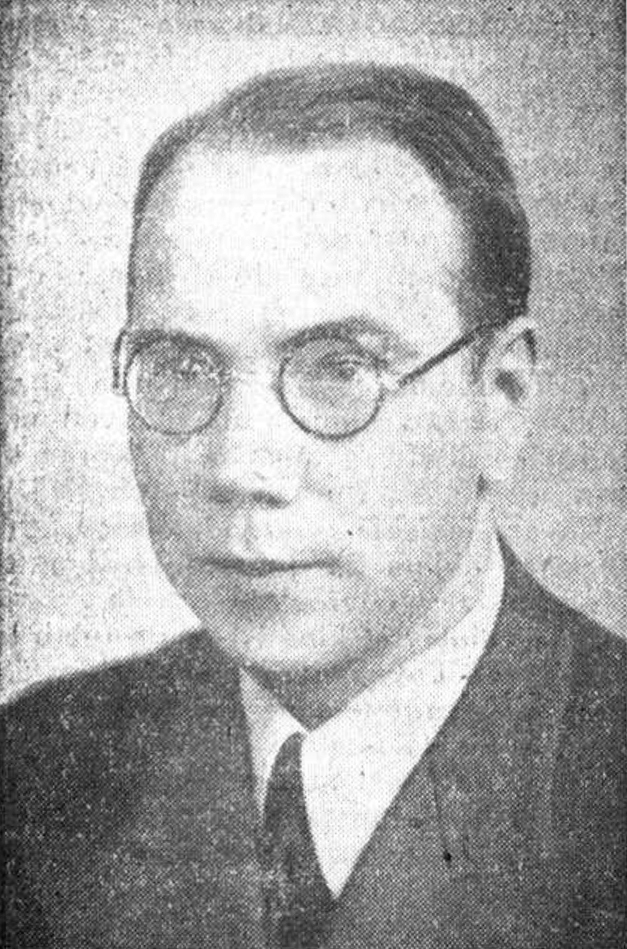
- Säre in 1941

First Secretary of the Communist Party of Estonia
- In office 12 September 1940 – September 1941
- Preceded by: Office established
- Succeeded by: Nikolai Karotamm

Personal details
- Born: 2 July 1903 Derpt, Livonia, Russian Empire
- Died: 14 March 1945 (aged 41) Neuengamme concentration camp, Germany
- Citizenship: Soviet
- Party: All-Union Communist Party (b) (1927–1941)
- Education: Communist University of the National Minorities of the West; International Lenin School

Karl Säre (July 2, 1903 – March 14, 1945) was a Soviet and Estonian communist politician. He was the first First Secretary of the Central Committee of the Estonian Communist Party.

During World War II, Säre was arrested by Nazi Germany and taken to Sachsenhausen concentration camp, where he died in 1945. The Soviet government avoided the mention of Säre's name in any public sources, as he was suspected of treason by disclosing to Nazi Germany information about the Stalinist officials and pro-Soviet agents who had remained in German-occupied Estonia during the war.

== Biography ==
Born in to the family of brewery worker, Säre joined the communist movement at a young age and became a member of the Union of Communist Youth of Estonia in 1917.

In 1921, he left Estonia for Soviet Russia and began his studies at a rabfak and later on the Communist University of the National Minorities of the West.

Säre became a member of the OGPU and later NKVD apparatus and was sent to work in the Soviet embassy in China. He was later sent to conduct underground activities in Estonia and participated in the restoration of the party. He became a member of the Communist Party of Estonia in 1927 and also became formally secretary of the then underground party's youth branch.

He was sent back to Moscow and continued his studies at the International Lenin School and later on was sent to conduct illegal activities in countries like Britain, United States, Denmark and Sweden as a Comintern agent.

In 1938, Säre returned to Estonia and remained there clandestinely. After the Soviet invasion and occupation of Estonia in June 1940, he was actively involved in the newly installed Stalinist puppet government. A few weeks after the annexation of Estonia into the USSR, Säre became member of the Bureau of the Central Committee of the Communist Party of Estonia on 12 September 1940 and was elected its first secretary, thus formally becoming the leader of the Estonian branch of the Communist Party of the USSR.

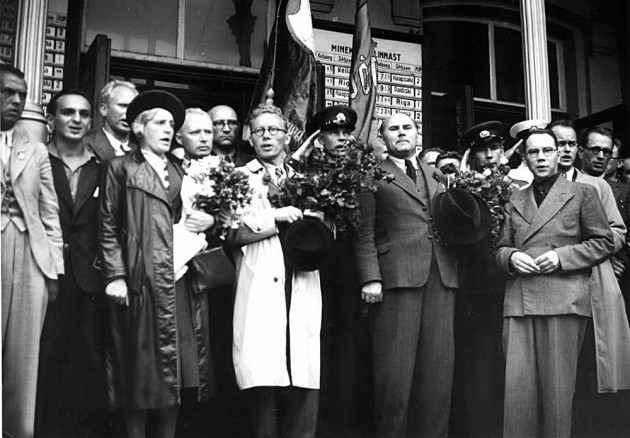
Säre (right, foreground) with other Estonian Communist Party officials in Tallinn, July 1940

In 1941, he became a candidate member of the Central Committee of the All-Union Communist Party (b) and a deputy of the Supreme Soviet. After the German invasion, from, July to August 1941, he was Chairman of the Defense Committee of the Estonian SSR. He was lse underground to organize armed resistance to the Nazi occupiers.

He was arrested by the German occupiers and after extensive investigation he gave the information of his fellow underground communist officials and resistance fighters.

After the Soviet military intelligence network led by Richard Sorge was exposed and detained in Japan in 1942, German intelligence sent a special plane to Tallinn and took Säre from Tallinn's central prison to Berlin. From there he was sent to the Sachsenhausen concentration camp. Karl Säre was probably last seen in the public in Denmark in March 1943, where he had been accused of murdering fellow communist Paul Eltermann.

Further information of Säre is still a subject of investigation. According to the researchers of the Estonian Institute of Historical Memory he was sent to Neuengamme concentration camp, where on 14 March 1945 he died as a result of heart failure.

== Bibliography ==
- Olaf Kuuli, Karl Säre ja 1940. aasta Eestis. Poliitika (1990) nr 3, lk. 51–64.
- Voldemar Pinn. Kes oli Nikolai Karotamm? 1, Kultuuritragöödia jälgedes: kompartei kolmest esimesest sekretärist Karl Särest, Nikolai Karotammest, Johannes Käbinist, Haapsalu: V. Pinn, 1996.
- Laar, Mart. Säre, Karl. Eesti ajalugu elulugudes. 101 tähtsat eestlast. / (Allan Liim, Ago Pajur, Sulev Vahtre... jt); koostanud Sulev Vahtre. Tallinn : Olion, 1997
- Mai Vöörman, Pool sajandit võõra nime all, Luup (1997) nr. 19 (50), September 15.
- Külli Niidassoo, Valdur Ohmann. Eestimaa Kommunistlik Partei – 1930. aastad kuni juuli 1940: varjusurmast ajalooareenile. Tuna (2000) nr 3, lk 68–75.
- Erik Nørgaard. Kongelundeni mõrv: dokumentatsioon, mis sisaldab seni salajas hoitud materjale Kongelundenis vastlapäeval 1936 aset leidnud poliitilise mõrva kohta ja lugu sellest, kuidas kommunistid 1940. aastal Eestis võimu haarasid, Tallinn: 2001, tõlkinud Arvo Alas.
- Valdur Ohmann, EKP Keskkomitee I sekretäri Karl Säre arreteerimisest, reetlikkusest ja tema saatusest Tuna, (2001) nr 4, lk 38–47.
- Helme, Rein. Karl Säre ja kambajõmmid mõrvatööl // Eesti Ekspress, January 30, 2002
- Olev Remsu, "Elitaarne mees Harry Männil", Tln, Tänapäev, 2011

Preceded by New office	First Secretary of the Communist Party of Estonia; 1940–1943	Succeeded by Nikolai Karotamm
