= Johannes Käbin =

Estonian politician

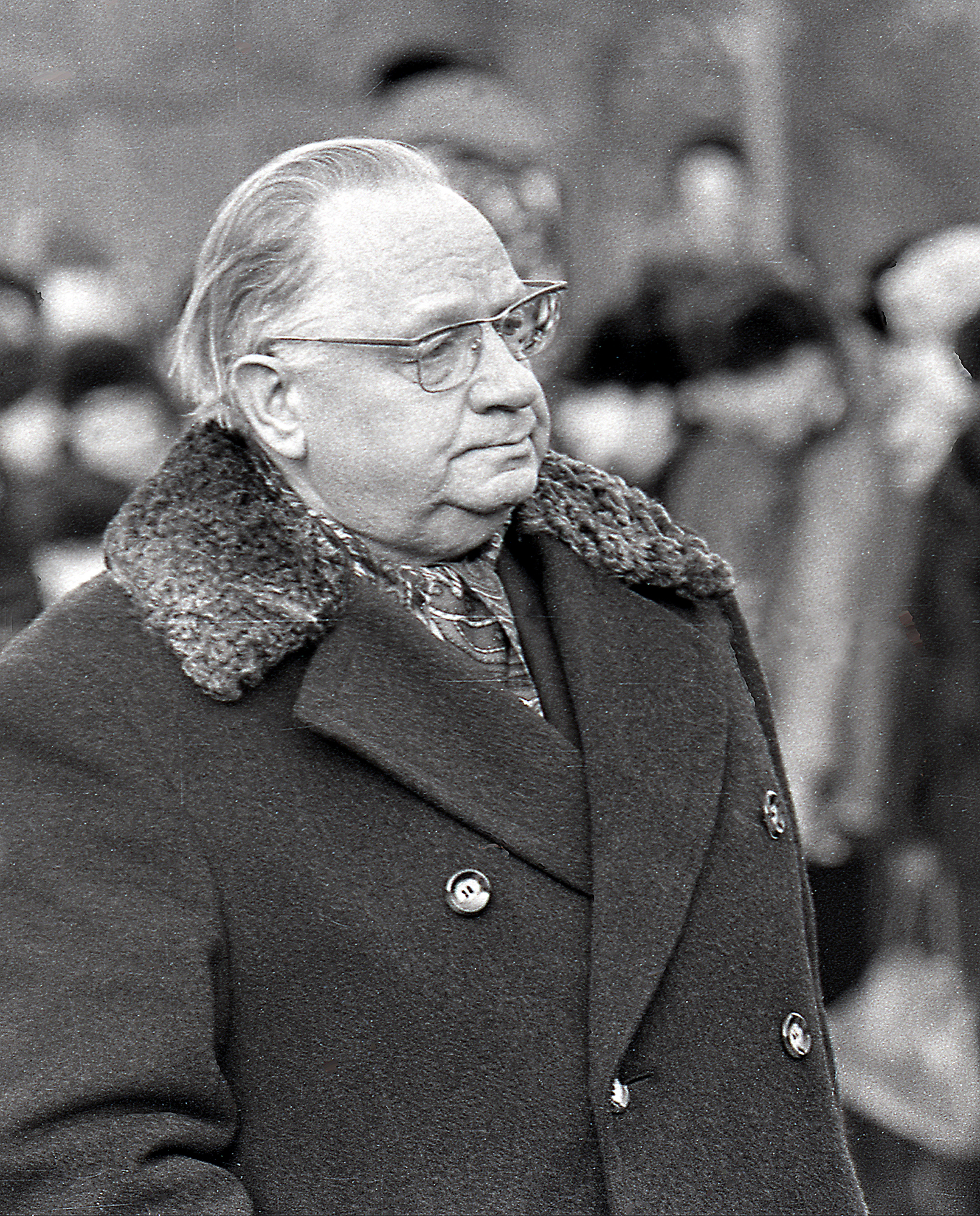
- Käbin in 1978

First Secretary of the Central Committee of Communist Party of Estonia
- In office 26 March 1950 – 26 July 1978
- Preceded by: Nikolai Karotamm
- Succeeded by: Karl Vaino

Personal details
- Born: 24 September 1905 Kalvi, Virumaa, Estonia
- Died: 25 October 1999 (aged 94) Tallinn, Harju, Estonia
- Party: Communist Party of the Soviet Union

Johannes Käbin (also known by his Russified name Ivan Gustavovich Kebin 24 September 1905 – 25 October 1999), was an Estonian Soviet politician who led the Communist Party of Estonia from 1950 to 1978. Käbin was an ethnic Estonian but had been raised in Russia (so-called "Yestonian"), as his family had moved to Saint Petersburg in 1910.

== Early life and education ==
Johannes Käbin was born in 1905 in Kalvi, Virumaa. In 1907, Käbin's family moved from Estonia to Saint Petersburg, where his father died in the same year. In 1916, together with his mother and older sister, he moved to the village of Sussanino in Petrograd Province, where the family bought a small farm (0.27 hectares). In 1926, he entered the Leningrad School of Soviet and Party Construction. A year later, Käbin was appointed chairman of the Susanin Village Council of the Gatchina (Trotsky) district. He completed his studies from the Institute of Red Professors in 1938.

== Career ==
He worked as a teacher in Moscow before returning to Estonia after the Second World War. Käbin later became the Deputy Head of the Propaganda and Agitation Department of the Central Committee of the EKP. In 1948, Käbin returned to be elected secretary of the Central Committee for Propaganda and Agitation. In 1950, at the 8th Plenum, he was elected as First Secretary of the EKP. Though he started as a hardline Stalinist, he gradually became more moderate and pragmatic, always trying to balance Moscow’s demands with the needs of the Estonian people. He was in this position for more than 25 years, in part due the Kremlin's approval of his policies. He was the Chairman of the Supreme Soviet (head of state) from 1978 to 1983.

Many Estonians saw Käbin as a leader who truly cared about the land and the people. He was known for his deep connection to agriculture, often visiting farms and talking directly with farmers, workers and local communities, which contributed to his image as someone attentive to the Estonian countryside and the wider population.

== Later life ==
After the restoration of independence, he remained in Estonia. He died in Tallinn in 1999 at the age of 94. He is buried in Metsakalmistu.

In 2020, Johannes Käbin's autobiography was published, titled "Through Years and Distances."

== Personal life ==
His son is the physicist Eduard Käbin (born 17 April 1945), who is a graduate of Moscow State University and is an Honorary Worker of Higher Professional Education of Russia.

== Awards ==
He received many awards, such as the:

- Hero of Socialist Labour (1975)
- Six Orders of Lenin (1950, 1955, 1958, 1965, 1971, 1975)
- Order of the October Revolution (1973)
- Two Orders of the Red Banner of Labour (1946, 1981)
- Order of Friendship of Peoples (1985)
- Medal "For Labour Valour" (1959)

Political offices
Preceded by Nikolai Karotamm	First Secretary of the Communist Party of Estonia; 1950–1978	Succeeded by Karl Vaino
Preceded by Meta Vannas	Chairman of the Presidium of the Supreme Soviet of the Estonian SSR; 1978–1983	Succeeded by Arnold Rüütel
