= Estonian Soviet Socialist Republic =

Soviet republic from 1940 to 1991

Estonian Soviet Socialist Republic: Eesti Nõukogude Sotsialistlik Vabariik (Estonian); Эстонская Советская Социалистическая Республика (Russian)
- 1940–1941, 1944–1990
- Flag (1953–1990) State emblem (1940–1990)
- Motto: Kõigi maade proletaarlased, ühinege! (Estonian)}} "Workers of the world, unite!"}}
- Anthem: "Anthem of the Estonian Soviet Socialist Republic"
- Location of annexed Estonia (red) within the USSR (as of 1956–1991)
- Status: Internationally unrecognized territory occupied by the Soviet Union (1940–1941, 1944–1990)
- Capital: Tallinn; 59°26′09″N 24°44′15″E
- Common languages: Estonian; Russian
- Religion: Secular state (de jure); State atheism (de facto)
- Demonym: Estonian
- Government: Unitary communist state (1940–1988); Unitary parliamentary republic (1988–1990)
- First Secretary
  - 1940–1941: Karl Säre
  - 1944–1950: Nikolai Karotamm
  - 1950–1978: Johannes Käbin
  - 1978–1988: Karl Vaino
  - 1988–1990: Vaino Väljas
- Head of state
  - 1940–1946 (first): Johannes Vares
  - 1983–1990 (last): Arnold Rüütel
- Head of government
  - 1940–1941 (first): Johannes Lauristin
  - 1988–1990 (last): Indrek Toome
- Legislature: Supreme Soviet
- Historical era: World War II · Cold War
  - Soviet invasion: 17 June 1940
  - Declared Soviet Republic: 21 July 1940
  - Annexed into the Soviet Union: 6 August 1940
  - German occupation: 1941–1944
  - Second Soviet occupation: 1944–1991
  - Beginning of the Singing Revolution: 14 June 1987
  - Sovereignty declared: 16 November 1988
  - End of the use of the state name Estonian SSR: 8 May 1990
  - Restoration of independence: 20 August 1991
  - Withdrawal of Russian Army from Estonia: 31 August 1994

Area
- 1989: 45,227 km^{2} (17,462 sq mi)

Population
  - 1989: 1,565,662
- Currency: Soviet ruble (SUR)
- Calling code: +7 014
Preceded by	Succeeded by
Republic of Estonia (1940); Reichskommissariat Ostland (1944)	Continuity and restoration of the Republic of Estonia (1991)
- Today part of: Estonia

The Estonian Soviet Socialist Republic (Note: Estonian: Eesti Nõukogude Sotsialistlik Vabariik, Russian: Эстонская Советская Социалистическая Республика, romanized: Estonskaya Sovetskaya Sotsialisticheskaya Respublika) (Estonian SSR, ESSR), also known as Soviet Estonia, was a de facto administrative unit (union republic) of the former Soviet Union, established on the occupied and annexed territory of Estonia in 1940. It existed from 1940 to 1941 and again from 1944 until 1990, when the use of the name Estonian SSR was discontinued.

It was nominally established to replace the until then independent Republic of Estonia on 21 July 1940, a month after the 16–17 June 1940 Soviet military invasion and occupation of the country during World War II. After the installation of a Stalinist government which, backed by the occupying Soviet Red Army, declared Estonia a Soviet constituency, the Estonian SSR was subsequently incorporated into the Soviet Union as a union republic on 6 August 1940. Estonia was occupied by Nazi Germany in 1941, until it was reconquered by the USSR in 1944.

Most of the world's countries did not recognise the incorporation of Estonia into the Soviet Union de jure and only recognised its Soviet administration de facto or not at all. A number of countries continued to recognise Estonian diplomats and consuls who still functioned in the name of their former government. This policy of non-recognition gave rise to the principle of legal continuity, which held that de jure, Estonia remained an independent state under occupation throughout the 1940–1991 period.

On 16 November 1988, Estonia became the first of the then Soviet-controlled countries to declare state sovereignty from the central government in Moscow. On 30 March 1990, the newly elected parliament declared that Estonia had been illegally occupied since 1940 and proclaimed a transitional period for the restoration of the country's full independence through Restitutio ad integrum. Subsequently, on 8 May 1990, the Supreme Soviet ended the use of the Soviet symbols as state symbols together with the name Estonian Soviet Socialist Republic and adopted Republic of Estonia as the official name of the state. Estonia was taking over and restored state institutions – on 1 August 1990, Estonia took over Soviet Ministry of Interior assets in Estonia; on 1 January 1990 Bank of Estonia was re-established; on 1 November 1990, the Estonian Border Guard; on 12 February 1991, Estonian Internal Security Service, on 1 March 1991 Estonian Police, and so on, eroding the occupation authorities in the state.

During the 1991 Soviet coup attempt the parliament of Estonia declared the re-establishment of full independence on 20 August 1991. The Soviet Union formally recognised the independence of Estonia on 6 September 1991. On 31 August 1994, the last remaining Russian troops left Estonia, ending the era.

== History ==
=== Second World War ===
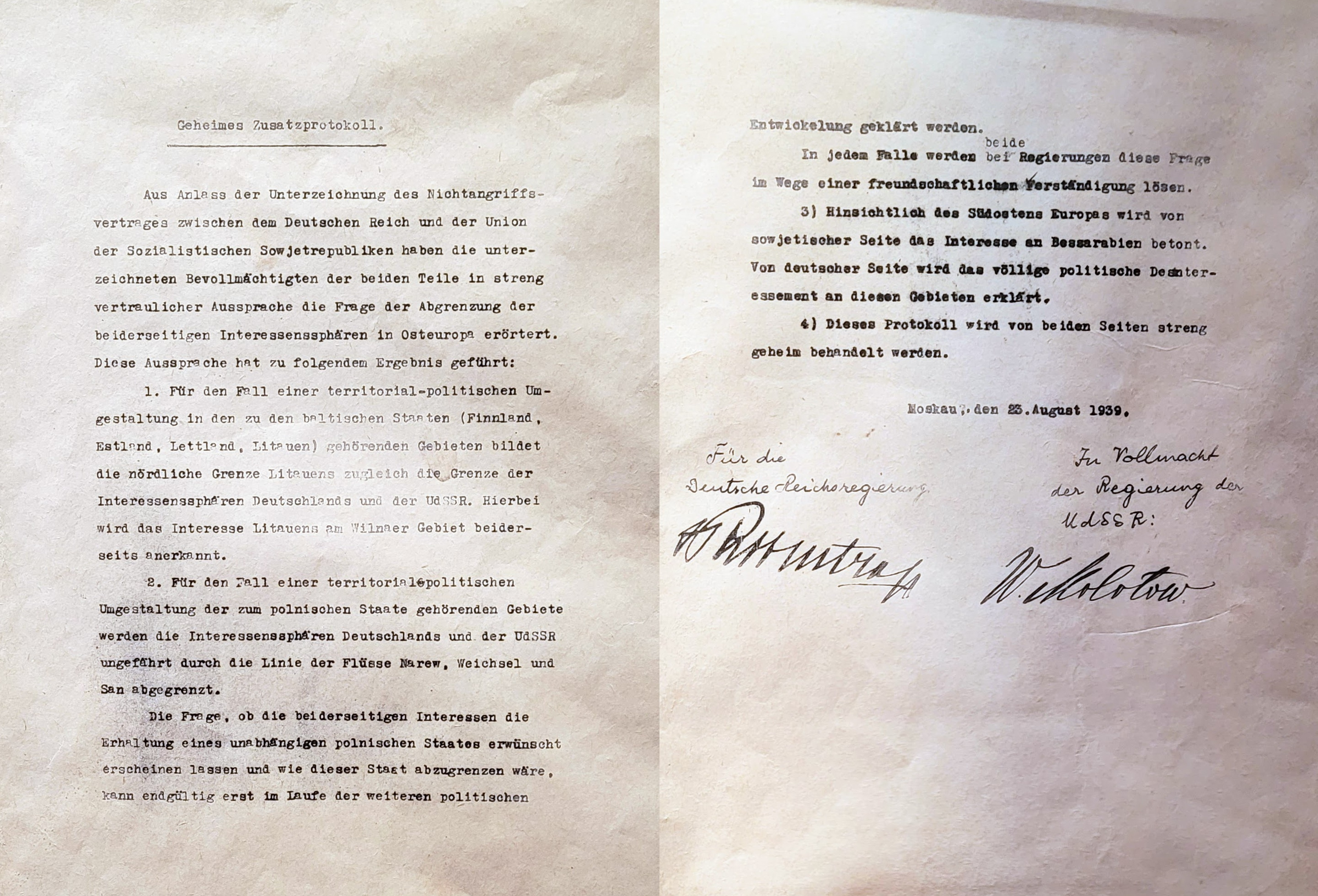
According to the 23 August 1939 Nazi-Soviet Pact Finland, Estonia, Latvia, Lithuania were divided into German and Soviet "spheres of influence" (German copy)

Flag of the Estonian SSR (1940–1953)

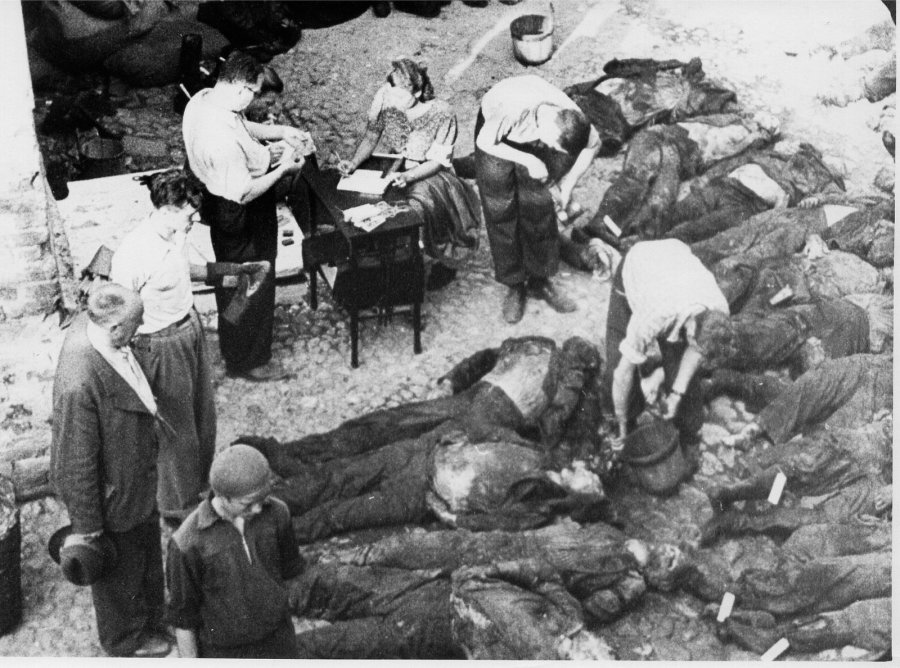
People massacred by the Soviet NKVD on 8 July 1941 in Tartu, Estonia

The Nazi-Soviet Pact which was signed on 23 August 1939, a week before the outbreak of World War II, secretly assigned Estonia to the Soviet "sphere of influence". On 24 September 1939, warships of the Soviet Navy blocked the major ports of Estonia, a neutral country, and Soviet bombers began patrolling over and around its capital city Tallinn. Moscow demanded that Estonia allow the USSR to establish Soviet military bases on its territory and station 25,000 troops in these bases "for the duration of the European war". The government of Estonia yielded to the ultimatum, signing the corresponding mutual assistance agreement on 28 September 1939.

=== Soviet occupation of Estonia ===
On 12 June 1940, the order for total military blockade of Estonia was given to the Soviet Baltic fleet. On 14 June, the Soviet military blockade of Estonia went into effect while the world's attention was focused on the fall of Paris to Nazi Germany. Two Soviet bombers shot down a Finnish passenger aircraft "Kaleva" flying from Tallinn to Helsinki carrying three diplomatic pouches from the U.S. legations in Tallinn, Riga and Helsinki. On 16 June, Soviet NKVD troops raided border posts in Estonia (along with Lithuania and Latvia). Soviet leader Joseph Stalin claimed that the 1939 mutual assistance treaties had been violated, and gave six-hour ultimatums for new governments to be formed in each country, including lists of persons for cabinet posts provided by the Kremlin. The Soviet ultimatum to Estonia was issued on 16 June 1940. The Estonian government decided, in accordance with the Kellogg–Briand Pact, to not respond to the ultimatums by military means. Given the overwhelming Soviet force both on the borders and inside the country, the order was given not to resist to avoid bloodshed and open war.

On 16–17 June 1940, the Red Army emerged from its military bases in Estonia and, aided by an additional 90,000 Soviet troops, took over the country, occupying the entire territory of the Republic of Estonia. Most of the Estonian Defence Forces and the Estonian Defence League surrendered according to the orders, and were disarmed by the Red Army. Only the Estonian Independent Signal Battalion stationed at Raua Street in Tallinn began armed resistance. As the Soviet troops brought in additional reinforcements supported by six armoured fighting vehicles, the battle at Raua Street lasted for several hours until sundown. There was one dead, several wounded on the Estonian side and about 10 killed and more wounded on the Soviet side. Finally the military resistance was ended with negotiations and the Independent Signal Battalion surrendered and was disarmed.

By 18 June 1940, large-scale military operations for the occupation of Estonia, Latvia and Lithuania were complete. In the following days, the Soviet troops organised and supported Stalinist "demonstrations" in Tallinn and other larger cities. Thereafter, state administrations were liquidated and replaced by Soviet cadres, followed by mass repression. Time magazine reported on 24 June, that "Half a million men and countless tanks" of the Red Army "moved to safeguard [Russia's] frontier against conquest-drunk Germany," one week before the Fall of France. On 21 June 1940, the Soviet military occupation of the Republic of Estonia was complete. That day, the President Konstantin Päts (deported to Ufa, Russian SFSR on 30 July 1940 and arrested a few weeks later) was pressured into affirming the Andrei Zhdanov-appointed puppet government of Johannes Vares, following the arrival of demonstrators accompanied by Red Army troops with armoured vehicles to the residence of the Estonian president. The flag of Estonia was replaced with a Red flag on Tallinn's Pikk Hermann tower.

On 14–15 July 1940, rigged extraordinary parliamentary elections were held by the occupation authorities, in which voters were presented with a single list of pro-Stalinist candidates. To maximise voter turnout to legitimise the new system, the voters' documents were stamped in voting facilities for future identification of voting, along with a threat running in the main Communist newspaper, Rahva Hääl, that "It would be extremely unwise to shirk elections. ... Only people's enemies stay at home on election day." Each ballot carried only the Soviet-assigned candidate's name, with the only way to register opposition being to strike out that name on the ballot. According to official election results, the Communist "Union of the Estonian Working People" bloc won 92.8% of the votes with 84.1% of the population attending the elections. Time magazine reported that, following the elections, tribunals were set up to judge and punish "traitors to the people", which included opponents of Sovietization and those who did not vote for incorporation in the Soviet Union. This election is considered illegal, since the amended electoral law—along with hundreds of other laws passed by the Vares government—had not been approved by the upper house of parliament, as required by the Estonian constitution. The upper house had been dissolved soon after the Soviet occupation and was never reconvened.

Once the elections were concluded, authorities which had previously denied any intention of setting up a Soviet regime began openly speaking of Sovietisation and incorporation into the Soviet Union. The newly "elected" "People's Parliament" met on 21 July 1940. Its sole piece of business was a petition to join the Soviet Union, which passed unanimously. The Estonian SSR was formally annexed into the Soviet Union on 6 August 1940, becoming nominally the 16th constituent part (or "union republic") of the USSR. After another "union republic", the Karelo-Finnish SSR was demoted to an "ASSR", or to an "autonomous union republic" in 1956, until 1991 the Soviet authorities referred to the Estonian SSR as the 15th (i.e., "the last on the list") constituent "republic".

On 23 July 1940, the new Stalinist regime nationalised all land, banks and major industrial enterprises in Estonia. Farmers were allotted small plots of land during the land reforms. Most small businesses were nationalised soon afterwards. The Soviet central government launched the colonisation of the occupied country by promoting a large-scale population movement into Estonia, as immigrants from Russia and other parts of the former USSR settled in Estonia. According to some Western scholars, relations between the Soviet Union and Estonian SSR were those of internal colonialism.

- the earlier economic structures constructed mostly in 1920–1940 were purposefully destroyed;
- new production structures were constructed only to satisfy interests of the colonial power, assigning priorities according to an all-union production chain network;
- local environmental resources were extensively over used;
- the employment and migration policies were tailored towards assimilating the native population;
- former economic ties of Estonia were cut off and Estonian economy was isolated from non-Soviet markets.

All banks and accounts were essentially nationalised; a lot of industrial machinery was disassembled and relocated to other Soviet territories. Before retreating in 1941, the Red Army, following the scorched earth policies, burnt most industrial constructions, destroying power plants, vehicles and cattle. Millions of dollars' worth of goods were allegedly moved from Estonia to Russia during the evacuation of 1941.

There was excess mortality among common people, too, that has been attributed to malnutrition.

==== International reaction ====
Immediately following the June 1940 Estonian occupation by the Soviet Union and incorporation as a result of a Soviet-supported Communist coup d'état, the only foreign powers to recognise the Soviet annexation were Nazi Germany and Sweden.

Shipping was nationalized. Ships were ordered to fly the hammer and sickle and head for a Soviet port. August Torma, the envoy appointed by previous Estonian government, sought protection and reassurance for the 20 Estonian ships in British ports. He failed to obtain reassurance, so the majority went to the Soviet Union.

The Irish experience was different. There was a fight between Peter Kolts, who hoisted the hammer and sickle and Captain Joseph Juriska who wanted to remove it. The Garda Síochána were called. The next day, Justice Michael Lennon sentenced Kolts to a week in jail. Following this verdict and sentence, the ships in Irish ports choose to remain. The Soviet Union unsuccessfully pursued the issue of ownership through the Irish Courts and made a 'most emphatic' protest to the Irish government. There were three Estonian ships in Irish ports, plus two from Latvia and one Lithuanian. This had a significant effect on Ireland's ability to continue trading during the war, due to the small size of its own merchant navy.

The United States, United Kingdom, and several other countries considered the annexation of Estonia by the USSR illegal following the Stimson Doctrine—a stance that made the doctrine an established precedent of international law. Although the US, the UK, the other Allies of World War II recognised the occupation of the Baltic states by USSR at Yalta Conference in 1945 de facto, they retained diplomatic relations with the exiled representatives of the independent Republic of Estonia, and never formally recognised the annexation of Estonia de jure.

The Government of Russia and its officials maintain that the 1940 Soviet annexation of Estonia was legitimate.

1941 Estonian Soviet Socialist Republic internal passport issued 17 days before Operation Barbarossa.

=== Nazi occupation ===
After Nazi Germany invaded the Soviet Union on 22 June 1941, the Wehrmacht reached Estonia in July 1941. The Germans were perceived by many Estonians as liberators from the USSR and Communism in general. Thousands of Estonian men fought directly alongside the German army throughout the war. An anti-communist guerrilla group called the Forest Brothers also assisted the Wehrmacht. Estonia was incorporated into the German province of Ostland.

=== Soviet recapture ===
The Soviet Union retook Estonia in 1944, thereafter occupying it for nearly another half century. This began when the Red Army re-occupied Estonian Ingria, Narva and eastern Vaivara Parish in the Battle of Narva, Southeast Estonia in the Tartu Offensive and the rest of the country in the Baltic Offensive. Faced with the country being re-occupied by the Soviet Army, 80,000 people fled from Estonia by sea to Finland and Sweden in 1944. 25,000 Estonians reached Sweden and a further 42,000 Germany. During the war about 8,000 Estonian Swedes and their family members had emigrated to Sweden. After the retreat of the Germans, about 30,000 partisans remained in hiding in the Estonian forests, waging a guerrilla war until the early 1950s.

After re-occupation, the Soviet nationalization policy of 1940 was reimposed, as well as the collectivization of farms. Over 900,000 hectares were expropriated in the few years following reoccupation, while much of that land was given to new settlers from Russia or other locations in the Soviet Union. Rapid collectivization began in 1946, followed in 1947 by a crackdown against kulak farmers. The kulak repression started as oppressive taxation, but eventually led to mass deportations. Those who resisted collectivization were killed or deported. More than 95% of farms were collectivised by 1951.

The 1949 mass deportation of about 21,000 people broke the back of the partisan movement. 6,600 partisans gave themselves up in November 1949. Later on, the failure of the Hungarian uprising broke the morale of 700 men still remaining under cover. According to Soviet data, up until 1953 20,351 partisans were defeated. Of these, 1,510 perished in the battles. During that period, 1,728 members of the Red Army, NKVD and the Estonian Police were killed by the "forest brothers". August Sabbe, the last surviving "brother" in Estonia, committed suicide when the KGB tracked him down and attempted to arrest him in 1978. He drowned in a lake, when the KGB agent, disguised as a fisherman, was after him.

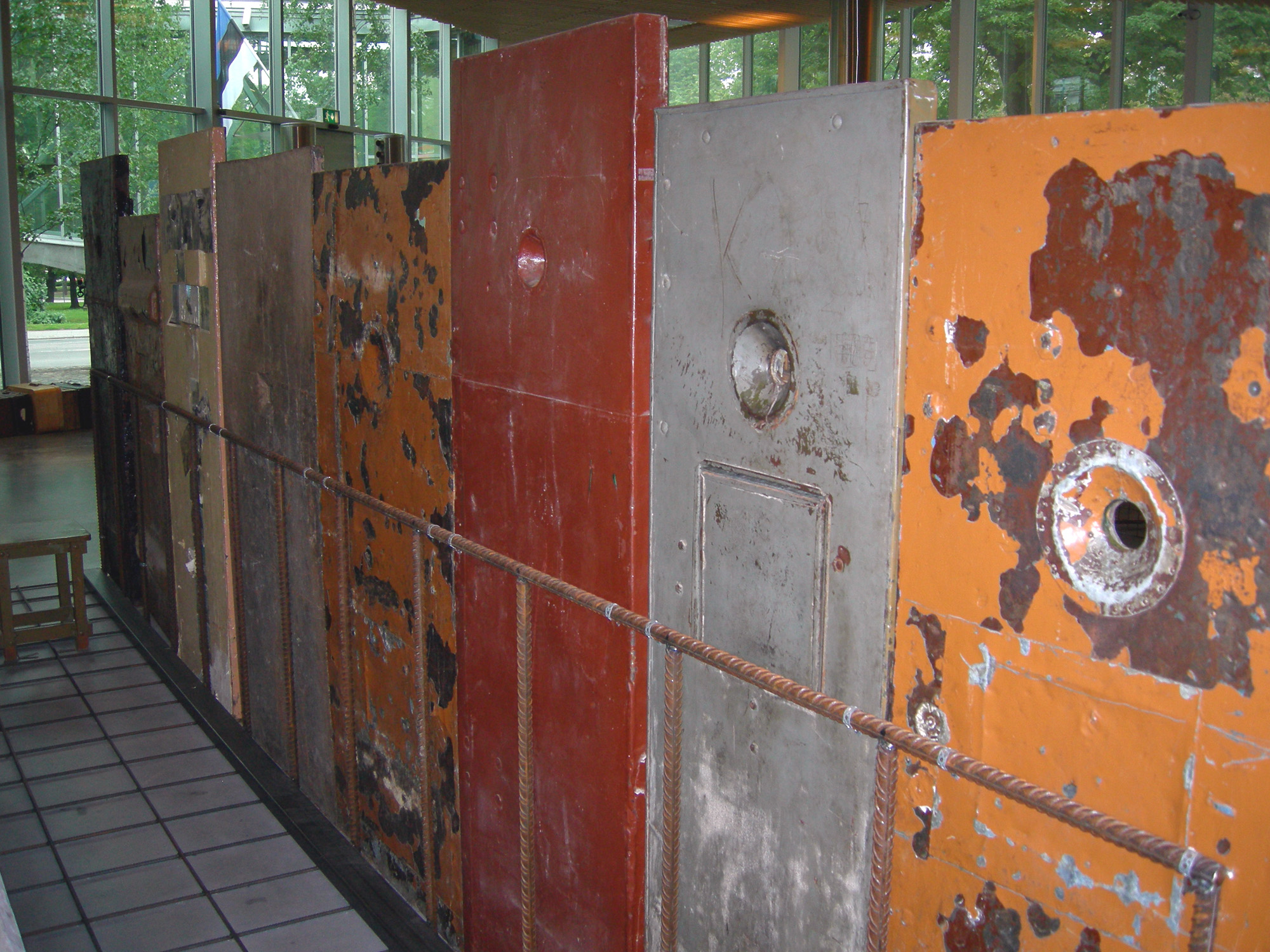
Soviet prison doors on display in the Museum of Occupations, Tallinn, Estonia

During the first post-war decade of Soviet rule, Estonia was governed by Moscow via Russian-born ethnic Estonian functionaries. Born into the families of native Estonians in Russia, the latter had obtained their education in the Soviet Union during the Stalin era. Many of them had fought in the Red Army (in the Estonian Rifle Corps), few of them had mastered the Estonian language. For the latter reason they were known under a derogatory term "Yestonians", alluding to their Russian accent.

Although the United States and the United Kingdom, the major allies of the USSR against Nazi Germany during the later stages of World War II, both implicitly acknowledged (de facto) the occupation of Estonia by USSR at the Yalta Conference in 1945, both governments, and most of the other western democracies did not recognise it de jure according to the Sumner Welles' declaration of 23 July 1940. Some of these countries recognised Estonian diplomats who still functioned in many countries in the name of their former governments. These consuls persisted in this anomalous situation until the ultimate restoration of Estonia's independence in 1991.

Special care was taken to change the ethnic structure of population, especially in Ida-Viru County. For example, a policy of prioritising immigrants before returning war refugees in assigning dwelling quarters was adopted.

==== Destruction of graveyards and war memorials ====
Estonian graveyards and monuments from the period of 1918–1944 were dismantled. Among others, in the Tallinn Military Cemetery the majority of gravestones from 1918 to 1944 were destroyed by the Soviet authorities. This graveyard was then re-used by the Red Army after World War II.

Other cemeteries destroyed by the authorities during the Soviet era in Estonia include Baltic German cemeteries, Kopli cemetery (established in 1774), Mõigu cemetery and the oldest cemetery in Tallinn, the Kalamaja cemetery (from the 16th century). After the re-occupation of Estonia in 1944, the dismantling of monuments from the Republic of Estonia, which had survived or had been restored during the German occupation, continued. On 15 April 1945, in Pärnu, a monument by Amandus Adamson, erected to 87 persons who had fallen in the Estonian War of Independence, was demolished. The dismantling of war memorials continued for several years and occurred across all districts of the country. A comprehensive file concerning the monuments of the Estonian War of Independence, compiled by the Military Department of the EC(b)P Central Committee in April 1945, has been preserved in the Estonian State Archives. Monuments are listed by counties in this file and it specifies the amount of explosive and an evaluation concerning the transportation that were needed. An extract regarding Võrumaa reads:

"In order to carry out demolition works, 15 Party activists and 275 persons from the Destruction Battalion must be mobilised. 15 workers are needed for the execution of each demolition and 10 people are needed for protection.... In order to carry out demolition works, 225 kg of TNT, 150 metres of rope/fuse and 100 primers are needed, since there is no demolition material on the spot. 11 lorries, which are available but which lack petrol, are needed for carrying the ruins away."

=== Post-Stalin regime ===
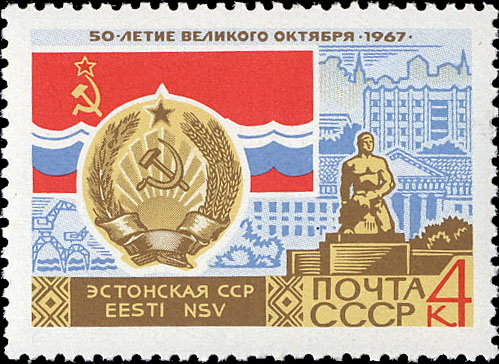
1967 Soviet stamp

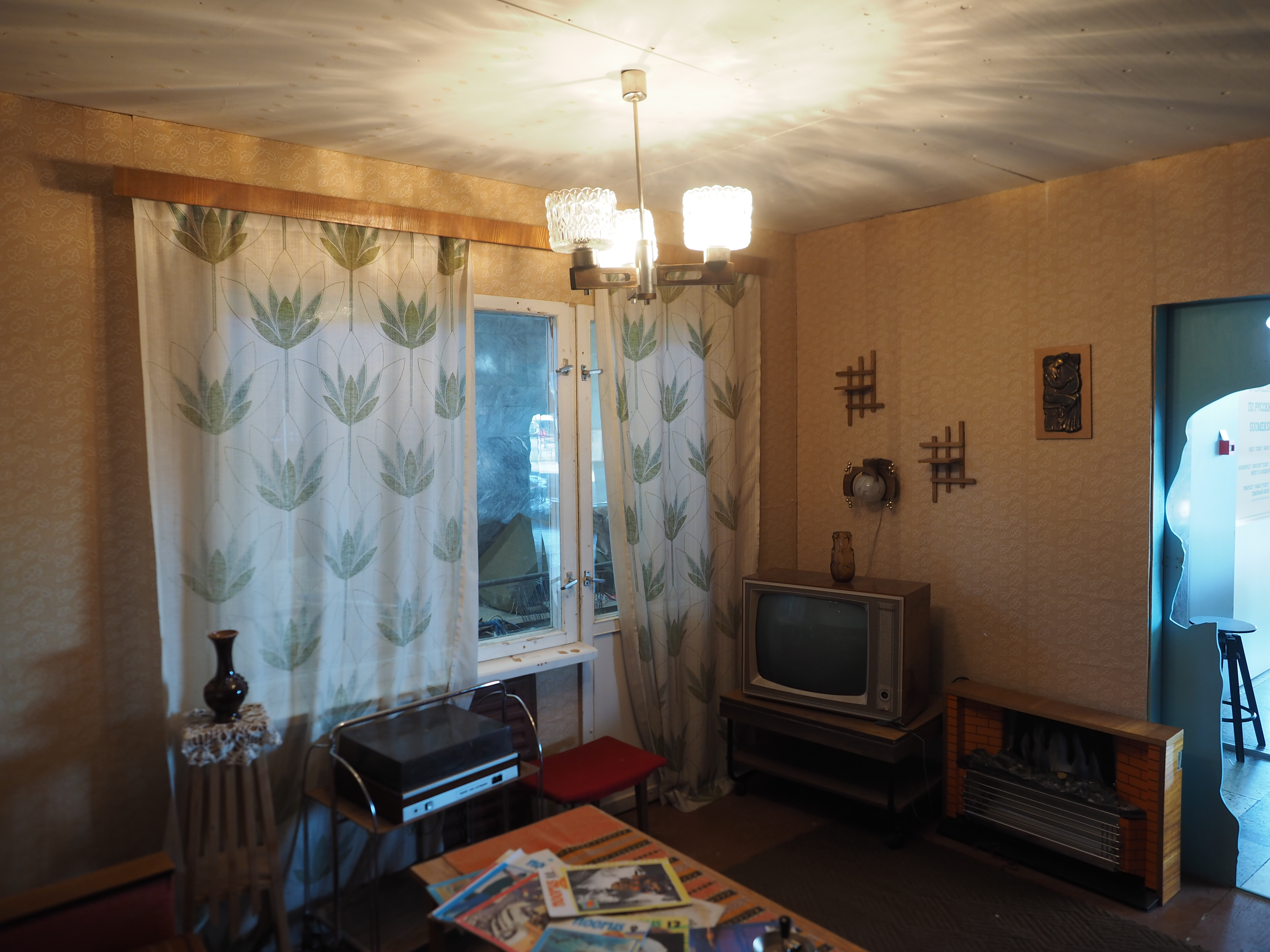
A reconstruction of a typical Soviet-era living room, in a museum in central Tallinn.

After Stalin's death, the Party membership vastly expanded its social base to include more ethnic Estonians. By the mid-1960s, the percentage of ethnic Estonian membership stabilised near 50%. One positive aspect of the post-Stalin era in Estonia was the regranting of permission in the late 1950s for citizens to make contact with foreign countries. Ties were reactivated with Finland, and in 1965, a ferry service was opened between Tallinn and Helsinki. President of Finland Urho Kekkonen had visited Tallinn in the previous year and the ferry line is widely credited to Kekkonen.

Some Estonians began watching Finnish television as the Helsinki television tower broadcast from just 80 kilometres (50 mi) and the signal was strong enough in Tallinn and elsewhere on the north Estonian coast. This electronic "window on the West" afforded Estonians more information on current affairs and more access to Western culture and thought than any other group in the Soviet Union. This somewhat more open media environment was important in preparing Estonians for their vanguard role in extending perestroika during the Gorbachev era.

In the late 1970s, Estonian society grew increasingly concerned about the threat of cultural Russification to the Estonian language and national identity. In 1980, Tallinn hosted the sailing events of the 1980 Summer Olympics. By 1981, Russian was taught already in the second grade of Estonian-language primary schools and in some urban areas was also being introduced into Estonian pre-school teaching.

Soviet authorities began to lure in Finnish tourists and the much needed foreign exchange they could bring. The Soviet travel agency Inturist contracted Finnish construction company Repo to build Hotel Viru in central Tallinn. Estonians saw very different construction equipment, methods and work morale. An improved ferry MS Georg Ots between Tallinn and Helsinki came into operation. Estonia gained Western currency, but on the other hand Western thoughts and customs began to infiltrate Soviet Estonia.

=== Perestroika ===
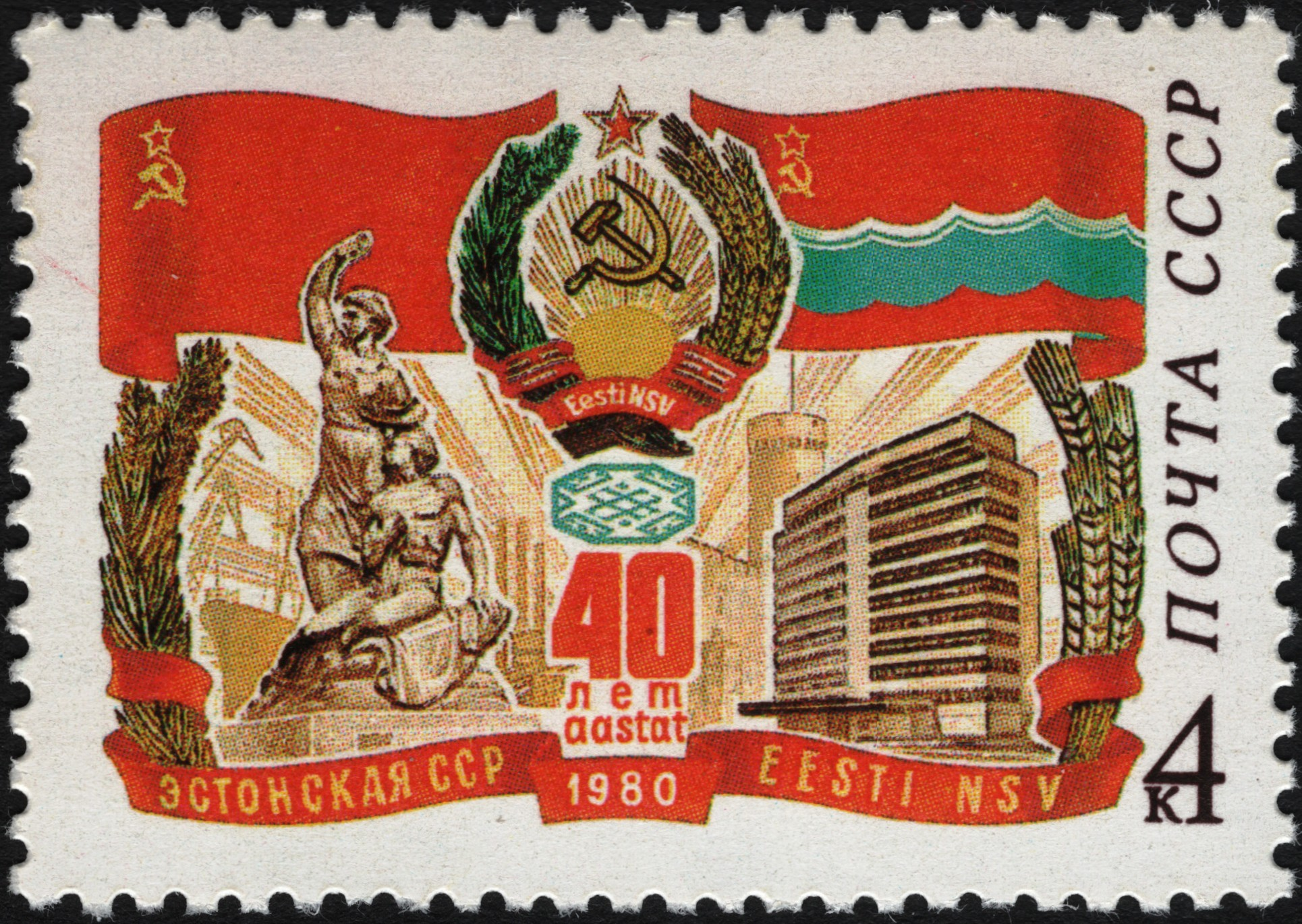
40th anniversary of the Estonian SSR, Soviet stamp

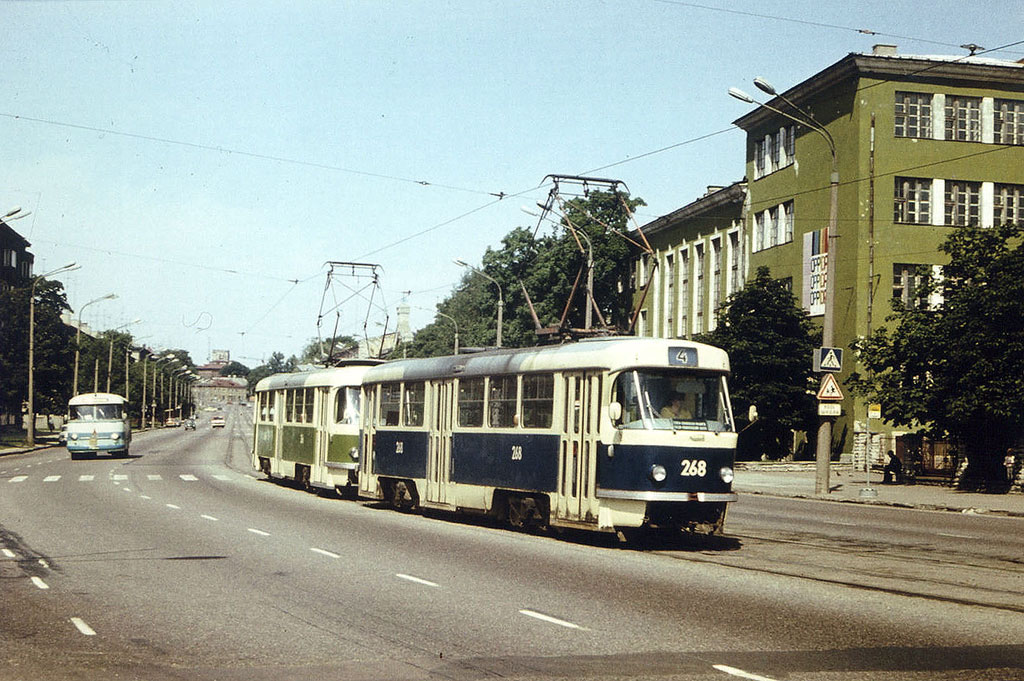
A Tatra T4 tram along the Pärnu maantee street in Tallinn on 26 June 1983

By the beginning of the Gorbachev era, concern over the cultural survival of the Estonian people had reached a critical point. The ECP remained stable in the early perestroika years but waned in the late 1980s. Other political movements, groupings and parties moved to fill the power vacuum. The first and most important was the Estonian Popular Front, established in April 1988 with its own platform, leadership and broad constituency. The Greens and the dissident-led Estonian National Independence Party soon followed. By 1989 the political spectrum had widened, and new parties were formed and re-formed almost every week.

Estonia's "Supreme Soviet" transformed from a powerless rubber stamp institution into an authentic regional lawmaking body. This relatively conservative legislature passed an early declaration of sovereignty (16 November 1988); a law on economic independence (May 1989) confirmed by the USSR Supreme Soviet that November; a language law making Estonian the official language (January 1989); and local and republic election laws stipulating residency requirements for voting and candidacy (August, November 1989).

Although the majority of Estonia's numerous Soviet-era immigrants did not support full independence, the mostly ethnic Russian immigrant community was divided in terms of opinions on the "sovereign republic". In March 1990, some 18% of Russian-speakers supported the idea of a fully independent Estonia, up from 7% the previous autumn. By early 1990 only a small minority of ethnic Estonians were opposed to full independence.

==== Restoration of independence ====
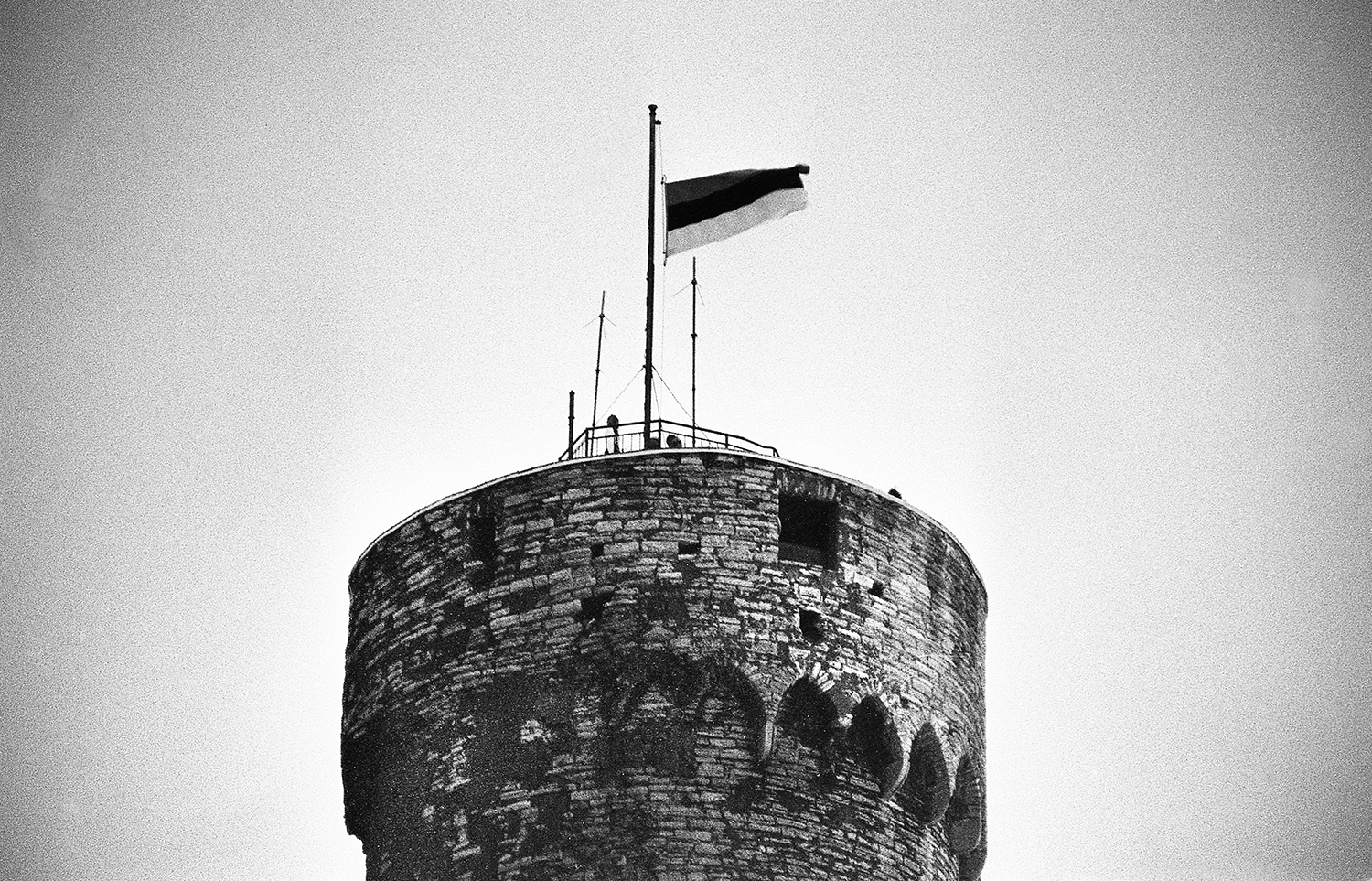
The blue-black-white flag of Estonia was raised on Pikk Hermann on 24 February 1989.

On 16 November 1988, the first freely elected parliament during the Soviet era in Estonia had passed the Estonian Sovereignty Declaration. On 8 May 1990, the Parliament reinstated the 1938 constitution, and the Estonian Soviet Socialist Republic was renamed the Republic of Estonia. On 20 August 1991, the Estonian Parliament adopted a resolution confirming its independence from the Soviet Union. First to recognise Estonia as an independent country was Iceland, on 22 August 1991. On 6 September 1991, the State Council of the USSR recognised the independence of Estonia, immediately followed by recognitions from other countries.

On 23 February 1989, the flag of the Estonian SSR was lowered on Pikk Hermann, and replaced with the blue-black-white flag of Estonia on 24 February 1989. In 1992, Heinrich Mark, the Prime Minister of the Republic of Estonia in Exile, presented his credentials to the newly elected President of Estonia Lennart Meri. The last Russian troops withdrew from Estonia in August 1994. Russia officially ended its military presence in Estonia after it relinquished control of the nuclear reactor facilities in Paldiski in September 1995; Estonia joined the European Union and NATO in 2004.

== Geography ==
=== Territorial changes ===
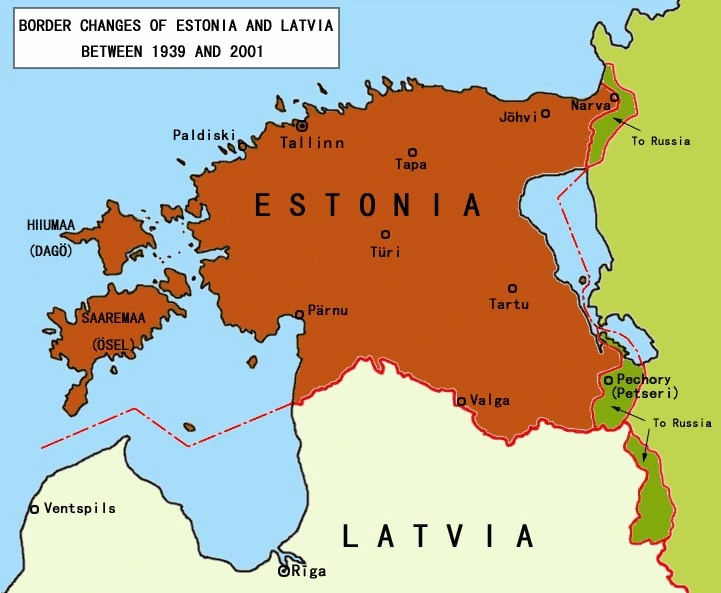
Border changes of Estonia after World War II

In the aftermath of the Estonian War of Independence, Estonia established control also over Ivangorod, in January 1919, a move which was recognised by Soviet Russia in the 1920 Treaty of Tartu. In January 1945, the Narva River was defined as the border between the Estonian SSR and Russian SFSR, and as a result administration of Ivangorod was transferred from Narva to the Leningrad Oblast which having grown in population received the official status of town in 1954.

In 1945 the Petseri County was annexed and ceded to the Russian SFSR where it became one of the districts of Pskov Oblast. After the collapse of the Soviet Union in 1991, Estonia raised the question of a return to the borders under the Treaty of Tartu. Estonia dropped this claim in November 1995. Estonia and Russia signed and ratified the Estonian-Russian Border Treaty, and it went into effect 18 May 2005: the preamble noted that the international border had partly changed, in accordance with Article 122 of the Estonian Constitution.

After the restoration of Estonian independence in 1991, there have been some disputes about the Estonian-Russian border in the Narva area, as the new constitution of Estonia (adopted in 1992) recognises the 1920 Treaty of Tartu border to be currently legal. The Russian Federation, however, considers Estonia to be a successor of the Estonian SSR and recognises the 1945 border between two former national republics. Officially, Estonia has no territorial claims in the area, which is also reflected in the new Estonian-Russian border treaty, according to which Ivangorod remains part of Russia. Although the treaty was signed in 2005 by the foreign ministers of Estonia and Russia, Russia took its signature back, after Estonian parliament added a reference to the Tartu Peace Treaty in the preamble of the law ratifying the border treaty. A new treaty was signed by the foreign ministers in 2014.

== Politics ==
=== Government ===
Johannes Käbin, leader of the Communist Party of Estonia from 1950 to 1978

The legislative body of the Estonian SSR was the Supreme Soviet that represented the highest body of state power accordance with the Constitution.

The Presidium of the Supreme Soviet was the permanent body of the Supreme Council. It consisted of a Chairman of the Presidium, two vice-chairmen, Secretary and 9 members. Was elected to the Presidium of the 25th for the first time August 1940th The Presidium of the law and the decisions adopted. Between sessions of the Supreme Council met in some of its functions: changes to the legislation of the Estonian SSR, Soviet ministries and state committees and to the abolition of the SSR Council of Ministers and the persons appointment and removal of the Supreme Council for approval by relevant laws.

=== Military ===
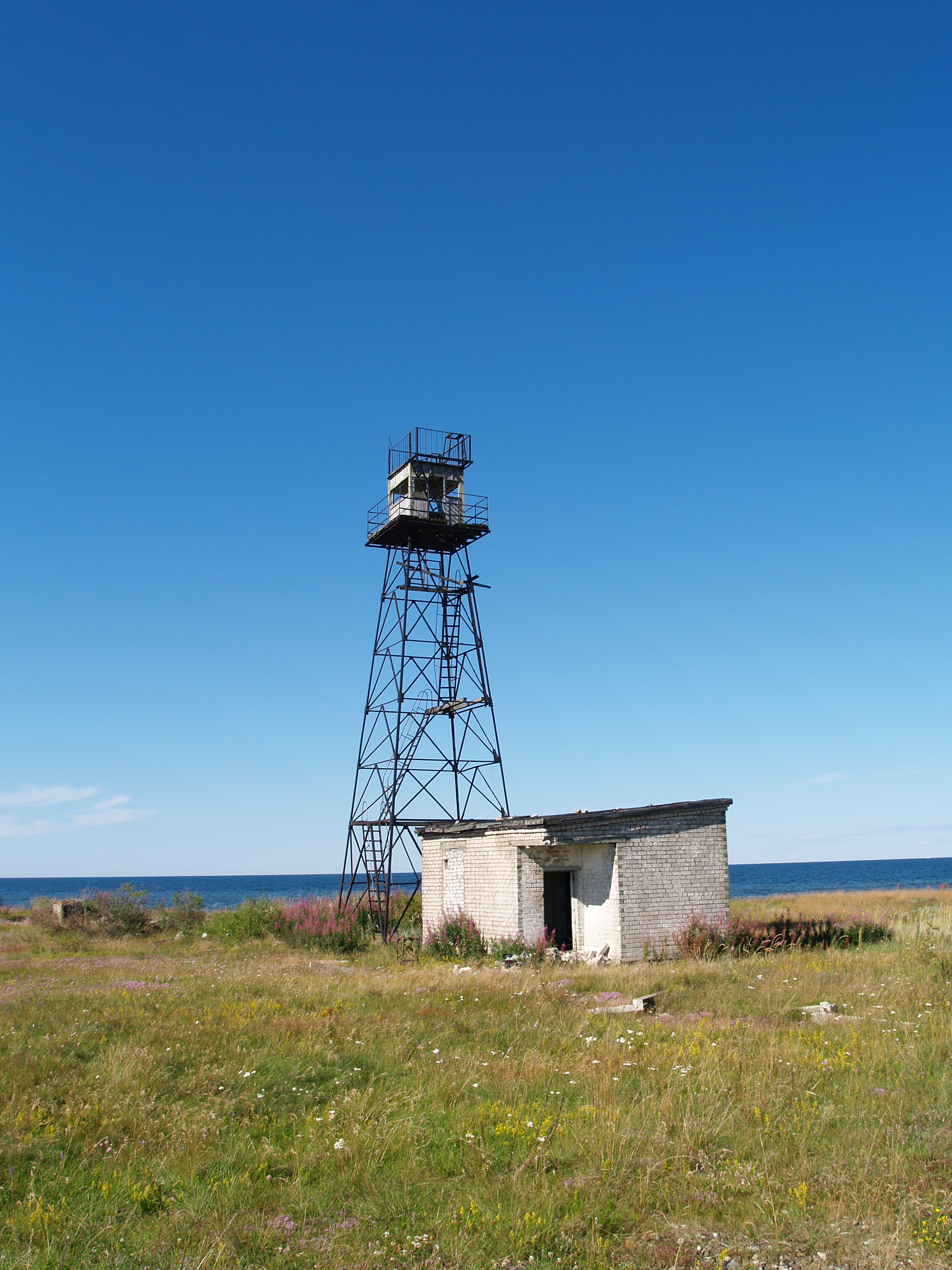
Former Soviet Border Guard observation post in Estonia.

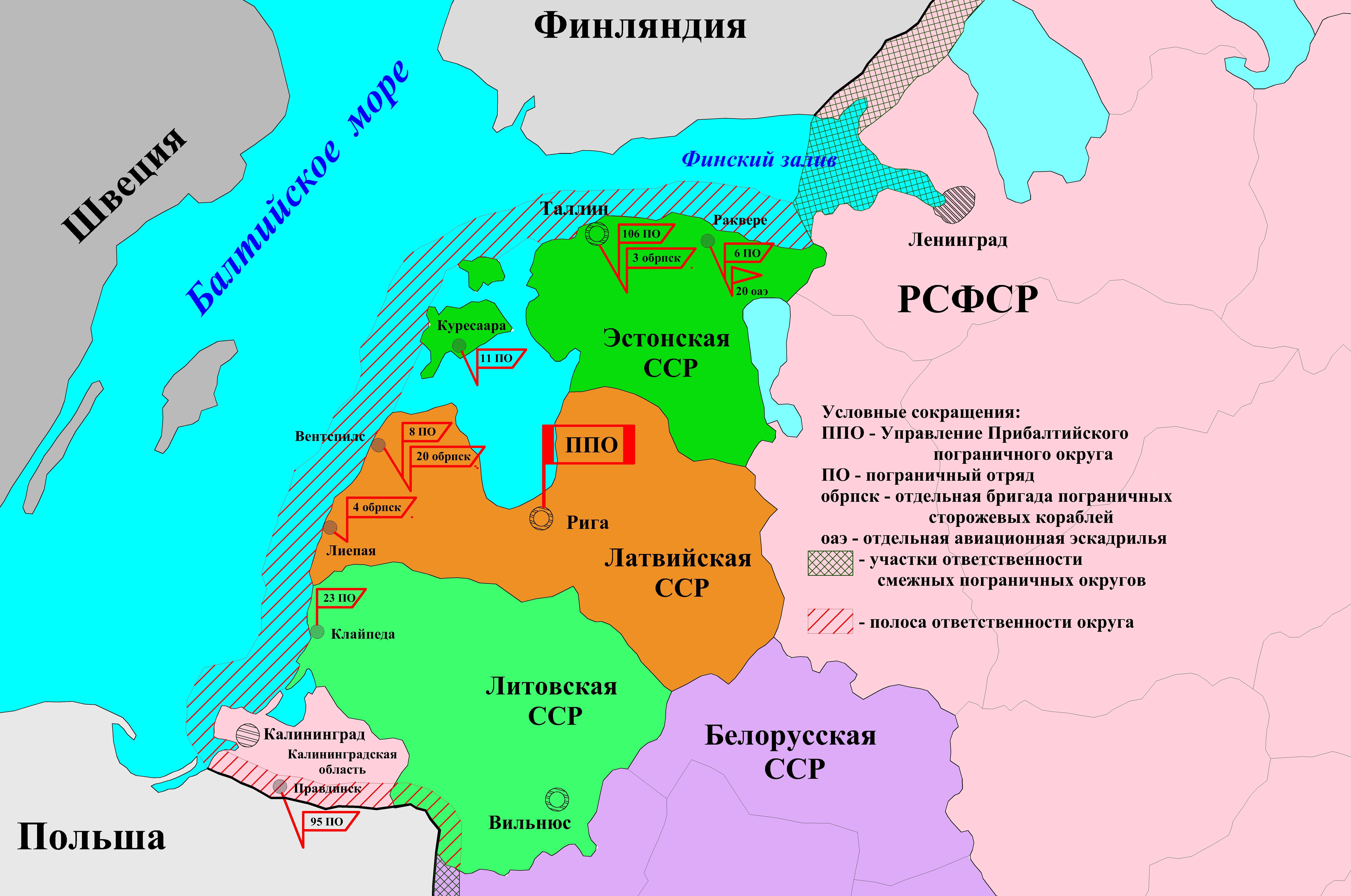
Detachments of the Red Banner Baltic Border District, 1991

The Estonian Soviet Socialist Republic did not have armed forces of its own. Because of the strategic geographical location, Estonia was considered as a strategic zone for the Soviet Armed Forces. The territory was therefore heavily militarised and added to the Soviet Baltic Military District which included a strong presence of the Soviet Air Defence Forces, Navy and also the Strategic Rocket Forces. The Baltic Military District included the following units:

- Ground units:
  - 144th Guards Motor Rifle Division, (Tallinn)
  - 182nd Guard Motorised Rifle Regiment (Klooga)
  - 188th Guard Motorised Rifle Regiment (Klooga)
  - 254th Guard Motorised Rifle Regiment (Tallinn)
  - 148th Independent Recon-Battalion (Klooga)
  - 295th Independent Engineer-Battalion (Klooga)
  - 228th Tank Regiment (Keila)
  - 450th Artillery Regiment (Klooga)
- 2nd Separate Air Defense Army
  - 366th Interceptor Aviation Regiment (Pärnu)
  - 384th Interceptor Aircraft Regiment (Tallinn)
  - 425th Interceptor Aviation Regiment (Haapsalu)
  - 655th Interceptor Aviation Regiment (Pärnu)
  - 656th Interceptor Aviation Regiment (Tapa)
- Other air regiments
  - 66th Soviet Attack Air Regiment (Kunda)
  - 192nd Military Transport Aviation Regiment (Tartu)
  - 196th Military Transport Aviation Regiment (Tartu)
  - 132nd Heavy Bomber Aviation Regiment, 326th Heavy Bomber Aviation Division (Tartu)
- Naval units:
  - Baltic Fleet (Tallinn-Paldiski)
  - 170th Naval Shturmovik Aviation Regiment (Ämari)
  - 321st Naval Shturmovik Aviation Regiment (Ämari)

Military training was provided by the Tallinn Higher Military-Political Construction School.

There was also a strong presence of the Soviet Border Guard in Estonia.

== Economy ==
In the Soviet system, all local proceeds were initially appropriated into the federal budget at Moscow, and some of them were then invested back in the local economies. The figures for those investments were made available to the public, thus promoting a positive impression of the Soviet Federal Centre's contributions to the periphery, the Baltic states included. Investment figures alone, however, do not represent actual income; rather, they resemble the spending side of the national budget. In Estonian SSR by 1947, the private sector had entirely disappeared, accompanied by a rapid industrialization that occurred soon after Soviet reoccupation. Soviet planners expanded oil shale mining and processing in the late 1940s, taking over that industry in northeast section of Estonia. In the 1970s, the Soviet economy experienced stagnation, exacerbated by the growth of a shadow economy.

National income per capita was higher in Estonia than elsewhere in the USSR (44% above the Soviet average in 1968), however, the income levels exceeded those of the USSR in independent Estonia as well. Official Estonian sources maintain that Soviet rule had significantly slowed Estonia's economic growth, resulting in a wide wealth gap in comparison with its neighboring countries (e.g. Finland and Sweden). For example, Estonian economy and standard of living were similar to that in Finland prior to World War II. Despite Soviet and Russian claims of improvements in standards, even three decades after World War II Estonia was rife with housing and food shortages and fell far behind Finland not only in levels of income, but in average life span. Eastern Bloc economies experienced an inefficiency of systems without competition or market-clearing prices that became costly and unsustainable and they lagged significantly behind their Western European counterparts in terms of per capita Gross Domestic Product. Estonia's 1990 per capita GDP was $10,733 compared to $26,100 for Finland. Estonian sources estimate the economic damage directly attributable to the second Soviet occupation (from 1945 to 1991) to lie in the range of hundreds of billions of dollars. Similarly, the damage to Estonian ecology were estimated at US$4 billion.

=== Resources ===
On 21 May 1947, the Central Committee of the All-Union Communist Party (bolsheviks) authorised collectivization of Estonian agriculture. Initially it was implemented with great difficulties in the Baltic republics but it was facilitated by mass deportations of dissident farmers, termed 'kulaks'. As a result, by the end of April 1949, half of the remaining individual farmers in Estonia had joined kolkhozes. 99.3% of farms had been collectivised by 1957.

=== Industry and environment ===
A number of large-volume capital investments were undertaken by the Soviet central power to exploit resources on Estonian territory of oil shale, lumber and, later, uranium ore, as part of the postwar reconstruction program. The first Five Year Plan, called the fourth Five Year Plan, prescribed a total of 3.5 billion roubles of investments for enterprises in Estonia.

One of the important goals in this reformation of Estonia's economy was providing economic support to Leningrad. To this end, 40% of the total capital investments of the fourth Five Year Plan to be spent in Estonia were intended for investments in oil shale mining infrastructure. Gas-rich oil shale was delivered to Leningrad via a specially built pipeline starting from 1948; gas from this very same source did not reach Tallinn until 1953. In 1961, 62.5% of the gas produced was still delivered to Leningrad.

By the end of 1954, 227,000 apartments in Leningrad were supplied with gas using the output of Kohtla-Järve; only about three percent of that, or 6,041 apartments, had been supplied in Tallinn.

== Demographics ==
=== Soviet deportations and repressions ===
Mass deportations of ethnic Estonians during the Soviet era together with migration into Estonia from other parts of the Soviet Union resulted in the proportion of ethnic Estonians in the country decreasing from 88% in 1934 to 62% in 1989. While the Baltic republics had the highest living standard in the Soviet Union and high rates of industrialisation, the ethnic Estonians in Estonian SSR (similarly to Latvians in Latvian SSR, but unlike Lithuanians in Lithuanian SSR) suffered a sharp decline of their proportion in the total population due to the large-scale immigration, mostly of Russians. While in 1934 the Estonians comprised 88 percent of the total population of Estonia, by 1959 and 1970 their number had decreased to 75 and 68 percent, respectively (and to 61.5% by 1989).

This decline in percentage was especially severe among the urban and young populations. Within 11 years between 1959 and 1970 the proportion of Estonians in Tallinn declined by as much as 4%, from 60% to 56% of the total population. Population growth throughout the existence of the Estonian SSR was mainly due to immigration from other regions of the Soviet Union. Although the percentage of Estonians in the total population of the Estonian SSR declined due to Soviet migration policies, the total number of ethnic Estonians increased over the Soviet period as a whole. This was due to a positive natural growth rate of some 1 or 2 thousand per year. As an example, in 1970, the number of live births of Estonians was 14,429 and the number of deaths was 12,356, giving natural increase of 2,073 ethnic Estonians.

In 1940–1941 and 1944–1951 during the Soviet deportations from Estonia tens of thousands of Estonian citizens were forcibly resettled to Siberia. During the first year of occupation, 1940–1941, alone, an estimated 43,900 lives were irrecoverably lost, not counting refugees. The following three-year Nazi occupation brought with it a loss of 32,740 lives, again not counting refugees. Another 16,000 deaths were caused through Soviet repressions in the years following 1944. During the first year of Soviet occupation (1940–1941) over 8,000 people, including most of the country's leading politicians and military officers, were arrested. About 2,200 of the arrested were executed in Estonia, while most others were moved to prison camps in Russia, from where very few were later able to return.

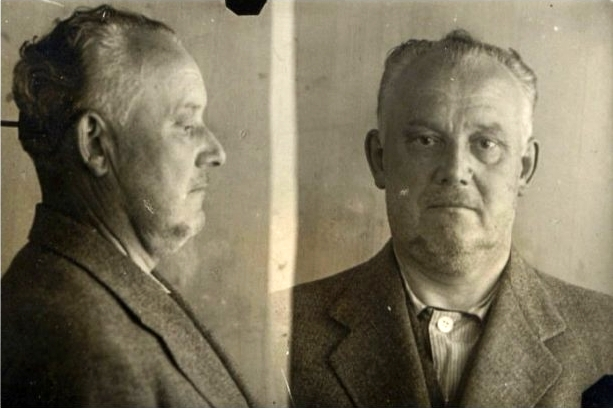
Soviet NKVD mug shot of Estonian general and statesman Johan Laidoner (after his 1940 arrest)

On 19 July 1940, the Commander-in-chief of the Estonian Army Johan Laidoner was captured by the NKVD and deported together with his wife to Penza, RSFSR. Laidoner died in the Vladimir Prison Camp, Russia on 13 March 1953. The President of Estonia, Konstantin Päts was arrested and deported to Ufa on 30 July. He died in a psychiatric hospital in Kalinin (currently Tver) in Russia in 1956.

800 Estonian officers, about half of the total, were executed, arrested or starved to death in prison camps.

A total of 59,732 people is estimated to have been deported from Estonia during the period between July 1940 and June 1941. This included 8 former heads of state and 38 ministers from Estonia, 3 former heads of state and 15 ministers from Latvia, and the then president, 5 prime ministers and 24 other ministers from Lithuania.

The Soviet 1940 occupation of Estonia decimated the local economy, as Moscow began nationalizing private industries and collectivizing smallholding farms. Most of the larger businesses and half of Estonia's housing were nationalised. Savings were destroyed with an imposed artificially low exchange rate for the Estonian kroon to the Soviet rouble.

==== Repressions against ethnic Russians ====
According to Sergei Isakov, almost all societies, newspapers, organizations of ethnic Russians in Estonia were closed and their activists persecuted.

- Sergei Zarkevich, an activist involved with Russian organizations in Estonia. The owner of the "Russian Book" store: arrest order issued by NKVD on 23 June 1940, executed on 25 March 1941.
- Oleg Vasilovsky, a former General in the Russian Imperial Army. Arrest order issued by NKVD on 1 July 1940. Further fate unknown.
- Sergei Klensky, one of the former leaders of the Russian Peasants Labor Party. Arrested on 22 July. On 19 November 1940, sentenced to 8 years in a prison camp. Further fate unknown.
- Mikhail Aleksandrov
- Arseni Zhitkov.

Other ethnic Russians in Estonia arrested and executed by different Soviet War Tribunals in 1940–1941: Ivan Salnikov, Mihhail Arhipo, Vassili Belugin, Vladimir Strekoytov, Vasili Zhilin, Vladimir Utekhin, Sergei Samennikov, Ivan Meitsev, Ivan Yeremeyev, Konstantin Bushuyev, Yegor Andreyev, Nikolai Sausailov, Aleksandr Serpukhov, Konstantin Nosov, Aleksandr Nekrasov, Nikolai Vasilev-Muroman, Aleksei Sinelshikov, Pyotr Molonenkov, Grigory Varlamov, Stepan Pylnikov, Ivan Lishayev, Pavel Belousev, Nikolai Gusev, Leonid Sakharov, Aleksander Chuganov, Fyodor Dobrovidov, Lev Dobek, Andrei Leontev, Ivan Sokolov, Ivan Svetlov, Vladimir Semyonov, Valentin Semenov-Vasilev, Vasili Kamelkov, Georgi Lokhov, Aleksei Forlov, Ivan Ivanov, Vasili Karamsin, Aleksandr Krasilnikov, Aleksandr Zhukov, etc.

=== Urbanization ===
Immediately after the war, major immigration projects were undertaken, labelled "brotherly aid under Stalinist nationality policies". For postwar reconstruction, hundreds of thousands of Russophones were relocated into Estonia, mainly the cities. During the years 1945–1950, the total urban population count grew from 267,000 to 516,000; over 90% of the increase being fresh immigrants.

=== Society ===
In the year 1950, the major problems meriting medical research were declared to be tuberculosis, traumatism, occupational diseases and dysentery. In comparison to the war years, birth rate had increased, mortality (including infant mortality) decreased, and the birth rate again exceeded the death rate. Despite the immense needs for research, the Faculty of Medicine at the Tartu State University (now University of Tartu) suffered from major purges, culminating after March 1950. Altogether, 56 staff of the university were purged; in the Faculty of Medicine, 12 professors of 17 were removed from their positions. They were replaced with less skilled but politically reliable staff.

== Culture ==
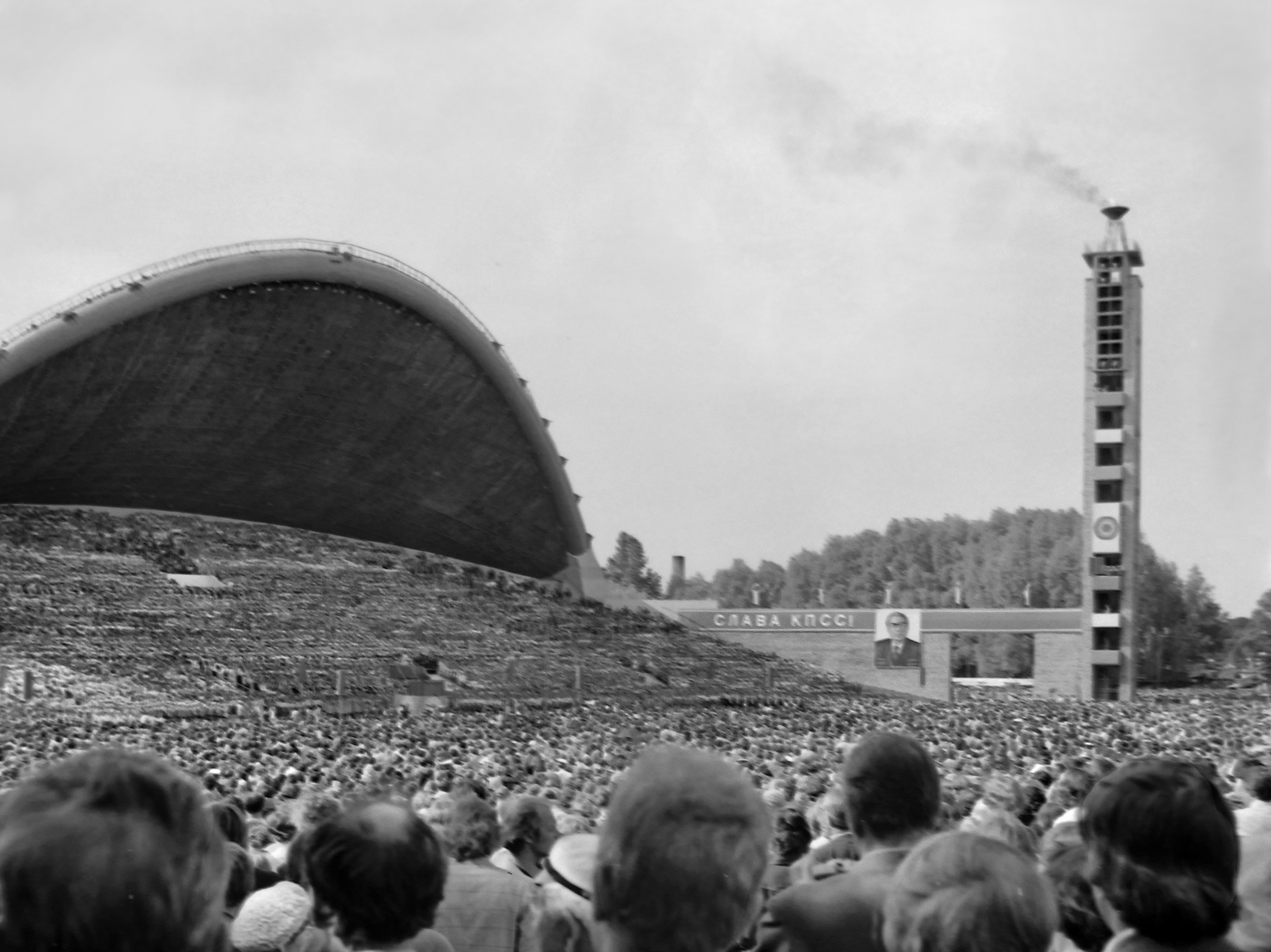
Estonian Song Festival in Tallinn in 1980

=== Sports ===
Tallinn was selected as host of the sailing events of the 1980 Olympics which led to controversy since Western countries had not de jure recognised ESSR as part of USSR. During preparations for the Olympics, sports buildings were built in Tallinn, along with other general infrastructure and broadcasting facilities. This wave of investment included Tallinn TV Tower, Pirita Yachting Centre, Linnahall, hotel "Olümpia" and the new Main Post Office building.

== Historical views ==
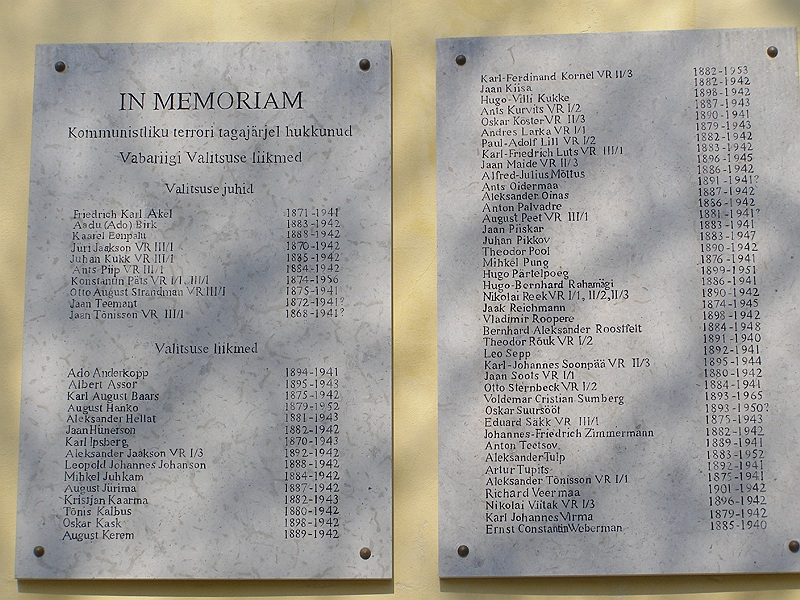
Plaque on Stenbock House, the seat of the Government of Estonia, commemorating government members killed by Soviet forces

Differing interpretations of World War II treaties and their aftermath – specifically regarding the legal continuity of the Estonian state versus the legitimacy of Soviet annexation – form the core of modern diplomatic and historical disputes. While international law recognizes the 1940 Soviet incorporation of Estonia as an illegal military occupation, the Russian government maintains from 1991 that the three Baltic States – Estonia, Latvia, and Lithuania – had voluntarily joined the Soviet Union in 1940.

During the time of glasnost and the reassessment of Soviet history in the USSR, the USSR condemned the 1939 secret protocol between Nazi Germany and itself that had led to the invasion and occupation of the three Baltic countries. The collapse of the Soviet Union led to the restoration of the Republic of Estonia's sovereignty.

According to the European Court of Human Rights, Government of Estonia, European Union, and United States, Estonia remained occupied by the Soviet Union until restoration of its independence in 1991, and the 48 years of Soviet occupation and annexation is not rendered legal by most international governments.

An article in The Wall Street Journal claims that Russian reconsideration of the Soviet annexation of the Baltic states raised concerns among "some historians" that "Kremlin is—quite literally—trying to rewrite history in a way that risks breeding ultranationalism and whitewashing the darkest chapters of Russia's past."

The Russian government maintains that the Soviet annexation of the Baltic states was legitimate and that the Soviet Union annexed those countries due to the Nazi threat at that time.

== See also ==
- Commune of the Working People of Estonia
- Demographics of Estonia
- History of Estonia
- List of Chairmen of the Supreme Soviet of the Estonian Soviet Socialist Republic
- List of Chairmen of the Presidium of the Supreme Soviet of the Estonian Soviet Socialist Republic
- Museum of Occupations, a project by the Kistler-Ritso Estonian Foundation
- Republics of the Soviet Union
