= Nikolai Karotamm =

Estonian politician (1901–1969)

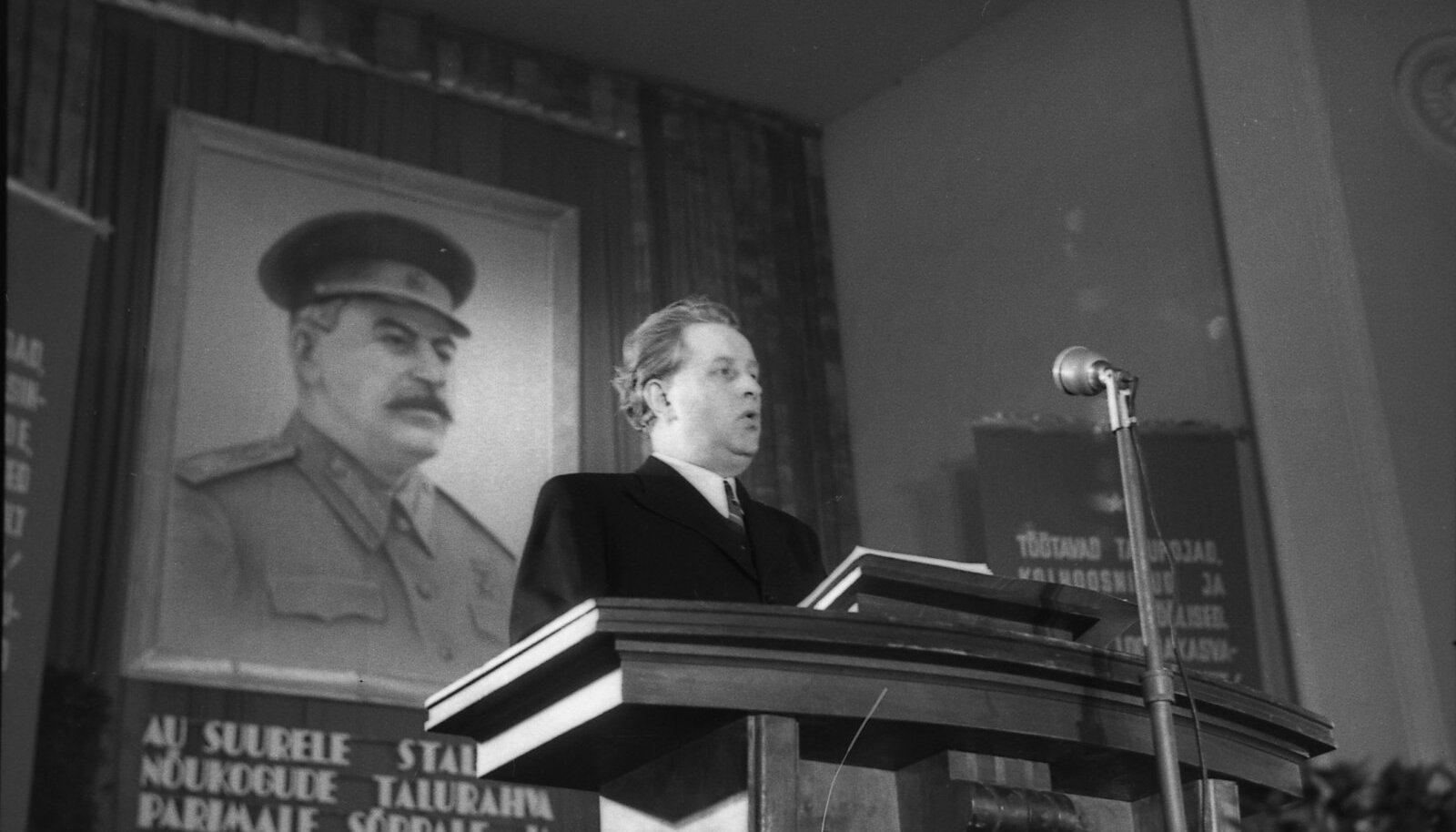
- Karotamm giving a speech in 1948

First Secretary of the Communist Party of Estonia
- In office 28 September 1944 – 26 March 1950
- Preceded by: Karl Säre
- Succeeded by: Johannes Käbin

Personal details
- Born: 23 October 1901 Pärnu, Kreis Pernau, Governorate of Livonia, Russian Empire
- Died: 21 September 1969 (aged 67) Moscow, Soviet Union
- Citizenship: Soviet
- Party: All-Union Communist Party (b) (1927–1969)
- Other political affiliations: Communist Party of Netherlands
- Education: Communist University of the National Minorities of the West
- Profession: Economist

Nikolai Georgievich Karotamm (October 23, 1901 – September 21, 1969) was an Estonian communist politician. He was a member of the Communist Party of Estonia. In 1925, he emigrated to the Netherlands, where in 1926, he joined the Communist Party of the Netherlands.

Following the Second World War, he led multiple repatriation teams to displaced persons camps in Germany.

== Biography ==
Nikolai Karotamm was born in the family of a carpenter and served in the Guard Battalion in 1921.

In 1925, he moved to the Netherlands and joined the Communist Party of the Netherlands. In 1926, he settled in the Soviet Union and studied at the Communist University of the National Minorities of the West. In 1928, Karotamm became a member of the All-Union Communist (b) Party and in the same year was sent to Estonia to re-establish the Estonian Communist Party.

In 1929, he returned to the Soviet Union, graduated from a university, and later became a university lecturer. He also worked as an active agent of the Executive Committee of the Comintern. He was arrested during the Great Purge in 1938, but was soon released without charges.

During the annexation of Estonia by the Soviet Union, Karotamm arrived in Estonia in July 1940 and worked as the editor-in-chief of the newspaper Kommunist from July to August 1940. After the June coup, he was appointed the first secretary of the Tartu City Committee in of the Estonian Communist Party 1941.

In August 1941, he was elected Second Secretary of the Central Committee of the ECP, and from 1940 to 1951, he was a member of the Bureau of the Central Committee of the ECP and the Central Committee of the ECP.

Upon the invasion of Nazi Germany and the subsequent occupation of Baltic states, Karotamm became a member of the Republican Defense Committee of the Estonian SSR. After the Soviet government became aware of the arrest of Karl Säre by the German invaders, Karotamm became the acting leader of the Communist Party of Estonia after he fled to Leningrad.

In 1944, he returned to Estonia and was officially elected as the First Secretary of the Communist Party of Estonia and was simultaneously First Secretary of the Tallinn City Committee of the ECP.

In 1949, he was relieved from his positions and subsequently expelled from the party due to alleged "inappropriate leniency and negligence and the concealment of bourgeois nationalists". He then settled in Moscow and studied in the Academy of Social Sciences under the Central Committee of the CPSU and later worked at the Institute of Economics of the Soviet Academy of Sciences. He received his doctorate of economics in 1964.

Due to his disagreements with his successor Johannes Käbin, Karotamm never returned to Estonia. He died in Moscow and was buried at the Metsakalmistu cemetery.

== Bibliography ==
- Voldemar Pinn, Kes oli Nikolai Karotamm? I. Kultuuritragöödia jälgedes: kompartei kolmest esimesest sekretärist Karl Särest, Nikolai Karotammest, Johannes Käbinist. Haapsalu 1996
- Voldemar Pinn, Kes oli Nikolai Karotamm? II Langi Kolla kroonika. Pärnu 1997?

Party political offices
Preceded by Karl Säre	First Secretary of the Communist Party of Estonia; 1944–1950	Succeeded by Johannes Käbin
