= Communist Party of Estonia =

Estonian branch of the Soviet communist party

Communist Party of Estonia Eestimaa Kommunistlik Partei
- Leader: Karl Säre (1940–1943); Nikolai Karotamm (1943–1950); Johannes Käbin (1950–1978); Karl Vaino (1978–1988); Vaino Väljas (1988–1990)
- Founded: 5 November 1920
- Dissolved: 26 March 1990
- Succeeded by: Estonian Democratic Labour Party
- Youth wing: ELKNÜ
- Ideology: Communism; Marxism–Leninism
- Political position: Far-left
- National affiliation: Communist Party of the Soviet Union (1940–1990)
- Supreme Council of the Republic of Estonia (1990): 27 / 105 (26%)

Party flag

The Communist Party of Estonia (Estonian: Eestimaa Kommunistlik Partei, abbreviated EKP; in Russian: Коммунистическая партия Эстонии) was the Estonian branch of the Soviet Marxist-Leninist party (CPSU). It operated illegally in Estonia prior to 1940, before being merged with the Communist Party of the Soviet Union (CPSU) after the annexation of Estonia by the Soviet Union.

== History ==
The predecessor of EKP was formed on 5 November 1920, when the Central Committee of the Estonian section of the Russian Communist Party (Bolsheviks) was separated from its mother party. During the first half of the 1920s the Bolsheviks' hopes for an immediate world revolution were still high, with Estonian communists hoping to seize power and gain popular support due to the widespread socio-economic crisis. Party activists supported the agenda by organizing communist agitations, allegedly transporting weapons, disseminating communist reading material, protecting undercover agents and covertly acquiring classified information.

It resulted in a standing conflict situation with the Estonian government and authorities. As EKP was not oriented towards the established political system, the organisation was banned in the independent Republic of Estonia from 1920 till 1940. The party would continue to aim for a militant uprising which would unite the Estonian proletariat with the socialist motherland, the Soviet Union.

Although by the early 1920s their popularity had dropped much below from its 1917 peak, it still had significant support amongst the industrial proletariat, students and teachers. It held a strong position within the Estonian trade union movement. In the parliamentary elections EKP's front organisations always gained more than 5% of the vote. However, following the 1 December 1924 failed coup attempt by the Estonian communists, the party rapidly lost support which led to its membership falling to around 70–200. According to the EKP's own records, there were only 150 party members remaining by the time of the Soviet annexation of Estonia in June 1940.

Like in the rest of the Russian empire, the RSDLP branches in the Governorate of Estonia had been ravaged by the split between Bolsheviks and Mensheviks. In 1912 the Bolsheviks started a publication, Kiir, in Narva. In June 1914, the party took a decision to create a special Central Committee of RSDLP(b) of Estonia, named the Northern-Baltic Committee of the RSDLP(b) (Estonian: VSDT(b)P Põhja-Balti Komitee).

After the February Revolution, as in the rest of the empire, the Bolsheviks started to gain popularity with their demands to end the war immediately, as well as their support for fast land reform, universal education and cultural freedom for all nationalities and ethnicities. The Estonian Bolsheviks advocated for co-official status of Estonian alongside Russian, which bolstered their support. During the summer of 1917, elected Bolshevik members along with their supporters achieved a decisive majority in the Tallinn city council, thereby proving their popularity among Estonian voters.

By the end of 1917, Estonian Bolsheviks were stronger than ever — holding control over political power and having significant support. In the elections of the Russian Constituent Assembly, their list got 40.2% of the votes in Estonia and four of six seats allocated to Estonia. The support for the party did however start to decline, and the Constituent Assembly election of January 1918 was never completed. Moreover, the party struggled to create political alliances while their opponents, the Democratic Bloc, was able to initiate cooperation with the Labour Party, Mensheviks and the Socialist-Revolutionary Party. Those parties supported different ideas but were united around the demand for an independent Estonia and wished to redistribute land to the small landless farmers. In contrast to the Democratic Bloc, the Estonian Bolsheviks wished for Estonia to remain within Soviet Russia, despite having introduced Estonian as an official language after their takeover. In the land reform policy, Estonian Bolsheviks continued to support immediate collectivisation and the creation of cooperative farms.

Bolshevik rule in Estonia was ended by the German invasion in the end of February 1918. The party branch continued to function in exile in Soviet Russia. After the German revolution in November 1918, when an independent Estonian national government took office, the Estonian Bolsheviks supported the Lenin's Soviet Russian regime's armed invasion against the new democratic country. By this time, the level of local Estonian popular support for the Bolsheviks had markedly fallen, and they failed to mobilise mass support for "revolutionary warfare". A pro-Leninist puppet government ("Estonian Workers' Commune") was set up in areas occupied by the Red Army, but it had very limited influence. At this time the party branch had been reorganized into the Central Committee of the Estonian Sections of the RCP(b) (Estonian: Venemaa Kommunistliku (bolshevike) Partei Eesti Sektsioonide Keskkomitee). After the war a reorientation was found to be necessary (since Estonia was now an independent state) by the central leadership of the RCP(b) and thus on 5 November 1920 the Communist Party of Estonia (EKP) was founded as a separate party. In the rigged 1940 Estonian parliamentary election, the EKP candidates were included in the "Estonian Working People's Union" bloc.

=== Merger with the CPSU ===
In 1940, EKP was merged into the All-Union Communist Party (bolsheviks). The territorial organization of the AUCP(b) in the Estonian SSR became known as Communist Party of Estonia (Bolsheviks) (EK(b)P).

The EK(b)P was purged in 1950 of many of its original native leaders they were replaced by a number of prominent Estonians who had grown up in Russia. When the AUCP(b) changed its name in 1952 to CPSU, the EK(b)P removed the (b) from its name.

=== Split of 1990 ===
The EKP was divided in 1990, as the pro-sovereignty majority faction of EKP separated itself from the Communist Party of the Soviet Union and became the Estonian Democratic Labour Party (Estonian United Left Party). The remaining pro-Soviet faction reconstituted themselves as the Communist Party of Estonia (CPSU platform).

=== First Secretaries of the Communist Party of Estonia ===
No.	Name (Birth–Death)	Took office	Left office	Notes
1	Karl Säre (1903–c.1943)	August 28, 1940	circa 1943	German prisoner from September 3, 1941
–	Nikolai Karotamm (1901–1969)	September 3, 1941	September 28, 1944	Acting (nominally for absent Säre). In Russian SFSR exile to September 22, 1944.
2	Nikolai Karotamm (1901–1969)	September 28, 1944	March 26, 1950	
3	Johannes Käbin (1905–1999)	March 26, 1950	July 26, 1978	
4	Karl Vaino (1923–2022)	July 26, 1978	June 16, 1988	
5	Vaino Väljas (1931–2024)	June 16, 1988	March 25, 1990	"Leading role" of the Party abolished February 24, 1990.
6	Enn-Arno Sillari (born 1944)	March 25, 1990	August 22, 1991	First secretary of independent Party.
–	Lembit Annus (1941–2018)	December 1990	August 22, 1991	First secretary of pro-Moscow breakaway faction.

=== Second Secretaries of the Communist Party of Estonia ===
- Nikolai Karotamm (August 1940 – September 28, 1944)
- Sergey Sazonov (December 2, 1944 – 1948)
- Georgy Kedrov (October 16, 1948 – August 30, 1949)
- Vasily Kosov (June 1950 – August 20, 1953)
- Leonid Lentsman (August 20, 1953 – January 7, 1964)
- Artur Vader (January 8, 1964 – February 11, 1971)
- Konstantin Lebedev (February 19, 1971 – May 13, 1982)
- Aleksandr Kudryavtsev (May 13, 1982 – December 4, 1985)
- Georgy Aleshin (February 1, 1986 – 1990)

=== Chairman of the Estonian Communist Party ===
No.	Name (Birth–Death)	Took office	Left office	Notes
1	Vaino Väljas (1931–2024)	March 25, 1990	August 22, 1991	"Leading role" of the Party abolished February 24, 1990.

=== Prominent Estonian communists ===
- Viktor Kingissepp
- Jakob Palvadre
- Harald Tummeltau
- Jaan Anvelt
- Karl Säre
- August Kork
- Johannes Vares

== See also ==
- Young Communist League of Estonia
