= Copper tubing =

Type of metal tubing

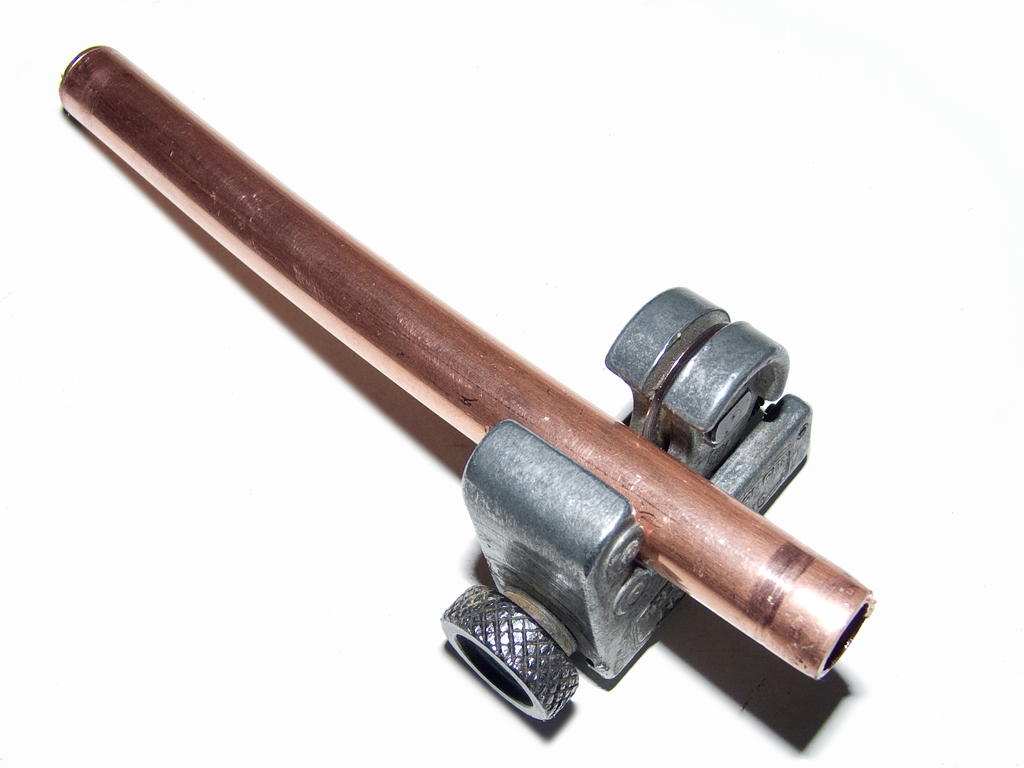
Soft copper tubing in a close quarters tubing cutter

Copper tubing is available in two basic types of tube—plumbing tube and air conditioning/refrigeration (ACR) tube, and in both drawn (hard) and annealed (soft) tempers. Because of its high level of corrosion resistance, it is used for water distribution systems, oil fuel transfer lines, non-flammable medical-gas systems, and as a refrigerant line in HVAC systems. Copper tubing is joined using flare connection, compression connection, pressed connection, or solder.

== Types ==
=== Soft copper ===
Soft (or ductile) copper tubing can be bent easily to travel around obstacles in the path of the tubing. While the work hardening of the drawing process used to size the tubing makes the copper hard or rigid, it is carefully annealed to make it soft again; it is, therefore, more expensive to produce than non-annealed, rigid copper tubing. It can be joined by any of the three methods used for rigid copper, and it is the only type of copper tubing suitable for flare connections. Soft copper is the most popular choice for refrigerant lines in split-system air conditioners and heat pumps.

=== Rigid copper ===
Rigid copper is a popular choice for water lines. Rigid or "Hard" copper tubing is generally referred to as "pipe". Copper "piping" is referred to by nominal pipe size, or the inner diameter. It is joined using a solder/sweat, roll grooved, compression, or crimped/pressed connection. Rigid copper, rigid due to the work hardening of the drawing process, cannot be bent and must use elbow fittings to go around corners or around obstacles. If heated and allowed to cool in a process called annealing, rigid copper will become soft and can be bent/formed without cracking.

== Connections ==
=== Soldered ===
Solder fittings are smooth and easily slip onto the end of a tubing section. The joint is then heated using a torch, which is usually propane gas, and the solder is melted into the connection. When the solder cools, it forms a very strong bond that can last for decades. Solder-connected rigid copper is the most popular choice for water supply lines in modern buildings. In situations where many connections must be made at once (such as plumbing of a new building), solder offers much quicker and much less expensive joinery than compression or flare fittings. The term sweating is sometimes used to describe the process of soldering pipes. The filling material used for the joints has a melting point that is below 800 °F (427 °C).

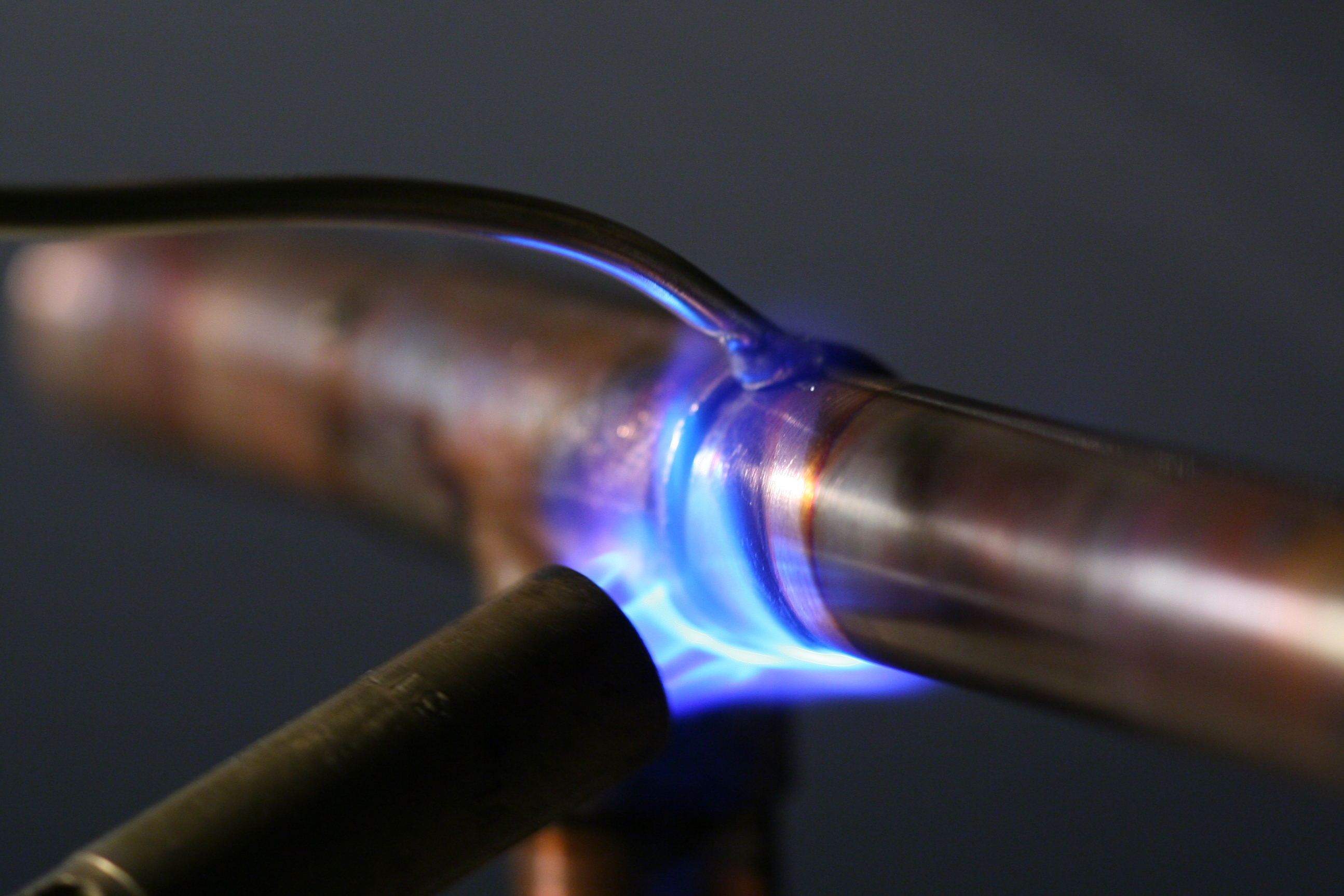
Propane torch soldering copper tube

=== Brazed connection ===
Brazing is a metal-joining process in which two or more metal items are joined by melting and flowing a filler metal into the joint, the filler metal having a lower melting point than the adjoining metal.

Brazing differs from welding in that it does not involve melting the work pieces and from soldering in using higher temperatures for a similar process while also requiring much more closely fitted parts than when soldering. The filler metal flows into the gap between close-fitting parts by capillary action. The filler metal is brought slightly above its melting (liquidus) temperature while protected by a suitable atmosphere, usually a flux. It then flows over the base metal (in a process known as wetting) and is then cooled to join the work pieces together. A major advantage of brazing is the ability to join the same or different metals with considerable strength. The filling material used for the joints has a melting point that is above 800 °F (427 °C).

=== Compression ===
Compression fittings use a soft metal or thermoplastic ring (the compression ring, "olive" or "ferrule"), which is squeezed onto the pipe and into the fitting by a compression nut. The soft metal conforms to the surface of the tubing and the fitting and creates a seal. Compression connections do not typically have the long life that sweat connections offer but are advantageous in many cases because they are easy to make using basic tools. A disadvantage in compression connections is that they take longer to make than sweat and sometimes require re-tightening over time to stop leaks.

=== Flare ===
Flare connections require that the end of a tubing section be spread outward in a bell shape using a flare tool. Only soft copper can be flared. A flare nut then compresses this bell-shaped end onto a male fitting. Flare connections are a labor-intensive method of making connections but are quite reliable over the course of many years.

=== Crimped ===
Crimped connections, also called pressed fittings, are special copper fittings that are permanently attached to rigid copper tubing with a manual or powered crimper. The fittings, manufactured with sealant already inside, slide over the tubing to be connected. Thousands of pounds-force per square inch of pressure are used to deform the fitting and compress the sealant against the inner copper tubing, creating a water-tight seal. The advantages of this method are that it should last as long as the tubing, it takes less time to complete than other methods, it is cleaner in both appearance and the materials used to make the connection, and no open flame is used during the connection process. The disadvantages are that the fittings used are harder to find and cost significantly more than sweat-type fittings.

=== Push-to-connect ===
Push-to-connect, also known as push-to-lock or simply push, fittings are simply pushed onto the end of a tube, and are kept in place by teeth inside the fitting. No wrenches or other special tools are needed to install, other than tools to cut and deburr the tube. Unlike soldered fittings, they can be installed on tubes that are wet at installation time.

== Sizes ==
Copper Tubing Sizes (CTS) for Plumbing
Nominal size	Outside diameter (OD) [in (mm)]	Inside diameter (ID) [in (mm)]		
Nominal size	Outside diameter (OD) [in (mm)]	Type K	Type L	Type M
1/4	3/8 (9.5)	0.305 (7.747)	0.315 (8.001)	
3/8	1/2 (12.7)	0.402 (10.211)	0.430 (10.922)	0.450 (11.430)
1/2	5/8 (15.875)	0.528 (13.411)	0.545 (13.843)	0.569 (14.453)
5/8	3/4 (19.05)	0.652 (16.561)	0.668 (16.967)	0.690 (17.526)
3/4	7/8 (22.225)	0.745 (18.923)	0.785 (19.939)	0.811 (20.599)
1	1 1/8 (28.575)	0.995 (25.273)	1.025 (26.035)	1.055 (26.797)
1 1/4	1 3/8 (34.925)	1.245 (31.623)	1.265 (32.131)	1.291 (32.791)
1 1/2	1 5/8 (41.275)	1.481 (37.617)	1.505 (38.227)	1.527 (38.786)
2	2 1/8 (53.975)	1.959 (49.759)	1.985 (50.419)	2.009 (51.029)
2 1/2	2 5/8 (66.675)	2.435 (61.849)	2.465 (62.611)	2.495 (63.373)
3	3 1/8 (79.375)	2.907 (73.838)	2.945 (74.803)	2.981 (75.717)

=== United States, Canada, and Brazil ===
Common wall-thicknesses of copper tubing in the U.S., Canada and India are "Type K", "Type L", "Type M", and "Type DWV":

- Type K has the thickest wall section of the three types of pressure rated tubing and is commonly used for deep underground burial, such as under sidewalks and streets, with a suitable corrosion protection coating or continuous polyethylene sleeve as required by the plumbing code. In the United States, it usually has green-colored printing. This pipe designation is used in the Refrigeration Industry.
- Type L has a thinner pipe wall section and is used in residential and commercial water supply and pressure applications. In the United States, it usually has blue-colored printing.
- Type M has an even thinner pipe wall section and is used in residential and commercial low-pressure heating applications. In the United States, it usually has red-colored printing.
- Type DWV has the thinnest wall section and is generally only suitable for unpressurized applications, such as drain, waste, and vent (DWV) lines. In the United States, it usually has yellow or light orange colored printing, common sizes being 1 1/4, 1 1/2, and 2-inch copper tube size.

Types K and L are generally available in both hard drawn straight sections and in rolls of soft annealed tubing, whereas type M and DWV are usually only available in hard drawn straight sections.

Note: Types "L" and "M" are often mistakenly identified as purposed for "hot" or "cold" applications by novice home repairers by their red and blue printing. This is an incorrect assumption. The printing only references the gauge thickness of the pipe, which may affect application choice and address quality/durability concerns for the product selected.

In the North American plumbing industry, the size of copper tubing is designated by its nominal diameter, which is 1/8th inch less than the outside diameter. The inside diameter varies according to the thickness of the pipe wall, which differs according to pipe size, material, and grade: the inside diameter is equal to the outside diameter, less twice the wall thickness.

The North American refrigeration industry uses copper pipe designated ACR (air conditioning and refrigeration field services) pipe and tubing, which is sized directly by its outside diameter (OD) and a typed letter indicating wall thickness. Therefore, one-inch nominal type L copper tube and 1 1/8th inch type D ACR tube are exactly the same size, with different size designations. ACR pipe and tubing is cleaned after manufacturing and then capped and sealed, to ensure that the tubing is free from grains of metal and processing residues that could degrade components of a refrigerant system, the circulating refrigerant itself, or the compressor oil. Type ACR tubing may be high purity copper without any trace residue of de-oxygenating material, low trace phosphate residue, or high trace phosphate residue, while tubing made to carry water is either level of trace phosphate deoxygenating residue.

Except for those differences between ACR (types A and D) and plumbing (types K, L, M, and DWV) pipes, the type only indicates wall thickness and does not affect the outside diameter of the tube. Type K 1/2 inch, type L 1/2 inch, and type D 5/8 inch ACR all have the same outside diameter of 5/8 inch.

In both the U.S. and Canada, copper pipe and fittings are sold in imperial units only as metric sizes are not manufactured for use in North America. Many Canadian merchants give approximate metric sizes for construction products, but in the case of copper pipes and fittings, these approximations are not interchangeable with metric components.

=== Europe ===
Common wall-thicknesses in Europe are "Type X", "Type Y", and "Type Z", defined by the EN 1057 standard.

- Type X is the most common and is used in above-ground service, including drinking water supply, hot and cold water systems, sanitation, central heating, and other general purpose applications.
- Type Y is a thicker walled pipe, used for underground works and heavy duty requirements, including hot and cold water supply, gas reticulation, sanitary plumbing, heating and general engineering.
- Type Z is a thinner walled pipe, also used for above-ground service, including drinking water supply, hot and cold water systems, sanitation, central heating and other general purpose applications.

In the plumbing trade, the size of copper tubing is measured by its outside diameter in millimeters. Common sizes are 15 mm and 22 mm. Other sizes include 18 mm, 28 mm, 35 mm, 42 mm, 54 mm, 66.7 mm, 76.1 mm, and 108 mm outside diameters.

Tubing in 8 mm and 10 mm outside diameters is called a "micro bore" and is easier to install, although there is a slightly increased risk of blockage from scale or debris. It is sometimes used for central heating systems, and 15 mm adapters are used to connect it to radiator valves.

=== Australia ===
In Australia, copper tubing classifications are "Type A", "Type B", "Type C", and "Type D":

Copper pipes in Australia are referenced to their DN (diamètre nominal) number, which is a nominal millimeter equivalent to their actual Imperial size. For example, DN20 is the size for copper pipe with an outside diameter of 19.05 mm or 3/4 inch. While pipe sizes in Australia are inch-based, they are classified by outside rather than inside diameter (e.g., a nominal 3/4 inch copper pipe in Australia has measured diameters of 0.750 inches outside and 0.638 inches inside, whereas a nominal 3/4 inch copper pipe in the U.S. and Canada has measured diameters of 0.875 inch outside and 0.745 inch inside.

=== New Zealand ===
New Zealand has the same plumbing code as Australia, and both use inch-based tubes denominated in millimeters. However, New Zealand's sizes are based on the "nominal bore" rather than "nominal diameter" (e.g., NZ size 20 measures 0.750 inches inside diameter, as opposed to Australian DN20 which measures 0.750 inches outside diameter). Effectively, New Zealand pipes measure the same as U.S. and Canadian ones.

== Lead leaching ==
Generally, copper tubes are soldered directly into copper or brass fittings, although compression, crimp, or flare fittings are also used.

Formerly, concerns with copper supply tubes included the lead used in the solder at joints (50% tin and 50% lead). Some studies have shown significant leaching of the lead into the potable water stream, particularly after long periods of low usage, followed by peak demand periods, with soft acidic water. In hard water applications, shortly after installation, the interior of the pipes will be coated with the deposited minerals that had been dissolved in the water, and therefore the vast majority of exposed lead is prevented from entering the potable water. Building codes throughout the U.S. and the Safe Drinking Water Act Amendments of 1986 require the use of virtually "lead-free" (<0.2% lead) solder or filler metals in plumbing fittings and appliances.

In Australia, copper tubes are generally brazed with silver-containing brazing rods rather than soldered. This type of connection ensures a stronger bond between pipework and does not utilize any lead-based materials. In Australia, copper pipes are used for both water and gas connections. The use of galvanized or black iron is permitted by the Australian Standards but is not common practice.

== Corrosion ==
Copper water tubes are susceptible to cold water pitting caused by contamination of the pipe interior, typically with soldering flux; erosion corrosion caused by high speed or turbulent flow; and stray current corrosion caused by poor electrical wiring technique, such as improper grounding and bonding.

== Pinholes ==
Pinhole leaks with pitting initiating on the exterior surface of the pipe can occur if copper piping is improperly grounded or bonded. The phenomenon is known technically as stray current corrosion or electrolytic pitting. Pin-holing due to poor grounding or poor bonding occurs typically in homes where the original plumbing has been modified; homeowners may find that a new plastic water filtration device or plastic repair union has interrupted the water pipe's electrical continuity to ground, when they start seeing pinhole water leaks after a recent install. Damage occurs rapidly, usually becoming obvious about six months after the ground interruption. Correctly installed plumbing appliances will have a copper bonding jumper cable connecting the interrupted pipe sections. Pinhole leaks from stray current corrosion can result in high plumbing bills and require the replacement of the entire water line. The cause is fundamentally an electrical defect, not a plumbing defect; once the plumbing damage is repaired, an electrician should promptly be consulted to evaluate the grounding and bonding of the entire plumbing and electrical systems.

The difference between a ground and a bond is that bonding joins conductors to ensure they are at the same voltage, grounding joins conductors to electrodes that are at the local earth potential. See Ground, for a complete description.

Stray current corrosion occurs because: 1) the piping system has been connected accidentally or intentionally to a DC voltage source; 2) the piping does not have metal-to-metal electrical continuity throughout its length; or 3) if the voltage source is AC, copper oxide or one or more naturally occurring minerals coating the pipe interior may act as a rectifier, converting AC current to DC. The impressed DC voltage causes dissolved ions in the water within the piping to move carrying charge as they do. Electrical current is carried by dissolved ions across a non-conductive section (a plastic filter housing, for example), to the pipe on the opposite side. Pitting occurs at the electrically positive side (the anode), which may happen to be either upstream or downstream with respect to the water flow direction. Pitting occurs because the electrical voltage ionizes the pipe's interior copper metal, which reacts chemically with dissolved minerals in the water, creating copper salts; these copper salts are soluble in water and wash away. Microscopic pits eventually grow and consolidate to form pinholes. When one is discovered, there are almost certainly more that have not yet leaked. A complete discussion of stray current corrosion can be found in chapter 11, section 11.4.3, of Handbook of Corrosion Engineering, by Pierre Roberge.

Detecting and eliminating poor bonding is relatively straightforward. Detection is accomplished using a simple DC voltmeter, with test probe leads placed in various locations in the plumbing. A probe on a hot pipe and a probe on a cold pipe can be used to determine if ground continuity was interrupted at a hot water heater. Anything beyond a few millivolts is significant, and potentials of 200 mV are common. The potential difference is often largest at the point where continuity is interrupted. The measured electrical potential father away is diminished by the electrochemical reaction that causes pipe corrosion. The missing bond is often located near the cold water inlet to the building where filtration and treatment equipment are usually added. Pinhole leaks can occur anywhere downstream or upstream from the interruption of electrical continuity.

The problem can be corrected by installing bronze ground clamps on the plumbing on either side of the dielectric gap and joining them with a copper cable #6 AWG in diameter or larger. See NFPA 70, the U.S. National Electrical Code (NEC), for the correct bonding conductor wire size for a particular building.

A similar bonding jumper wire is used between the inlet and outlet of gas meters, but here the purpose is to avoid having a substantial voltage difference between the building's grounding electrode(s) and buried natural gas lines appear across the gas meter during the brief interval when a line to ground fault is conducting before the overcurrent protection device interrupts the current. A failure if the building's grounding electrode(s) can also result in the earth current being carried to the buried natural gas service pipe. The bonding jumper carries ground current around the meter instead of through it, to ensure that all parts of the meter are at the same potential.

If building occupants are experiencing shocks or large sparks from plumbing fixtures or pipes, the building's electrical service should immediately be switched off at the service entrance and an electrician should be consulted to resolve the shock and fire hazard. it is more serious than a missing bond. Larger voltages may be caused by a live electrical wire bridging to the plumbing and improper or missing plumbing system grounding, a failure of the ground electrodes, or a failure of the connection between the grounded (neutral) conductor and the grounding (earth) conductor, which poses an imminent risk of insulation breakdown, electrical shock, and fire .

== See also ==
- Refrigeration
- Plumbing
- Pipefitter
- Piping and plumbing fitting
