= OT =

OT or Ot may refer to:

== Arts and entertainment ==
- OT (band), a Serbian pop/rock band
- Ot, stage name of Anupong Prathompatama, a member of the Thai rock band Carabao
- Operation Transformation (TV series), an Irish health and fitness programme
- OT: Our Town, a 2002 documentary film about a high school in Compton, California that stages Thornton Wilder's Our Town
- Operación Triunfo (Spanish TV series), a Spanish reality television talent show
- Ot, the title character of Ot el bruixot, a Spanish comic strip
- Ot, one of the two main characters of Ot en Sien, a Dutch children's book series
- Star Wars original trilogy, first three films in the Star Wars franchise

== Businesses and organizations ==
- Oakville Transit, the bus company serving Oakville, Ontario, Canada
- Obsession Telescopes, an American telescope maker
- Oranga Tamariki, a New Zealand government department
- Organisation Todt, a civil and military engineering group of Nazi Germany
- Oyu Tolgoi, a mine in Mongolia

== Religion ==
- Old Testament, the first part of the Christian Bible
- Operating Thetan, a spiritual state in Scientology
- Ot Ene, the Mongolian goddess of marriage

== Science and technology ==
=== Medicine ===
- Occupational therapy
  - Occupational therapist
- Operating theatre
  - (not to be confused with operational theatre, or war theatre)
- Oxytocin, a mammalian hormone

=== Other uses in science and technology ===
- Oblivious transfer, a type of cryptography protocol
- Operational technology, hardware/software technology dedicated to physical assets in an enterprise
- Operational transformation, an optimistic concurrency control method for group editing
- Optimality theory, a linguistic model
- Oxygenated treatment, used to reduce corrosion in a boiler
- Optical telegraph, used to convey textual information by means of visual signals

== People ==
- Ot of Urgell (c. 1065–1122), Catholic saint and bishop of Urgell
- Ot de Montcada, 11th century Catalan troubadour
- Ot Pi Isern (fl. 1988–?), Spanish bike-trials rider
- Ot Louw (1946–2021), Dutch film editor
- Oswald Tschirtner (1920–2007), Austrian artist also known as O.T.

== Other acronyms ==
- Offensive tackle, either of two football positions
- Overtime (sports), a sports game past regulation because of a tie game
- Off topic
- Overtime, a designation indicating working past normal work hours

== Other uses ==
- Ot (Cyrillic) (Ѿ, ѿ), a letter of the early Cyrillic alphabet
- Lemon tea, Hong Kong beverage, cha chaan teng abbreviation (see Cha chaan teng#Common phrases and abbreviations)
- The OT, a television postgame show of NFL on Fox
- Oakville Trafalgar High School, Oakville, Ontario, Canada
- Otmoor or Ot Moor, an area of wetland and wet grassland in Oxfordshire, England
- Aeropelican, IATA airline designator OT
- O-T map, a type of medieval world map

== See also ==
- Ott (disambiguation)
- O-T Fagbenle (born 1981), a British actor, writer and director, full name Ọlátúndé Ọlátẹ́jú Ọláọlọ́run Fágbénlé
