= Tribocorrosion of Copper Water Tubes =

Effect of corrosion and erosion by water

Tribocorrosion, also known as impingement damage, is the combined effect of corrosion and erosion caused by rapid flowing turbulent water. It is probably the second most common cause of copper tube failures behind Type 1 pitting which is also known as Cold Water Pitting of Copper Tube.

The most significant factors that contribute to erosion corrosion damage are stated to be water chemistry, temperature and velocity. A failure to follow proper installation procedures is also seen as a cause.

Copper water tubes have been used to distribute drinking water within buildings for many years, and hundreds of miles are installed throughout Europe every year. The long life of copper when exposed to natural waters is a result of its thermodynamic stability, its high resistance to reacting with the environment, and the formation of insoluble corrosion products that insulate the metal from the environment. The corrosion rate of copper in most drinkable waters is less than 2.5 μm/year, at this rate a 15 mm tube with a wall thickness of 0.7 mm would last for about 280 years. In some soft waters the general corrosion rate may increase to 12.5 μm/year, but even at this rate it would take over 50 years to perforate the same tube.

== Occurrence ==
If the general water speed or the degree of local turbulence in an installation is high, the protective film that would normally be formed on a copper tube as a result of slight initial corrosion, may be torn off the surface locally, permitting further corrosion to take place at that point. If this process continues it can produce deep localised attack of the type known as erosion-corrosion or impingement damage. The actual attack on the metal is by the corrosive action of the water to which it is exposed while the erosive factor is the mechanical removal of the corrosion product from the surface.

Impingement attack produces highly characteristic water-swept pits, which are often horseshoe shaped, or it can produce broader areas of attack. The leading edge of the pit is frequently undercut by the swirling action of the water. Usually, the surface of the metal within the pits or areas of attack is smooth and carries no substantial corrosion product. Erosion-corrosion is known to occur in pumped-circulation hot water distribution systems, and even in cold water distribution systems, if the water velocities are too high. The factors influencing the attack include the chemical character of the water passing through the system, the temperature, the average water velocity in the system and the presence of any local features likely to induce turbulence in the water stream.

It is unusual for the general water velocity in a system to be so high that impingement attack occurs throughout the whole of the copper pipework. More commonly, the velocity is just sufficiently low for satisfactory protective films to be formed and to remain in position on most of the system, with impingement damage more likely to occur where there is an abrupt change in the direction of water flow giving rise to a high degree of turbulence, such as at tee pieces and elbow fittings. It is not generally realised how great an effect small obstructions can have on the flow pattern of water in a pipe-work system and the extent to which they can induce turbulence and cause corrosion-erosion. For example, it is most important, as far as possible, to ensure that copper tubes cut with a tube cutter are deburred before making the joint. Also a gap between the tube end and the stop in the fitting, due to the tube not having been cut to the correct length and fully inserted into the socket of the fitting, can also induce turbulence in the water stream.

== Recommendations ==
The rate of impingement attack on copper also depends to some extent on the temperature of the water. The maximum velocities for fresh waters at different temperatures recommended in Sweden are given in the table below. These figures are for aerated waters of pH not less than about 7.

Recommended Maximum Water Velocities at Different Temperatures for Copper (m/s)

	10 °C	50 °C	70 °C	90 °C
For pipes that can be replaced:	4.0	3.0	2.5	2.0
For pipes that cannot be replaced:	2.0	1.5	1.3	1.0
For short connections to taps, etc.§:	16.0	12.0	10.0	8.0

§ These velocities give a risk of impingement attack and are acceptable only for small bore connections to taps, flushing cisterns etc., through which water flow is intermittent.

BS 6700 gives the following maximum water velocities although it does note that these are currently under investigation and the velocities specified will be amended if the results of this investigation so require.

Water Temperature °C	Maximum Water Velocity (m/s)
10	3.0
50	3.0
70	2.5
90	2.0

The minimum water speed at which copper pipes suffer impingement attack depends also to some extent on water composition. Aggressive waters that tend to be cupro-solvent are the most likely to give rise to impingement attack. Installations in large buildings where flow rates may be high and water is in continuous circulation are much more susceptible to attack than ordinary domestic installations. A high mineral content or a pH below 7 is likely to increase the possibility of corrosion-erosion occurring while a positive Langelier Index and consequent tendency to deposit a calcium carbonate scale is generally beneficial. The presence or absence of colloidal organic matter is also probably of some importance.

Remedial measures for impingement attack include modifications to the system to reduce the average water velocity, e.g. by using larger diameter tubes or, if appropriate, to lower the pump speed, and/or to redesign the part of the installation concerned to eliminate the cause of local turbulence, e.g. by using slow or swept bends and tee fittings rather than elbows and square tees. It is important to minimise the possibility of any local turbulence occurring by ensuring that the ends of tubes cut with a tube cutter are deburred and that the tubes are inserted fully to the stops in the fitting before the joints are made, as referred to earlier in this section. In some cases, where the above approaches are not possible, the length of copper tube affected can sometimes be replaced by materials more resistant to corrosion-erosion, e.g. 90/10 copper-nickel (BS Designation CN102) using appropriate fittings, or stainless steel to BS 4127:1994.

In an intergranular erosion corrosion of pure copper tube in flowing NaCl solution, it was stated that two critical velocities exist corresponding to the stripping of outer and inner layers and that he layer of oxidized copper grains instead of a continuous Cu2O film was observed. Research has also determined that the intergranular erosion corrosion mechanism for copper in flowing media occurs.

== See also ==
- Oxygenated treatment
- Flow-accelerated corrosion
