= Oaten =

Oaten is a surname. Notable people with the surname include:

- Gemma Oaten (born 1984), English actress
- Mark Oaten (born 1964), British politician
- Max Oaten (born 1935), Australian rules footballer
- Patrick Oaten, Canadian water polo coach

== See also ==
- Otten
