= Ott =

Ott, OTT or O.T.T. may refer to:

== Entertainment ==
- OTT (group), a pop band from the late 1990s
- Ott (record producer), British record producer and musician
- "O.T.T" (song), a song by Fugative
- O.T.T. (TV series), a UK TV programme from the early 1980s presented by Chris Tarrant
- O.T.T., name of the re-release of Exciter's 1988 self-titled album

== Other uses ==
- Ongi kuden (就註法華経口伝) or "The Record of the Orally Transmitted Teachings", a text in Nichiren Buddhism
- Ott (name), a surname and given name, including a list of notable people with the name
- OTT Airlines, a Chinese airline based in Shanghai
- An abbreviation for Ottawa, Ontario, Canada
  - Ottawa Charge, a Professional Women's Hockey League team
  - Ottawa Senators, a National Hockey League team
- Over-the-top media service, a delivery method of video and audio over the Internet, a.k.a. over-the-top television, abbreviated OTT or OtT
  - Over-the-top media services in India
- Over the Top Wrestling, an Irish Wrestling promotion

== See also ==
- Otte
- OT (disambiguation)
