= Hindericus Scheepstra =

Dutch writer (1859–1913)

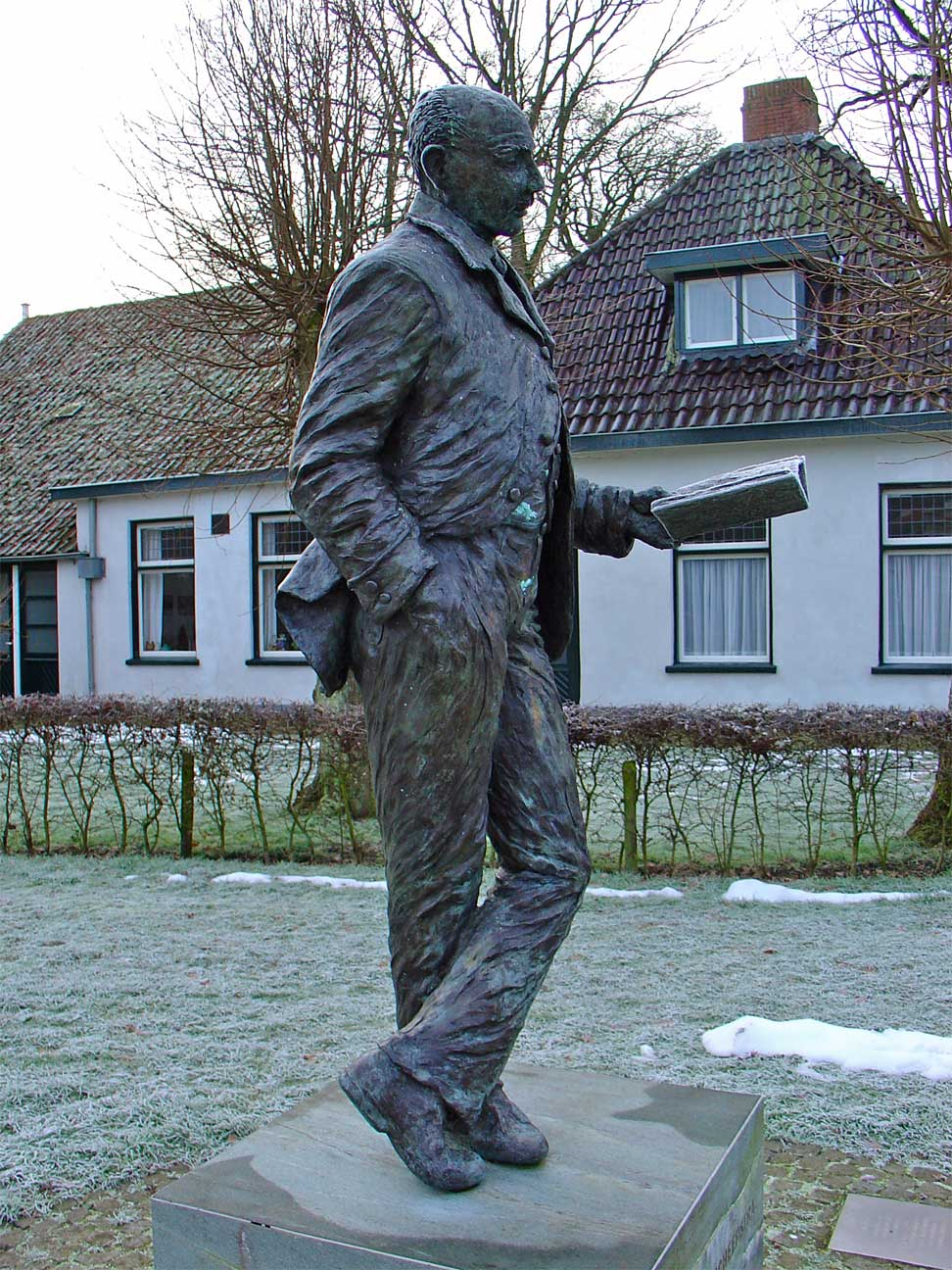
- Statue of Hindericus Scheepstra
- Born: Hindericus Scheepstra; 17 March 1859; Roden, Netherlands
- Died: 8 May 1913 (aged 54); Groningen, Netherlands
- Occupation: Writer

Hindericus Scheepstra (17 March 1859 – 8 May 1913) was a Dutch writer best known for his children's book series Ot en Sien (1902).

== Family and education ==
Hindericus Scheepstra was born in Roden, the last of nine children. His parents were Hindrik Scheepstra en Janna Roeters.

== Bibliography ==
- 1902 - Dicht bij Huis ("Close to home")
- 1904 - Nog bij Moeder ("Still with mother")

== See also ==
- Jan Ligthart
- Ot en Sien
