= Otte =

Otte is a surname and given name. Notable persons with that name include:

Given name

- Otte Brahe (1518–1571), Danish (Scanian) nobleman and statesman
- Otte Krumpen (1473–1569), Marshal of Denmark from 1554 to 1567
- Otte Rømer (c.1330–1409), Norwegian nobleman, state councillor, and landowner
- Otte Rud (1520–1565), Danish admiral during the Northern Seven Years' War
- Otte Wallish (1903–1977), Czech-Israeli graphic designer

Surname

- Carl Otte (1924–2011), American politician
- Carlo Otte (1908–?), German Nazi administrator
- Charles Otte (born 1956), American theatre director, producer, designer and educator
- Christian Otte (1943–2005), Belgian painter
- Christian Otte (politician) (born 1971), German businessman and politician
- Clifford Otte (1933–2026), Wisconsin politician
- Dan Otte (born 1939), American behavioral ecologist
- Eileen Otte (1922–2014), American model agency executive
- Elise Otté (1818–1903), Anglo-Danish linguist, scholar and historian
- Friedrich-Wilhelm Otte (1898–1944), German Wehrmacht general
- Gary Otte (1971–2017), American convicted murderer
- Hans Otte (1926–2007), German composer, pianist, and poet
- Henning Otte (born 1968), German politician
- Katharina Otte (born 1987), German field hockey player
- Marc Otte (born 1947), Belgian diplomat and politician
- Marcel Otte (born 1948), Belgian archaeologist
- Martin Otte, German decathlete
- Max Otte (born 1964), German economist and investment fund manager
- Oscar Otte (born 1993), German tennis player
- Rini Otte (1917–1991), Dutch actress, illustrator, and sculptor
- Tarren Otte (born 1984), Australian synchronized swimmer

== See also ==
- Ott (disambiguation)
- Otten (surname)
- Otter
