= Graping =

Phenomenon in soldering

Graping is a phenomenon marked by the appearance of unreflowed solder particles on top of the solder mass. The solder that is partially coalesced resembles a cluster of grapes, hence the derivation of the phenomenon’s name.

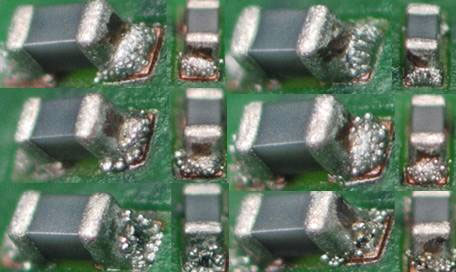
Graping Phenomenon

== Causes ==
Graping occurrence has continued to increase since it was first identified in 2006. The viscosity of the flux decreases as the temperature of the reflow oven increases. Lead-free reflow soldering temperatures are higher, which results in more graping. Graping is also caused by increased surface oxidation. The increased surface oxidation is the result of smaller printed paste deposit volumes that cause a diminished surface area to flux ratio of the solder particle, resulting in flux exhaustion. While solder paste can be manufactured using any size range, there has been a move towards finer particle sizes, especially for fine feature stencil printing. Finer particle sizes places added pressure on the solder paste flux to remove surface oxides, which leaves the outside of the joint not fully coalesced, producing the irregular surface finish known as graping.

== Resolutions ==
The graping phenomenon can be resolved utilizing proper solder materials in addition to correct reflow profile settings. Solder powders are available that provide a tighter distribution range as well as a high oxidation barrier. This barrier not only improves the paste release from the stencil, but also provides an ideal surface area-to-volume ratio. These solder powder characteristics help to eliminate the graping phenomenon. Future solder paste flux formulations provide sufficient activity paired with re-oxidation mitigation capabilities. This pairing means that graping can be resolved as it occurs, which is ideal for miniaturization processes.

There are also steps to take when setting up one's reflow profile to reduce the amount of heat exposure to the solder paste during the reflow process and prevent graping:

- Opt for a ramp to peak profile, as opposed to a soak profile.
- Adjust the belt speed to decrease the total time in oven to a recommended ramp rate of 1 °C/second from ambient to peak.
- Utilize a peak temperature ranging from 235°-240 °C.
- Cut back the time above liquidus (TAL) to 40–60 seconds.
