= Ottens =

Ottens is a surname. Notable people with the surname include:

- Brad Ottens (born 1980), Australian rules football player, brother of Luke
- Lou Ottens (1926–2021), Dutch engineer and inventor
- Luke Ottens (born 1976), Australian rules football player, brother of Brad

== See also ==
- Otten
