= Solderability =

Metalworking measure

The solderability of a substrate is a measure of the ease with which a soldered joint can be made to that material. Good solderability requires wetting (low contact angle) of the substrate by the solder.

== Of metals ==
Solderability varies depending on the type of solder alloy under discussion. The discussion that follows applies only to unspecified electronic solders (which may include solders that contain lead, now banned for use in nearly all electronic equipment made or sold in the EU). Solderability when using lead-free alloys can differ significantly from solderability when using lead based alloys.

Noble metals may be easy to solder but they have brittle joints. The metals in the good category require a large amount of heat therefore oxidation is an issue. To overcome this a flux is required. For carbon steel, low alloy steel, zinc, and nickel the presence of sulfur creates a brittle joint; lower temperatures are used to minimize this problem. The oxides on the surface of aluminium cause wetting issues and special solders must be used to prevent galvanic corrosion issues. Stainless steel and high alloy steel have a low solderability because the chromium alloying element creates oxides that require aggressive fluxes. The only way that the final category of metals can be soldered is by pre-plating them in a metal that is solderable.

In lead‑free assembly, studies of selective soldering have shown that prolonged contact times and elevated solder temperatures can accelerate copper dissolution from pads and nozzles, gradually reducing the available solderable surface and impairing wetting and joint reliability.

Solderability of various metals
Solderability	Metal	Remarks
Excellent	Tin; Cadmium; Gold; Silver; Palladium; Rhodium	Noble metals dissolve easily in solders, resulting in brittle joints.
Good	Copper; Bronze; Brass; Lead; Nickel silver Beryllium copper	High thermal conductivity of these metals requires high heat input during soldering. Oxidizes quickly so proper flux must be used.
Fair	Carbon steel Low alloy steel Zinc; Nickel	Solder joints become brittle in sulfur-rich environments. Avoid higher temperatures in the presence of lubricants (which contain sulfur).
Poor	Aluminium; Aluminium bronze	Tough oxides on the surface prevent wetting (formation of the inter-metallic layers). Solders have to be specially selected to avoid galvanic corrosion problems. Tin-zinc solders have proven to be reliable in joining aluminum to aluminum and aluminum to copper. They most often require flux and brushing with a stainless steel brush to break oxide coating to achieve proper bond.
Difficult	High alloy steel Stainless steels	Too much chromium oxide. The surface needs to be cleaned with an aggressive flux.
Very Difficult	Cast iron Chromium; Titanium; Tantalum; Magnesium	May require pre-plating, or pre-tinning, with a solderable metal or will require the use of a specialized solder.

== Testing solderability ==
Both quantitative and qualitative tests for solderability exist. The two most common testing methods are the 'dip and look' method and wetting balance analysis. In both of these tests, the soldered pieces undergo an accelerated aging process before being tested for solderability, to take into consideration the time a component was in storage prior to mounting to final assembly. The dip and look method is a qualitative test. One form of it is specified as Mil-Std-883 Method 2003. On the other hand, the wetting balance analysis is a quantitative test that measures the wetting forces between molten solder and the test surface as a function of time.
