= Ott (name) =

Male given name and family name

Ott is a surname and an Estonian masculine given name (meaning "Bear" but also the Estonian version of the German name, Otto). People with the name include:

== Surname ==
=== A ===
- Alfredo Ott (born 1983), American basketball player
- Alice Sara Ott (born 1988), German-Japanese pianist
- Alvin Ott (born 1949), American politician
- Anastasiya Ott (born 1988), Russian hurdler
- Andrew Ott, American engineer
- Anneli Ott (born 1976), Estonian politician

=== B ===
- Billy Ott (1940–2015), American baseball player
- Bobby Ott (born 1962), American speedway rider
- Brad Ott (born 1969), American golfer

=== C ===
- Carlos Ott (born 1946), Uruguayan architect
- Charles A. Ott, Jr. (1920–2006), American military commander
- Christophe Ott (born 1983), French football goalkeeper

=== D ===
- David Ott (composer) (born 1947), American composer
- David N. Ott (1937–2020), American politician and lawyer

=== E ===
- Ed Ott (1951–2024), American baseball player
- Edward Ott (born 1941), American physicist and electrical engineer
- Ellis R. Ott (died 1981), American statistician and educator
- Elsie Ott (1913–2006), recipient of the Air Medal
- Eugen Ott (1889–1977), German diplomat
- Eugen Ott (1890–1966), German military commander

=== F ===
- Fred Ott (1860–1936), American, the first man to be filmed
- Friedrich Schmidt-Ott (1860–1956), German lawyer and politician

=== G ===
- Gottlieb Ott (1832–1882), Swiss building contractor

=== H ===
- Harry Ott (1933–2005), German diplomat
- Harry L. Ott, Jr. (born 1952), American politician
- Heinrich Ott (1894–1962), German physicist
- Heinrich Ott (fl. 1980s), Swiss bobsledder
- Henry Ott (1865–1949), American politician
- Horace Ott (born 1933), American songwriter and arranger
- Hubert Ott (born 1964), French politician
- Hugo Ott (1931–2022), German historian and academic

=== I ===
- Ingmar Ott (born 1955), Estonian botanist
- Isaac Ott (1847–1916), American physiologist

=== J ===
- Jeff Ott (born 1970), American punk rock musician
- Jim Ott (born 1947), American politician
- Jochen Ott (born 1974), German politician
- John Ott (1909–2000), American photographer
- Jonathan Ott (born 1949), American ethnobotanist and author
- Jürg Ott, Swiss geneticist

=== K ===
- Katharine Ott, American mathematician
- Kerstin Ott (born 1982), German singer, songwriter, guitarist and DJ
- Konrad Ott (born 1959), German philosopher

=== L ===
- Ludwig Ott (1906–1985), German theologian
- Ludwig Ott (water polo) (1937–2015), German water polo player

=== M ===
- Manuel Ott (born 1992), Filipino football player
- Margaret Saunders Ott (1920–2010), American pianist
- Mel Ott (1909–1958), American baseball player
- Mirjam Ott (born 1972), Swiss curler

=== N ===
- Niko Ott (born 1945), West German rower

=== P ===
- Patricia Ott (born 1960), German field hockey player
- Peter Ott (1738–1809), Austrian military commander

=== R ===
- Riki Ott (born 1964), American environmental activist
- Russell Ott, American politician

=== S ===
- Sharon Ott (fl. 20th century), American theatre director
- Stanley Joseph Ott (1927–1992), American clergyman
- Steve Ott (born 1982), Canadian hockey player (St. Louis Blues)

=== T ===
- Thomas Ott (born 1966), Swiss comic artist
- Thorsten Ott (born 1973), German football player
- Tyler Ott (born 1992), American football player

=== U ===
- Urmas Ott (1955–2008), Estonian journalist

=== W ===
- Wijnand Ott (born 1955), Dutch musician
- Wilhelm Ott (1886–1969), German politician
- Wilhelm Ott (fighter) (born 1982), Austrian fighter
- William Ott (1872–1951), New Zealand politician

== Given name ==
- Ott (born 1968), English record producer
- Ott Aardam (born 1980), Estonian actor
- Ott Arder (1950–2004), Estonian poet and writer
- Ott Jud (fl. 15th century), Jewish Austrian martial arts master
- Ott Kadarik (born 1976), Estonian architect
- Ott-Heinrich Keller (1906–1990), German mathematician
- Ott Valdeko Kurs (born 1939), Estonian geographer, ethnologist, turkologist and scholar of Finno-Ugric peoples
- Ott Lepland (born 1987), Estonian singer
- Ott Lumi (born 1978), Estonian politician
- Ott Reinumäe (born 1984), Estonian footballer
- Ott Sepp (born 1982), Estonian actor
- Ott Tänak (born 1987), Estonian rally driver
- G. Ott Romney (1892–1973), American basketball coach
- Paul Ott Carruth, American football player

== Fictional ==
- Vernon "Ott" Motley, elder African-American stevedore featured on HBO's The Wire. It is he who is set to take over as treasurer for the union at the end of the show's second season.

== See also ==
- Otepää - an Estonian town with a name meaning "Ott's Head" or "Bear's Head".
