= Otten =

Otten is a Dutch and Low German patronymic surname (son of Ot, Otte, Otto). It can refer to

- Andy Otten (born 1989), Australian rules footballer
- Don Otten (1921–1985), American basketball player
- Else Otten (1873–1931), Dutch translator
- Ernie Otten (born 1954), American politician from South Dakota
- Frans Otten (1895–1969), Dutch businessman, president of Philips from 1939 to 1961
  - Otten Cup, annual youth football tournament named after Frans Otten
- George H. Otten (1889–1978), American landscape architect
- Gerold Otten (born 1955), German politician
- Herman Otten (born 1966), American politician from South Dakota
- Jacob Otten Husly (1738–1796), Dutch architect
- Jim Otten (born 1951), American baseball player
- John Otten (1870–1905), American baseball player
- Jonny Otten (born 1961), German footballer
- Karl Otten (1889–1963), German expressionist writer and broadcaster
- Kate Otten (born 1964), South African architect
- Les Otten (born 1949), American businessman
- Louis Otten (1883–1946), Dutch footballer
- Mac Otten (1925–2015), American basketball player
- Marissa Otten (born 1989), Dutch racing cyclist
- Mark Otten (born 1985), Dutch footballer
- Matthew Otten (born 1981), American basketball player
- Max Otten (born 1992), Australian rules footballer
- Ryan Otten (born 1990), American football player
- Scott Otten (born 1994), Welsh rugby player
- Thomas Otten, French New Age singer
- Willem Jan Otten (born 1951), Dutch writer, playwright and poet

== See also ==
- Ottens
- Otte
- Otter (surname)
