= Tribocorrosion =

Material degradation due to corrosion and wear

Tribocorrosion is a material degradation process due to the combined effect of corrosion and wear. The name tribocorrosion expresses the underlying disciplines of tribology and corrosion. Tribology is concerned with the study of friction, lubrication and wear (its name comes from the Greek "tribo" meaning to rub) and corrosion is concerned with the chemical and electrochemical interactions between a material, normally a metal, and its environment. As a field of research tribocorrosion is relatively new, but tribocorrosion phenomena have been around ever since machines and installations are being used.

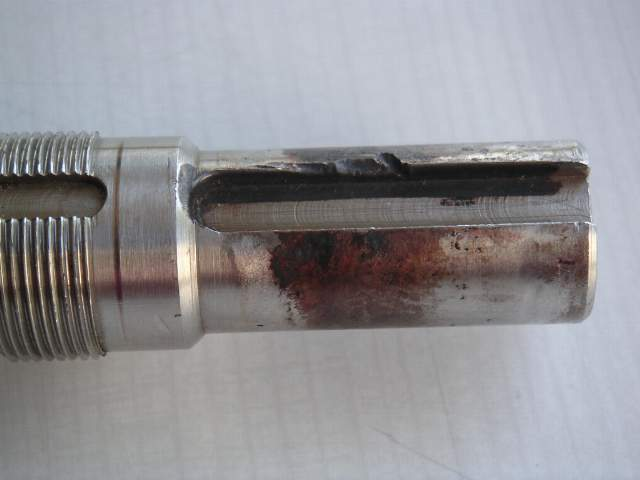
Tribocorrosion on stainless steel shaft

Wear is a mechanical material degradation process occurring on rubbing or impacting surfaces, while corrosion involves chemical or electrochemical reactions of the material. Corrosion may accelerate wear and wear may accelerate corrosion. Both these phenomena, as well as fretting corrosion (which results from small amplitude oscillations between contacting surfaces) fall into the broader category of tribocorrosion. Erosion-corrosion is another tribocorrosion phenomenon involving mechanical and chemical effects: impacting particles or fluids erode a solid surface by abrasion, chipping or fatigue while simultaneously the surface corrodes.

== Phenomena in different engineering fields ==
Tribocorrosion occurs in many engineering fields. It reduces the life-time of pipes, valves and pumps, of waste incinerators, of mining equipment or of medical implants, and it can affect the safety of nuclear reactors or of transport systems. On the other hand, tribocorrosion phenomena can also be applied to good use, for example in the chemical-mechanical planarization of wafers in the electronics industry or in metal grinding and cutting in presence of aqueous emulsions. Keeping this in mind, we may define tribocorrosion in a more general way independently of the notion of usefulness or damage or of the particular type of mechanical interaction: Tribocorrosion concerns the irreversible transformation of materials or of their function as a result of simultaneous mechanical and chemical/electrochemical interactions between surfaces in relative motion.

== Biotribocorrosion ==
Biotribocorrosion covers the science of surface transformations resulting from the interactions of mechanical loading and chemical/electrochemical reactions that occur between elements of a tribological system exposed to biological environments. It has been studied for artificial joint prostheses. It is important to understand material degradation processes for joint implants to achieve longer service life and better safety issues for such devices.

== Passive metals ==
While tribocorrosion phenomena may affect many materials, they are most critical for metals, especially the normally corrosion resistant so-called passive metals. The vast majority of corrosion resistant metals and alloys used in engineering (stainless steels, titanium, aluminium etc.) fall into this category. These metals are thermodynamically unstable in the presence of oxygen or water, and they derive their corrosion resistance from the presence at the surface of a thin oxide film, called the passive film, which acts as a protective barrier between the metal and its environment. Passive films are usually just a few atomic layers thick. Nevertheless, they can provide excellent corrosion protection because if damaged accidentally they spontaneously self-heal by metal oxidation.

However, when a metal surface is subjected to severe rubbing or to a stream of impacting particles the passive film damage can become continuous and extensive. The self-healing process may no longer be effective and in addition it requires a high rate of metal oxidation. In other words, the underlying metal will strongly corrode before the protective passive film is reformed, if at all. In such a case, the total material loss due to tribocorrosion will be much higher than the sum of wear and corrosion one would measure in experiments with the same metal where only wear or only corrosion takes place.

The example illustrates the fact that the rate of tribocorrosion is not simply the addition of the rate of wear and the rate of corrosion but it is strongly affected by synergistic and antagonistic effects between mechanical and chemical mechanisms. To study such effects in the laboratory, one most often uses mechanical wear testing rigs which are equipped with an electrochemical cell. This permits one to control independently the mechanical and chemical parameters. For example, by imposing a given potential to the rubbing metal one can simulate the oxidation potential of the environment and in addition, under certain conditions, the current flow is a measure of the instantaneous corrosion rate. Volume loss due to electrochemical dissolution can be measured by Faraday's laws of electrolysis and subtracted from total volume loss in tribocorrosion so the sum of mechanical wear loss and the synergies can be calculated. For a deeper understanding tribocorrosion experiments are supplemented by detailed microscopic and analytical studies of the contacting surfaces.

At high temperatures, the more rapid generation of oxide due to a combination of temperature and tribological action during sliding wear can generate potentially wear resistant oxide layers known as 'glazes'. Under such circumstances, tribocorrosion can be used potentially in a beneficial way.

== Erosion corrosion ==
Erosion corrosion is a degradation of material surface due to mechanical action, often by impinging liquid, abrasion by a slurry, particles suspended in fast flowing liquid or gas, bubbles or droplets, cavitation, etc. The mechanism can be described as follows:

- mechanical erosion of the material, or protective (or passive) oxide layer on its surface,
- enhanced corrosion of the material, if the corrosion rate of the material depends on the thickness of the oxide layer.

The mechanism of erosion corrosion, the materials affected by it, and the conditions when it occurs are generally different from that of flow-accelerated corrosion, although the latter is sometimes classified as a sub-type of erosion corrosion.
