= Otter (surname) =

Otter is a surname. Notable people with the surname include:

- Jonas Otter or Jean Otter, (1707-1748), Swedish-born French diplomat, traveller, and writer
- William Otter (1768-1840), first Principal of King's College London and Bishop of Chichester, England
- William Bruère Otter (1805-1876), Anglican clergyman and Archdeacon of Lewes
- Henry Charles Otter (1807-1876), Royal Navy Officer and hydrographic surveyor
- Francis Otter (1831–1895), English politician
- Fredrik Wilhelm von Otter (1833–1910), Swedish naval officer and politician; Prime Minister
- William Dillon Otter (1843-1929), soldier who was the first Canadian-born Chief of the General Staff of the Canadian Army
- Anthony Otter (1896-1986), sixth Bishop of Grantham, England
- Göran von Otter (1907–1988), Swedish diplomat
- Butch Otter (born 1942), American politician from Idaho
- Anne Sofie von Otter (born 1955), Swedish mezzo-soprano
