= Ot en Sien =

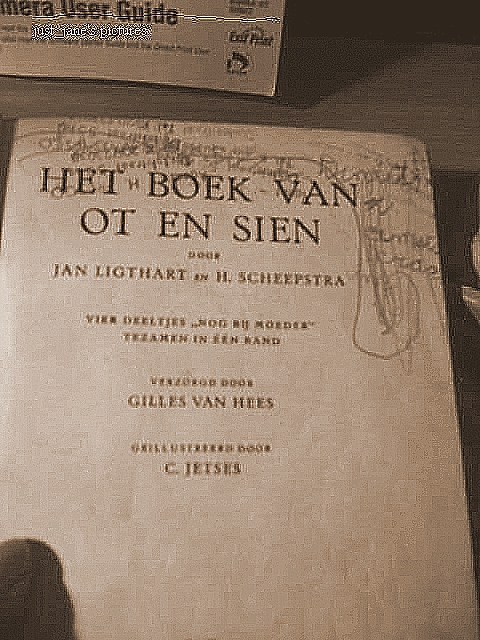
Title page of Het boek van Ot en Sien

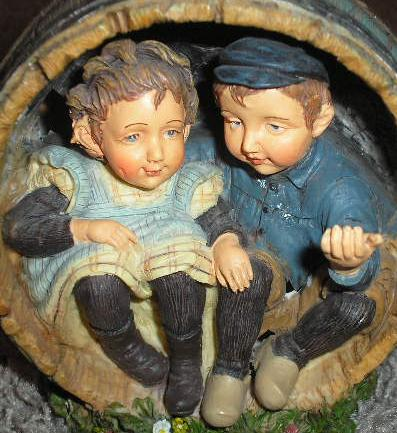
Statue of "Ot en Sien", after one of the stories in which they hide from the rain in a barrel.

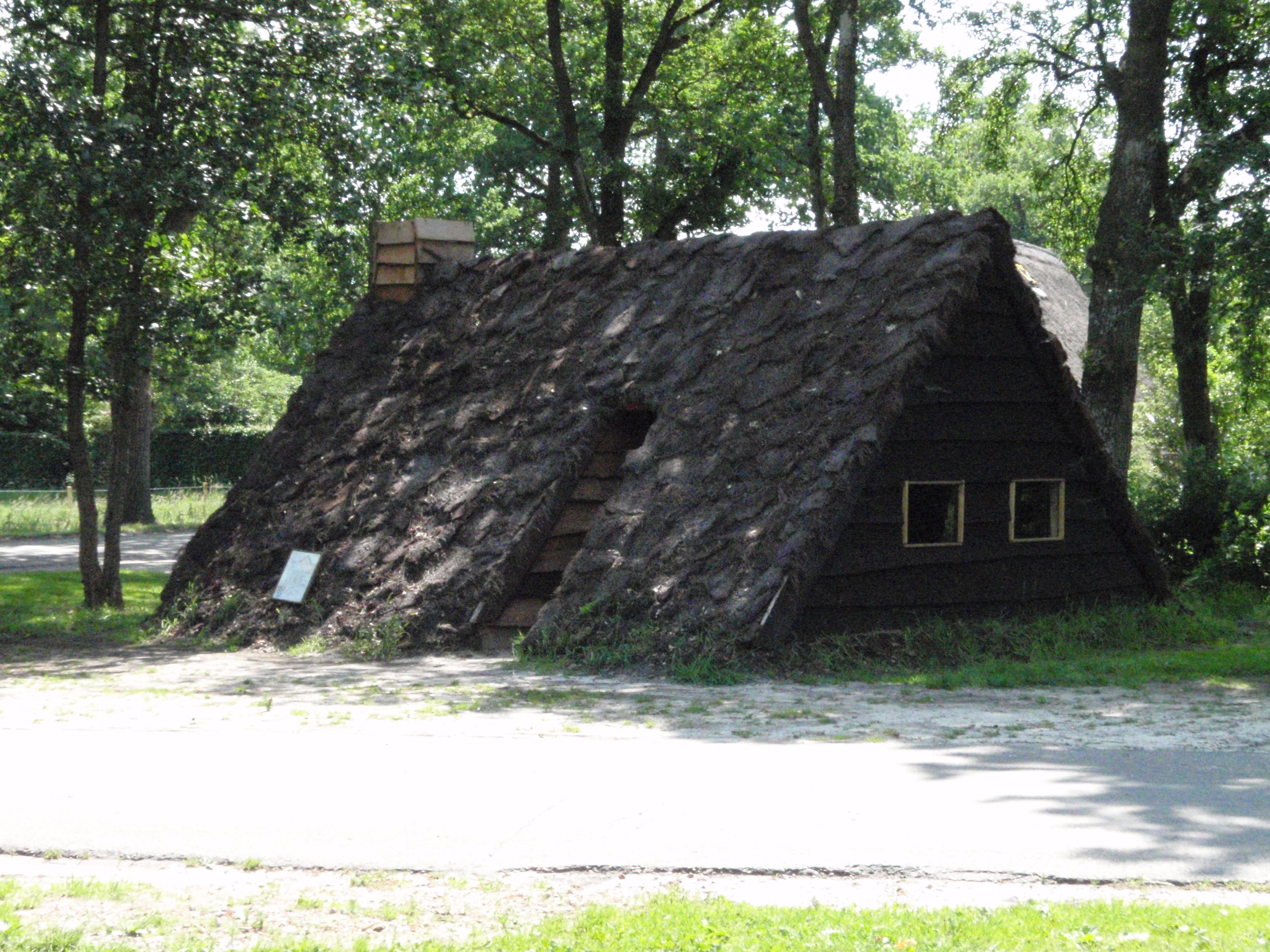
A peat and sod dwelling

Ot en Sien is a Dutch children's book series, written by Hindericus Scheepstra, a teacher in Drenthe, the Netherlands. It centers around two little children, a boy named Ot and a girl named Sien.

It was the start of a new method of writing children's books and had profound influence on Dutch elementary education in the first half of the twentieth century

== The authors ==
Ot and Sien are the main characters in a series of Dutch children's tales that were very popular in the first half of the twentieth century. The first series titled Dicht bij Huis ('Close to home'), appeared in 1902. The second series Nog bij Moeder ('Still with mother'), followed in 1904. The author of the stories was Hindericus Scheepstra. However, he acted on the inspiration of Jan Ligthart, who had the intention to expose young people to what he considered a healthy daily family life. The illustrations were made by Cornelis Jetses.

After WWII the stories of Ot and Sien gradually went out of fashion and they were often ridiculed for the unrealistic picture they gave of life in the province. A century after their appearance there is a revival in the interest for the publications and in 2004 an exposition was held, focusing mostly on the artwork by Jetses.

== The characters ==
Ot (short for Otto) and Sien (short for e.g. Francine) are two next door neighbors, a boy and a girl. Their illustrations were based on two children that actually lived in Jetses' neighborhood. The stories are situated in Drenthe that was at the time the most impoverished province of the Netherlands where quite a few people were still living in dwellings constructed of peat and sods. The surrounding poverty is nowhere to be seen in the stories that depict a very idealized version of reality.

== Ligthart's philosophy ==
What Ligthart intended was to give a description of the daily family interactions of the main characters as a means to set an idealized example "where from an early age Father and Mother relate to each other and to the children, where a civilized and wellwilling tone is dominant, where the parents give a living example of friendliness, adaptability and sacrifice on a daily basis, not only towards each other and the children, but also towards the servants and the guests"

== Influence on education ==
Ligthart's philosophy was followed by many teachers in elementary schools in the Netherlands and the "Ot en Sien" books became a ubiquitous teaching tool for reading in elementary schools. This phenomenon lasted until late in the 1950s and is one of the most remarkable developments in education in the country. Generations of children in the ever more urbanizing and suburbanizing society grew up with an idyllic and rather unrealistic view of what family life should be like and apparently was like in the country side of Drenthe. Few city kids ever experienced that and their parents certainly did not have a servant in the house. Knowing this, one is also aware that small-town life is usually less expensive. Still in the 1980s, Ot en Sien were very present in the lives of the children that grew up in Drenthe; their stories are a classic and loved both by young and old. They have left a strong impression on those who had the luck of having a simple and perhaps a somewhat naíve childhood, growing up in this province.

== Monuments ==
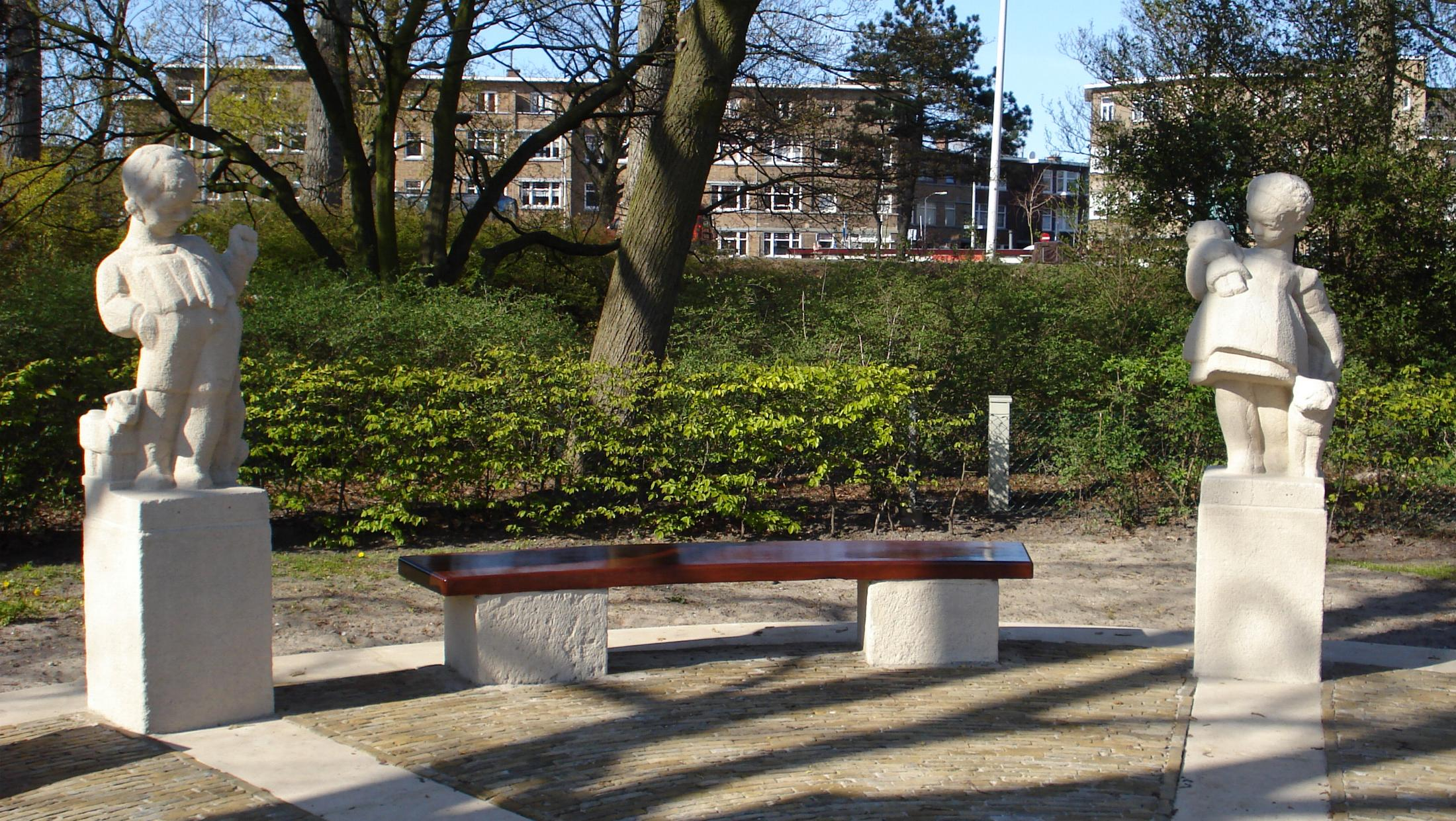
Ot en Sien by Frits van Hall, The Hague

In the Hague a statue of Ot and Sien was erected in 1930. The text was to read "In memory of Jan Ligthart" but his widow Marie Lion Cachet objected to this because she knew that her husband had not actually written the stories, although he had given his friend Scheepstra continuous advice. Scheepstra had the advantage that he was a Drenthe native and so could add a measure of local color to the stories. The inscription therefore was amended to "In memory of Jan Ligthart and H. Scheepstra". Later the town of Roden in Drenthe also dedicated a monument to Ot and Sien and their creators.

== Dutch expressions ==
- Als Ot en Sien, ('like Ot and Sien'): childishly simple.
- Uit de tijd van Ot en Sien, ('From the time of Ot and Sien'): from the good old days, from olden days.

== Literature ==
- Jan A. Niemeijer (1997) Kijk, Ot en Sien, een klassieker in de Nederlandse jeugdliteratuur. 2e druk Baarn, Uitgeverij Callenbach. ISBN 90-266-0672-9 (in Dutch)
