= Isaac Ott =

American physician and physiologist

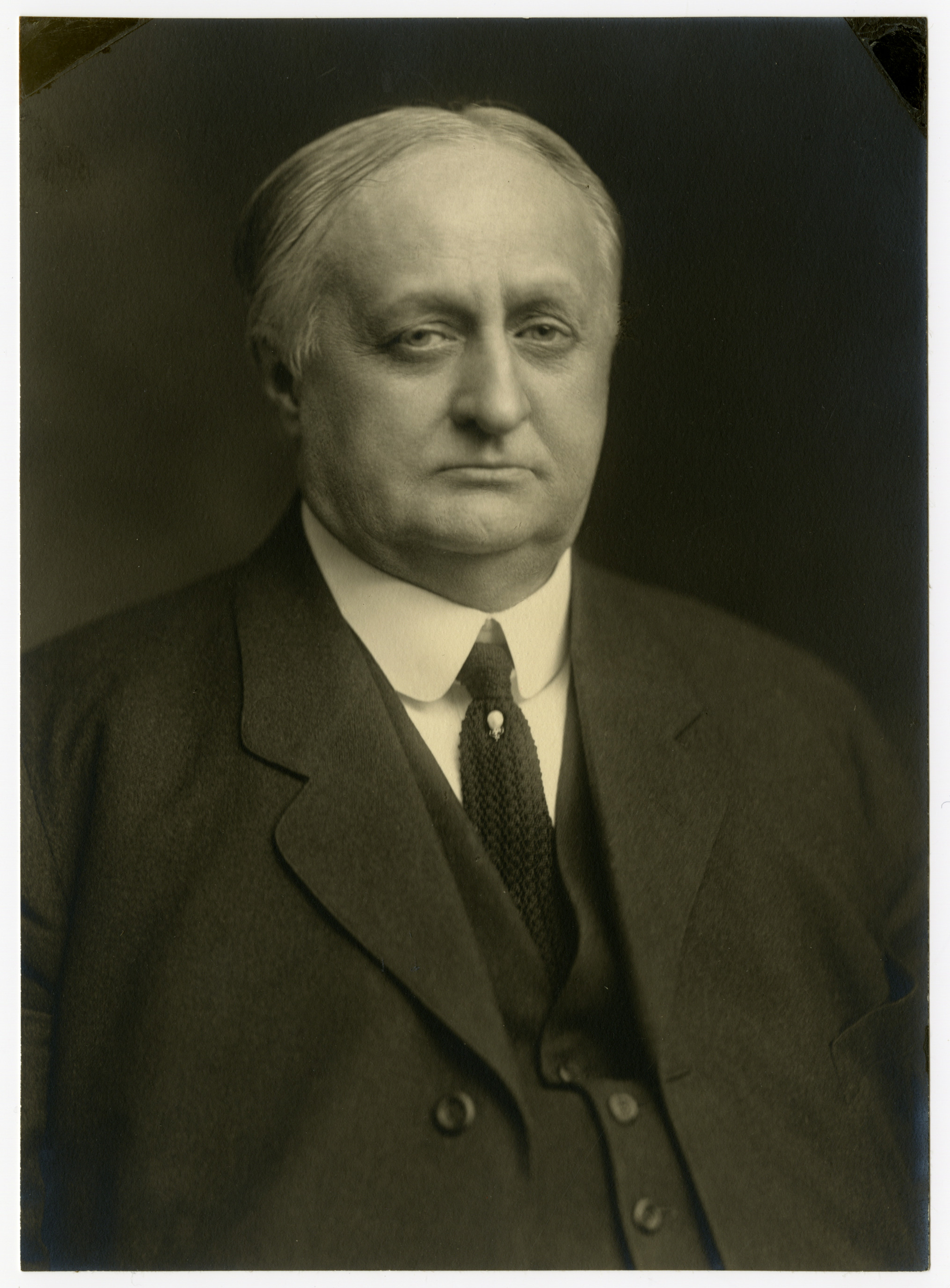
Portrait, c. 1910

Isaac Ott (30 November 1847 – 1 January 1916) was an American physician and a professor of physiology. A pioneer of experimental physiology in the United States, his influential Textbook of Physiology went into five editions during his lifetime. Ott conducted animal experiments and contributed to the understanding of the regulation of body temperature by the corpora striata in the brain, the role of fever, and the use of antipyretics in treatment.

== Life and work ==
Ott was born in Mt Bethel, Northampton County, Pennsylvania to Jacob and Sarah (Sally) Ann LaBarre and was schooled at Belvidere Academy, Hackettstown, New Jersey, before joining Lafayette College in 1865. He received a medical degree in 1869 from the University of Pennsylvania and began to practice at Easton while also conducting researches periodically in European universities including Leipzig, Berlin, Wurzburg, and with researchers in London including Edward_Klein. He became a demonstrator of physiology at the University of Pennsylvania in 1875 and in 1878 he went to Johns Hopkins University as a fellow in biology. He became a professor at the Medico-Chirugical College in Philadelphia in 1894 and continued there until his retirement. Apart from teaching which he took up with great enthusiasm, driving from his home in Easton to Philadelphia every day, he conducted research, publishing numerous papers apart from several influential monographs and textbooks on physiology. He also served as a neurologist at the Pennsylvania Asylum, Norristown.

Ott's researches included studies of the effects of drugs and hormones and studies on the regulation of body temperature. He examined the effects of alkaloids such as cocaine and atropine on the nervous system and the effects of the nervous system on body temperature. He identified the corpora striata as the region of the brain responsible for temperature regulation. He studied pituitary extracts and their effects using animal studies and made some early studies on what would later be identified as oxytocin.

Ott died from influenza complications including pneumonia at his home in Easton and was survived by his wife Katherine. His mother endowed a professorship in his memory at the University of Pennsylvania while another research professorship was instituted in his name.
