= Cold water pitting of copper tube =

Deterioration mechanism in water pipes

Cold water pitting of copper tube occurs in only a minority of installations. Copper water tubes are usually guaranteed by the manufacturer against manufacturing defects for a period of 50 years. The vast majority of copper systems far exceed this time period but a small minority may fail after a comparatively short time.

The majority of failures seen are the result of poor installation or operation of the water system. The most common failure seen in the last 20 years is pitting corrosion in cold water tubes, also known as Type 1 pitting. These failures are usually the result of poor commissioning practice although a significant number are initiated by flux left in the bore after assembly of soldered joints. Prior to about 1970 the most common cause of Type 1 pitting was carbon films left in the bore by the manufacturing process.

Research and manufacturing improvements in the 1960s virtually eliminated carbon as a cause of pitting with the introduction of a clause in the 1971 edition of BS 2871 requiring tube bores to be free of deleterious films. Despite this, carbon is still regularly blamed for tube failures without proper investigation.

== Copper water tubes ==
Copper tubes have been used to distribute potable water within building for many years and hundreds of miles are installed throughout Europe every year. The long life of copper when exposed to natural waters is a result of its thermodynamic stability, its high resistance to reacting with the environment, and the formation of insoluble corrosion products that insulate the metal from the environment. The corrosion rate of copper in most potable waters is less than 2.5 μm/year, at this rate a 15 mm tube with a wall thickness of 0.7 mm would last for about 280 years. In some soft waters the general corrosion rate may increase to 12.5 μm/year, but even at this rate it would take over 50 years to perforate the same tube. Despite the reliability of copper and copper alloys, in some cold hard waters pits may form in the bore of a tube. If these pits form, failure times can be expected between 6 months and 2 years from initiation. The mechanism that leads to the pitting of copper in cold hard waters is complex, it requires a water with a specific chemistry that is capable of supporting pit growth and a mechanism for the initiation of the pits.

== Pitting ==
The pits that penetrate the bore are usually covered in a hard pale green nodule of copper sulfate and copper hydroxide salts. If the nodule is removed a hemispherical pit is revealed filled with coarse crystals of red cuprous oxide and green cuprous chloride. The pits are often referred to as Type 1 pits and the form of attack as Type 1 pitting.

== Water ==
The characteristics capable of supporting Type 1 pits were determined empirically by Lucey after examining the compositions of waters in which the pitting behaviour was known. They should be cold, less than 30 °C, hard or moderately hard, 170 to 300 mg/L carbonate hardness, and organically pure. Organically pure waters usually originate from deep wells, or boreholes. Surface waters from rivers or lakes contain naturally occurring organic compounds that inhibit the formation of Type 1 pits, unless a deflocculation treatment has been carried out that removes organic material. Type 1 pitting is relatively uncommon in North America and this may be a result of the lower population density allowing a significant proportion of the potable water to be obtained from surface derived sources. In addition to being cold hard and organically pure, the water needs a specific chemistry. The effect of the water chemistry can be empirically determined though use of the Pitting Propensity Rating (PPR) a number that takes into account the sulfate, chloride, nitrate and sodium ion concentrations of the water as well as its acidity or pH. A water with a positive PPR has been shown to be capable of propagating Type 1 pits.

== Initiation ==
Many waters in both the UK and Europe are capable of supporting Type 1 pitting but no problems will be experienced unless a pit is initiated in the wall of the tube. When a copper tube is initially filled with a hard water salts deposit on the wall and the copper slowly reacts with the water producing a thin protective layer of mixed corrosion products and hardness scale. If any pitting of the tube is to occur then this film must be locally disrupted. Three mechanisms allow the disruption of the protective deposits. The most well known, although now the least common, is the presence of carbon films on the bore. Stagnation and flux residues are the most common initiation mechanisms that have led to Type 1 pitting failures in the last ten years.

=== Carbon films ===
Copper tubes are made from the large billets of copper that are gradually worked and drawn down to the required size. As the tubes are drawn they are heat treated to produce the correct mechanical properties. The organic oils and greases used to lubricate the tubes during the drawing processes are broken down during the heat treatment and gradually coat the tube with a film of carbon. If the carbon is left in the bore of the tube then it disrupts the formation of the protective scale and allows the initiation of pits in the wall. The presence of deleterious films, such as carbon, has been prohibited by the British Standards in copper tubes since 1969. All copper tubes for water service are treated, usually by sand (or other nonferrous medium) blasting or acid pickling, to remove any films produced during manufacture with the result that Type 1 pitting initiated by carbon films is now rare.

=== Stagnation ===
If water is left to stand in a tube for an extended period, the chemical characteristics of the water change as the mixed scale and corrosion products are deposited. In addition any loose scale that is not well adhered to the wall will not be flushed away and air dissolved in the water will form bubbles, producing air pockets. These processes can lead to a number of problems mainly on horizontal tube runs. Particles of scale that do not adhere to the walls and are not washed away tend to fall into the bottom of the tube producing a coarse porous deposit. Air pockets that develop in horizontal runs disrupt the formation of protective scales in two areas: the water lines at the sides, and the air space at the top of the tube.

In each of the areas that the scale has been disrupted, Type 1 pitting can be initiated. Then, even after the tube has been put back into service, the pit will continue to develop until the wall has perforated. This form of attack is often associated with the commissioning of a system. Once a system has been commissioned it should be either put immediately into service or drained down and dried by flushing with compressed air otherwise pitting may initiate. If either of these options is not possible then the system should be flushed through regularly until it is put into use.

=== Flux ===
In plumbing systems fluxes are used to keep the mating surfaces clean during soldering operations. The fluxes often consist of corrosive chemicals such as ammonium chloride and zinc chloride in a binder such as petroleum jelly. If too much is applied to the joint, then the excess flux will melt and run down the bore of a vertical tube or pool in the bottom of a horizontal tube. Where the bore of the tube is covered in a layer of flux it may be locally protected from corrosion but at the edges of the flux pits often initiate. If the tube is put into service in a water that supports Type 1 pitting then these pits will develop and eventually perforate the sides of the tube.

== Good working practice ==
In most cases Type 1 pitting can be avoided by good working practices. Always use tubes that have been manufactured to BS EN 1057. Tubes greater than 10 mm in diameter made to this standard will always be marked the number of the standard, the nominal size, wall thickness and temper of the tube, the manufacturer's identification mark and the date of production at least every 600 mm. Tubes less than 10 mm in diameter will be similarly marked at each end.

Once a system has been commissioned it should be either put immediately into service or drained down and dried. If either of these options is not possible then the system should be flushed though regularly until it is put into use. It should not be left to stand for more than a week. At present stagnation is the most common cause of Type 1 pitting.

Flux should be used sparingly. A small quantity should be painted over the areas to be joined and any excess removed after the joint has been made. Some fluxes are marked as water-soluble but under some circumstances they are not removed before pitting has initiated.

== See also ==
- Erosion corrosion of copper water tubes
