= Flow-accelerated corrosion =

Flow-accelerated corrosion (FAC), also known as flow-assisted corrosion, is a corrosion mechanism in which a normally protective oxide layer on a metal surface dissolves in a fast flowing water. The underlying metal corrodes to re-create the oxide, and thus the metal loss continues.

By definition, the rate of FAC depends on the flow velocity. FAC often affects carbon steel piping carrying ultra-pure, deoxygenated water or wet steam. Stainless steel does not suffer from FAC. FAC of carbon steel halts in the presence of small amount of oxygen dissolved in water. FAC rates rapidly decrease with increasing water pH.

FAC has to be distinguished from erosion corrosion because the fundamental mechanisms for the two corrosion modes are different. FAC does not involve impingement of particles, bubbles, or cavitation which cause the mechanical (often crater-like) wear on the surface. By contrast to mechanical erosion, FAC involves dissolution of normally poorly soluble oxide by combined electrochemical, water chemistry and mass-transfer phenomena. Nevertheless, the terms FAC and erosion are sometimes used interchangeably because the actual mechanism may, in some cases, be unclear.

FAC was the cause of several high-profile accidents in power plants, for example, a rupture of a high-pressure condensate line in Virginia Power's Surry nuclear plant in 1986, that resulted in four fatalities and four injuries.

== See also ==
- Erosion Corrosion of Copper Water Tubes
- Oxygenated treatment
