= Oxygenated treatment =

Oxygenated treatment (OT) is a technique used to reduce corrosion in a boiler and its associated feedwater system in flow-through boilers.

== Process ==
With oxygenated treatment, oxygen is injected into the feedwater to keep the oxygen level between 30 and 50 ppb. OT programs are most commonly used in supercritical (i.e. >3250psi) power boilers. The ability to change an existing sub-critical boiler over to an OT program is very limited. "Common injection points are just after the condensate polisher and again at the deaerator outlet." This forms a thicker protective layer of hematite (Fe_{2}O_{3}) on top of the magnetite. This is a denser, flatter film (vs. the undulation scale with OT) so that there is less resistance to water flow compared to AVT. Also, OT reduces the risk of flow-accelerated corrosion.

When OT is used, conductivity after cation exchange (CACE) at the economiser inlet must be maintained below 0.15μS/cm this can be achieved by the use of a full-flow condensate polisher.

== Comparison of AVT to OT ==
Characteristic	All-Volatile Treatment (Reducing)	All-Volatile Treatment (Oxidizing)	Oxygenated Treatment (Neutral Water Treatment)	Oxygenated Treatment (Combined Water Treatment)
Feedwater system piping	ferrus or mixed metallurgy (e.g. copper feedwater train)	all-ferrous metallurgy	all-ferrous metallurgy	all-ferrous metallurgy
Dissolved oxygen level	< 10 ppb	1 to 10 ppb	30-50 ppb (drum), 30-150 (supercritical)	30-50 ppb (drum), 30-150 (supercritical)
Chemicals added	a reducing agent (such as hydrazine), ammonia to raise pH	ammonia to raise pH	an oxidizing agent (such as hydrogen peroxide or oxygen)	an oxidizing agent, ammonia to raise pH
pH	9.0-9.3	9.2-9.6	9.2-9.6	8.0-8.5 (once-through), 9.0-9.4 (drum)
Top layer composition	magnetite (Fe_{3}O_{4}) on steel piping, cuprous oxide (Cu_{2}O) on copper piping	hematite (Fe_{2}O_{3}) forms on top of the porous magnetite (Fe_{3}O_{4})	ferric oxide hydrate (FeOOH) or hematite (Fe_{2}O_{3}) forms over the porous magnetite	ferric oxide hydrate (FeOOH) or hematite (Fe_{2}O_{3}) forms over the porous magnetite
Advantages	Can be used with mixed metallurgy piping	More protection against FAC than AVT(R), minimizes orifice fouling	Less flow resistance, lower dissolved feedwater iron concentrations, FeOOH film is more stable, reduced boiler cleaning frequency	-
Disadvantages	Increased risk of FAC, a deaerator is required, more frequent chemical cleaning is required, hazardous chemicals (hydrazine) are used.	A deaerator is required.	Air leakage is more serious. Two-phase FAC can be a concern.	Condensate polishers are required.

== See also ==
- Heat recovery steam generator
- Flow-accelerated corrosion
- Oxygen scavenger
