= November 1924 =

Month of 1924

<<	November 1924					>>
Su	Mo	Tu	We	Th	Fr	Sa
						1
2	3	4	5	6	7	8
9	10	11	12	13	14	15
16	17	18	19	20	21	22
23	24	25	26	27	28	29
30

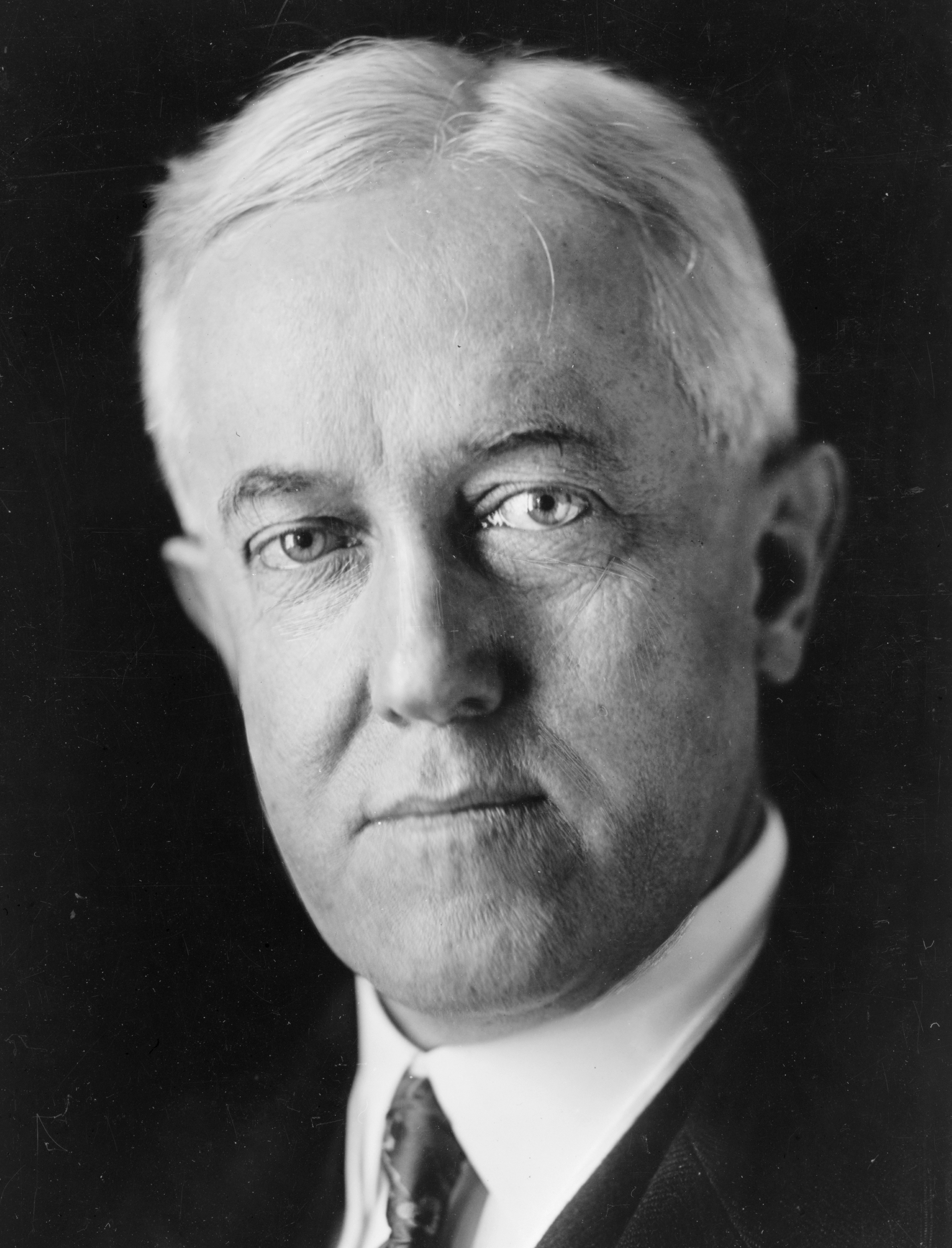
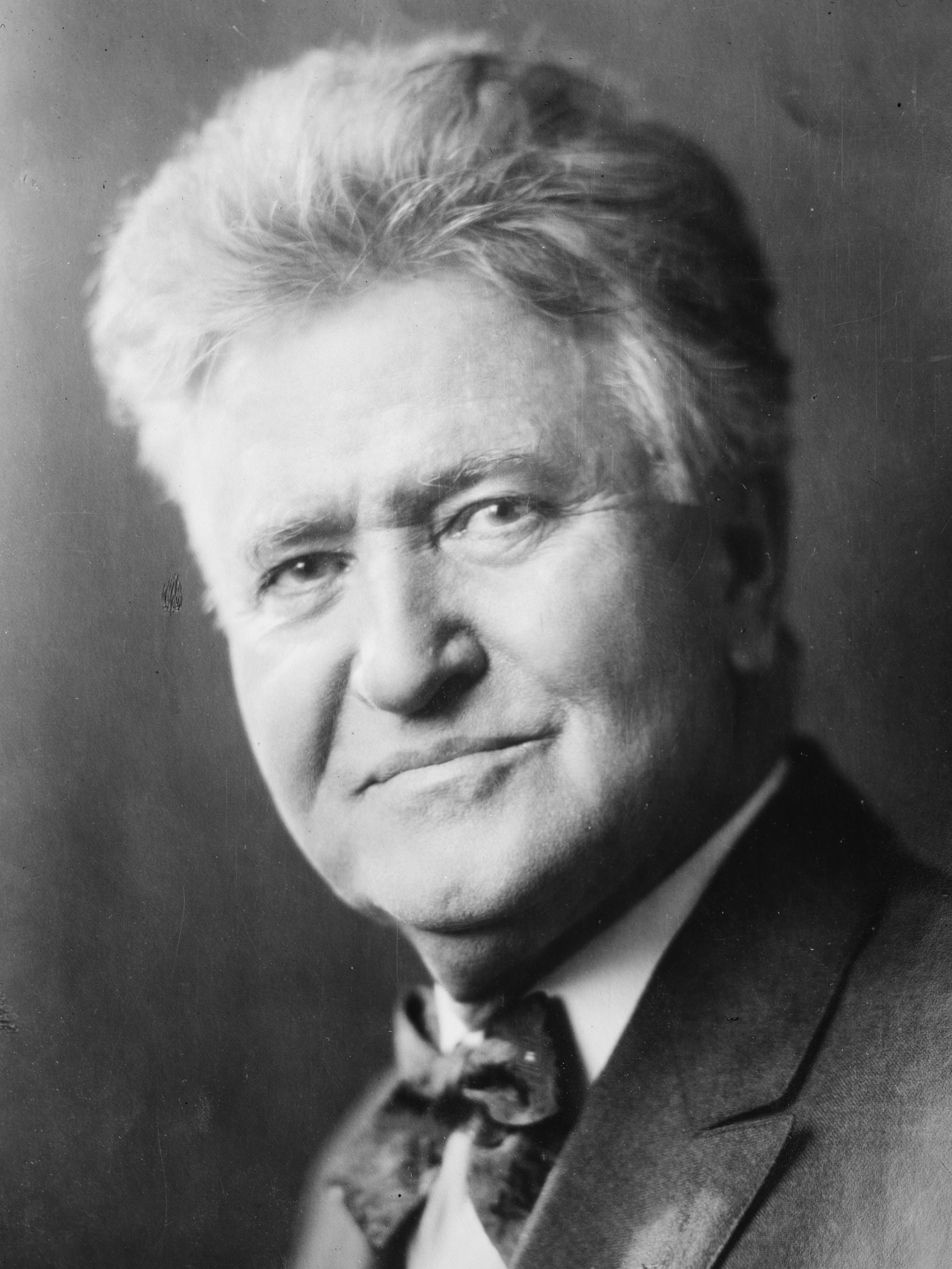
November 4, 1924: U.S. President Calvin Coolidge defeats challengers John W. Davis and Robert M. La Follette in a landslide victory

The following events occurred in November 1924:

== November 1, 1924 (Saturday) ==
- Gerardo Machado was elected president of Cuba under the Liberal-Popular Coalition banner, defeating former president Mario García Menocal. The coalition also won 31 of the 53 seats in the Cuban House of Representatives and 11 of the 12 seats in the Senate.
- Sultan bin Saqr Al Qasimi II invaded the Emirate of Sharjah and led the overthrow of its ruler, Khalid bin Ahmad Al Qasimi, who had been the emir since 1914. Sharjah was one of the Trucial States under British protectorate status at the time and is now one of the United Arab Emirates.
- Britain's Royal Air Force introduced its Meteorological Flight service to take regular readings of the weather.
- Irish independence activist Éamon de Valera was sentenced to a month in prison for entering Ulster, in Northern Ireland, illegally.
- Club Sport Colombia was founded in Paraguay.
- Born:
  - Süleyman Demirel, President of Turkey 1993 to 2000; Prime Minister of Turkey five times between 1965 and 1993; in İslamköy (d. 2015)
  - Morteza Ahmadi, Iranian actor; in Tehran (d. 2014)
- Died:
  - Bill Tilghman, 70, American lawman and gunfighter, was shot and killed in Cromwell, Oklahoma, while trying to disarm a drunken U.S. prohibition agent, Wiley Lynn.
  - John Hopkin Ashley, 36, American outlaw and bank robber, was killed in an ambush in Roseland, Florida by Palm Beach County Sheriff George B. Baker. After attempting to shoot Baker, Ashley and three of his partners were killed in a shootout.

== November 2, 1924 (Sunday) ==
- Huang Fu was named as the acting president of the Republic of China following the Beijing Coup, at the request of General Feng Yuxiang. President Huang declared the presidency of Cao Kun to be illegal.
- Ten passengers on a street car in Chicago were killed and 31 others injured when a freight train hit a street car after midnight at the crossing of the Chicago, Milwaukee St. Paul Railroad at the intersection of North Avenue and Kingsbury Street. Witnesses said that the freight locomotive had no lights on as it reached the crossing.
- The first newspaper crossword in the United Kingdom was published as a feature of the Sunday Express.
- Uruguay and Argentina played to a scoreless draw in the South American Championship of soccer football. Uruguay finished in first place with a record of 2-1-0 (for 5 points) compared to Argentina's 1-2-0 (for 4 points), to win Uruguay's fifth Copa América.
- Born:
  - Father David Bauer, Canadian ice hockey player and coach as well as a Roman Catholic priest, founder of the Canada men's national ice hockey team in 1964, and inductee to the Hockey Hall of Fame; in Waterloo, Ontario (d. 1988)
  - Earl J. Chronister Jr., American sport shooter who held the world record for 20 years for accuracy at 1,000 yards; in Dallastown, Pennsylvania (d. 2009)

== November 3, 1924 (Monday) ==
- In the UK, a railway accident killed 15 British commuters who were riding the Liverpool express train.
- In the U.S., a railroad accident killed 11 bus passengers and seriously injured 8 others near Hampton, Virginia, when Chesapeake & Ohio passenger train No. 46 struck the bus in which they were riding.
- In China, General Feng Yuxiang's troops entered Tianjin.
- Calvin Coolidge and John W. Davis made their final appeals to voters with radio addresses on the eve of the presidential election.
- The League of Nations opened its first session of the International Opium Conference, addressing the issue of opium smoking and addiction.
- Born:
  - Ralph Lazo, American rights activist who was the only non-Japanese American to voluntarily relocate to a Japanese American internment camp during World War II; in Los Angeles (d. 1992)
  - Slobodan Novak, Croatian Yugoslavian novelist; in Split (d. 2016)

== November 4, 1924 (Tuesday) ==
- Calvin Coolidge of the Republican Party was elected to a second term in the U.S. presidential election, as Democratic opponent John W. Davis nearly swept the South but was unable to carry any other states. Third-party candidate Robert M. La Follette won his home state of Wisconsin and its 13 electoral votes, while Coolidge had 382 electoral votes and Davis had 136. Davis, formerly the U.S. ambassador to the United Kingdom, won less than 29% of the popular vote, the lowest share by the Democratic Party nominee in any U.S. presidential election.
- Stanley Baldwin returned to office as the prime minister of the United Kingdom after forming a Conservative Party government, following the October 29 election.
- A mutiny of eight Brazilian Navy officers and 260 sailors took place on the Brazilian battleship São Paulo. The mutineers took control of the ship and attempted unsuccessfully to incite rebellion among officers on other ships, then fired a shell at the warship Minas Geraes and sailed out of the Rio de Janeiro harbor. After a brief exchange of fire with the batteries at Fortaleza de Santa Cruz da Barra and Fort Copacabana, the São Paulo rebels arrived at Uruguay on November 10, where they were granted asylum. The Minas Geraes escorted the São Paulo back to Rio de Janeiro, where it arrived on November 21.
- Richard Strauss's autobiographical opera Intermezzo was given its first performance, premiering in Dresden at the Semperoper opera house.
- French sawmill foreman Joseph Marie Guillaume Seznec was convicted of murder after an eight day trial, following the mysterious disappearance of salesman Pierre Quéméneur, despite no evidence that Quéméneur had been killed. Seznec would be imprisoned for more than 20 years at the Devil's Island prison off of the coast of South America before being released in 1947. The case would be reopened in 2006, more than 50 years after Seznec was killed in a pedestrian accident, but the conviction would be upheld.
- Fighting broke out between Italian veterans of World War One and members of the Fascist Party's Blackshirts during a march to the Piazza Venezia to commemorate the anniversary of the Italian Armistice.
- Died: Gabriel Fauré, 79, French composer

== November 5, 1924 (Wednesday) ==
- Former Chinese emperor Puyi, who had received a measure of luxury as part of the 1912 Articles of Favourable Treatment of the Great Qing Emperor after His Abdication, was expelled from the Forbidden City by orders of General Feng Yuxiang, who unilaterally revoked the Articles. Puyi was given the status of a private citizen of the Republic of China and his imperial title and privileges were revoked. General Feng permanently abolished the eunuch system throughout China as part of his reforms.

== November 6, 1924 (Thursday) ==
- Nikola Pašić became Prime Minister of Yugoslavia for the second time.
- Winston Churchill was named as the British chancellor of the exchequer, a surprising move on the part of Stanley Baldwin, as Churchill had no experience in finance.
- The A. A. Milne poetry collection When We Were Very Young was published.
- The Irish Boundary Commission held its first meeting to come to an agreement of the dividing line between the Irish Free State and the United Kingdom of Great Britain and Northern Ireland, with an initial gathering in London at 6 Clement's Inn. The commission was composed of Richard Feetham for the British government, Eoin MacNeill for the Irish Free State and Joseph R. Fisher for Northern Ireland.
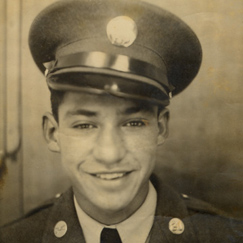
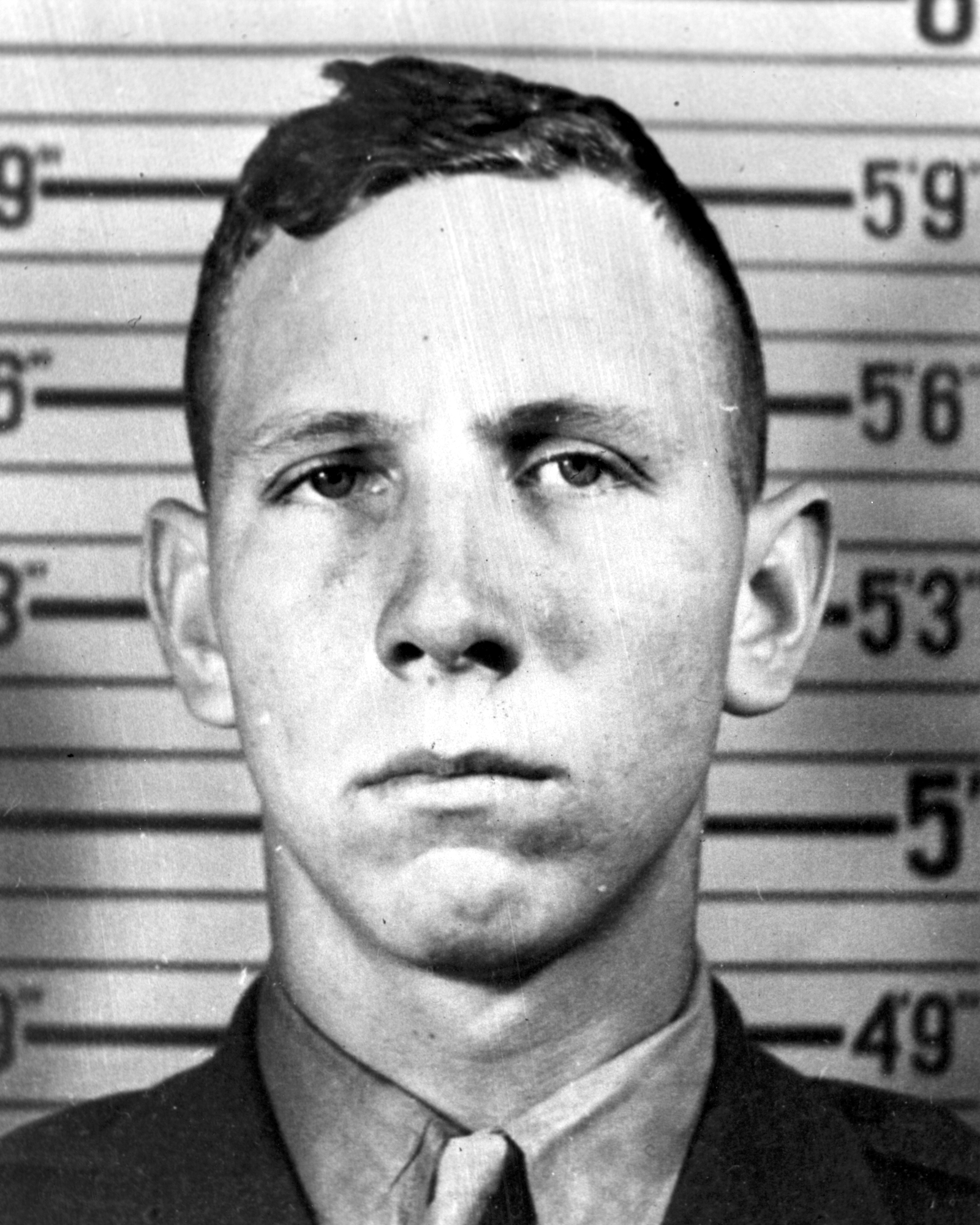
U.S. Army Master Sergeant Pena (1924-1950) and USMC Corporal Block (1924-1945)
- Born:
  - U.S. Army Master Sergeant Mike C. Pena, Korean War hero awarded the Medal of Honor more than 63 years after his death; in Corpus Christi, Texas (killed in action at the Battle of Tabu-dong, 1950)
  - Corporal Harlon Block, U.S. Marine who was one of the flag raisers at the Battle of Iwo Jima; in Yorktown, Texas (killed in action at Iwo Jima, 1945)
  - Baroness Lips von Lipstrill (stage name for Rudolf Schmid, later Jeanette Schmid), Czechoslovak-born American transgender entertainer known for her whistling abilities, outfits and risque comedy; in Volary, Czechoslovakia (d. 2005)

== November 7, 1924 (Friday) ==
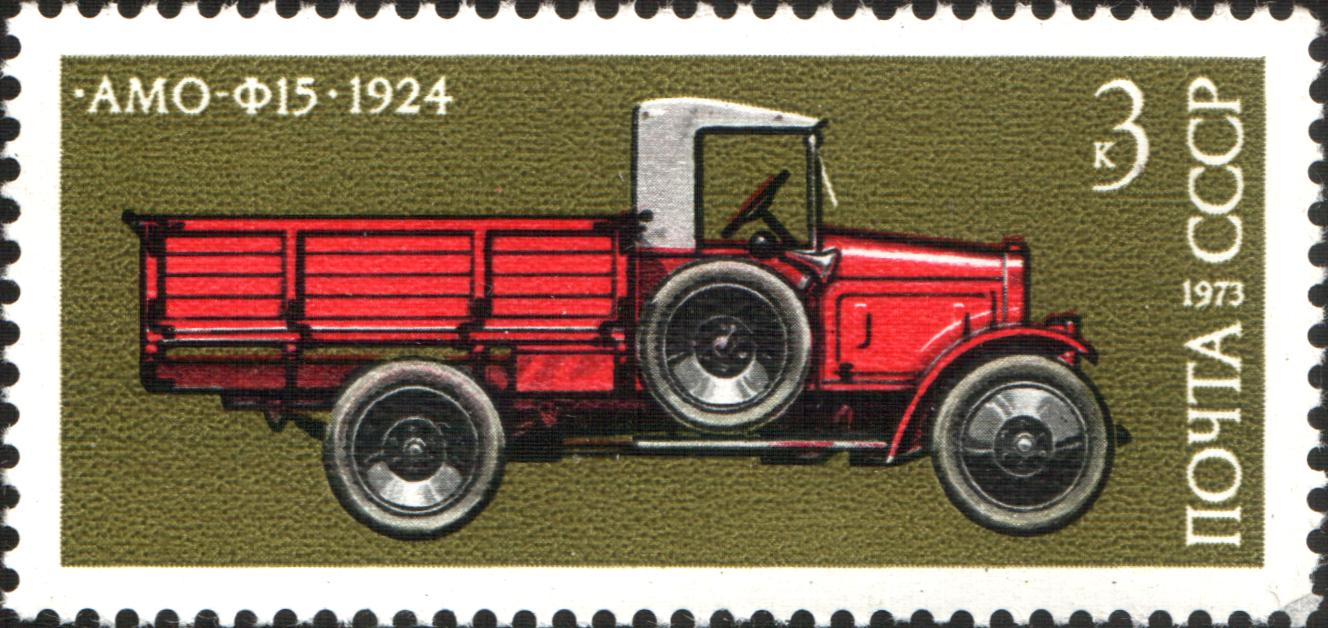
The AMO-F15, the first Soviet vehicle, on a 3-kopeck commemorative stamp in 1973)

- The Soviet Union displayed its first manufactured motor vehicle, the AMO-F-15 truck (modeled from the Italian Fiat 15Ter), after the truck came off the assembly line of the new AMO (Avtomobilnoe Moskovskoe Obshchestvo) assembly plant at Tyufeleva south of Moscow on November 1.
- Germany announced its first balanced budget since the end of World War One.
- Austria's Prime Minister Ignaz Seipel resigned along with his cabinet of ministers.
- The Alvarado Hot Springs geothermal pool was discovered in Los Angeles County, California on the ranch of William P. Alvarado near Puente Hills. Alvarado had been drilling for natural gas when the operation reached a depth of 3,400 feet (1,000 m). The spa would remain operational for at least 35 years.
- The first commercial radio station in Australia, 2BE, began regular broadcasting from Sydney on a frequency of 870 AM.
- Boško Boškovič, Governor of Lower Kolašin in Yugoslavia's Montenegro republic, was assassinated while traveling from Mojkovac to Šahovići, and local authorities arrested 31 men from Šahovići.

== November 8, 1924 (Saturday) ==
- In Honolulu, Hawaii, Korean nationalist Syngman Rhee announced plans for a new independence movement to obtain Korea's independence from the Japanese Empire.

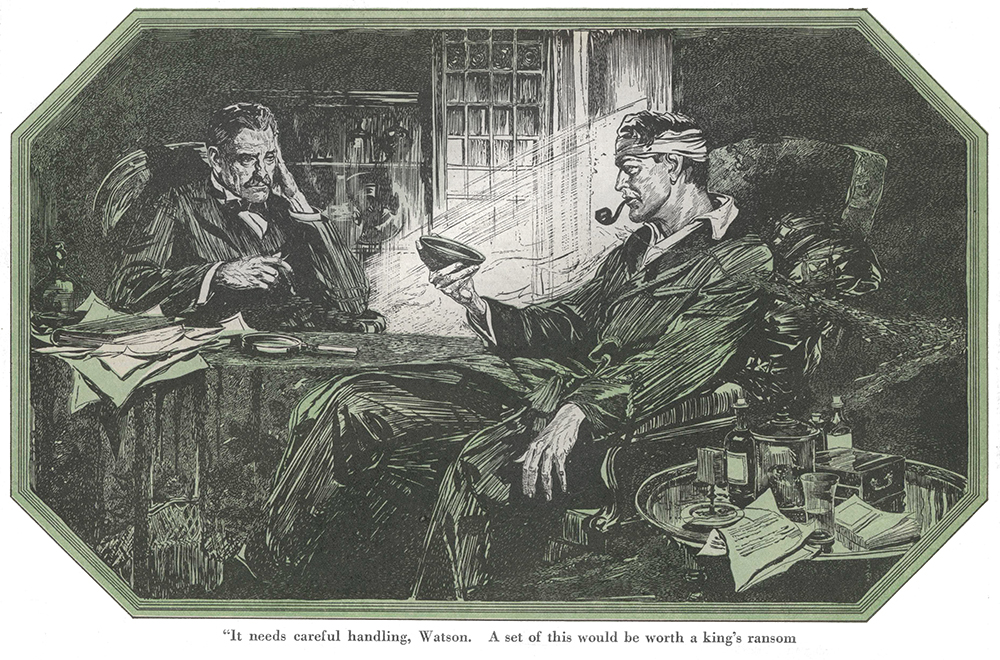
Dr. Watson and Sherlock Holmes in "The Adventure of the Illustrious Client"

- The Sherlock Holmes short story "The Adventure of the Illustrious Client" by Sir Arthur Conan Doyle was published for the first time in Collier's Weekly in the United States.
- Born:
  - Johnny Bower, Canadian ice hockey goaltender and inductee into the Hockey Hall of Fame; in Prince Albert, Saskatchewan (d. 2017)
  - Munawar Sultana, popular Indian film actress; in Lahore, Punjab Province, British India (now in Pakistan) (d. 2007)
  - Rudolf Nassauer, German novelist; in Frankfurt (d. 1996)
  - Robert V. Hogg, American statistician and textbook writer; in Hannibal, Missouri (d. 2014)
- Died: Mike Merlo, 44, Sicilian-born American mobster with the "Chicago Outfit" or "South Side Gang" of Johnny Torrio and Al Capone, as well as a political figure within Chicago's Democratic Party political machine, died of cancer.

== November 9, 1924 (Sunday) ==
- The Šahovići massacre of hundreds of Yugoslav Muslims in the Montenegro villages of Šahovići and Pavino Polje began after an estimated 2,000 Orthodox Christian men from the municipalities of Kolašin and Bijelo Polje assembled following the burial of Boško Bošković. Over the next two days, from 120 (from a Yugoslav government investigation at the time) to 600 to 1,000 Muslims were killed.
- Soviet troops massed intimidatingly on the border with Estonia on the eve of the opening of the trial of the 149.
- The Giro di Lombardia bicycle race in Italy was won by Giovanni Brunero of the Legnano team, who covered the 250-kilometre (160 mi) course in 8 hours and 23 minutes.
- The silent drama film He Who Gets Slapped, starring Lon Chaney, was released.
- Born: Robert Frank, Swiss photographer; in Zürich (d. 2019)
- Died: Henry Cabot Lodge, 74, U.S. senator and historian

== November 10, 1924 (Monday) ==
- The Tientsin Conference opened in China between warlords Zhang Zuolin, Feng Yuxiang, and Lu Yongxiang, at the invitation of former president Sun Yat-sen, to discuss ending the civil war between the rival factions. The men gathered at the home of former premier Duan Qirui, whom Zhang Zuolin named as head of state of China on November 24.
- Ranch property belonging to Mexican president-elect Plutarco Elías Calles was expropriated by the state in accordance with agrarian laws.
- Born:
  - David Sencer, American public health official and director of the Center for Disease Control (CDC) from 1966 to 1977; in Grand Rapids, Michigan (d. 2011)
  - Russell Johnson, American TV actor best known for portraying "the Professor" on Gilligan's Island; in Ashley, Pennsylvania (d. 2014)
- Died:
  - Dean O'Banion, 32, American mobster and leader of Chicago's North Side Gang, was murdered in his florist shop, Schofield's Flowers, which he used as a front for his organized criminal operations.
  - Lola Rodríguez de Tió, 81, Puerto Rico-born Cuban poet and women's rights activist

== November 11, 1924 (Tuesday) ==
- The Martin Beck Theatre (now the Al Hirschfeld Theatre) opened in New York City.
- Born: Evelyn Wawryshyn, Canadian born baseball player in the AAGPBL, inductee to the Canadian Baseball Hall of Fame; in Tyndall, Manitoba (d. 2022)

== November 12, 1924 (Wednesday) ==
- A new session of the Italian parliament opened without 185 opposition members who had stayed away in a protest against the Fascist Party. The "Aventine Secession" allowed the Fascists to enact the restrictive program of Prime Minister Benito Mussolini.
- Died: Yevgenia Shakhovskaya-Glebova-Streshneva, 83, Russian philanthropist and children's activist

== November 13, 1924 (Thursday) ==
- The Polish Orthodox Church was created as an autocephalous religious denomination by the signing of the Patriarchal and Synodal Tomos by Patriarch Gregory VII of Constantinople, with the official proclamation taking effect on September 17, 1925.
- Italy's prime minister Benito Mussolini introduced a bill allowing women to vote in national elections in Italy.
- Born:
  - Motoo Kimura, Japanese biologist and theoretical population geneticist known for his introduction, in 1968, of the neutral theory of molecular evolution; in Okazaki, Aichi prefecture (d. 1994)
  - Edward F. Welch, Jr., U.S. Navy admiral; in Barrington, Rhode Island (d. 2008)

== November 14, 1924 (Friday) ==
- In New York City, explorers Roald Amundsen and Lincoln Ellsworth announced plans for a joint polar flight expedition in 1925.
- Born:
  - Rikidōzan (ring name for Mitsuhiro Momota), Korean-born Japanese sumo and professional wrestler, credited with bringing pro wrestling to Japan, posthumously inducted to the WWE Hall of Fame; as Kim Sin-rak in Hongwon, Japanese Korea (killed in street fight, 1963)
  - Parappurath (pen name for Kizhakkepainummoodu Easo Mathai), Indian novelist and screenplay writer; in Mavelikkara, Travancore kingdom, British India (now in the Kerala state) (d. 1981)
  - Julian Roosevelt, American banker and 1952 Olympic gold medalist in yachting; in Manhattan, New York City (d. 1986)
  - Dong Leshan, Chinese author and translator known for rendering numerous English-language publications into the Chinese language for reading in the People's Republic of China; in Ningbo, Zhejiang province (d. 1999)
- Died:
  - Jaan Tomp, 30, Estonian Communist and member of parliament who was the sole defendant to be executed for high treason following the "Trial of the 149".
  - Joe Quest, 71, American baseball player who played 1871 to 1886, and who was said to have coined the term "Charley horse" to describe a sudden leg cramp or sprain.

== November 15, 1924 (Saturday) ==
- France clashed with the United States over a letter from reparations agent Seymour Parker Gilbert stating that Britain and France were not entitled to collect a tax of 26 percent on German imports as part of reparations payments under the Dawes Plan. France contended that the import tax had nothing to do with the Plan.
- The United Kingdom angered Japan at the International Opium Conference in Geneva when British delegate Malcolm Delevingne said that Great Britain could not habitually recognize import certificates, because they were often diverted on the way to the country of purchase for illicit purposes by high officials in one far eastern country that he "preferred not to name."
- Nine members of the St. Louis-based "Egan's Rats" gang of bank robbers were convicted of robbery of a mail truck and each sentenced to 25 years incarceration in a federal prison. Over five years between 1919 and 1924, Egan's Rats, founded by Willie Egan and later led by Dint Colbeck, stole almost $4.5 million worth in cash and property, including the heist of $2.4 million from an armored mail truck on April 2, 1923. The convictions ended the organization, which had employed over 300 people over 35 years.
- Died:
  - Artur de Sacadura Cabral, 43, Portuguese aviator known for making (in 1922) the first aerial crossing of the South Atlantic Ocean, disappeared while he and copilot José Correia were flying over the English Channel.
  - Daisuke Nanba, 25, Japanese Communist convicted of attempting to assassinate Crown Prince Hirohito, was hanged at Ichigaya Prison two days after a ruling by the Supreme Court of Japan that he was guilty of high treason.

== November 16, 1924 (Sunday) ==
- Occupation of the Ruhr: French troops evacuated the right bank of the Rhine between Cologne and Koblenz.
- In British Malaya, Sir Charles Brooke, the English-born Rajah of Sarawak, oversaw a peacekeeping ceremony between the Iban, Kayan, Kenyah and Kajang peoples at Kapit Fort.
- Grand Duke Nicholas Nikolaevich, grandson of Tsar Nicholas I and leader of the anti-Soviet campaign to restore the Tsarist monarchy to Russia, assumed command of the Russian All-Military Union.
- The Soviet Union national football team played its first international soccer football match, defeating the Turkey national team, 3 to 0, at Moscow.
- The first radio broadcast in Ukraine took place from a station in Kharkiv.
- Born:
  - Mel Patton, U.S. track and field sprinter and 1948 Olympic gold medalist, known for setting the world record of 9.2 seconds in the 100 yard dash in 1948 and breaking the record of Jesse Owens in the 220 yard dash in 1949; in Los Angeles (d. 2014)
  - Sam Farber, American industrial designer who co-founded the OXO line of plastic-coated kitchen utensils; in New York City (d. 2013)

== November 17, 1924 (Monday) ==
- Slightly more than a year after the founding of the Republic of Turkey on October 29, 1923, as a nation with one political party, five CHP members of the Grand National Assembly (Ali Fuat (Cebesoy) Pasha, Kâzım Karabekir, Refet (Bele) Pasha, Rauf (Orbay) Bey and Adnan (Adıvar) Bey) founded a rival organization, the Progressive Republican Party (Teraḳḳîperver Cumhûriyet Fırḳası or TCF.
- The Canadian province of Ontario said that it would build a "dry navy" to cooperate with American Prohibition enforcement agents unless the Canadian federal government did more to stop rum-running.
- Police in Seattle, Washington arrested bootlegger Roy Olmstead and his wife Elise after obtaining evidence from wiretapping of telephone conversations. Their conviction would be appealed to the U.S. Supreme Court and become the basis (along with two other cases) for the Court's 1928 decision in Olmstead v. United States. This found, by a 4 to 3 decision, that wiretapping did not constitute a violation of the prohibition against an unreasonable search or seizure under the Fourth Amendment to the U.S. Constitution, a precedent that would stand for 39 years until being overturned in the 1967 case of Katz v. United States.
- The film A Sainted Devil, starring Rudolph Valentino, was released.
- Born: Claire Kelly Schultz, American computer scientist and historian; in Etters, Pennsylvania (d. 2015)

== November 18, 1924 (Tuesday) ==
- Britain asked the League of Nations for an indefinite postponement of any further discussion on the Geneva Protocol.
- Died: Ephraim Ruebush, 89, American book publisher and founder of the hymnal publishing Ruebush-Kieffer Company

== November 19, 1924 (Wednesday) ==
- Major-General Sir Lee Stack, British governor-general of the Anglo-Egyptian Sudan and Sirdar of the Egyptian Army, was shot in Cairo by a gang of Egyptian nationalist students, dying the following day.
- Hollywood producer Thomas H. Ince died at his estate in California, two days after leaving a gathering attended by many celebrities aboard William Randolph Hearst's private yacht, the Oneida. The cause of death was officially given as a heart attack, but wild rumors circulated that he had been shot or somehow otherwise fatally afflicted under circumstances that were covered up. A 2001 film, The Cat's Meow, is based on the rumors.
- The legislature of the Philippines passed a resolution calling for complete independence from the United States.
- Born:
  - Mutesa II of Buganda, the first president of Uganda from 1963 to 1966, and monarch (Kabaka) of the Kingdom of Buganda within the British colony of Uganda from 1939 until his death; as the son of King Daudi Cwa II in Makindye, Kampala (d. 1969). Knighted as Sir Edward Frederick Mutesa, he was referred to by the Western press as "King Freddie".
  - William Russell, British television actor; in Sunderland, Tyne and Wear (d. 2024)
  - J. D. Sumner, American gospel music singer, songwriter and music promoter; in Lakeland, Florida (d. 1998)
  - Margaret Turner-Warwick, British physician and thoracic specialist, and the first woman president of Britain's Royal College of Physicians; in London as Margaret Elizabeth Moore. (d. 2017)
- Died: Michael Logue, 84, Irish Roman Catholic Cardinal, Archbishop of Armagh and Primate of All Ireland since 1887

== November 20, 1924 (Thursday) ==
- Rudolf Ramek formed a government as the new chancellor of Austria, succeeding Ignaz Seipel. Ramek would yield the post back to Seipel on October 20, 1926.
- The Gandy Bridge, across Tampa Bay in the U.S. state of Florida, opened to drivers between Tampa and St. Petersburg, Florida. At a length of 2.5 miles (4.0 km), the structure was the longest bridge in the world at the time of its opening. Drivers who paid the 75-cent toll (equivalent to $13.50 in 2024) could drive between Tampa and St. Petersburg in 19 miles (31 km) rather than the 43 miles (69 km) on roads around the bay.
- The American Association of State Highway Officials (AASHO), acting on a suggestion from Minnesota state maintenance engineer A.H. Hinkle, approved a resolution recommending that the states of the United States agree to a consistent system of numbered interstate highways.
- Born:
  - Benoit Mandelbrot, Polish mathematician; in Warsaw (d. 2010)
  - Mark Miller, American actor; in Houston, Texas (d. 2022)
- Died: Sir Lee Stack, 56, British governor-general of Sudan, died the day after being shot by assassins.

== November 21, 1924 (Friday) ==
- Britain's new prime minister Stanley Baldwin and his Conservative Party government scrapped the commercial treaties that Ramsay MacDonald's Labour government had negotiated with the Soviet Union, after the controversy from the Zinoviev letter. The British intelligence agency MI5 soon determined that the letter had been a forgery, information that Baldwin's government chose not to make public, in order to protect the Conservative Party's reputation and the myth that the Labour Party had been tricked by the Soviet Union.
- King Vajiravudh of Siam (now Thailand) amended the kingdom's Palace Law of Succession, providing that he could name his successor or remove the heir apparent from succession. The change cleared the way for King Vajiravudh to name his younger brother, Prajadhipok, as his heir rather than his daughter, Bejaratana.
- U.S. Navy aviator Dixie Kiefer became the first pilot to take off from a warship at night, when he flew his Vought UO-1 from the deck of the USS California (BB-44).
- Born:
  - Shashi Bhushan, Indian independence activist; in Lashkar, Gwalior State, British India (now in Madhya Pradesh (d. 2011)
  - Warren Hacker, American baseball player; in Marissa, Illinois (d. 2002)
  - Donald R. Morris, U.S. Navy officer, CIA officer, historian and novelist; in New York City (d. 2002)
- Died: Florence Harding, 64, former First Lady of the United States and widow of U.S. president Warren G. Harding

== November 22, 1924 (Saturday) ==
- Fethi Okyar formed a new government as Prime Minister of Turkey upon the resignation of İsmet İnönü.
- The British government sent a message to Egyptian prime minister Saad Zaghloul demanding complete satisfaction in the matter of the assassination of Governor-General Sir Lee Stack, including punishment of those responsible and a payment of £500,000 in compensation. Britain blamed the assassination on the Egyptian government's failure to take steps to suppress anti-British agitation.
- Born:
  - Geraldine Page, American film, television and stage actress, winner of the 1985 Academy Award for Best Actress (for The Trip to Bountiful), as well as a BAFTA award, two Emmy Awards and two Golden Globe Awards; in Kirksville, Missouri (d. 1987)
  - Robert M. Young, American film and television director; in New York City (d. 2024)

== November 23, 1924 (Sunday) ==
- Edwin Hubble announced his discovery that Andromeda, previously believed to be a nebula, is actually another galaxy, and that the Milky Way is only one of many such galaxies in the universe. Hubble's discovery was disclosed by him to The New York Times. Hubble's paper was published on December 30 after peer review and presented by him at a meeting of the American Astronomical Society on January 1.
- Radio broadcasting began in the Soviet Union as "All-Union Radio" (Vsesoyuznoye Radio) went on the air at a station operated by the Communist International (Comintern) in Moscow, with transmission from the Shukhov Tower.
- American lawyer and fugitive Leo Koretz was arrested in Canada after being identified by a label sewn into his suit jacket, which he had brought to a tailor for repairs. Koretz, who had fled from the U.S. to Halifax, Nova Scotia, after being sought for assisting Charles Ponzi in defrauding investors, had been living in Halifax under the alias "Lou Keyte". Koretz died in prison less than two months after his arrest.
- Embattled Italian leader Benito Mussolini apologized for the events in Rome on November 4 and promised to take steps to keep his Blackshirts under control.
- Born:
  - Anita Linda (stage name for Alice Bueñaflor Lake), Philippine film actress and leading lady; in Pasay (d. 2020)
  - Paula Raymond (stage name for Paula Ramona Wright), American film and television actress known for the 1950 film noir Crisis; in San Francisco (d. 2003)
  - Lewis Yablonsky, American sociologist known for his studies of gang members, drug addicts and hippies; in Irvington, New Jersey (d. 2014)

== November 24, 1924 (Monday) ==
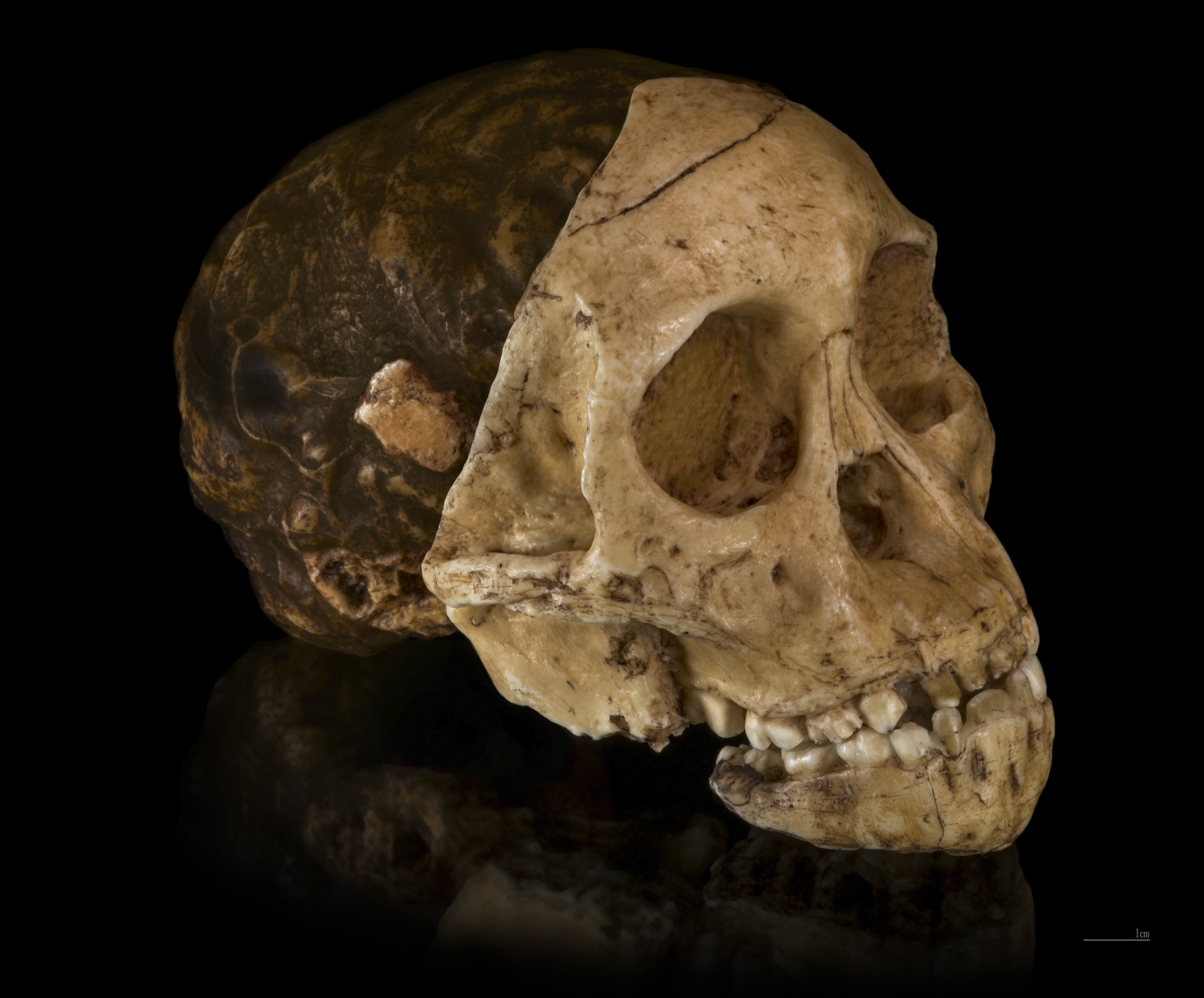
The cast of the Taung child, displayed at the University of Witwatersrand

- The fossilized remains of the "Taung child", the first individual of the extinct species Australopithecus africanus, were found by Australian anatomist and anthropologist Raymond Dart in a box of fossils sent to him by a shotfirer who had saved them from a limestone quarry at Taung in South Africa. Carbon dating indicated that the Taung child had lived 2.8 million years earlier. Dart concluded from scratches and puncture marks that the child had been killed by a bird of prey.
- Duan Qirui (Tuan Ch'i-jui) was installed by General Feng Yuxiang as the acting president of the Republic of China, replacing Huang Fu.
- The "Righteous Government", an alliance of eight organizations seeking to gain the independence of Korea from Japanese rule, was formed at a meeting in Seoul.
- Saad Zaghloul was ousted as Egyptian prime minister days after the assassination Sir Lee Stack, Governor-general of Sudan. Zaghloul was succeeded by Ahmad Ziwar Pasha.
- Born: Joanne Winter, American baseball pitcher for the Racine Belles of the AAGPBL, and the league's all-time career leader in innings pitched (2159) and pitching appearances (287); in Chicago (d. 1996)
- Died:
  - Donald Swanson, 76, Chief Inspector of London's Metropolitan Police during the attempt to identify and arrest the perpetrator of the "Jack the Ripper" murders in 1888
  - General Fernando Tamagnini de Abreu e Silva, 68, commander of the Portuguese Expeditionary Corps during World War One
  - Dr. John Beard, 66, Scottish embryologist known for his disproved theory that cancer could be treated successfully by use of pancreatic enzymes, died from a stroke.
  - Charles S. Fairchild, 82, U.S. Secretary of the Treasury from 1887 to 1889 during the administration of Grover Cleveland

== November 25, 1924 (Tuesday) ==
- Charlie Chaplin married his second wife, Lita Grey, in Empalme, Mexico.
- Radio stations in the United States broadcast an "hour of silence" between 10 and 11 p.m., setting it aside for international broadcasting tests. Listeners as far west as Duluth, Minnesota reported being able to hear broadcasting from England, France and Spain.

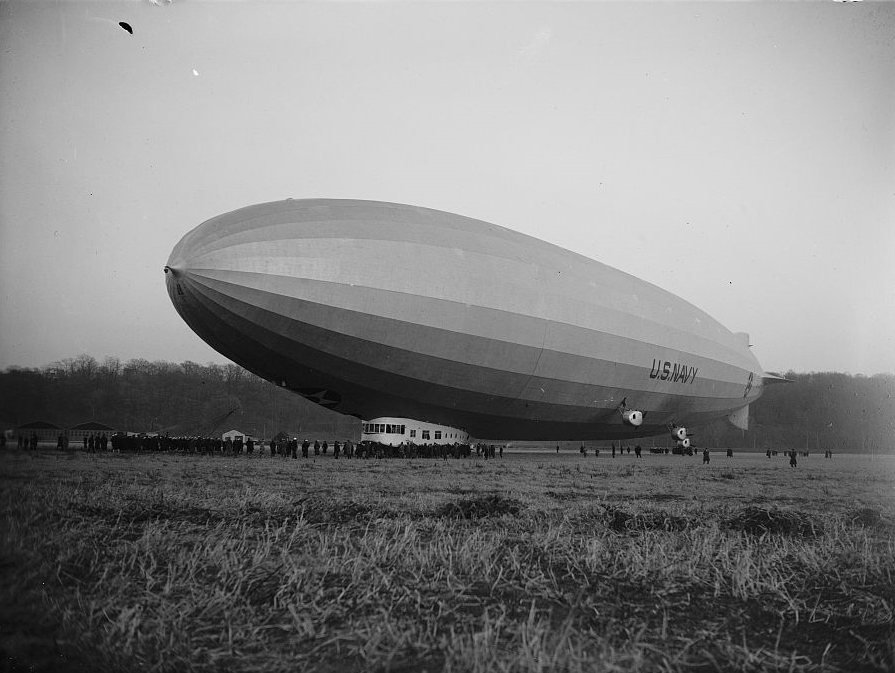
Christening of USS Los Angeles at Bolling Field

- The U.S. Navy dirigible USS Los Angeles (ZR-3) was commissioned, with Lieutenant Commander Maurice R. Pierce leading its crew. The airship was based at Naval Support Facility Anacostia within the District of Columbia. Among the changes made by the U.S. Navy after the airship was received from Germany was to replace the hydrogen gas with helium as a lifting agent.
- Noël Coward's play The Vortex premiered in London at the Everyman Theatre at Hampstead. Playwright Coward included himself in the initial cast in the role of Nicky Lancaster.
- Born: Takaaki Yoshimoto, Japanese poet, critic and philosopher; in Tokyo (d. 2012)
- Died: Jules Worms, 91, French painter

== November 26, 1924 (Wednesday) ==
- The Mongolian People's Republic was proclaimed as a Communist nation by the Mongolian People's Party. Peljidiin Genden, Chairman of the Presidium, was approved by the parliament as the head of state of the People's Republic. The republic's constitution specifically abolished the monarchy, whose last representative, Bogd Khan, had died on May 20. Between the death of the monarch and the proclamation of the Mongolian People's Republic, Navaandorjiin Jadambaa had served as the head of state.
- The World Child Welfare Charter was approved by the League of Nations General Assembly, becoming the first human rights document approved by an inter-governmental institution.

== November 27, 1924 (Thursday) ==
- The first Macy's Thanksgiving Day Parade was held in New York City by the R. H. Macy & Co. department store, initially as the "Macy's Christmas Parade".
- The verdicts in the trial of the 149 were read in Estonia after a 17-day trial, with convictions of high treason for representatives of labor organizations who had been arrested at "The Workers' Cellar" club on January 21, and who were accused of founding the anti-government "Workers' United Front" (Töörahva Ühine Väerind). Seven people were acquitted and all the others were sentenced to varying terms of either prison or forced labour. Of the group, 39 people were sentenced to life imprisonment, including Hendrik Allik, Vladimir Kangur, Paul Keerdo, August Hansen, Joosep Saat, Olga Künnapuu, Oskar Sepre, Arnold Veimer and Georg Abels. The surviving defendants would be pardoned in 1938 by Estonia's president Konstantin Päts.
- The Bear Mountain Bridge, with a main span of 1,631 feet (497 m), at the time the longest suspension bridge in the world, opened in the U.S. state of New York.
- In Wales, five coal miners were killed at the Killan Colliery at Swansea when an inrush of water flooded the underground mine. Eight other miners trapped by the flood were able to survive by finding an air pocket.
- Gustav Mahler's Symphony No. 10, was given its first performance, premiering in Amsterdam more than 13 years after Mahler had died without completely finishing his composition. Following full elaboration and orchestration of the draft, the completed version was conducted by Willem Mengelberg.
- The Cleveland Bulldogs, with a record of 6 wins, 1 loss and 1 tie (6-1-1), defeated the (5-6-0) Milwaukee Badgers, 53 to 0 in a game at Canton, Ohio, guaranteeing their first place finish in the National Football League (with a record of 7-1-1) and the NFL Championship Although the Chicago Bears (who had lost to Cleveland, 16-14, on October 5) increased their record to 5-1-4 with a 21-0 win over the Chicago Cardinals, they had only one scheduled game left and could finish no better than 6-1-4 and were mathematically eliminated.
- Born: James C. Niederman, American epidemiologist whose 1968 research identified the Epstein–Barr virus as the cause of infectious mononucleosis; in Hamilton, Ohio (d. 2024)
- Died: Stefan Toshev, 64, Bulgarian Army General and leader of the Bulgarian 3rd Army during World War One

== November 28, 1924 (Friday) ==
- The Fascist Party newspaper Il Popolo d'Italia warned that civil war would break out in Italy unless the opposition ceased its "campaign of defamation" against the Fascists.
- The Polish opera Legenda Bałtyku ("The Legend of the Baltic"), by Feliks Nowowiejski, was given its first performance, premiering in Poznań.
- Four men were killed when the former Royal Navy battleship HMS Marlborough, almost 70 years old, capsized off of the English coast at Selsey, West Sussex, while being towed to Osea Island for breaking up.
- The first "fax" sent across the ocean was transmitted from New York City to London as Richard H. Ranger's "wireless photogram" device transmitted a photograph of U.S. president Calvin Coolidge.
- Born:
  - Dennis Brutus, white South African rights activist known for successfully getting apartheid-era South Africa banned from the Olympic Games in 1964; in Salisbury, Southern Rhodesia (now Harare, Zimbabwe) (d. 2009)
  - Lou Everett, American test pilot for the X-13 Vertijet, the VZ-3 Vertiplane, the XV-8 Fleep and the XV-5 Vertifan; in Brooklyn, New York City (killed in test flight, 1965)

== November 29, 1924 (Saturday) ==
- The Little Khural, the five member collective head of state of the Mongolian People's Republic, held its first meeting, and selected Peljidiin Genden as its chairman.
- Tokyo Broadcasting Station, one of three radio stations that would join forces to create the Japanese radio and television network NHK in 1926, was founded by former Tokyo Mayor Gotō Shinpei. The station began broadcasting four months later, on March 22, 1925. On August 6, 1926, Tokyo Broadcasting merged with stations in Osaka and Nagoya to form Nippon Hōsō Kyōka.
- The Office international du vin (OIV) was formed in Paris by an agreement of eight wine-producing nations (Italy, Greece, Spain, Portugal, France, Hungary, Luxembourg and Tunisia).
- The Army–Navy Game was won by Army, 12-0, in Baltimore. U.S. president Calvin Coolidge was among the 80,000 in attendance.
- In the 12th Grey Cup of Canadian football, Queen's University beat the Toronto Balmy Beach Beachers 11-3 at Varsity Stadium.
- The Montreal Forum opened in Canada as the Montreal Canadiens, defeated the Toronto St. Pats, 7 to 1. The new arena also served as the home of the Montreal Maroons, who would play their first game at the Forum on December 3.
- Born:
  - Domingo Liotta, Argentine heart surgeon and inventor known for creating the Left Ventricular Assist Device (LVAD), the first artificial heart device; in Diamante (d. 2022)
  - Irv Noren, American baseball player and pro basketball player; in Jamestown, New York (d. 2019)

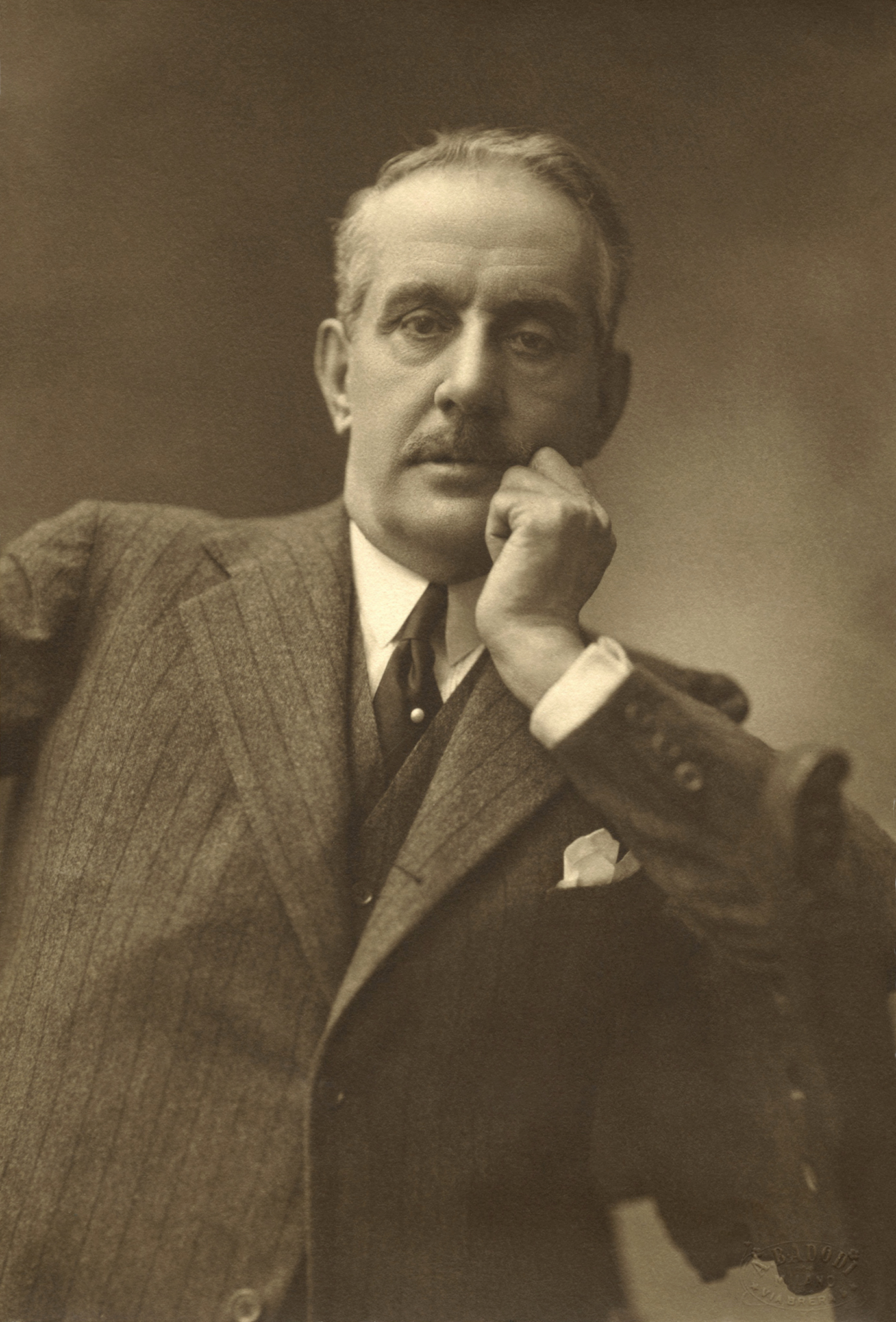
Puccini

- Died: Giacomo Puccini, 66, Italian opera composer known for La bohème (1896) and Tosca (1900), died in Brussels of complications from surgery for cancer.

== November 30, 1924 (Sunday) ==
- The 1924 NFL season officially ended with the Cleveland Bulldogs as champions based on having the best record (7-1-1) for an .875 winning percentage. Second place went to the Chicago Bears (6-1-4 or .857), whom Cleveland had defeated, 16 to 14, in the Bulldogs' first game on October 5.
- Plutarco Elías Calles was inaugurated as the 40th president of Mexico. The National Stadium in Mexico City was packed for the event that only lasted 15 minutes.
- Hannen Swaffer, the editor of the British newspaper The People recounted a séance he had attended along with Arthur Conan Doyle, Sir Robert McAlpine and others. Swaffer said that the medium contacted Lord Northcliffe, who admitted that Doyle was right about life beyond the grave. "I distrusted your judgement, but I see now how wrong I was", the spirit voice of Northcliffe was quoted as saying.
- Born:
  - Shirley Chisholm, American politician who became, in 1968, the first African-American woman to be elected to the U.S. Congress, representing the 12th district for New York; in Brooklyn, New York City (d. 2005)
  - Allan Sherman, American comedy writer and song parodist; in Chicago (d. 1973)
