= List of members of the Supreme Soviet of the Estonian Soviet Socialist Republic, 1940–1947 =

This is a list of members of the first legislature of the Supreme Soviet of the Estonian Soviet Socialist Republic which was the Estonian SSR's legislative chamber between 1940 and 1941, and between 1944 and 1992. In the first phase, the Soviet Union occupied the Republic of Estonia and dissolved the parliament (Riigikogu), then in its sixth legislature, on 5 July 1940. A new Stalinist "people's parliament" was "elected" on 14 and 15 July (with only members of the Soviet-backed Estonian Working People's Union allowed to stand for election), and the newly formed chamber announced the establishment of the "Estonian SSR" on 21 July and the self-proclaimed state was annexed by the Soviet Union on 6 August 1940. The chamber was officially called the Riigivolikogu (State Council) from inception until 25 August 1940 when it was designated the ENSV Ajutine Ülemnõukogu (Provisional Supreme Soviet of the ESSR) and then on 7 April 1941 was formally styled the ENSV Ülemnõukogu (Supreme Soviet of the Estonian SSR). Between July 1941 and 1944, Estonia was occupied by Germany. When the Soviet Union regained power in 1944, it continued the legislative session of the Supreme Soviet and extended it until the session's end on 16 February 1947. Elections for the second Supreme Soviet followed.

== List of members ==
Source: Jaan Toomla, Valitud ja Valitsenud: Eesti parlamentaarsete ja muude esinduskogude ning valitsuste isikkoosseis aastail 1917–1999 (National Library of Estonia, 1999), pp. 82–84.

Name	Party	Notes
Georg Abels	EKE, NLKP	
Aleksander Aben	EKE, NLKP	
Oskar Abori	EKE, NLKP	
Nigol Andresen	EKE, NLKP	
Herman Arbon	EKE, NLKP	Died in office 02.06.1942
Valli-Monika Haldre	EKE, NLKP	
Leonhard Hallop	EKE, NLKP	
Karl Hansson	EKE, NLKP	
Aadu Hint	EKE, NLKP	
Viktor Hion	EKE, NLKP	
Osvald Hirsch (Irs)	EKE, NLKP	Died in office 21.08.1941
Leonhard-Friedrich Illisson	EKE, NLKP	
Aleksander Ingalt	-, NLKP	Died in office 02.06.1942
Vanda Irs	EKE, NLKP	
Voldemar Jaanus	EKP, NLKP	
Kristjan Jalak	-, NLKP	Died in office 09.09.1944
Aleksei Janson	EKP, NLKP	Died in office 18.09.1941
Hugo Juhvelt	-, NLKP	Died in office in September 1941
Rudolf Jurtom	EKP, NLKP	
Aleksander Jõeäär	EKP, NLKP	
Mihkel Jürna	-, NLKP	
Erich Kadakas	EKP, NLKP	Died in office 02.06.1942
Paul Keerdo	EKP, NLKP	
Aleksander Kiidelmaa	EKP, NLKP	
Oskar Kirber		Died in office in July 1941
Hans Kruus	-, NLKP	
Martin Kurg	-, NLKP	Died in office 23.07.1944
Dimitri Kuzmin	EKP, NLKP	
Madis Kõmmus	-, NLKP	Died in office 27.10.1941
Max Laosson	EKP, NLKP	
Johannes Lauristin	EKP, NLKP	Died in office 28.08.1941
Olga Lauristin	EKP, NLKP	
Melania Lepik	EKP, NLKP	
Ruut Liiv	EKP, NLKP	
Huko Lumet	-, NLKP	
Lembit Lüüs	EKP, NLKP	
Mihkel Mihkelson		Removed in 1941
Otto Miider	-, NLKP	
Aleksander Mui	EKP, NLKP	Died in office 26.10.1941
Johannes Oinas	EKP, NLKP	Died in office 21.10.1941
Andrei Oja		Died in office 21.12.1941
Adolf Pauk	EKP, NLKP	Died in office 29.08.1941
Alide Pesur	EKP, NLKP	
Jaan Põder	EKP, NLKP	
August Põlts	EKP, NLKP	Died in office 23.11.1944
Jaan Päll		Died in office in July 1941
Adolf Päss	EKP, NLKP	
Vladimir Rea	EKP, NLKP	
Aleksander Resev	EKP, NLKP	
Georg Röövik	EKP, NLKP	
Paul Rummo		
Neeme Ruus	EKP, NLKP	Died in office 02.06.1942
Ruut Ruus (Rudolf)	-, NLKP	Died in office 15.09.1941
Artur Saks	EKP, NLKP	
Voldemar Sassi	EKP, NLKP	Died in office in July 1941
Johannes Semper	-, NLKP	
Oskar Sepre	EKP, NLKP	
Hindrek Sirelpuu		
Mihhail Sõštšikov		
Karl Säre	EKP, NLKP	Served until 1941
Georg Teiman (Taalman)	EKP, NLKP	Served until 21.12.1942
Johann Tamm	EKP, NLKP	Died in office 28.08.1941
Erich Tarkpea	EKP, NLKP	
Voldemar Telling	EKP, NLKP	
Juliana Teiman	EKP, NLKP	
Bernhard Tinnuri	EKP, NLKP	
Karl Toming	EKP, NLKP	Died in office in December 1941
Georg Toompuu	EKP, NLKP	
Jaan Tross	EKP, NLKP	Died in office 28.08.1941
Aleksander Tõnisson		Died in office 23.06.1941
Arkaadi Uibo	EKP, NLKP	
Maksim Unt	EKP, NLKP	Died in office 31.07.1941
Paul Uusman	EKP, NLKP	
Jüri Uustalu		
Leonardo Valts	EKP, NLKP	Died in office 14.09.1941
Johannes Vares	EKP, NLKP	Died in office 29.11.1946
Arnold Veimer	EKP, NLKP	
Nadežda Veimer (Tihanova)	-, NLKP	
Valentin Volkov	-, NLKP	
Jaan Änilane	EKP, NLKP	
