= Trial of the 149 =

1924 trial in Estonia where 149 communists were accused

Trial of the 149 (Estonian: 149 protsess) is the name given to the legal proceedings against 149 Estonian communists in Estonia that lasted from 10 to 27 November 1924. Many defendants were accused of high treason. One of them – Jaan Tomp – was sentenced to death and 39 other people to forced labour for life. The trial of the 149 was one of the largest trials in the pre-war Republic of Estonia, a record later beaten by the trials of the members of the nationalist Vaps Movement in 1935.

== Background ==
During the 1920s, Estonia was a politically stable country with a mainly agrarian economy, the industrial base was relatively small and the peasantry were largely satisfied with the government's land redistribution policies of 1919–1920, thus there was little sympathy for the communists outside of cities. In contrast, the communists achieved several electoral victories in urban areas, namely coming first in both the 1921 and the 1923 municipal elections in Tallinn, working under front organisations like the Workers' United Front and Communist Workers List.

Following the failed Hamburg Uprising and Bulgarian September Uprising, the Estonian authorities decided to crack down on the small but very militant Estonian Communist Party. On 21 January 1924, the security police raided a club called "The Workers' Cellar" (Tööliste kelder) where 185 representatives of workers' organisations had gathered for a meeting. The names of people present were recorded and the chairmen of the meeting – Hendrik Allik, Paul Keerdo and Jaan Tomp – were arrested. That same day, Vladimir Kangur was arrested in Narva. They all were accused of being the founders of the Workers' United Front (Töörahva Ühine Väerind). Several members of the Riigikogu also belonged to this organisation.

This raid was the first in a series of operations that led to the arrest of 200 people. Communist newspapers and organisations were shut down. 229 workers' societies were dissolved as they were accused of unconstitutional activities.

Some of the arrested communists managed to escape and they could not be tried. In the end 149 people were prosecuted.

== Trial ==
Most of the accused did not admit guilt. Some of those who did came up with the excuse that they needed the money provided by Soviet communists to improve their life. Of 149 defendants, 88 declined a lawyer. Not all defendants were present in the courtroom, and some had to be removed as they started to protest. One of the removed persons was Vladimir Kangur, a member of Riigikogu. Some people could not be arrested and tried because of their status as members of parliament. Some of these included Eliise Priks, Eduard Luts and Aleksander Rimmel.

The defendants faced different charges. The whole bill of indictment was 150 pages long. The most general and common charge was "participation in a pan-Estonian secret communist organisation".

== Verdict ==
The verdict was read on 27 November 1924.

- 39 people were sentenced to forced labour for life;
- 28 people were sentenced to forced labour for 15 years;
- 6 people were sentenced to forced labour for 12 years;
- 19 people were sentenced to forced labour for 10 years;
- 6 people were sentenced to forced labour for 8 years;
- 15 people were sentenced to forced labour for 6 years;
- 5 people were sentenced to prison for 4 years;
- 11 people were sentenced to prison for 3 years.

Seven defendants were acquitted of all charges: Otto Laas, August Palovere, Peeter Palovere, Jaan Pois, Bernhard Sepp, Paul Sepp and Johan Steinfeldt.

Jaan Tomp had received his verdict before the others. He had been sentenced to death and executed on 14 November 1924.

=== Life sentences ===
The 39 defendants sentenced to forced labour for life were: Hendrik Allik, Aleksander Jaanson, Vladimir Kangur, Paul Keerdo, August Hansen, Madis Kask, Johannes Kuppar, Peeter Petree, Jaan Kamberg, Aleksander Reinson, Johannes Suuster, Joosep Saat, Herman Arbon, Karl Tuisk, Elfriede Morgenson, Rosalie Veltson, Leena Laid, Aliide Sommerling, Wilhelmine Kruul, Olga Künnapuu, Oskar Sepre, Voldemar Sassi, Peeter Mihelson, August Kuhlberg, Jakob Saar, Arnold Veimer, Georg Abels, Wladimir Rea, Jüri Vilt, Peeter Jentson, Johannes Oinas, Johannes Roots, Paul Krams, Karl Kuusk, Karl Pauk, Andrei Murro, Voldemar Jurjev, Johannes Jaama, and Adolf Pauk.

=== 15 years forced Labor ===
The 28 defendants (including seven children) sentenced to 15 years of forced Labor were: Aleksander Resev, Richard Busch, Leontine Vels, Elmar Bauer, Alfred Valdsak, Johan Leesment, Heinrich Kallas, Johannes Leimann, Eduard Vei, August Mäemat, Elise Priks, Jakob Tsõgankov, Gustav Lange, Hans Tiruson, Jaan Tagel, Boris Kumm, Anton Leerimaa, Feliks Tipman, Ludmilla Uusmann/Ausmann, Aleksander Rimmel, Eduard Luts, Ernst Heidemann, Adolf Silmer, Johannes Oravas, Bernhard Tinnori, Voldemar Hannibal, Alide Silberg/Silber and Eduard Jaama.

== Amnesty ==
After many Estonian communists including the entire Central Committee of the Communist Party of Estonia were killed during the Great Purge, having earlier fled to the Soviet Union after the failed 1924 Estonian coup d'état attempt, and Comintern was no longer funding and instructing the local party, the Estonian state released the convicted communists still in prison in 1938.

== See also ==
- 1924 Estonian coup d'état attempt
