= Vares Government of Estonia =

Puppet government in Estonia installed by the Soviet Union (June - August 1940)

The Vares Government (Estonian: Varese valitsus) was a puppet government named after prime minister Johannes Vares, installed by the Soviet Union in Estonia, in office from 21 June 1940 to 25 August 1940.

== History ==
On 14 June 1940, the Soviet Union gave the Republic of Estonia an ultimatum to permit the entry of an unspecified number of Red Army troops into the country. The ultimatum was accepted by Estonia and immediately thereafter, the Red Army went on to occupy the country. The formation of a new cabinet was supervised by Andrei Zhdanov, deputy of Vyacheslav Molotov and a close associate of Lavrentiy Beria, who selected Johannes Vares as the prime minister. Similar transitional puppet governments were also formed in Latvia (under Prime Minister Augusts Kirhenšteins, supervised by Andrey Vyshinsky) and Lithuania (under Prime Minister Justas Paleckis, supervised by Vladimir Dekanozov).

Parliamentary elections were organized by the occupying authorities and held on 14 and 15 July. The sole list of candidates in the election came from the Estonian Working People's Union, a front organization of the Communist Party of Estonia, which until recently had been illegal in the country. The two-chamber Riigikogu was dissolved prior to the election, and only the lower chamber of parliament, the Riigivolikogu (the Chamber of Deputies) was allowed to convene. According to official numbers, the Estonian Working People's Union won all 80 seats of the Riigivolikogu with 92.8% of the votes cast.

Following the rigged parliamentary elections, the first meeting of the Riigivolikogu was held on July 21. The parliament unanimously passed declarations to transition the Republic of Estonia into a socialist republic and to apply for membership as the 15th republic of the Soviet Union. The application was accepted at the meeting of the Supreme Soviet of the Soviet Union on 6 August 1940, thus formally incorporating Estonia into the Soviet Union. The Vares' Cabinet was then replaced by the Council of People's Commissars of the Estonian SSR, headed by Johannes Lauristin, on August 25.

== Members ==
| Name | Portrait | Position |
|---|---|---|
| Johannes Vares | | Prime Minister |
| Hans Kruus | | Deputy Prime Minister |
| Nigol Andresen | | Minister of Foreign Affairs |
| Aleksander Jõeäär | | Minister of Agricultural Affairs |
| Neeme Ruus | | Minister of Social Affairs |
| Orest Kärm | | Minister of Transport |
| Boris Sepp | | Minister of Justice (until 4 July 1940) |
| Friedrich Niggol | | Minister of Justice (from 5 July 1940) |
| Juhan Nihtig (Narma) | | Minister of Economic Affairs |
| Tõnis Rotberg | | Minister of War |
| Johannes Semper | | Minister of Education |
| Maksim Unt | | Minister of the Interior |
