= List of members of the Supreme Soviet of the Estonian Soviet Socialist Republic, 1947–1951 =

This is a list of members of the second legislature of the Supreme Soviet of the Estonian Soviet Socialist Republic which was the Estonian Soviet Socialist Republic's legislative chamber between 1940 and 1941, and between 1944 and 1992. The session ran from 19 February 1947 to 19 February 1951, =and followed the 1947 Estonian Supreme Soviet election in which only Bloc of Communists and Non-Party Candidates was the only party able to contest the elections.

== List of members ==
Source: Jaan Toomla, Valitud ja Valitsenud: Eesti parlamentaarsete ja muude esinduskogude ning valitsuste isikkoosseis aastail 1917–1999 (National Library of Estonia, 1999), pp. 86–88.

Name	Party	Notes
Julius Aamisepp		Died 19.01.1950
Georg Abels	NLKP	
Heinrich Ajo	NLKP	
Hendrik Allik	NLKP	
Vassili Ananjitš	NLKP	
Nigol Andresen	NLKP	
Boris Bersin	NLKP	
Konstantin Blagodarov	NLKP	
Konstantin Boitsov	NLKP	
Eduard Brandt	NLKP	
Valli-Moonika Haldre	NLKP	
Augustin Hansen	NLKP	
Hilda Hein		
Aleksander Hendrikson	NLKP	
Viktor Hion	NLKP	
Mihkel Ilmjärv		Died 30.01.1951
Eduard Inti	NLKP	
Aleksander Jaanus (Ivanov-Jaanus)	NLKP	
August Jakobson	NLKP	
Maria Jefimova (Efimova)		Resigned 1949
Vladimir Jefremov	NLKP	
Helene Johani (Mugasto)	NLKP	
Aleksander Jõeäär	NLKP	
Mihkel Jürna	NLKP	
Eugen Kapp	-, NLKP	
Nikolai Karotamm	NLKP	
Lilli Karro	-, NLKP	
Marta Karrus		
Elfriede Kastra	-, NLKP	
Paul Keerdo	NLKP	
Linda Kipper	NLKP	
Arnold Kress	NLKP	
Hans Kruus	NLKP	
Rosa-Alma Krüger	NLKP	
August Kründel	NLKP	
Leida Kulbin		
Jaan Kuld	-, NLKP	
Jevgeni Kungurtsev	NLKP	
Dimitri Kuzmin	NLKP	
Villem Kuusik	NLKP	
Eela Kuusküll (Sõstramets)	NLKP	
Johannes Ladoga		
Max Laosson	NLKP	
Eduard Lind	NLKP	Died 11.02.1950
Johannes Lindam	NLKP	
Vilhelm Lombak	NLKP	
Jaan Lukas		Arrested 1950
Olga Lund (Gerretz)		
Julius Maran	-, NLKP	
Salme Mardi	-, NLKP	
Vassili Matvejev	NLKP	
Heino Merendi	NLKP	
Mihkel Merilain	NLKP	
August Minne	NLKP	
Vjatšeslav Molotov	NLKP	
Julius Murd	-, NLKP	
Osvald Must		
Aleksander Mäe	NLKP	
Anna-Rosalie Mägi		
Aleksei Müürisepp	NLKP	Elected 18.12.1949
Nikolai Natšinkin	NLKP	
Linda Otto		
Aleksei Ovsjannikov	NLKP	
Kaarel Paas (Pauk)	NLKP	
Aleksander Pitk	NLKP	
Miralda Prääts	NLKP	
August Pusta	NLKP	
Endel Puusepp	NLKP	
Nikolai Puusepp	NLKP	
Eduard Päll	NLKP	
Anna Rannaste		
Arnold Raud	NLKP	
Hilda Reinhold		
Aleksander Resev	NLKP	
Ernst Ristmägi	NLKP	
Anatoli Roslak	NLKP	
Helene Saar	ÜLKNÜ	
Miili Selge	NLKP	
Elfriede Selgmäe		
Johannes Semper	NLKP	
Mihhail Serjugin	NLKP	
Maire Soobik		
Jossif Stalin	NLKP	
Jaan Suits		
Juhan Suting		
Eduard Säremat	NLKP	
Voldemar Zukker	NLKP	
Andrei Ždanov	NLKP	Died 31.08.1948
Voldemar Telling	NLKP	
Peeter Tiido	NLKP	
Hamlet Tiits	NLKP	
Alma Tomingas		
Andrei Torf	NLKP	
Arnold Treiberg	NLKP	
Nikolai Turkestanov	NLKP	
Paul Uusman	NLKP	
Artur Vaha	NLKP	
Arnold Veimer	NLKP	
Johannes Villevelt	-, NLKP	
Fatinia Voolmäe	NLKP	
Bronislav Võrse	NLKP	
