= 1940 Latvian parliamentary election =

Parliamentary elections were held in Latvia on 14 and 15 July 1940, alongside simultaneous elections in Estonia and Lithuania, following the Soviet occupation of the three countries. The Communist Party of Latvia was legalised, and it created the "Latvian Working People's Bloc" (essentially an enlarged Communist Party) to take part in the elections. It was the only organization allowed to stand in the elections; an attempt to include the Democratic Bloc (Demokrātiskais bloks), an alliance of all now-banned Latvian parties except the Social Democratic Workers' Party, on the ballot was suppressed.

The main figures of the Democratic Bloc were either arrested and deported (Atis Ķeniņš, Pēteris Berģis and Jānis Bankavs) or shot (Hugo Celmiņš) shortly afterwards, while a few (Voldemārs Zāmuēls, Jānis Breikšs) managed to escape the repression by fleeing from the country. As was the case in Estonia and Lithuania, the elections were blatantly rigged, with the Working People's Bloc winning every seat.

== Results ==
Party	Votes	%	Seats
Latvian Working People's Bloc	1,155,807	97.84	100
Against	25,516	2.16	–
Total	1,181,323	100.00	100
Registered voters/turnout	1,246,216	–	
Source: My Riga

== Aftermath ==
Along with its sister parliaments in Estonia (Riigivolikogu) and Lithuania (Liaudies Seimas), the newly elected People's Parliament (Tautas Saeima) convened on 21 July. It declared Latvia a Soviet republic and requested admission to the Soviet Union on the same day. The request was approved by the Soviet government on 5 August. This move violated the constitution, which stipulated that a major change to the basic constitutional order could only be enacted after two-thirds of the electorate approved it via a plebiscite. Soviet sources maintained that the election marked the culmination of a socialist revolution that the Latvian people carried out free of Soviet influence, and the "People's Parliament" was a democratic institution of the Latvian people that ultimately voted to join the Soviet Union. However, Baltic and Western sources maintained that the election was merely an attempt to give legal sanction to the Soviet occupation.

When Latvia declared independence in 1990, it contended that the 1940 election was invalid on several counts. According to the declaration, the election was conducted in "a state of political terror" on the basis of an illegal and unconstitutional election law, and the election results were heavily falsified. It also noted that the Working People's Bloc was the only grouping allowed to contest the election out of 17 that submitted lists, and accused the bloc of deceiving the people about its intention to make Latvia part of the Soviet Union. It also noted that under the constitution, the People's Saeima did not have the authority to change the form of the state, but was required to submit such changes to the people for approval in a referendum. On this basis, the declaration argued that all acts of the People's Saeima, including the request to join the Soviet Union, were ipso facto void. It also maintained that Latvia did not need to follow the process of secession from the Soviet Union, since the Soviet takeover was invalid under both international law and Latvian law. Latvia's official position since 1990 is that the declaration was reasserting an independence that still de jure existed even though it had de facto lost its independence after the Soviet takeover.

== See also ==
- 1940 Estonian parliamentary election
- 1940 Lithuanian parliamentary election
