= 1940 Constitution of the Estonian Soviet Socialist Republic =

1940 Constitution of the Estonian SSR
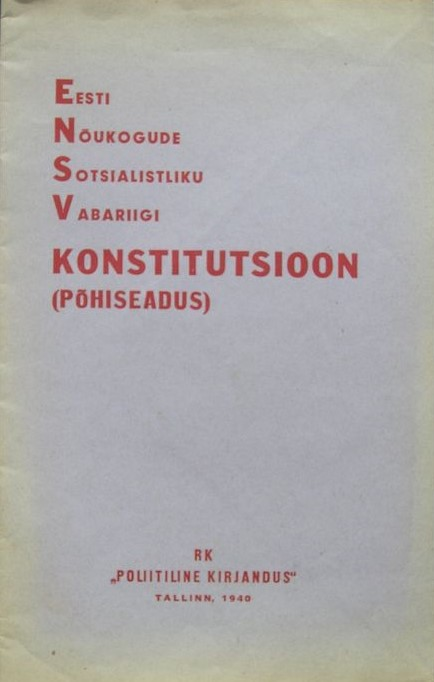

Overview
- Original title: Eesti Nõukogude Sotsialistliku Vabariigi konstitutsioon
- Jurisdiction: Estonian SSR (formally part of USSR)
- Ratified: 25 August 1940
- Date effective: 25 August 1940
- Location: Tallinn, Estonia
- Signatories: People's State Assembly (Riigivolikogu)

The 1940 Constitution of Estonian Soviet Socialist Republic (Estonian: Eesti Nõukogude Sotsialistliku Vabariigi Konstitutsioon (Põhiseadus); Russian: Конституция (Основной Закон) Эстонской Советской Социалистической Республики) was the communist state constitution unanimously adopted by the "2nd People's State Assembly", a puppet legislature in the then Soviet-occupied Estonia, on 25 August 1940.

The 1940 Constitution of the Estonian SSR was effectively a translated and only marginally adjusted copy of the Stalinist 1936 Constitution of the Soviet Union.

== Background ==
Shortly after the June 1940 Soviet invasion and occupation of Estonia and the annexation of the newly created "Soviet Socialist Republic" into the Soviet Union which was formalized by the Decree of the Supreme Soviet of the USSR "On the Entry of the Estonian SSR into the Soviet Union" on 6 August 1940, a new constitution was formally adopted for the Estonian SSR on 25 August 1940. The constitution declared itself to symbolize the establishment of the Soviet government in Estonia "as a result of the overthrow of the power of capitalists and large landowners."

In later years, the constitution was amended in the sessions of the Supreme Soviet of the Estonian SSR. The constitution was replaced by the 1978 Constitution of the Estonian SSR.

== Structure ==
The Constitution is divided into 11 chapters and 119 articles.

1. The Organization of Society
2. The Organization of the State
3. The Highest Organs of State Authority of the Estonian SSR
4. The Organs of Government of the Estonian SSR
5. The Organs of the Local Governments
6. The Budget of the Estonian SSR
7. The Courts and the Procurator's Office
8. Fundamental Rights and Duties of Citizens
9. The Electoral System
10. Arms, Flag, Capital
11. Procedure for Amending the Constitution

== Provisions ==
=== Economic system ===
The Constitution abolished the private economy and replaced the system with the socialist economy. The prerequisite was the liquidation of the private sectors of economy, such as nationalization of industrial enterprises, production facilities, banks, land ownership, transport and communications. Socialist ownership in the Estonian SSR was either a national property or cooperative ownership. In addition to the socialist economic system, the private households of individual peasants and craftsmen and small industrial and commercial private companies were allowed within the limits set by the Law of the Estonian SSR.

=== Territorial divisions ===
The territorial divisions of the Estonian SSR is regulated in the Article 14 of the Constitution. Until 1950, the territorial divisions of the pre-occupation Estonia was still maintained in the constitution. At the time of the promulgation of the constitution in 1940, Estonian SSR is divided into 11 counties (maakonnad) and 4 cities which does not belong to any counties. Counties and cities with no counties were completely dissolved in 1950 as Estonian SSR was divided into regions (rajoonid) and (until 1953) oblasts. Until the 1960s the borders of regions changed often until 15 rayons were left.
