= Tientsin (disambiguation) =

Tianjin, a municipality in China, is also spelled Tientsin.

Tientsin may also refer to:

- Battle of Tientsin, a 1900 battle of the Boxer Rebellion
- Chinese dispatch boat Tientsin, launched in 1863
- Langfang, known as Tientsin Prefecture until 1973
- Tien Tsin, a ship which brought European settlers to Port Walcott, Western Australia
  - Tien Tsin Harbour, now Port Walcott
  - Tien Tsin, now Cossack, Western Australia, a ghost town

== See also ==
- Tianjin Massacre, a massacre of Christians in the late 19th century
- Tientsin Conference, series of conferences of Chinese warlords, beginning in 1924
- Tientsin Mystic, Chinese TV series
