= Joosep Saat =

Estonian politician, journalist and academic

Joosep Saat (30 July 1900, Tupenurme – 16 January 1977, Tallinn) was an Estonian communist politician, historian, journalist and academic.

In 1921 he became a member of Communist Party of Estonia. In 1924 he was one of defendants of Trial of the 149, and the verdict was "forced labour for life". In 1938 he received amnesty.

From 1949 to 1956 he was the executive director of Institute of Party History of the Central Committee of the Communist Party of Estonia. From 1955 to 1959 he was the Chairman of the Supreme Soviet of the Estonian Soviet Socialist Republic.

In 1951 he became a member of Estonian SSR Academy of Sciences.

== Awards ==
- 1950: Order of Lenin
- 1969: Meritorious Scientist of the Estonian SSR
- 1970, 1977: Estonian SSR State Prize
- Order of the Badge of Honour
- Order of the October Revolution
- Two Orders of the Red Banner of Labour
