= Arnold Koop =

Estonian historian (1922–1988)

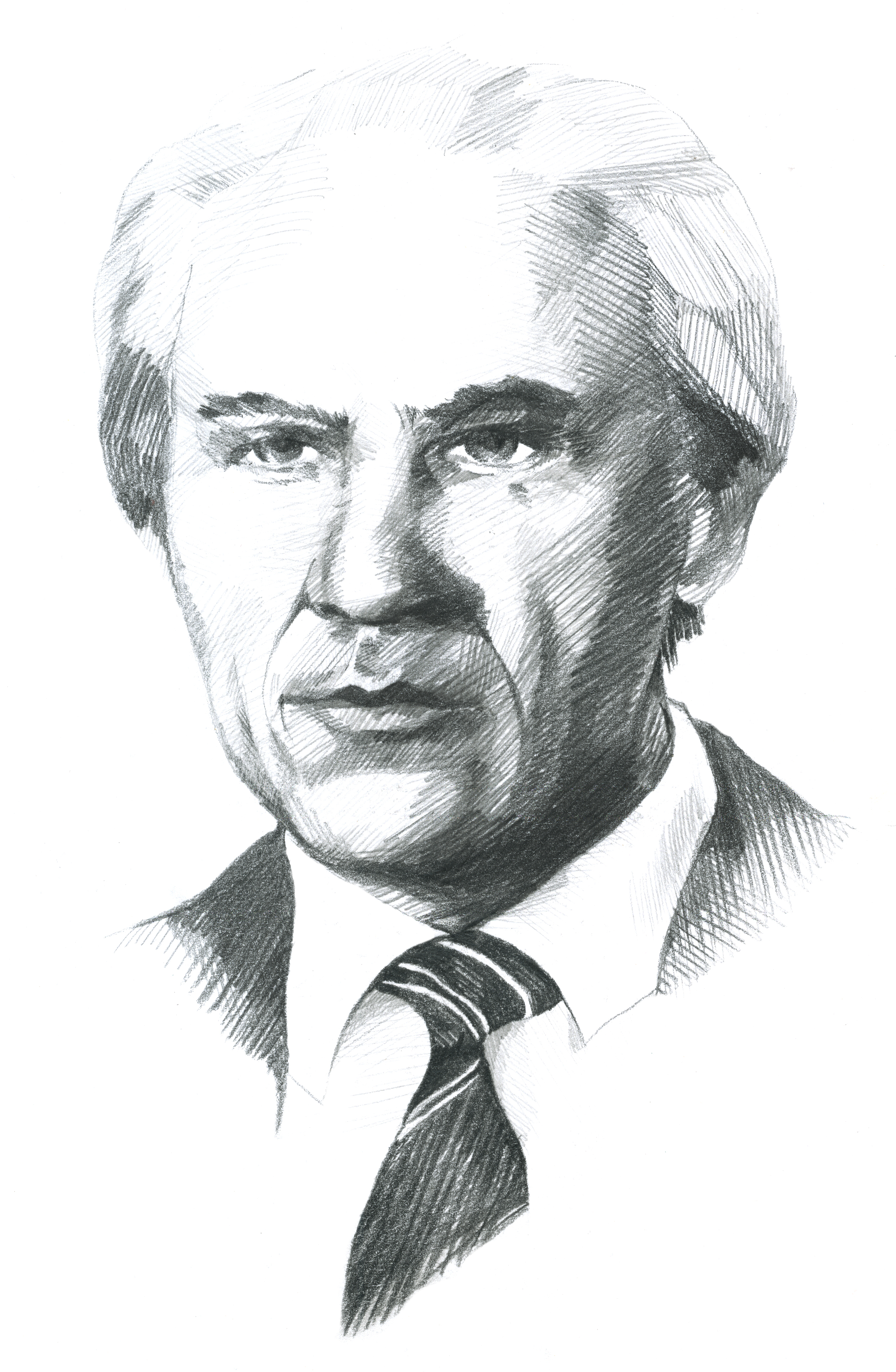

Chairman of the Supreme Soviet of the Estonian Soviet Socialist Republic
- In office 19 March 1967 – 13 June 1971 Serving with Ilmar Vahe
- Preceded by: Vaino Väljas
- Succeeded by: Ilmar Vahe

Personal details
- Born: July 16, 1922 Saint Petersburg Governorate
- Died: April 21, 1988 (aged 65) Moscow, Soviet Union
- Party: CPSU

Arnold Koop (16 July 1922, Saint Petersburg Governorate – 21 April 1988 Moscow) was a Soviet Estonian pedagogue and Communist Party functionary.

From 1960 until 1968 he was the rector of Tallinn Pedagogical Institute. From 1970 to 1988 he was the rector of the University of Tartu, where he was responsible for exerting political control at the university, closing the sociology laboratory and dismissing its director, and shifting its focus from Estonian to Soviet studies. Koop was known as an ideologically orthodox Communist, who supported the neo-Stalinist tightening up policies of the 1970s Brezhnev era.
