= Friedrich Niggol =

Estonian lawyer and politician (1900–1942)

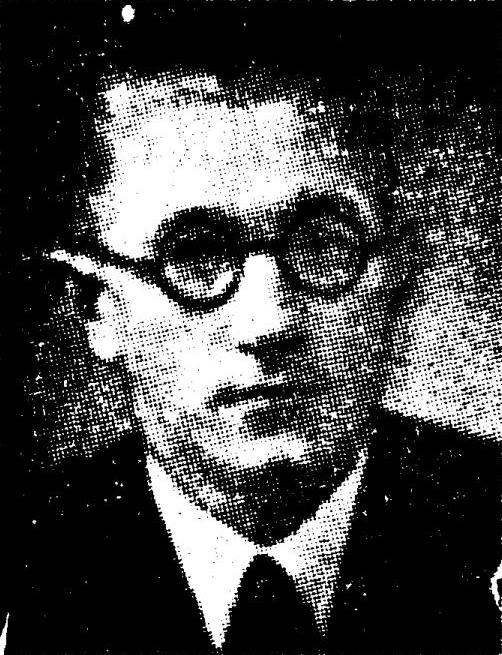
Friedrich Niggol.

Friedrich Niggol (5 January 1900 in Dorpat, Kreis Dorpat, Governorate of Livonia – 27 May 1942 in Tallinn, Reichskommissariat Ostland) was an Estonian lawyer and politician.

== Biography ==
Niggol took part in the Estonian War of Independence. In 1923, he graduated from the Faculty of Law at the University of Tartu. He worked as a forensic examiner in Tallinn in 1926–1930. In 1930–1932 Niggol worked as a lawyer at Viljandi-Pärnu Circuit Court. In 1932–1934, he was Deputy Chief Justice of the Rakvere-Paide Circuit Court, and in December 1934–1938 he was Deputy Chief Justice of the Tartu Circuit Court. Niggol then worked as a justice at the Tallinn Court of Appeal from 1938.

On 5 July 1940, Niggol replaced Boris Sepp as Minister of Justice in Johannes Vares' cabinet after the occupation of the Baltic states by the Soviet Union. He held this position until the cabinet was replaced by the Council of People's Commissars of the Estonian SSR on 25 August 1940. Niggol was then appointed as a justice of the Supreme Court of the Estonian SSR in January–April 1941.

When Nazi Germany occupied Estonia in July 1941, Niggol remained in the country. He was arrested by the Germans and died of tuberculosis in Tallinn Central Prison in May 1942.
