= Villem Tammai =

Estonian politician

Villem Tammai (8 March 1892 Vändra, Kreis Pernau – 24 June 1973 Tallinn) was an Estonian politician. He was a member of IV Riigikogu since 9 May 1931. He replaced Maksim Unt following of major legislative reforms of those related to education and public administration
