= 1947 Estonian Supreme Soviet election =

1947 elections in Estonia

Elections to the Supreme Soviet of the Estonian SSR were held on 16 February 1947. They were the first elections since the Estonian SSR was declared on 21 July 1940 and the first after World War II.

The elections took place on the same day as the elections to the Supreme Soviet of the Latvian SSR.

The Bloc of Communists and Non-Party Candidates was the only party permitted to contest the elections, and won all 100 seats. Elected members included Joseph Stalin (Tallinn constituency 9), Vyacheslav Molotov (Tallinn constituency 2) and Andrei Zhdanov (Kohtla-Järve constituency no 84).

== Results ==
Party	Votes	%	Seats
Bloc of Communists and Non-Partisans	768,162	96.48	100
Against	28,003	3.52	–
Total	796,165	100.00	100
Valid votes	796,165	99.68	
Invalid/blank votes	2,593	0.32	
Total votes	798,758	100.00	
Registered voters/turnout	804,172	99.33	
Source: Liivik, Pravda No. 43, February 19, 1947

== See also ==
- List of members of the Supreme Soviet of the Estonian Soviet Socialist Republic, 1947–1951
