= Johannes Lott =

Estonian lawyer and politician (1930–2024)

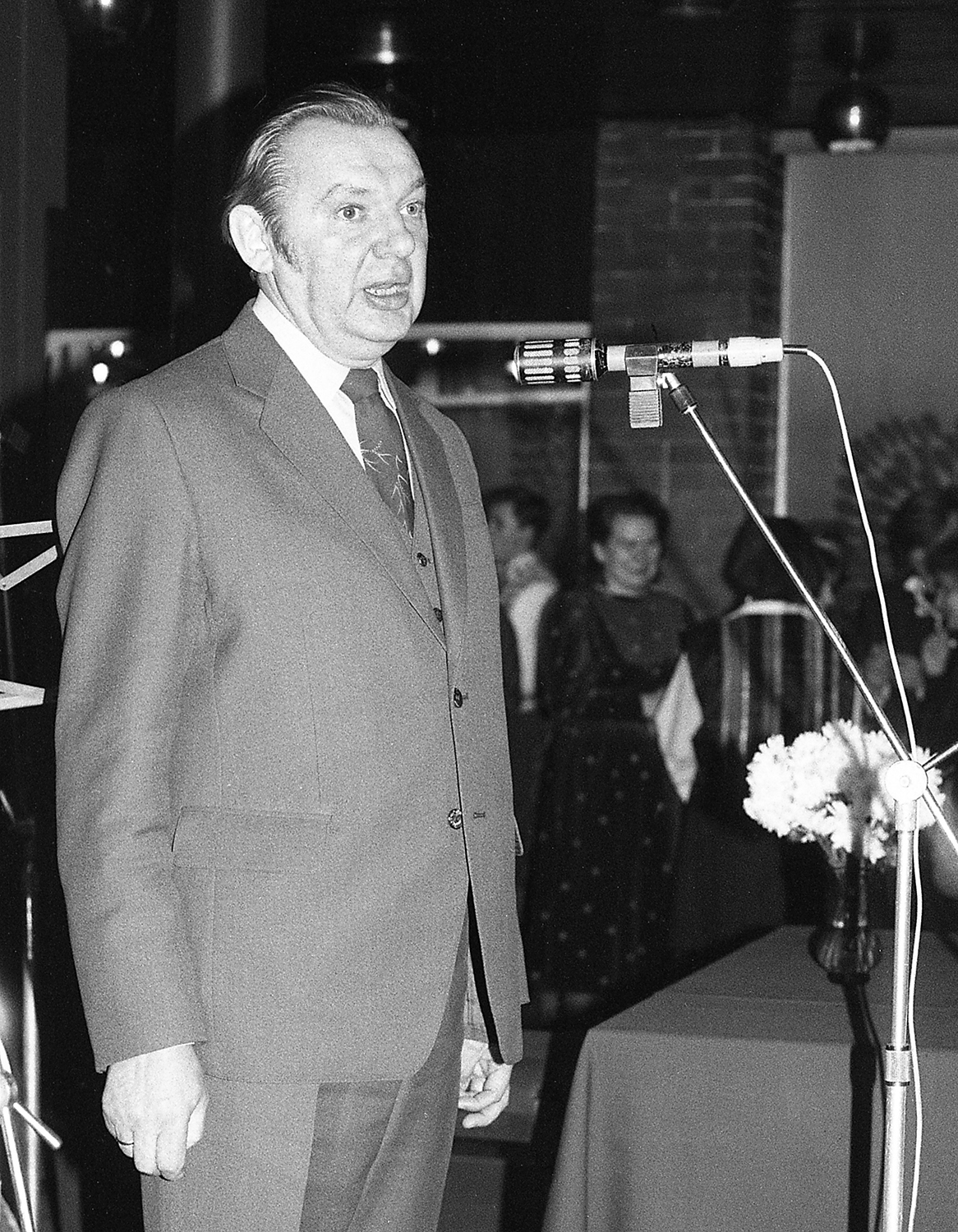
- Lott in 1987

Chairman of the Supreme Soviet of the Estonian SSR
- In office 4 July 1975 – 14 December 1978
- Preceded by: Ilmar Vahe
- Succeeded by: Jüri Suurhans

Personal details
- Born: 28 February 1930 Saarepere, Estonia
- Died: 3 June 2024 (aged 94)
- Party: CPSU
- Education: Tartu State University
- Occupation: Lawyer

Johannes Lott (28 February 1930 – 3 June 2024) was an Estonian lawyer and politician. A member of the Communist Party of the Soviet Union, he served a Chairman of the Supreme Soviet of the Estonian SSR from 1975 to 1978.

Lott died on 3 June 2024, at the age of 94.
