= Boris Sepp =

Estonian lawyer and politician

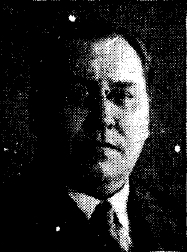
Boris Sepp

Boris Sepp (17 August 1894 in Kuressaare, Kreis Ösel, Governorate of Livonia – 24 November 1942 in Gorki Oblast, Russian SFSR) was an Estonian lawyer and politician.

== Biography ==
Sepp studied law at the University of Tartu. During the First World War he came to Russia, where he joined the Bolsheviks. In 1922 he returned to Estonia, and worked as a forensic investigator in Rakvere, then in Tartu and Pärnu. In the 1920s and 1930s, Sepp worked as a lawyer.

On 21 June 1940, Sepp was appointed Minister of Justice in Johannes Vares' cabinet after the occupation of the Baltic states by the Soviet Union. He was dismissed from this position for unclear reasons on 4 July, and replaced by Friedrich Niggol.

On 25 November 1940, Sepp was arrested by the NKVD and accused of having stifled revolutionary activities in Estonia during the 1920s. In March 1941, he was given a five-year sentence in a correctional camp. Sepp died while imprisoned in Gorki Oblast in November 1942.
