= Orest Kärm =

Soviet Estonian politician

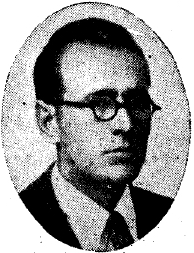
Orest Kärm.

Orest Kärm (13 May 1902 in Pärsama, Kreis Ösel, Governorate of Livonia – 1942 or August 1944) was a Soviet Estonian politician.

Kärm was educated as an engineer in soil science. From 1936, he worked for AS "Eesti Turbatööstused", a state-owned company operating in the peat industry.

On 21 June 1940, Kärm was appointed as Minister of Transport in Johannes Vares' cabinet after the occupation of the Baltic States by the Soviet Union. After the cabinet was replaced by the Council of People's Commissars of the Estonian SSR on 25 August 1940, he remained as People's Commissar of Public Utilities until his dismissal on 6 April 1941.

After Nazi Germany's occupation of Estonia in July 1941, Kärm was arrested by the Germans as a member of the previous Soviet government. He was subsequently executed by the German occupiers, either in 1942 or August 1944.
