= Institute of Party History of the Central Committee of the Communist Party of Estonia =

The Institute of Party History of the Central Committee of the Communist Party of Estonia (Estonian: Eestimaa Kommunistliku Partei Keskkomitee Partei Ajaloo Instituut) was a research body in the Estonian SSR, managed under the Central Committee of the Communist Party of Estonia. Founded in 1947, the institute functioned as the republic-level branch of the Marx–Engels–Lenin Institute of the All-Union Communist Party (Bolsheviks). The institute was based in Tallinn.

== Activities ==
The key functions of the institute was to conduct studies on party history and publish Marxist–Leninist literature in Estonian. The institute maintained the party archives. The institute published serials on party history Estonian, Russian, German, and English.

== Directors ==
At the time of its foundation Johannes Käbin served as the Director the Party History Institute. Joosep Saat served as Deputy Director of the Party History Institute 1947–1949, then as its Director 1949–1956. A. Päss served as Director of the Party History Institute 1956–1960. In January 1961 Alexander Pankseyev was named as the Director of the institute, a post he retained throughout the 1960s and 1970s.

== Later period ==
In March 1989, the Party History Institute declared that the Molotov–Ribbentrop Pact of 1939 had been politically unjustified. On May 30, 1990, the Communist Party of Estonia Central Committee decided to reform the Institute of Party History to the Research Centre of the Communist Party of Estonia (Eestimaa Kommunistliku Partei Teaduskeskus), a move that was put in place on July 1, 1990. The Research Centre was closed down in 1991. The party archives were transferred to the Estonian State Archives.
