= List of chairmen of the Supreme Soviet of the Estonian Soviet Socialist Republic =

The chairman of the Supreme Soviet of the Estonian Soviet Socialist Republic was the presiding officer of that assembly. It is not to be confused with the chairman of the Presidium of the Supreme Soviet of the Estonian Soviet Socialist Republic; he was the head of state.

Below is a list of the office-holders:

Legislature	Term	Chairman	Term
1st Supreme Soviet of the ESSR	August 25, 1940 – February 16, 1947	Voldemar Sassi	August 25, 1940 – July 1941
2nd Supreme Soviet of the ESSR	February 19, 1947 – February 19, 1951	August Kründel	March 5, 1947 – February 19, 1951
3rd Supreme Soviet of the ESSR	February 25, 1951 – February 27, 1955	August Kründel; Otto Merimaa	March 27, 1951 – January 14, 1953; January 14, 1953 – February 27, 1955
4th Supreme Soviet of the ESSR	March 4, 1955 – March 4, 1959	Joosep Saat	April 5, 1955 – March 4, 1959
5th Supreme Soviet of the ESSR	March 15, 1959 – March 17, 1963	Harald Ilves	April 23, 1959 – March 17, 1963
6th Supreme Soviet of the ESSR	March 17, 1963 – March 19, 1967	Vaino Väljas	April 18, 1963 – April 20, 1967
7th Supreme Soviet of the ESSR	March 19, 1967 – June 13, 1971	Arnold Koop; Ilmar Vahe	April 20, 1967 – December 18, 1968; December 18, 1968 – June 13, 1971
8th Supreme Soviet of the ESSR	June 13, 1971 – June 15, 1975	Ilmar Vahe	July 13, 1971 – June 15, 1975
9th Supreme Soviet of the SSR	June 15, 1975 – February 24, 1980	Johannes Lott; Jüri Suurhans	July 4, 1975 –December 14, 1978; December 14, 1978 – February 24, 1980
10th Supreme Soviet of the ESSR	February 24, 1980 – February 24, 1985	Jüri Suurhans; Matti Pedak	March 28, 1980 – July 5, 1982; July 5, 1982 – March 26, 1985
11th Supreme Soviet of the ESSR	February 24, 1985 – March 18, 1990	Valde Roosmaa; Enn-Arno Sillari	March 27, 1985 – May 18, 1989; May 18, 1989 – March 18, 1990
12th Supreme Soviet of the ESSR	March 23, 1990 – September 29, 1992	Arnold Rüütel (chairman); Ülo Nugis (speaker)	March 29, 1990 – October 6, 1992; March 29, 1990 – October 6, 1992

== See also ==
- Riigikogu

== Sources ==
- "Elected representatives and state leaders". Members of Estonia's parliamentary and other assemblies as well as governments 1917–1999. Compiled by Jaan Toomla, Tallinn 1999
- Liisa Maadla. Archivist. National Archives of Estonia
