= Pēteris Berģis =

Latvian politician

Pēteris Berģis (18 March 1882 – 21 January 1942) was a Latvian lawyer and politician.

== Biography ==
Berģis graduated from the St. Petersburg Polytechnic Institute and from the University of Kazan in 1916.

During the Latvian freedom revolution in November 1919, he returned to Latvia. In 1920, he was one of the members of the Latvian delegation in peace talks with Soviet Russia. He later acted as a member of the Latvian-Lithuanian border arbitration tribunal.

He was democratic member of the center, but later joined the Radical Democratic Party. In 1922, he was elected to the 1st Saeima.

On 14 June 1941 Berģis was arrested and deported to the USSR, where he died in 1942 in the camp in Solikamsk.
