= 1940 Estonian parliamentary election =

Parliamentary elections were held in Estonia on 14 and 15 July 1940 alongside simultaneous elections in Latvia and Lithuania. The elections followed the Soviet occupation of the three countries. As was the case in Latvia and Lithuania, the elections in Estonia were blatantly rigged. They were also unconstitutional, since only seats for the lower chamber of the Riigikogu, the Chamber of Deputies (Riigivolikogu), were contested; the upper chamber, the National Council, had been dissolved and was never reconvened. According to August Rei, one of independent Estonia's last envoys to Moscow, under the Estonian constitution, the Chamber of Deputies could exercise "no legislative power" without the National Council..

The Estonian Working People's Union, a Communist front group, was the only party allowed to run and won all 80 seats, allegedly with 93% of the votes cast and the remaining 7% having been declared invalid. The newly elected Chamber of Deputies declared the Estonian SSR on 21 July and requested admission to the Soviet Union the following day. The request was approved by the Soviet government on 6 August.

== Background ==
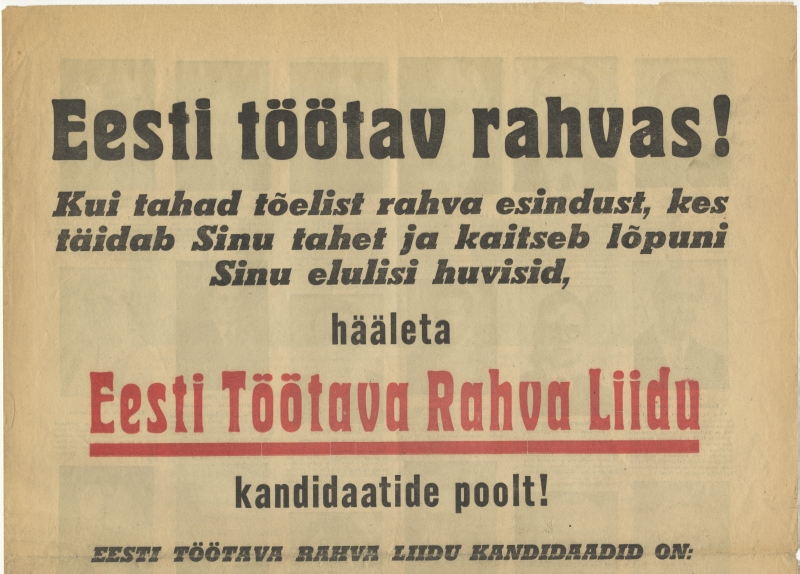
A flyer to vote for the Estonian Working People's Union

The elections followed the Soviet occupation of Estonia in June. The Communist Party established the Estonian Working People's Union to run in the elections, whilst despite having only three days to organise, the opposition put forward 78 candidates in 66 of the 80 Riigikogu constituencies. However, Prime Minister Johannes Vares was ordered by Soviet politician Andrei Zhdanov to remove opposition candidates from the ballot. Opposition candidates were required to present a manifesto within a few hours, which most of them did. However, almost all were subsequently removed by a mixture of threats, violence and invalidations. Only one opposition candidate remained; Jüri Rajur-Liivak, who was later arrested along with the other removed candidates.

== Conduct ==
On the first day of the election the main daily newspaper Rahva Hääl told readers that "it would be extremely unwise to shirk elections... Only people's enemies stay at home on election day." Red Army troops were present in the polling stations in Tartu.

== Results ==
Party	Votes	%	Seats
Estonian Working People's Union	548,631	100.00	80
Total	548,631	100.00	80
Valid votes	548,631	92.83	
Invalid/blank votes	42,399	7.17	
Total votes	591,030	100.00	
Registered voters/turnout	703,059	84.07	
Source: Uudisleht

During the German occupation of Estonia during World War II the figures from the election were re-examined. Voter turnout was found to have been 80.1%, and the proportion of total votes for the Working People's Union was revised down to 91.6%. The distortions in the official figures were caused by officials artificially reducing the number of registered voters and counting invalid votes as valid ones, as well as assigning votes received by Rajur-Liivak to the Working People's Union. Additional evidence was uncovered that the Election Committee had forged 35,119 votes.

== See also ==
- List of members of the Supreme Soviet of the Estonian Soviet Socialist Republic, 1940–1947
- 1940 Latvian parliamentary election
- 1940 Lithuanian parliamentary election
