= Maksim Unt =

Estonian politician

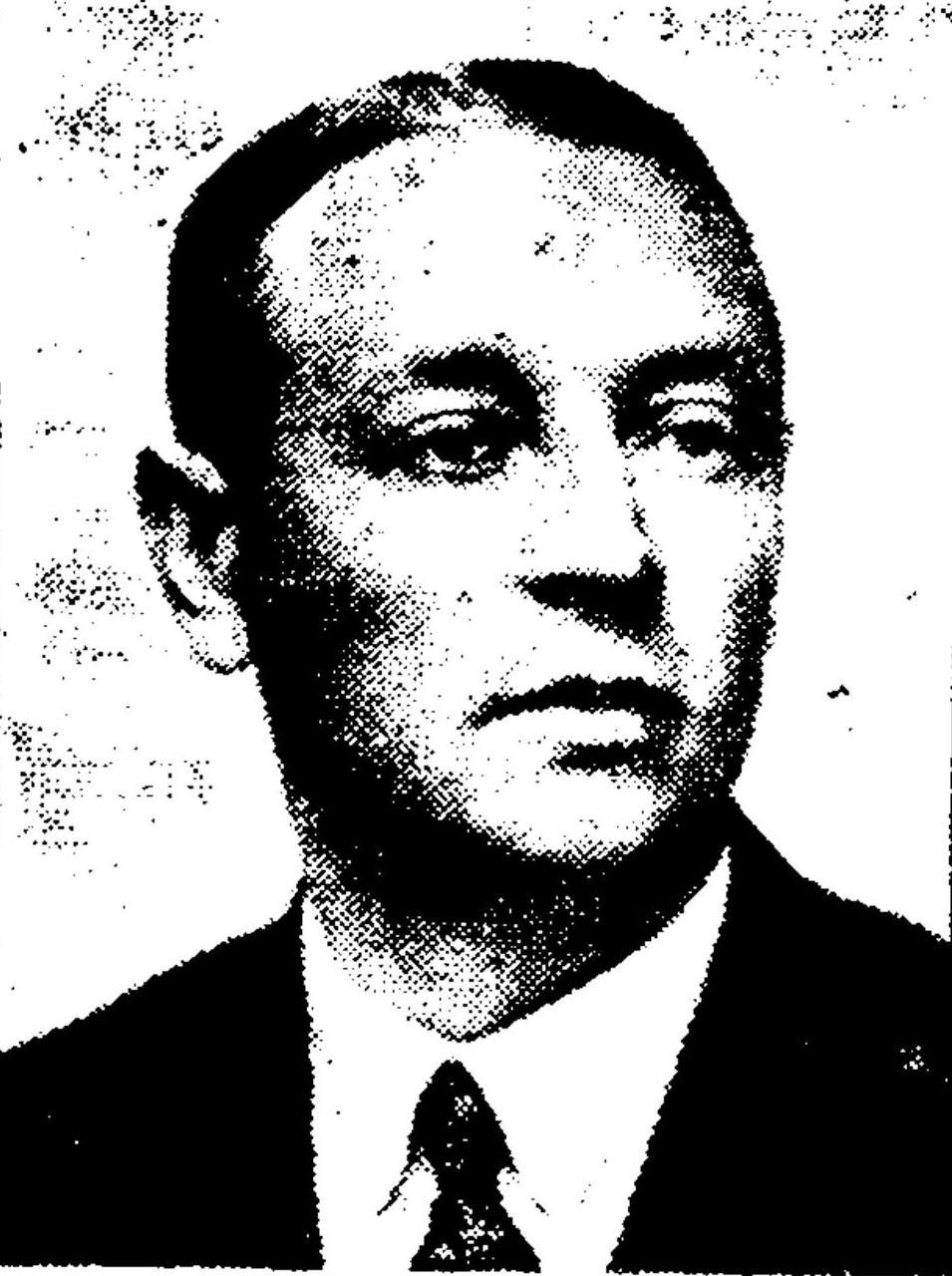
- Maksim Unt

Minister of the Interior of Estonia
- In office June 21, 1940 – August 5, 1940
- Preceded by: August Jürima

Member of Riigikogu
- In office 1938–1940
- In office 1932–1934
- In office May 6, 1931 – May 9, 1931

Personal details
- Born: January 20, 1898; Pärnu, Russian Empire
- Died: July 31, 1941 (aged 43); Moscow, Soviet Union
- Political party: Estonian Socialist Workers' Party; Estonian Social Democratic Workers' Party

Maksim Unt (also Maxim Unt and Maximilian Unt; 20 January 1898 in Pärnu, Estonia, then Russian Empire – 31 July 1941 in Moscow, Russia, then USSR) was an Estonian and Soviet politician.

== Biography ==
During the Russian Civil War, Unt worked to establish Bolshevik rule in Ukraine and Saratov. After being accused of looting and sentenced to death in absentia, he fled to the area occupied by the White Army under Anton Denikin, before returning to the newly independent Republic of Estonia in 1920.

Unt joined the Estonian Social Democratic Workers' Party, aligning himself with the party's left wing. He was a member of parliament (IV Riigikogu) from 6 May 1931, replacing Eduard Kink. On 9 May 1931, he resigned and was replaced by Villem Tammai. He was also elected a member of the V Riigikogu (1932–1934) and Riigivolikogu (Chamber of Deputies) of the VI Riigikogu (1938–1940).

Prior to the Soviet occupation of the Baltic states (1940), Unt was appointed by Andrei Zhdanov, the Soviet emissary to Estonia, to organize pro-Stalin demonstrations and strikes across the country, calling for the resignation of Prime Minister Jüri Uluots. After the Soviet occupation, Unt was appointed as Minister of the Interior in Johannes Vares' cabinet on 21 June 1940. After Vares' cabinet was replaced by the Council of People's Commissars of the Estonian SSR on 25 August 1940, he remained as People's Commissar of Labour.

In May 1941, Unt's defection to the White Army during the Civil War was discovered. He was arrested on 22 May 1941 by Soviet authorities and dismissed from his position as People's Commissar of Labour on 28 May. He was sentenced to 8 years of forced labor by the Supreme Court of the USSR on 8 July, but was instead executed by gunshot by the NKVD at the Kommunarka shooting ground in Moscow on 31 July.

Unt was rehabilitated by the USSR Prosecutor's Office on 3 December 1991.
