= August Hansen =

Estonian politician

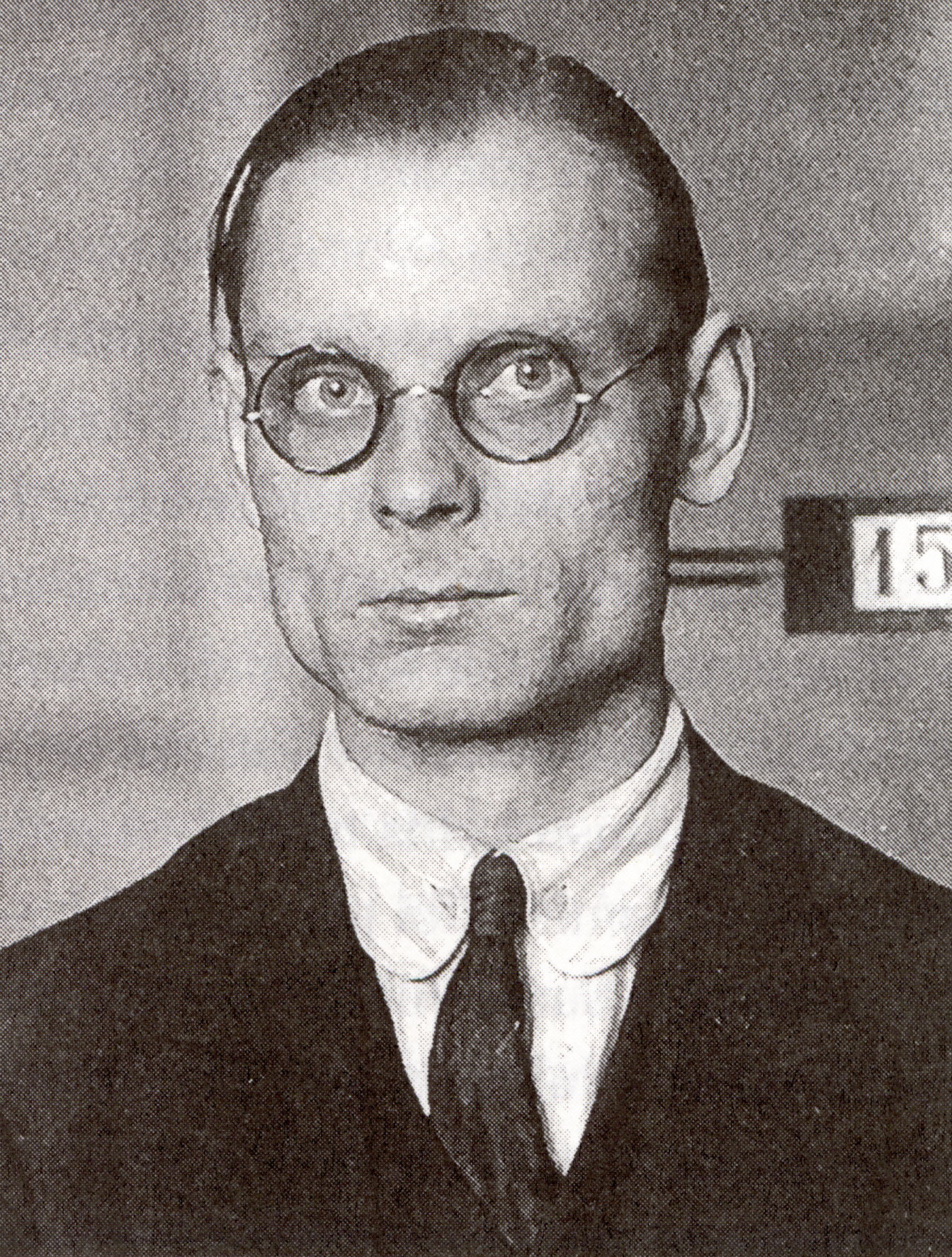
August Hansen

August Hansen (also Augustin Hansen; 23 April 1895 in Kaansoo – 12 March 1952) was an Estonian politician. He was a member of I Riigikogu.

== Early years ==
August Hansen was born into a peasant family in Kaansoo, Vastemõisa Parish, Viljandi County on April 23, 1895. He graduated from the Vastemõisa ministry school in 1910 and then worked as a student salesman at the consumers' association store in Viljandi.

In 1913, he moved to Tallinn, where he continued the political activities he started in Viljandi with the Socialist Revolutionary Party (SRP). He was elected as a member of the SRP to the Tallinn Council of Workers' and Soldiers' Deputies and later also a member of the TTSN Executive Committee.

== Revolutionary career ==
After the February Revolution of 1917, he and the left-wing members separated from the main part of the SRP and joined the movement aimed at seizing exclusive power led by the Tallinn Committee of the Estonian Section of the Russian Social Democratic Labour Party (Bolsheviks). He nonetheless remained a member of the SRP.

In 1918, after the occupation of Estonia by the forces of the German Empire, Hansen hid from the authorities. After the departure of the occupying forces in November 1918 and the restoration of Estonian self-governing bodies, he was invited to be the administrator of the Tallinn City Government.

In 1919, he worked on the Estonian Socialist Revolutionary Party newspaper Võitlus and also served as the representative of the Estonian Socialist Revolutionary Party in the Tallinn city government, where he worked as the head of the social welfare department. In 1920 he joined the Estonian Independent Socialist Workers' Party (EISTP) and was elected a member of the EISTP Central Committee. He was a member of the First Riigikogu from 1920 to 1923.

After communist organizations in Estonia were banned at the beginning of the Estonian War of Independence in December 1918, the communist party took advantage of legally operating socialist-oriented parties and trade unions to continue their activities through them. In 1922, Hansen became a member of the illegal Estonian Communist Party.

The legal left-wing organization of workers, the Estonian Union of Trade Unions, was reactivated in 1922, and the Temporary National Central Council of Workers' Unions was formed to convene it. Hansen was also a member of the board. Hansen opened the II Congress of Estonian Trade Unions in November 1922; Jaan Tomp was elected chairman of the central council of trade unions and Hansen was elected deputy chairman. In the 1923 election of Tallinn city councilors, he was elected as a Tallinn city councilor from the list of the United Labor Union.

On January 21, 1924, Hansen was arrested and convicted as part of the Trial of the 149 for anti-state activities. He was sentenced to life imprisonment, from which he was released on the basis of the Amnesty Act of 1938.

== Activities after release from prison ==
After his release, he worked in construction and as a salesman in the Leisi rural cooperative in Saaremaa. In the years 1939–1940, he worked as a store manager of the Tallinn Trade Union Consumers' Union.

After the Occupation of the Baltic states in 1940, he worked for a short time as the director of the Rahva Hääl and Kommunist publishing houses. In the years 1940-1943, he was the director of the Estonian National Shipping Company, operating from the Soviet Union. In the years 1943-1950 he served as the People's Commissar of Trade and Minister of Trade of the Estonian SSR, and then the chairman of the Central Union of Estonian Agricultural Cooperatives.

== Purge and rehabilitation ==
August Hansen was arrested in 1950 on charges of "treason to the (Soviet) fatherland" and executed on March 12, 1952. He was posthumously rehabilitated by the Soviets.
