= Tientsin Conference =

Series of conferences in China

The Tientsin Conference, beginning 10 November 1924, was a series of conferences between powerful Chinese warlords on the future government of China. It was hoped the result would be the reunification of the Beiyang government with the Kuomintang's rival government led by Sun Yat-sen in Canton and an end to the Warlord Era.

== Prelude ==
From 1916 to 1928, China was divided among former military cliques of the Beiyang Army and other regional factions. The southern provinces of China were notably against the Beiyang government in the north, having resisted the restoration of monarchy by Yuan Shikai and subsequent government in Beijing after his death. Sun Yat-sen along with other southern leaders attempted multiple times to form a rival government in Canton to resist the rule of the Beiyang warlords in what came to be known as the Constitutional Protection War. After succeeding in 1923, a one-party state under the doctrine of Dang Guo was established with the Soviet Union sponsoring the Kuomintang's new Whampoa Military Academy.

In the aftermath of the Beijing Coup that put an end to the Second Zhili–Fengtian War, a new balance of power was struck between the warlords of China. The Zhili clique's domination of the North China Plain was now largely reduced to the province and surrounding areas of Henan under Wu Peifu and, without Beijing, the Zhili clique was now no longer the internationally recognized government of China. The resulting power vacuum allowed the Fengtian clique under Zhang Zuolin and the Guominjun under Feng Yuxiang to greatly expand their power base.

== Conference ==
On 27 October 1924 Sun Yat-sen accepted an invitation by Feng Yuxiang to Beijing for national unification negotiations. On 10 November 1924, the same day negotiations began, Sun Yat-sen delivered a speech to suggest a gathering for a "national conference" for the Chinese people. It called for the end of warlord rule and the abolition of all unequal treaties.

The first conference began on 10 November 1924 and included Zhang Zuolin, Feng Yuxiang, and Lu Yongxiang. It was held in Tientsin at the home of Duan Qirui, former Premier of the Republic of China on four occasions between 1913 and 1918, leader of the Anhui clique, and arguably the most powerful man in China from 1916 to 1920 until his defeat and fall from power after the Zhili–Anhui War.

Zhang Zuolin unpredictably named Duan Qirui as the new Chief Executive of the nation on 24 November 1924. Duan's new government was grudgingly accepted by the Zhili clique because, without an army of his own, Duan was now considered a neutral choice. In addition, instead of "President" Duan was now called the "Chief Executive", implying that the position was temporary and therefore politically weak. Duan Qirui called on Sun Yat-sen and the Kuomintang in the south to restart negotiations towards national reunification. Sun demanded that the "unequal treaties" with foreign powers be repudiated and that a new national assembly be assembled. Bowing to public pressure, Duan promised a new national assembly in three months; however he could not unilaterally discard the "unequal treaties", since the foreign powers had made official recognition of Duan's regime contingent upon respecting these very treaties.

Negotiations fell apart after Sun Yat-sen died in Beijing of gallbladder cancer on 12 March 1925.

== Aftermath ==
In November 1925 the Anti-Fengtian War would break out with Feng Yuxiang fighting Zhang Zuolin along with his new ally and former enemy Wu Peifu. Duan Qirui, knowing that he was hopelessly dependent on Feng Yuxiang and Zhang Zuolin and that they did not get along, secretly tried to play one side against the other. In April 1926 the Guominjun deposed Duan, who was forced to flee to Zhang Zuolin for protection. Zhang, tired of his double-dealings, refused to restore him after re-capturing Beijing. Most of the Anhui clique had already sided with Zhang. Duan Qirui exiled himself to Tianjin and later moved to Shanghai where he died on November 2, 1936.

After Sun's death, a power struggle for leader of the Kuomintang would occur between Hu Hanmin, Wang Jingwei, Liao Zhongkai, and Chiang Kai-shek. Hu Hanmin would be discredited after his alleged involvement in the assassination of Liao Zhongkai and Chiang would ultimately triumph against Wang.

Very little came about from the negotiations. China would only nominally reunite and have its warlords partially subdued under Chiang Kai-shek in the aftermath of the Northern Expedition in 1928 and Central Plains War in 1930.

== See also ==
- Republic of China (1912–1949)
- History of the Republic of China
- Politics of the Republic of China

== Sources ==
- Gray, Jack (2002). Rebellions and Revolutions: China from the 1800s to 2000. New York: Oxford University Press. pp. 168–169. ISBN 978-0-19-870069-2.
- Yuxin, Ma (2010). Women journalists and feminism in China, 1898–1937. Oxford: Oxford University Press. p. 156. ISBN 978-1-60497-660-1.
