= Nigol Andresen =

Estonian politician

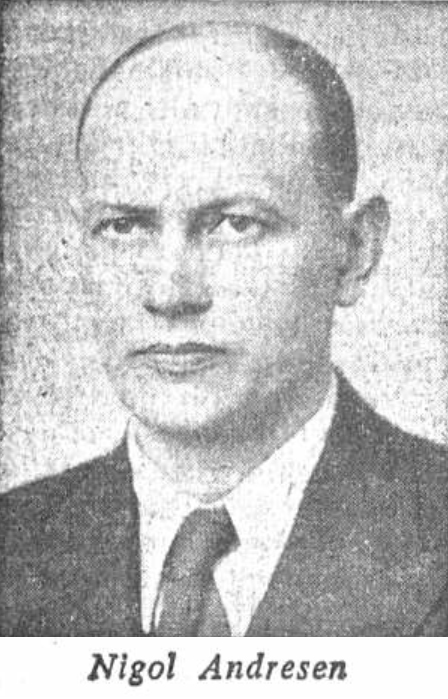
Nigol Andresen in 1941

Nigol Andresen (pen name, Ormi Arp; 2 October 1899 Haljala Parish, Wierland County – 24 February 1985 Tartu) was an Estonian and Soviet politician, writer, literary critic, and translator. He was a member of V Riigikogu.

He carried out underground communist activity in 1939 and 1940. In 1940 he was the minister of foreign affairs in the puppet government headed by Johannes Vares' cabinet. He fell into disgrace during a purge of the Estonian Communist Party in 1949.

Andresen's translations included an Estonian-language version of Karl Marx's Das Kapital. However, it was removed from bookstores and libraries when it was deemed to not agree with the approved Soviet version of the work.
