= Arnold Veimer =

Soviet Estonian politician, economist, and academic

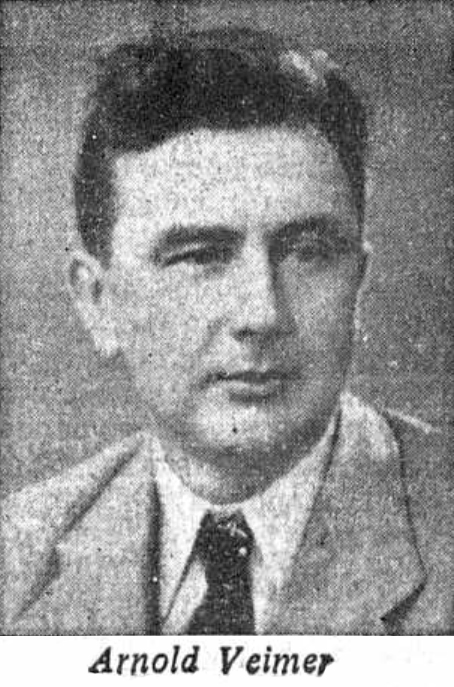

Chairman of the Council of Ministers of the Estonian SSR
- In office 22 September 1944 – 29 March 1951
- Preceded by: Oskar Sepre (acting)
- Succeeded by: Aleksei Müürisepp

Personal details
- Born: Arnold Veimer; 20 June 1903 Nehatu Parish, Governorate of Estonia, Russian Empire
- Died: 3 March 1977 (aged 73) Tallinn, Estonia
- Party: Communist Party of Estonia (1922–1940); Communist Party of the Soviet Union (1940–1977)
- Spouse: Nadezhda Tikhanova-Veimer
- Education: University of Tartu
- Profession: Economist
- Awards: Hero of Socialist Labour (1973)

Arnold Veimer (20 June 1903 – 3 March 1977) was a Soviet Estonian politician and economist.

== Biography ==
Veimer joined the Communist Party of Estonia (EKP) in 1922, and was given a lifetime sentence of forced labour in the trial of the 149 in 1924. In May 1938, he was released in a general amnesty.

After the Soviet occupation of Estonia in the summer of 1940, Veimer was elected a deputy to and chairman of the so-called People's Parliament in Estonia, which later became the Supreme Soviet of the Estonian SSR. In 1941 Veimer was elected to the Central Committee of the Communist Party of Estonia, now renamed the Communist Party of Estonia (bolsheviks) (EK(b)P). The same year, he graduated from the department of economics at the University of Tartu.

In 1944–1951, Veimer was Chairman of the Council of Ministers (until 1946 Chairman of the Council of People's Commissars) of the Estonian SSR. After being removed from this position, he was appointed director of the Institute of Economics and Law of the Academy of Sciences of the Estonian SSR. After the death of Joseph Stalin, Veimer returned to political work: in 1957–1965 he was Chairman of the Sovnarkhoz (Council of National Economy) of the Estonian SSR, and in 1965–1968 he was Deputy Chairman of the Council of Ministers of the Estonian SSR. He later served as President of the Academy of Sciences of the Estonian SSR in 1968–1973.
