= Mart Kangur (politician) =

Estonian communist

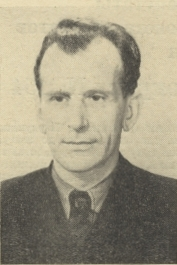
Kangur in 1948

Mart Kangur (also Vladimir Kangur; born 7 February 1903 Kohila Parish, Harrien County – 14 July 1998, Tallinn) was an Estonian politician, a member of the Communist Party of Estonia. He was a member of II Riigikogu, representing the Workers' United Front. On 29 February, he resigned his position and he was replaced by Aleksander Erdman.
