= Georg Abels =

Estonian politician

Georg Abels (2 October 1898 Pärnu – 30 October 1967 Tallinn) was an Estonian politician. He was a member of the II Riigikogu.

He was not originally elected as a member of II Riigikogu, but he become a member to subsistute Jaan Tomp.

== Acknowldgements ==
- Order of Lenin (1950)
- 1964 Meritorious Cultural Figure of the Estonian SSR (1964)
