= Jaan Tomp =

Estonian politician (1894–1924)

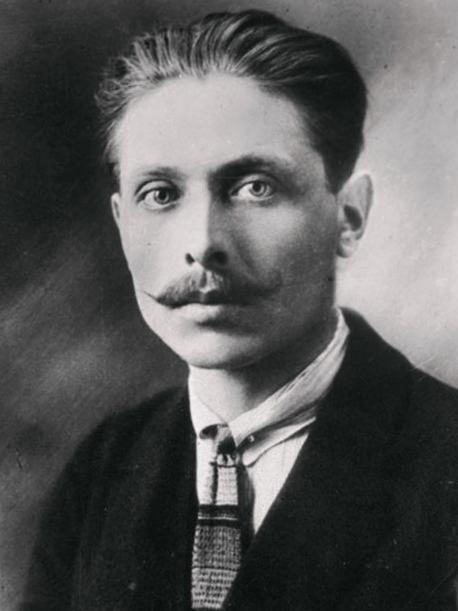

Jaan Tomp (10 September 1894 in Tuhalaane Parish (now Mulgi Parish), Kreis Fellin – 14 November 1924 in Tallinn) was an Estonian communist, politician, and member of the Riigikogu. He began his legislative career in 1922, when he replaced Adolf Leevald in the I Riigikogu. The chairman of the Central Council of the Workers' Unions of Estonia (Estonian: Eestimaa Töölisühingute Üldliidu Kesknõukogu), he was sentenced to death at the Trial of the 149.

Following his execution, some Soviet factories and clubs were named after Tomp. During the Soviet era, Tallinn's House of the Blackheads was a "culture palace" initially named after Jaan Tomp (and later renamed after the communist Jaan Kreuks).
