= Paul Keerdo =

Estonian politician (1891–1950)

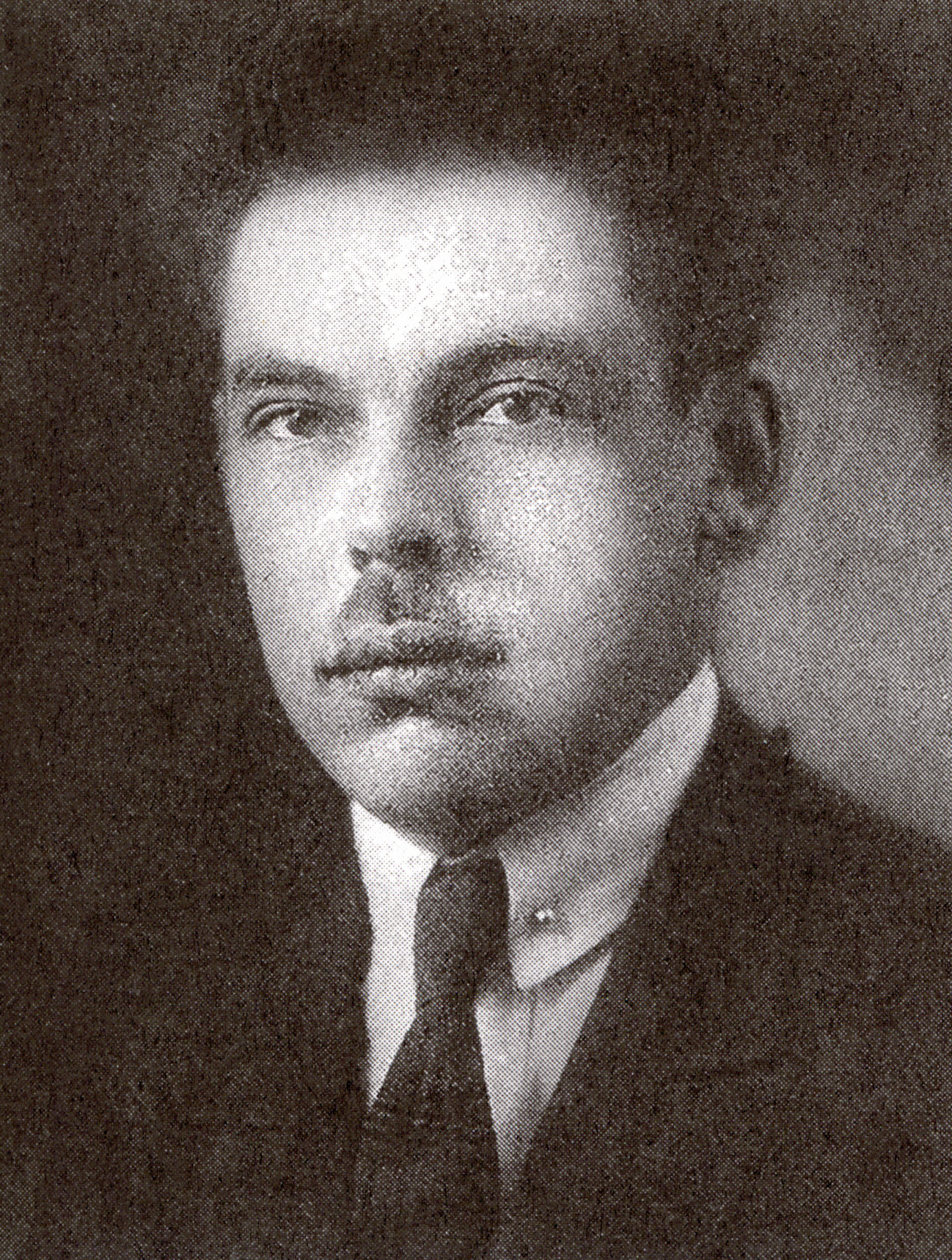
Harald-Paul Keerdo

Paul Harald Keerdo (4 April 1891 Tartu – 6 January 1950 Tallinn) was an Estonian communist politician and writer. He was a member of I Riigikogu.
