= 1975 in Estonia =

- Decades: 1950s; 1960s; 1970s; 1980s; 1990s
- See also: Other events of 1975; Timeline of Estonian history

This article lists events that occurred during 1975 in Estonia.

== Events ==
- Population: 299,000.

== Births ==
- 4 June – Karin Tammemägi, politician
- 22 June – Urmas Reinsalu, politician
- 12 July – Kristen Michal, politician
- 10 November – Markko Märtin, rally driver
- 25 November - Kristina Kallasmaa, Interior Creator
- 5 December – Kaimo Kuusk, diplomat and foreign intelligence officer

== Deaths ==
- 18 October – Otto Lellep, inventor and metallurgical engineer
