= 1969 in Estonia =

- Decades: 1940s; 1950s; 1960s; 1970s; 1980s
- See also: Other events of 1969; Timeline of Estonian history

This article lists events that occurred during 1969 in Estonia.

== Incumbents ==
Johannes Käbin

== Events ==
- Pirita Velodrome was opened.

== Births ==
- 18 January – Mihkel Raud, writer, music artist, and actor
- 30 December – Kersti Kaljulaid, politician, 5th President of Estonia

== Deaths ==
- 25 October – Ellinor Aiki, painter (b. 1893)
