= 1978 in Estonia =

- Decades: 1950s; 1960s; 1970s; 1980s; 1990s
- See also: Other events of 1978; Timeline of Estonian history

This article lists events that occurred during 1978 in Estonia.

== Events ==
- 28 September – one of the last Forest Brother guerilla movement fighter August Sabbe was discovered and killed in Estonia.

== Births ==
- 12 February – Silver Meikar, Estonian politician
- 7 October – Lauri Leis, Estonian triple jumper
- 1 December – Ott Lumi, Estonian politician

== Deaths ==
- 28 September – August Sabbe
