= 1962 in Estonia =

- Decades: 1940s; 1950s; 1960s; 1970s; 1980s
- See also: Other events of 1962; Timeline of Estonian history

This article lists events that occurred during 1962 in Estonia.

== Events ==
- Kalev Sports Hall built.

== Births ==
- 7 January – Kiiri Tamm, actress
- 25 May – Sulev Vare, politician
- 11 June – Erika Salumäe, cyclist, Olympic winner in 1988 and 1992

== Deaths ==
- 27 June – Paul Viiding, poet, author and literary critic (b. 1904)
