= Kreisman =

Kreisman is a surname. Notable people with the surname include:

- Kaja Kreisman (born 1968), Estonian politician
- Maksim Kreisman (born 1976), Russian footballer
- Steven Douglas Kreisman (1938–1993), American musician
