= 1968 in Estonia =

- Decades: 1940s; 1950s; 1960s; 1970s; 1980s
- See also: Other events of 1968; Timeline of Estonian history

This article lists events that occurred during 1968 in Estonia.

== Events ==
- 1st number of Estonian Soviet Encyclopedia was published.

== Births ==
- 4 February – Marko Matvere, actor and singer
- 20 March – Kaja Kreisman, politician

== Deaths ==
- 2 December – Adamson-Eric, artist (b. 1902)
