= 1982 in Estonia =

- Decades: 1960s; 1970s; 1980s; 1990s; 2000s
- See also: Other events of 1982; Timeline of Estonian history

This article lists events that occurred during 1982 in Estonia.

== Events ==
- Construction of Muuga Harbour was started.
- Tartu University celebrated its 350th anniversary.

== Births ==
- December 26 – Kristjan Kõljalg, politician
