= 1965 in Estonia =

- Decades: 1940s; 1950s; 1960s; 1970s; 1980s
- See also: Other events of 1965; Timeline of Estonian history

This article lists events that occurred during 1965 in Estonia.

== Events ==
- July 6 – trolleybuses begin operating in Tallinn.
- Helsinki-Tallinn ferry resumes operation.
- New Tallinn Bus Station was built.

== Births ==
- 29 January – Robert Antropov, politician
- 11 October – Ivo Uukkivi, actor, singer and producer
- 28 December – Allar Levandi, Nordic combined skier
