= Paide Church =

Church building in Estonia

Coordinates: 58.8876°N 25.5702°E

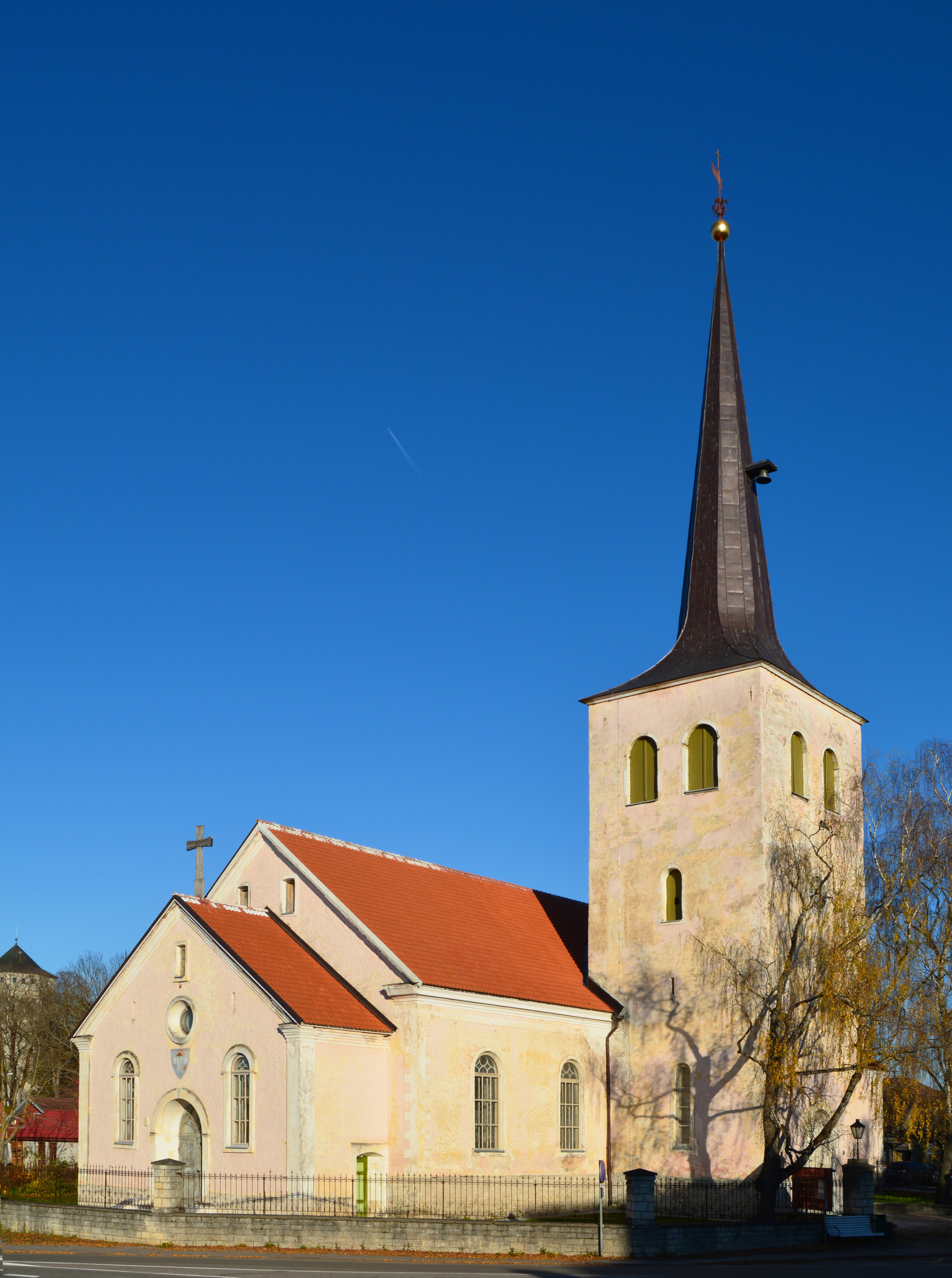
Paide Church

Paide Holy Cross Church (Estonian: Paide Püha Risti kirik, German: Kirche zum Heiligen Kreuz) is a Lutheran church in Paide, Estonia.

Church existed in Paide in medieval times, but was destroyed in 1573 during the siege of Weissenstein (old name for Paide). It was replaced with a wooden church, which was burnt down by Russian forces in 1703 during the Great Northern War.

In the 1730s a small church was erected, replaced by a stone church built between 1767 and 1786. The church tower was built exceptionally to the southern side of the church to bond the church with the market square into a single architectural ensemble.

There was a fire in the church on May 10, 1845. A large fundraising was set up to pay for restoration works.

During 1909–1910 the church underwent a larger reconstruction.
