= 1970 in Estonia =

- Decades: 1950s; 1960s; 1970s; 1980s; 1990s
- See also: Other events of 1970; Timeline of Estonian history

This article lists events that occurred during 1970 in Estonia.

== Events ==
- Introduction of universal secondary education. The result was rapid decline of the quality of education.

== Births ==
- 2 August – Innar Mäesalu, politician
