= 1971 in Estonia =

- Decades: 1950s; 1960s; 1970s; 1980s; 1990s
- See also: Other events of 1971; Timeline of Estonian history

This article lists events that occurred during 1971 in Estonia.

== Incumbents ==
- Chairman of the Presidium of the Supreme Soviet - Artur Vader

== Events ==
- Lahemaa National Park was established.

== Births ==
- 16 November – Annely Peebo, Estonian mezzo-soprano and host of Eurovision Song Contest 2002
