= 1977 in Estonia =

- Decades: 1950s; 1960s; 1970s; 1980s; 1990s
- See also: Other events of 1977; Timeline of Estonian history

This article lists events that occurred during 1977 in Estonia.

== Events ==
- Development of Tallinn Lasnamäe area begins.

== Births ==
- 23 February – Kristina Šmigun-Vähi, skier
- 27 September – Andrus Värnik, javelin thrower
- 8 December – Maarja Jakobson, actress
