= 1966 in Estonia =

- Decades: 1940s; 1950s; 1960s; 1970s; 1980s
- See also: Other events of 1966; Timeline of Estonian history

This following events occurred in Estonia in the year 1966.

== Events ==
- August 2 – Tallinn Old Town Conservation Area was established.

== Births ==
- 23 April – Lembit Oll, chess player
- 27 August – Juhan Parts, politician

== Deaths ==
- 19 December – Betty Kuuskemaa, actress (b. 1879)
