= Kadri Mälk =

Estonian artist (1958–2023)

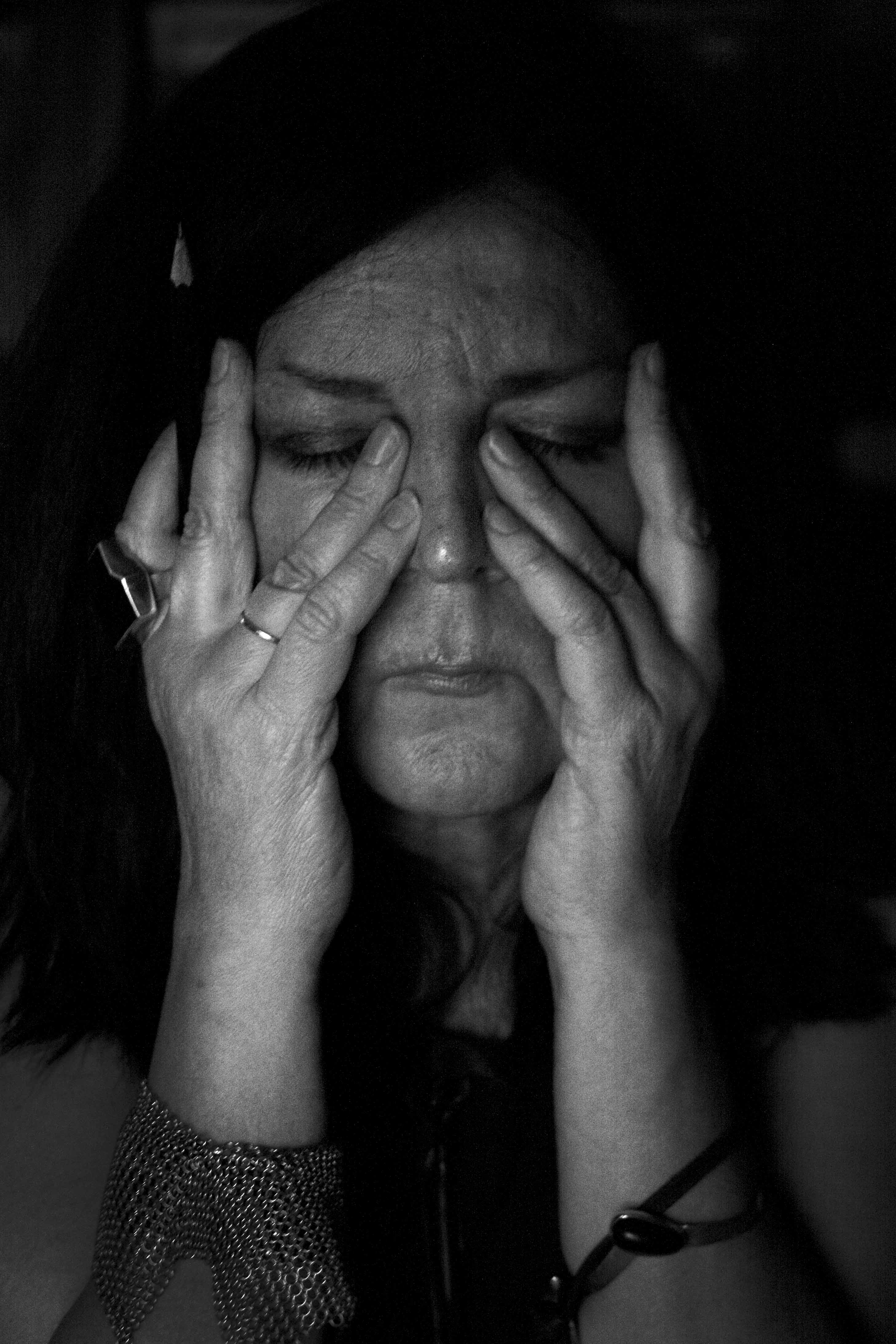
- Mälk in 2014
- Born: Kadri Sõerd; 27 January 1958; Tallinn, then part of Estonian SSR, Soviet Union
- Died: 1 January 2023 (aged 64); Tallinn, Estonia
- Education: Tartu Art School, Estonian Academy of Arts, Lahti Design Institute in Finland
- Occupations: artist, jewellery designer
- Spouse(s): married 3 times, final:Mati Sirkel
- Awards: see Awards

Kadri Mälk (née Kadri Sõerd; 27 January 1958 – 1 January 2023) was an Estonian artist and jewellery designer.

== Life and career ==
Mälk was born on 27 January 1958 in Tallinn and began her studies at the Tartu Art School in 1977 and graduated from the Estonian Academy of Arts in 1986, studying under professor Leili Kuldkepp. Between 1986 and 1993, Mälk worked as a freelance artist. In 1993, she enrolled at the Lahti Design Institute in Finland, studying gemmology under the direction of Esko Timonen and completed her studies at Bernd Munsteiner's lapidary studio in Germany. Mälk was assigned to the Estonian Academy of Arts from 1989 and was also a professor in the jewellery department at the school from 1996.

Mälk had both solo and group exhibitions throughout the world. Her jewellery designs have been displayed in various museums and exhibitions in: Estonia, Latvia, Lithuania, Germany, Belgium, Denmark, Finland, the United States, South Korea, Russia, Slovakia, France, Japan, the United Kingdom, Sweden, Spain and Norway.

Mälk was married three times. Her final husband was writer and translator Mati Sirkel.

Mälk died on 1 January 2023 in Tallinn, 26 days before her 65th birthday.

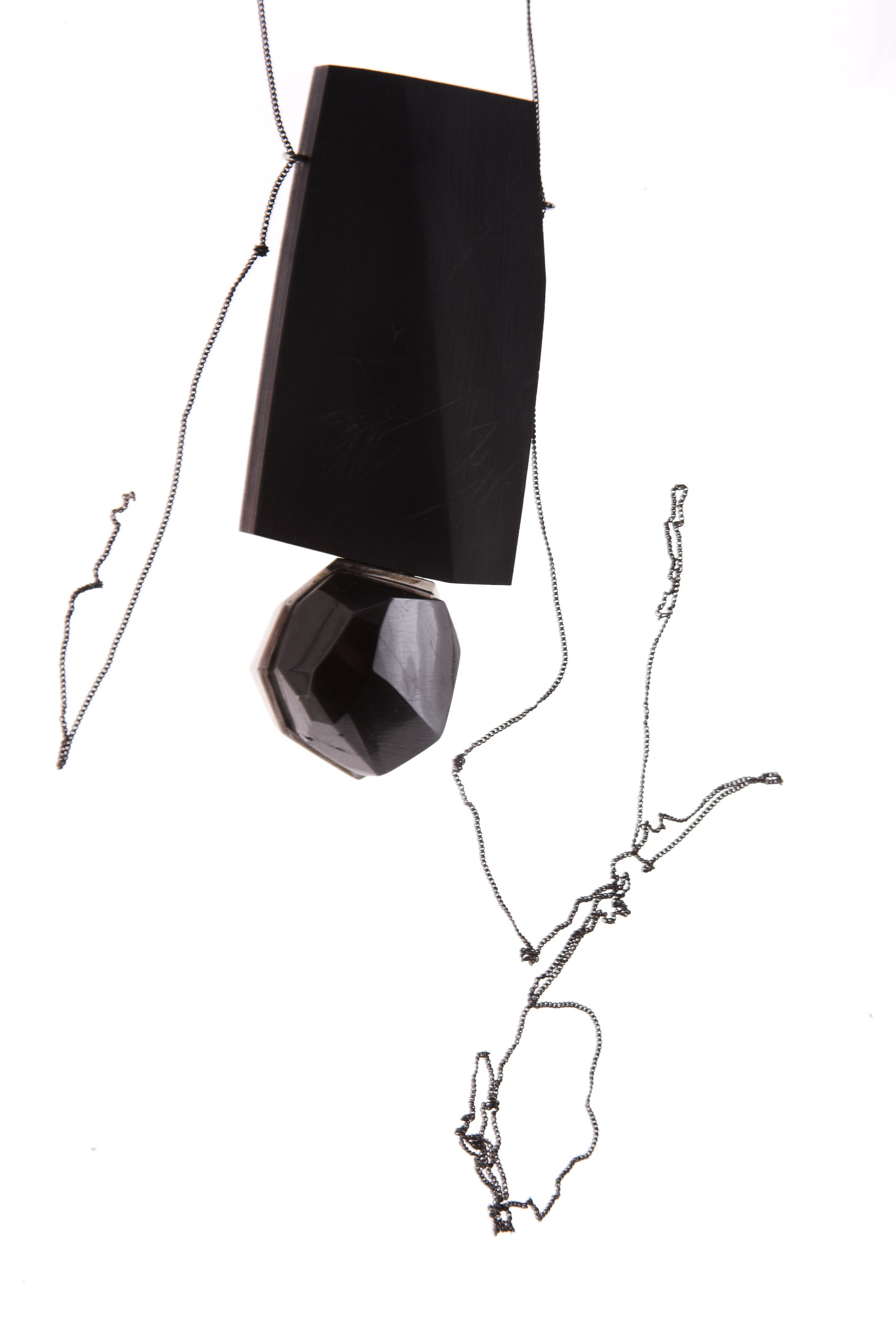
Amnesia, 2010

== Awards ==
- 2017 Order of the White Star, V Class
- 1998 Estonian State Cultural Award
- 1997 Estonian Culture Capital Art Prize of the Year
- 1997 Award of Excellence, Shippo Conference, Tokyo, Japan
- 1995 Estfem, Estonian Woman prize
- 1994 The Kristjan Raud Annual Art Prize
- 1992 PRIX ARTICA Honourable Mention, Finland
- 1988 Grand Prix at the IV Applied Art Triennial, Estonia
- 1987 Young Artisan Prize of the Year, Estonia
