= 1980 in Estonia =

- Decades: 1960s; 1970s; 1980s; 1990s; 2000s
- See also: Other events of 1980; Timeline of Estonian history

This article lists events that occurred during 1980 in Estonia.

== Events ==
- 20-30 July – 1980 Summer Olympics sailing events take place at the new Olympic Yachting Centre in Tallinn.
- Youth riots in the capital of the Soviet Republic of Estonia were quickly forced down.
- October – Letter of 40 intellectuals.

== Births ==
- 18 April – Priit Võigemast, Estonian actor
- 27 October – Tanel Padar, Estonian singer
- 24 December – Maarja-Liis Ilus, Estonian singer
