= 1979 in Estonia =

- Decades: 1950s; 1960s; 1970s; 1980s; 1990s
- See also: Other events of 1979; Timeline of Estonian history

This article lists events that occurred during 1979 in Estonia.

== Events ==
- Baltic Appeal was revealed.
- Karula Landscape Protection Area (nowadays Karula National Park) was established.

== Births ==
- 6 November – Gerli Padar, Estonian singer and TV host
