= 1974 in Estonia =

- Decades: 1950s; 1960s; 1970s; 1980s; 1990s
- See also: Other events of 1974; Timeline of Estonian history

This article lists events that occurred during 1974 in Estonia.

== Events ==
- First Saaremaa Rally took place.
- Construction works of Hotel Olümpia were started (ended in 1980).

== Births ==
- 14 May – Anu Välba, Estonian TV and radio host
