= Mati Sirkel =

Estonian translator and writer

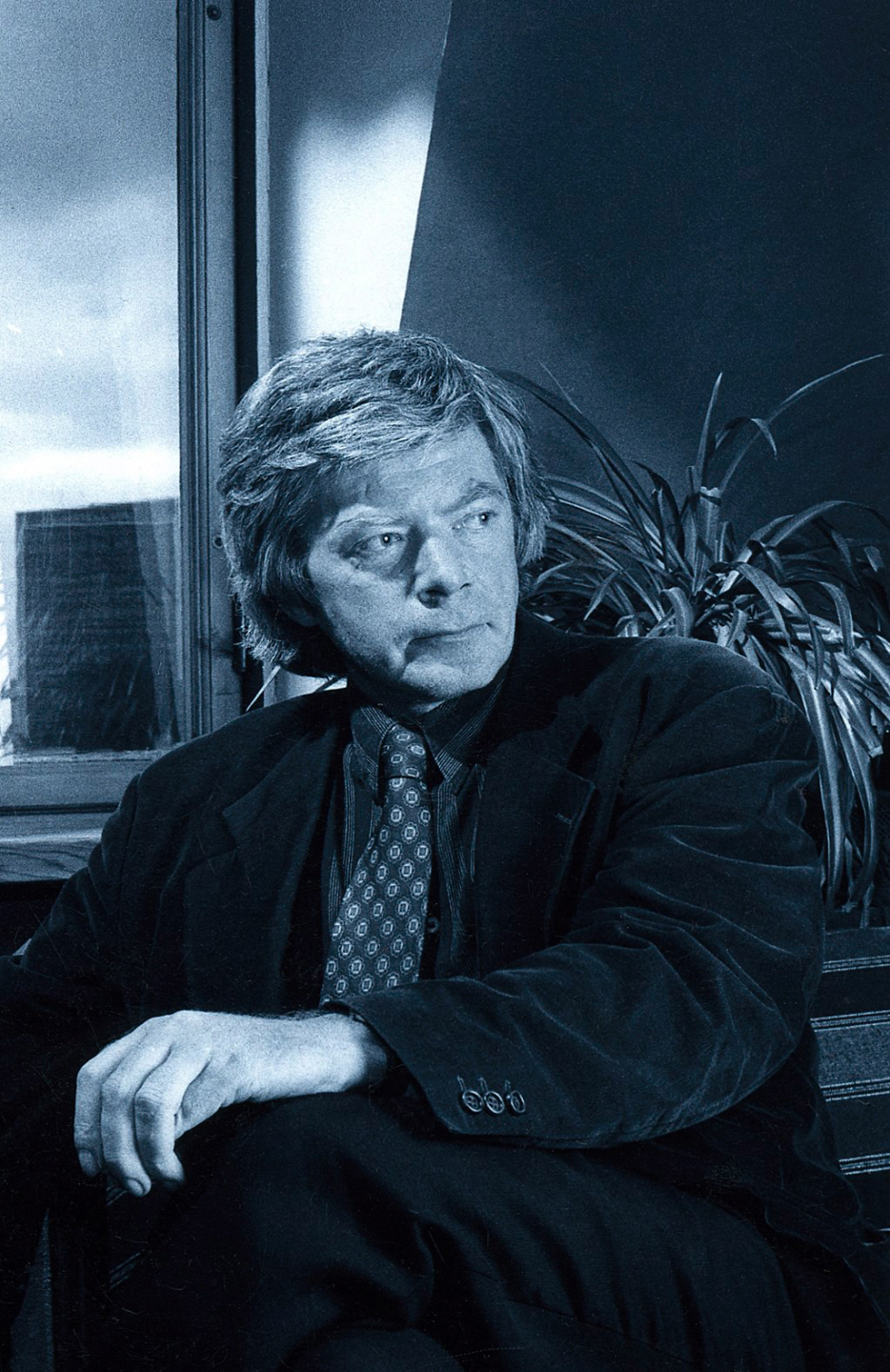
Mati Sirkel

Mati Sirkel (born 12 October 1949) is an Estonian translator and writer.

== Career ==
He was born in Paide. In 1972, he graduated from Tartu State University with degrees in literary theory and German philology. From 1972 until 1975, he worked as a junior researcher at the Institute of Language and Literature. Beginning in 1975, he worked for a year at the Estonian Literary Museum. From 1976 until 1979, he worked at the publishing house Perioodika. Since 1982, he has been a professional translator. In 1989, he joined the Estonian Writers' Union; in 1990, he became the secretary of the union, and from 1995 until 2004, the chairman of the board.

In October 1980, Sirkel was a signatory of the Letter of 40 Intellectuals, a public letter in which forty prominent Estonian intellectuals defended the Estonian language and protested the Russification policies of the Kremlin in Estonia. The signatories also expressed their unease against Republic-level government in harshly dealing with youth protests in Tallinn that were sparked a week earlier due to the banning of a public performance of the punk rock band Propeller.

Sirkel has translated almost 50 works from German, English, Modern Greek, Swedish and Dutch. Notable translations have been works by Elias Canetti, Peter Handke, Alfred Kubin, Günter Grass, Rainer Maria Rilke, Fritz von Herzmanovsky-Orlando, Thomas Bernhard, Robert Musil, Friedrich Hölderlin, Ilse Aichinger, and Elfriede Gerstl. He has translated all the literary texts of Franz Kafka into Estonian.

In the early 1980s, he translated a large number of Carl Michael Bellman's songs from Swedish, and together with Ott Arder, he translated Bellman's stories into Fredman's Epistles & Songs, as well as wrote a foreword to the book. In addition, Sirkel has also translated scientific literature, including Johan Huizinga's The Task of Cultural History. A Selection of Articles, Essays, Speeches.

== Personal life ==
Sirkel was married to artist Kadri Mälk until her death in 2023.

== Selected works ==
- Orva-aastad (2004)
- Uued orva-aastad (2009)
- Vanad vastuseta küsimused (2014)
- Kuhu me siis läheme? – Eks ikka koju (2016)

== Awards ==
- Order of the White Star, V Class (2001)
- Estonian Cultural Endowment Annual Literature Award (2006)
- Order of the National Coat of Arms, IV Class (2006) class
- Austrian Decoration for Science and Art (2009)
- Friedrich-Gundolf-Preis (2013)
- Cultural Prize of the Republic of Estonia (2014)
