= 1963 in Estonia =

- Decades: 1940s; 1950s; 1960s; 1970s; 1980s
- See also: Other events of 1963; Timeline of Estonian history

This article lists events that occurred during 1963 in Estonia.

== Events ==
- Estonian Sports Museum was established.

== Births ==
- 29 May – Tiit Arge, politician
