= Polysius =

Thyssenkrupp Polysius GmbH
- Industry: Cement industry
- Founded: 1859 in Dessau, Germany
- Founder: Gottfried Polysius
- Headquarters: Neubeckum, Germany
- Area served: Worldwide
- Key people: Pablo Hofelich (CEO); Frank Ruoss (CSO); Alexander Just (CFO)
- Products: polysius® activated clay; polysius® pure oxyfuel; dopol®; mammut® Single-Shaft Hammer Crusher#; polab® AMT; polab® Linea; polab® APM; polab® Cal; polcid®; polflame®; polguide kiln drive system; polro® 2-support kiln; polycom® high pressure grinding roll; polysius® Belt Conveyor; polysius® booster mill; polytrack®; prepol® SC; quadropol® vertical roller mill; sepol® high efficiency separator; titan® Double-Shaft Hammer Crusher; 3-support kiln
- Revenue: EUR 2 billion
- Number of employees: 4,000
- Parent: ThyssenKrupp
- Website: www.thyssenkrupp-polysius.com

Thyssenkrupp Polysius GmbH (thyssenkrupp Polysius GmbH) is a global industrial company specializing in the manufacture and sale of plants and machinery for the cement and ore industry. In 2023, Thyssenkrupp Polysius GmbH was integrated into the newly created Decarbon Technologies segment of ThyssenKrupp.

The company employs around 4000 people and operates in 28 sites worldwide, including in countries such as France, England, the US, Mexico, Brazil, Peru, Singapore, China, and Vietnam.

== History ==
=== Foundation and first achievements ===
The company was founded in Dessau: around Easter 1859, master locksmith Gottfried Polysius opened a workshop in Dessau with an apprentice and laid the foundations for today's company with his locksmith's shop and the manufacture of safes. On May 23, 1870, he founded G. Polysius iron foundery and engineering factory, which established itself in the then-young building materials industry with self-designed and powerful mills. Besides money cabinets, the company also produced drains and vibrating screens.

In addition to agricultural machinery, Polysius also produced grain mills, brewery and distillery equipment. He was particularly involved in the up-and-coming beet sugar industry. From then on, Polysius specialized in crushing and processing machines. After Polysius' death, his sons Otto and Max Polysius successfully continued the company. The construction of cement plants became particularly important. In 1893, the company exhibited at the World's Fair in Chicago. 1898 saw the design and manufacture of the first rotary cement kiln in Europe. This was followed in 1912 by the construction of the Jesarbruch plant near Nienburg (Saale) for the Sächsisch-Thüringische Portland-Cement-Fabrik Prüssing & Co. KGaA.

In the late 1920s, Otto Lellep invented the LEPOL process. This revolutionised conventional cement production, significantly improving the burning process in the rotary kiln and reducing fuel consumption by a third.

=== During World War II ===
The president of ThyssenKrupp AG, Alfried Krupp von Bohlen und Halbach, was tried and convicted for the use of slave labor and crimes against humanity. Krupp had insisted on the use of forced labour even when the German military suggested that some work should be performed by free German workers for security reasons.

=== Development after the war ===
After the end of the Second World War, Polysius started up again in Dessau in 1946. At the same time, Bernd Helming and Curt Prüssing, a son-in-law of Max Polysius, founded Westpol GmbH in Neubeckum, which was renamed Polysius GmbH three years later. The company became the driving force behind the revival of Polysius' business in the west. The new office building was designed that the offices could easily be converted into apartments if the up-and-coming company failed. Prüssing and Bernd Helming remained on the Management Board even after the later conversion of the GmbH into a stock corporation. The Dessau factory was expropriated by the Russian administration in 1946 and later renamed VEB Cement plant construction. Just 10 years after the new start, Polysius employed 600 people in Germany and 100 abroad.

In 1951, the first complete cement plant was delivered to Syria. In order to remain competitive, the company was forced to install ever larger plants. As the value of individual orders increased, the total number of orders placed worldwide steadily decreased. In addition, the demand for complete plants resulted in an unusually high capital commitment and entailed a variety of technological and commercial risks.

Former thyssenkrupp logo till 2015

The owners of Polysius realized that the financial demands on the company would sooner or later exceed the possibilities of a family business and therefore brought in the Essen-based Fried. Krupp GmbH as a shareholder.

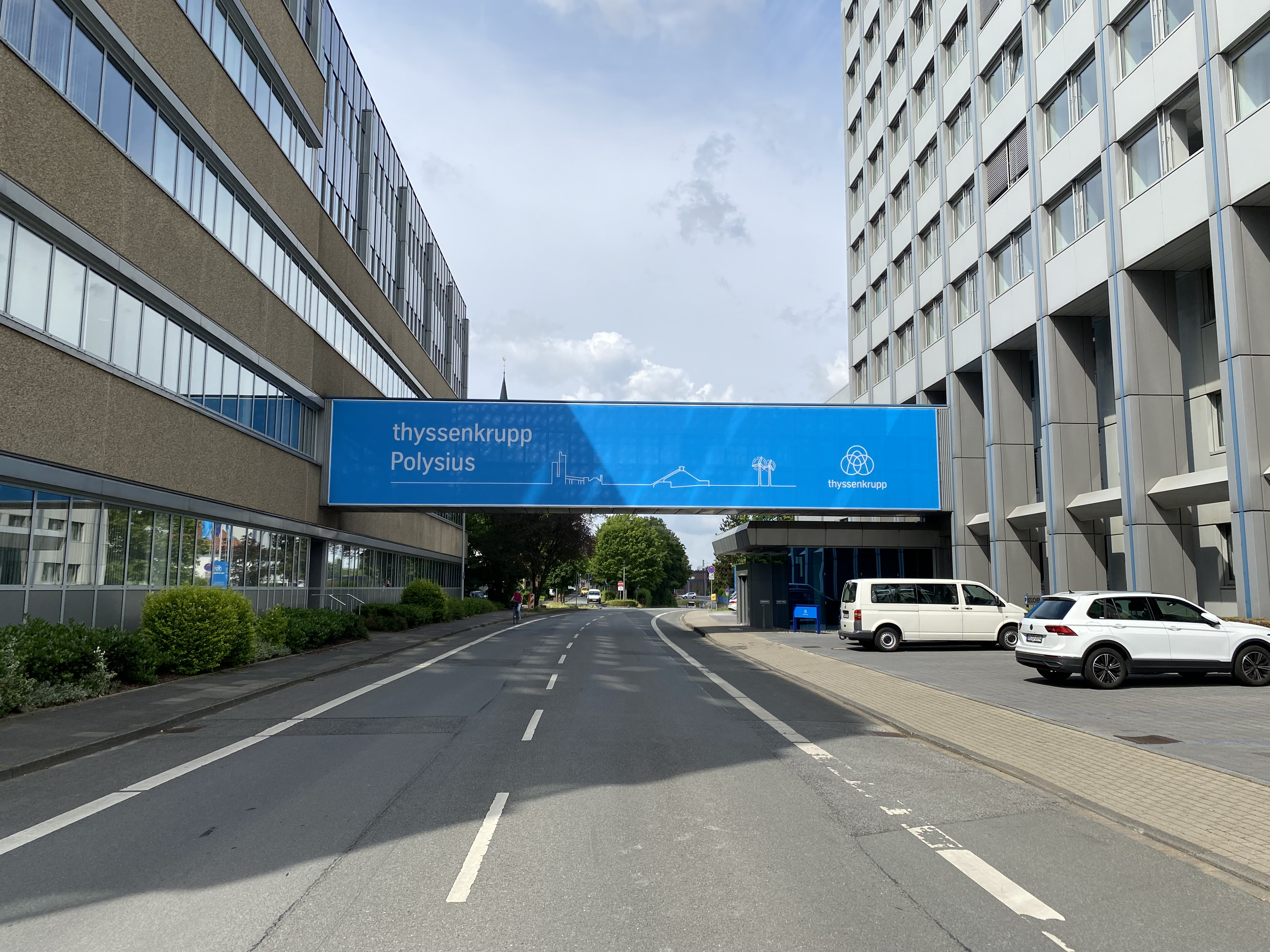
Head office of thyssenkrupp Polysius GmbH in Neubeckum

In 1971, Essener Fried. Krupp GmbH acquired a majority shareholding in Polysius.

=== Integration into the ThyssenKrupp Group ===
In 1992, Krupp Polysius was integrated into the Krupp Plant engineering division - a group structure of Fried. Krupp AG Hoesch-Krupp. In 1999, 140 years after the company was founded, it merged with the Thyssen Group to form ThyssenKrupp in what was one of Germany's first hostile takeovers. Polysius is now part of the international ThyssenKrupp Technologies division.

Acquisitions strengthened Polysius in the lime kiln (Maerz AG in Zurich) and services (AC Equipment Corp., USA) sectors. In October 2009, the 150th anniversary of the company was celebrated with three days of festivities in Neubeckum.

=== Business Area: thyssenkrupp Industrial Solutions ===
In 2014, the two previously independent plant engineering companies thyssenkrupp Uhde and Thyssenkrupp Resource Technologies merged to form thyssenkrupp Industrial Solutions, headquartered in Essen. The company offers chemical, refinery and industrial plants as well as associated services such as planning, maintenance and training.

Yamama Saudi Cement cement plant in Saudi Arabia

As of May 31, 2023, the business area was dissolved, which led to the renaming of thyssenkrupp Industrial Solutions GmbH into two independent companies: thyssenkrupp Polysius GmbH and thyssenkrupp Uhde GmbH.

=== New business segment: Decarbon Technologies ===
In September 2023, the thyssenkrupp Polysius, thyssenkrupp Uhde, thyssenkrupp Rothe Erde (Bearings business unit) and thyssenkrupp Nucera business units were merged under the umbrella of the newly created Decarbon Technologies segment.

== Business area ==
The main field of activity of thyssenkrupp Polysius GmbH is the cement industry. The company offers both individual machines and complete plants for cement production. In addition, thyssenkrupp Polysius provides services along the entire life cycle of cement plants, including inspections, maintenance and the supply of innovative OEM spare parts. With a total of 20 service offices in 18 countries and 5 service centers, the company has a global presence.

In addition to the cement industry, thyssenkrupp Polysius also operates in other sectors:

- Lime industry: PFR/ HPS shaft kilns for lime plants
- Mining industry: crushers & screening plants
