= 1981 in Estonia =

- Decades: 1960s; 1970s; 1980s; 1990s; 2000s
- See also: Other events of 1981; Timeline of Estonian history

This article lists events that occurred during 1981 in Estonia.

== Events ==
- Estonian Philharmonic Chamber Choir was established.

== Births ==
- 21 January – Rain Ottis, cybersecurity researcher and educator
- 26 May – Eda-Ines Etti, singer and TV host
- 1 August – Vaiko Eplik, singer

== Deaths ==
- 27 March – Jüri Kukk, Estonian freedom fighter
