= 1967 in Estonia =

- Decades: 1940s; 1950s; 1960s; 1970s; 1980s
- See also: Other events of 1967; Timeline of Estonian history

This article lists events that occurred during 1967 in Estonia.

== Events ==
- Gradual introduction of five-day workweek was finished (started in 1966).
