= Paide =

Town in Estonia

- Town
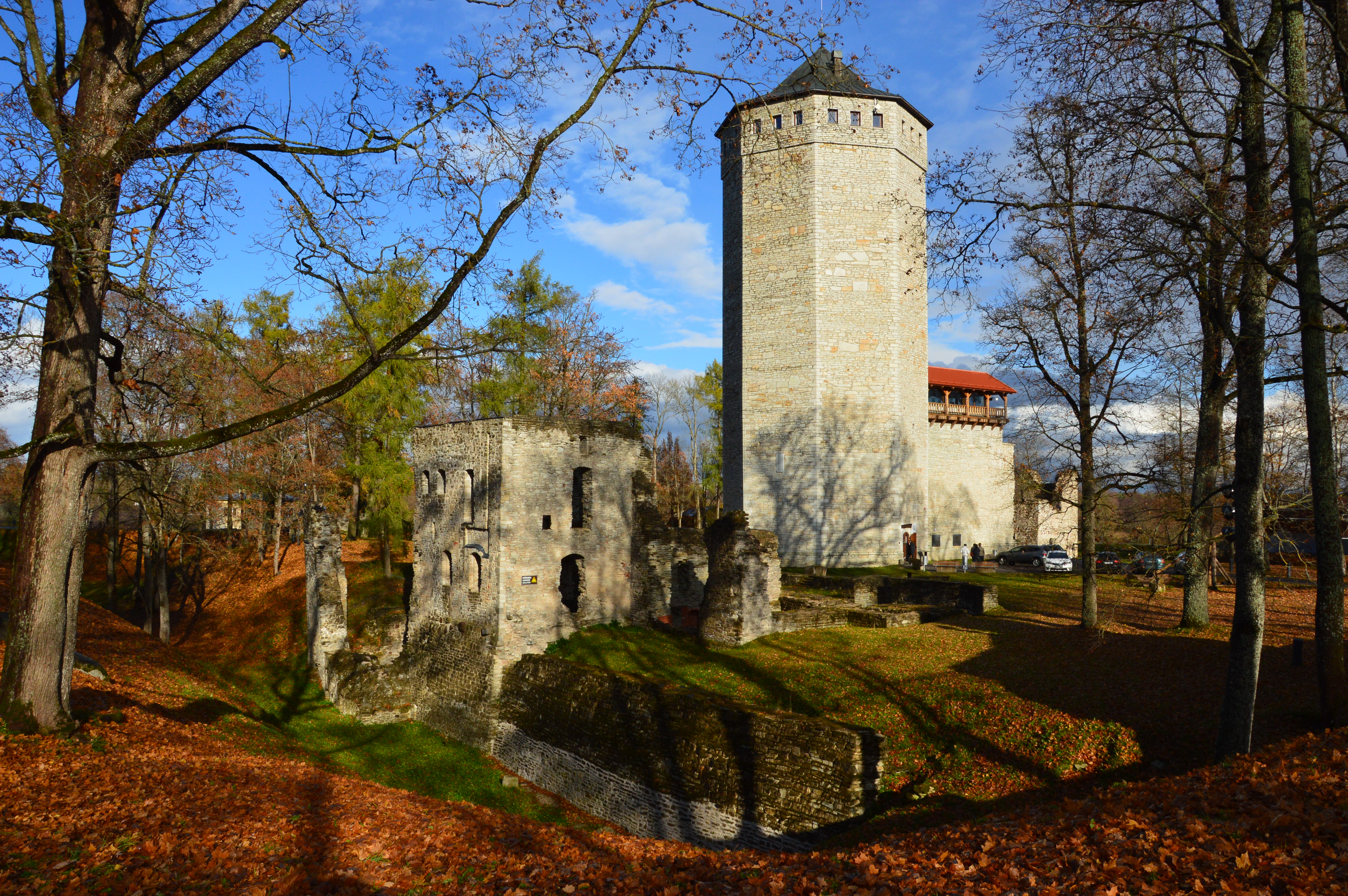
- Paide castle

- Location in Estonia
- Coordinates: 58°53′00″N 25°33′26″E
- Country: Estonia
- County: Järva County
- Municipality: Paide

Area
  - Total: 10.036 km^{2} (3.875 sq mi)

Population (2024)
  - Total: 8,073
  - Rank: 19th
  - Density: 804.4/km^{2} (2,083/sq mi)

Ethnicity (2021)
  - Estonians: 92.3%
  - Russians: 3.23%
  - other: 4.47%
- Time zone: UTC+2 (EET)
  - Summer (DST): UTC+3 (EEST)

Drone video of Paide and its castle

Paide is a town in Estonia and the capital of Järva County, one of the 15 counties of Estonia.

== Etymology ==
Paide's German name Weißenstein (originally Wittenstein or Wittensten in Low German) means 'white stone'. This name was derived from the limestone used for the construction of Paide Castle. A Latin translation, Albus Lapis, has also been used. The Estonian name Paide was first recorded in 1564 as Paida. It is thought to derive from the word paas, pae, meaning 'limestone'.

=== Paide Vallitorn ===
A castle was built in Paide by order of Konrad von Mandern, master of the Livonian Order, sometime in 1265 or 1266. It was from the beginning constructed around the central tower or keep, locally known as Tall Hermann tower or Vallitorn. With its six storeys, the tower has always been the core of the castle complex. The fortress was strengthened during the 14th and 15th centuries, when the surrounding walls were enlarged and towers added. It was also modernised to be able to meet the new threat of firearms. During the 16th century, the castle was again modified through the addition of outer bastions.

During the Livonian War, the castle was repeatedly besieged by Russian troops, and in 1573 it was occupied by troops loyal to Ivan the Terrible. After that, the castle changed hands several times. It was also involved in the fighting during the 1600-1611 Polish-Swedish War, in the so-called Siege of Weissenstein.

In 1895-1897 restoration work was carried out on the central tower and some other parts of the castle. However, in 1941, during World War II, retreating Soviet troops blew up the central tower and it was not repaired until after Estonia regained its independence, in 1990–1993.

Today the restored central tower houses a part of Järva County museum.

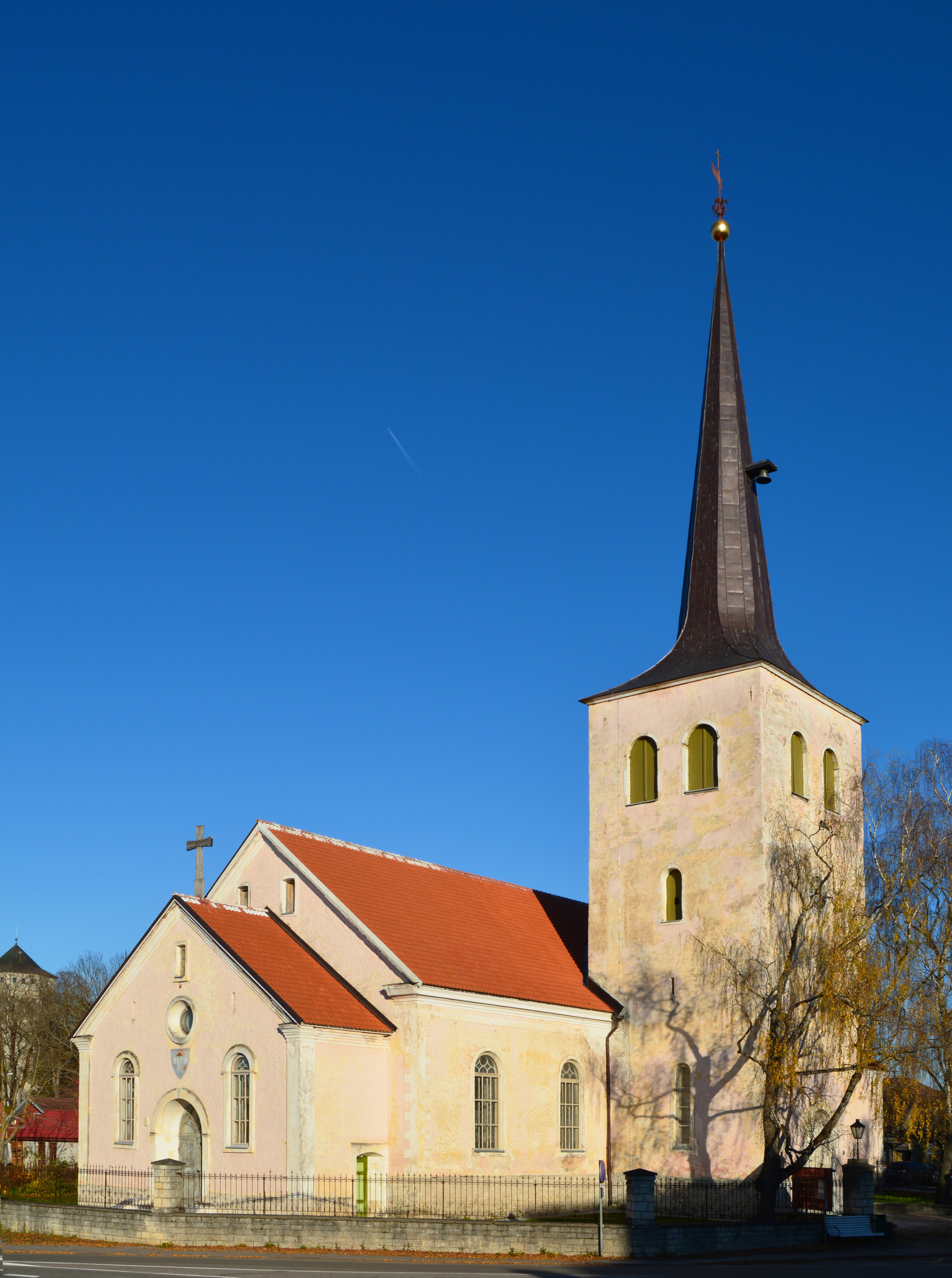
Paide Püha Risti kirik

=== Paide Church ===
Paide Church originally dates from the 16th century; however, it has been very badly damaged in both war and fire on several occasions, and the present-day building dates mainly from a reconstruction which took place in 1909-1910 under the supervision of architect J. C. Mühlhausen.

== Demographics ==
Ethnic Composition 1922-2021
| Ethnicity | 1922 | | 1934 | | 1941 | | 1959 | | 1970 | | 1979 | | 1989 | | 2000 | | 2011 | | 2021 | |
| Ethnicity | amount | % | amount | % | amount | % | amount | % | amount | % | amount | % | amount | % | amount | % | amount | % | amount | % |
|---|---|---|---|---|---|---|---|---|---|---|---|---|---|---|---|---|---|---|---|---|
| Estonians | 2693 | 90.5 | 3070 | 93.5 | 2927 | 98.3 | 5351 | 91.7 | 6774 | 85.6 | 8363 | 86.7 | 9411 | 86.7 | 8683 | 90.1 | 7602 | 92.4 | 7312 | 92.3 |
| Russians | 61 | 2.05 | 38 | 1.16 | 14 | 0.47 | - | - | 560 | 7.08 | 806 | 8.36 | 926 | 8.54 | 512 | 5.31 | 359 | 4.36 | 256 | 3.23 |
| Ukrainians | - | - | 0 | 0.00 | - | - | - | - | 47 | 0.59 | 85 | 0.88 | 156 | 1.44 | 120 | 1.24 | 87 | 1.06 | 160 | 2.02 |
| Belarusians | - | - | - | - | - | - | - | - | 27 | 0.34 | 35 | 0.36 | 50 | 0.46 | 20 | 0.21 | 15 | 0.18 | 26 | 0.33 |
| Finns | - | - | 2 | 0.06 | 1 | 0.03 | - | - | 153 | 1.93 | 158 | 1.64 | 152 | 1.40 | 115 | 1.19 | 60 | 0.73 | 46 | 0.58 |
| Jews | 12 | 0.40 | 18 | 0.55 | 0 | 0.00 | - | - | 4 | 0.05 | 1 | 0.01 | 2 | 0.02 | 3 | 0.03 | 1 | 0.01 | 0 | 0.00 |
| Latvians | - | - | 7 | 0.21 | 3 | 0.10 | - | - | 9 | 0.11 | 20 | 0.21 | 8 | 0.07 | 3 | 0.03 | 2 | 0.02 | 9 | 0.11 |
| Germans | 175 | 5.88 | 132 | 4.02 | - | - | - | - | - | - | 67 | 0.69 | 41 | 0.38 | 24 | 0.25 | 18 | 0.22 | 11 | 0.14 |
| Tatars | - | - | 0 | 0.00 | - | - | - | - | - | - | 5 | 0.05 | 3 | 0.03 | 4 | 0.04 | 2 | 0.02 | 3 | 0.04 |
| Poles | - | - | 1 | 0.03 | 4 | 0.13 | - | - | - | - | 25 | 0.26 | 15 | 0.14 | 20 | 0.21 | 16 | 0.19 | 9 | 0.11 |
| Lithuanians | - | - | 1 | 0.03 | 0 | 0.00 | - | - | 8 | 0.10 | 9 | 0.09 | 9 | 0.08 | 7 | 0.07 | 5 | 0.06 | 4 | 0.05 |
| unknown | 0 | 0.00 | 0 | 0.00 | 3 | 0.10 | 0 | 0.00 | 0 | 0.00 | 0 | 0.00 | 0 | 0.00 | 61 | 0.63 | 12 | 0.15 | 41 | 0.52 |
| other | 35 | 1.18 | 16 | 0.49 | 26 | 0.87 | 486 | 8.33 | 329 | 4.16 | 67 | 0.69 | 76 | 0.70 | 70 | 0.73 | 49 | 0.60 | 50 | 0.63 |
| Total | 2976 | 100 | 3285 | 100 | 2978 | 100 | 5837 | 100 | 7911 | 100 | 9641 | 100 | 10849 | 100 | 9642 | 100 | 8228 | 100 | 7926 | 100.01 |

== Sports ==
Paide is home to Paide linnastaadion, the home ground of Meistriliiga football team Paide Linnameeskond.

== Notable residents ==
- Alexander von Ungern-Sternberg (1806–1869), a Baltic German novelist, poet and painter
- Teodor Ussisoo (1878–1959), pedagogue, furniture designer and interior architect
- Ekaterina Kalinina (1882–1960), Bolshevik revolutionary and wife of the Soviet head of state Mikhail Kalinin
- Richard Indreko (1900–1961), historian and archaeologist
- Tullio Ilomets (1921–2018), chemist and science historian
- Ita Ever (1931–2023), stage and film actress
- Arvo Pärt (born 1935), classical music composer
- Helle-Reet Helenurm (1944–2003), actress
- Toomas Raudam (born 1947), writer
- Mati Sirkel (born 1949), translator and writer
- Andres Noormets (born 1963), actor and stage director
- Jaanus Marrandi (born 1963), politician and agricultural minister, 2002/03
- Neeme Väli (born 1965), a Major General of the Estonian Defence League.
- Karin Tammaru (born 1971), stage, TV and film actress.
- Carmen Kass (born 1978), model
- Kristjan Kõljalg (born 1982), politician
- Mauno Meesit (born 1983), musician, composer, record producer and visual artist.

=== Sport ===
- Harald Kaarmann (1901–1942), footballer, played 17 games for Estonia
- Johannes Brenner (1906–1975), footballer, played 16 games for Estonia
- Kalle Kiik (born 1963), chess player who won the Estonian Chess Championship in 1988
- Meelis Rooba (born 1977), football who played 260 games and 50 for Estonia, finishing with 53 for Paide Linnameeskond
- Urmas Rooba (born 1978), footballer who played over 230 games and 70 for Estonia, finishing with 40 for Paide Linnameeskond
- Tarmo Neemelo (born 1982), footballer who has played 578 games and 22 for Estonia, including 220 for Nõmme Kalju FC
- Siim Luts (born 1989), footballer who has played over 420 games and 43 for Estonia including 159 for Paide Linnameeskond

== Gallery ==
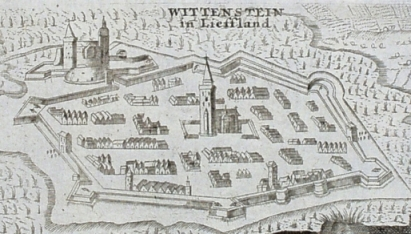
View of Paide, made sometime before 1632

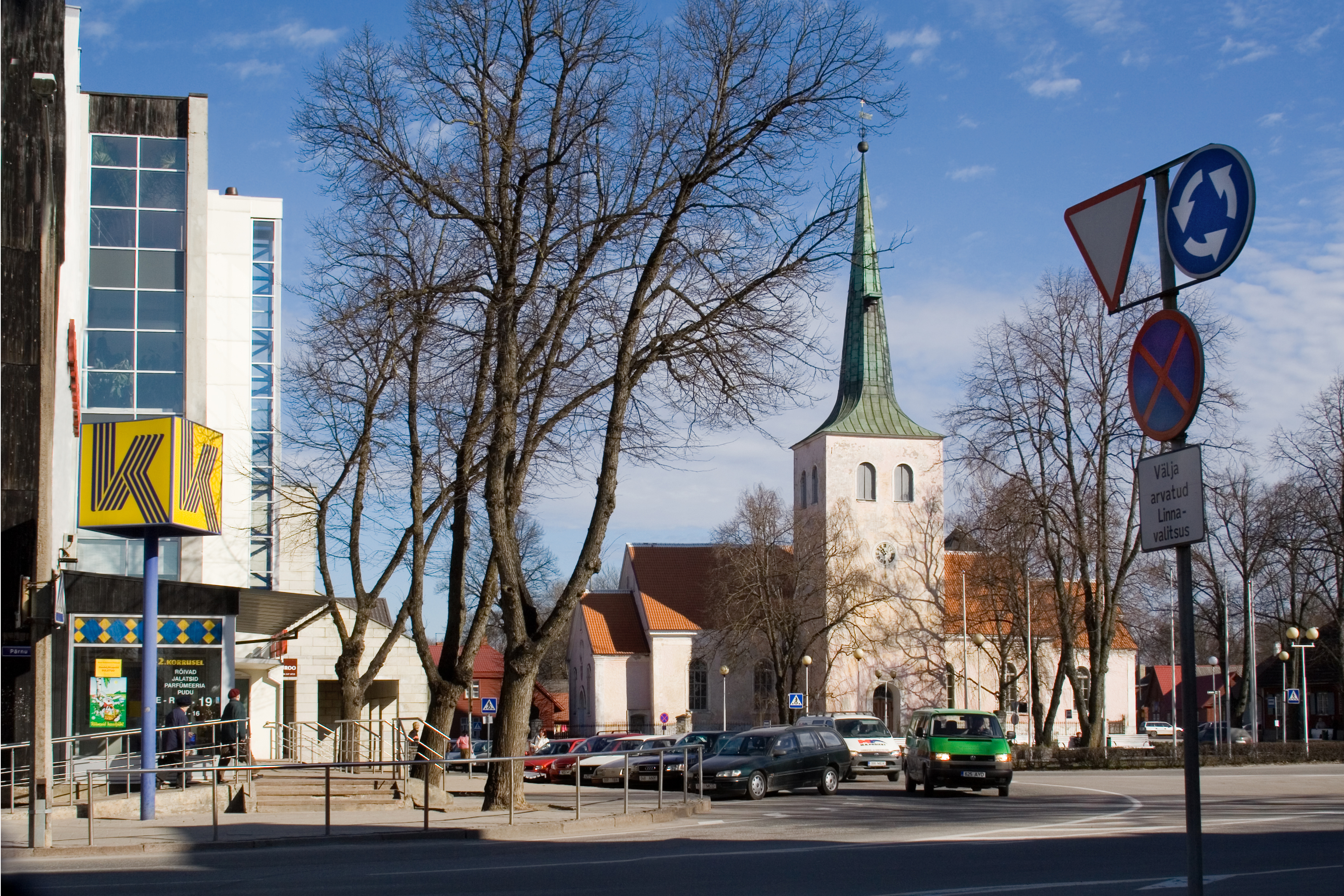
Town square

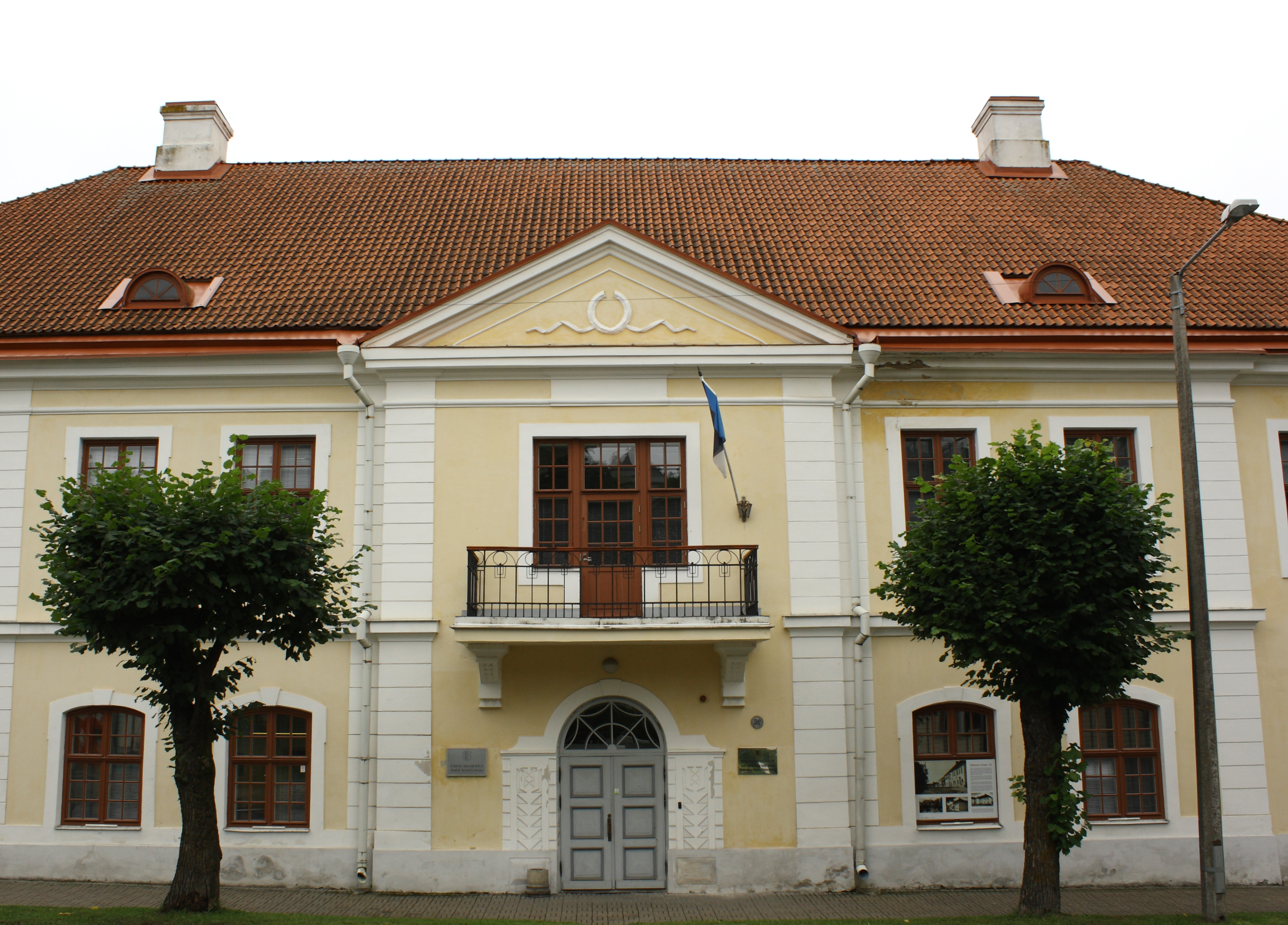
Courthouse

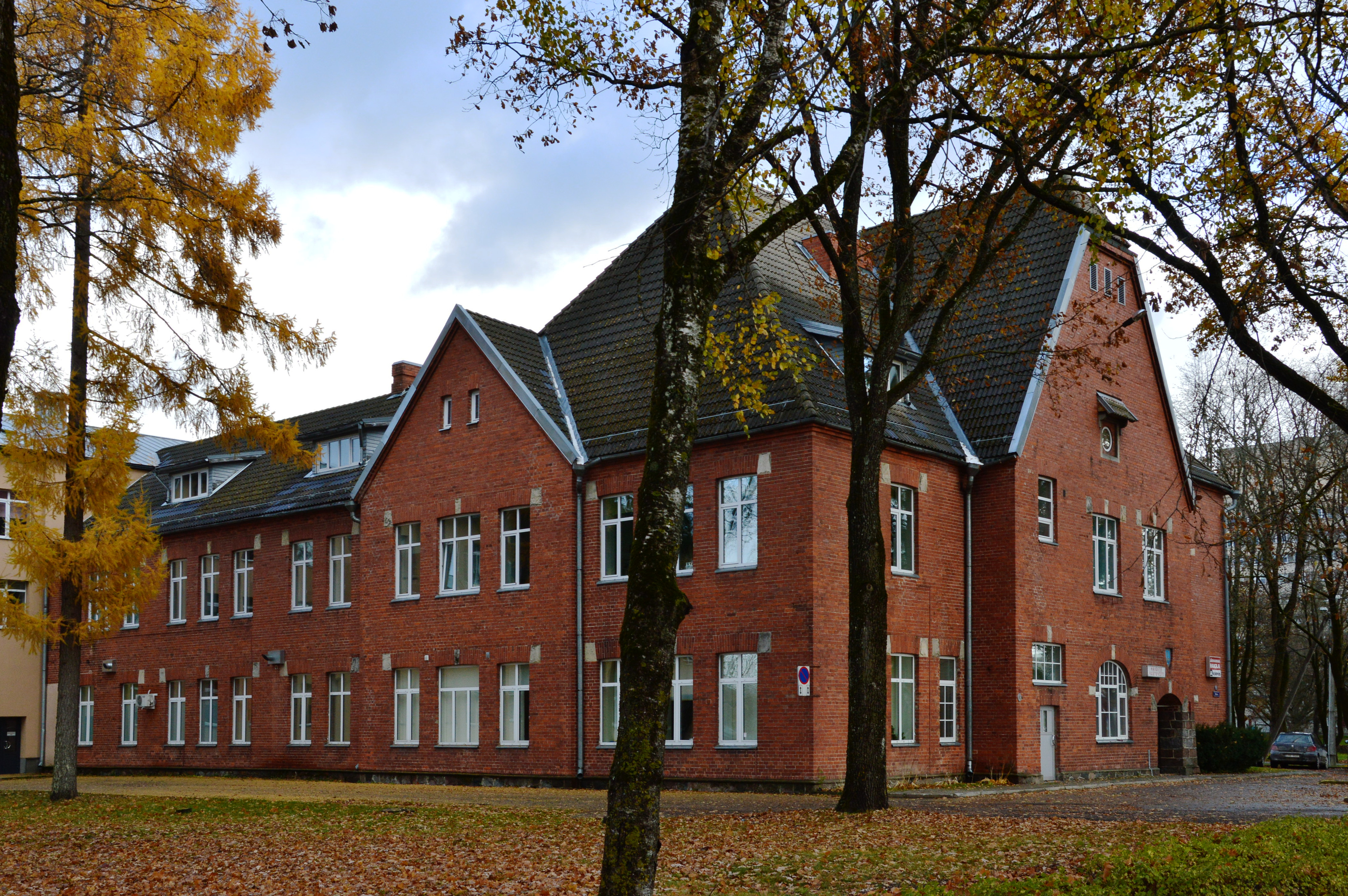
Hospital clinic (former German Girls' Private Gymnasium)

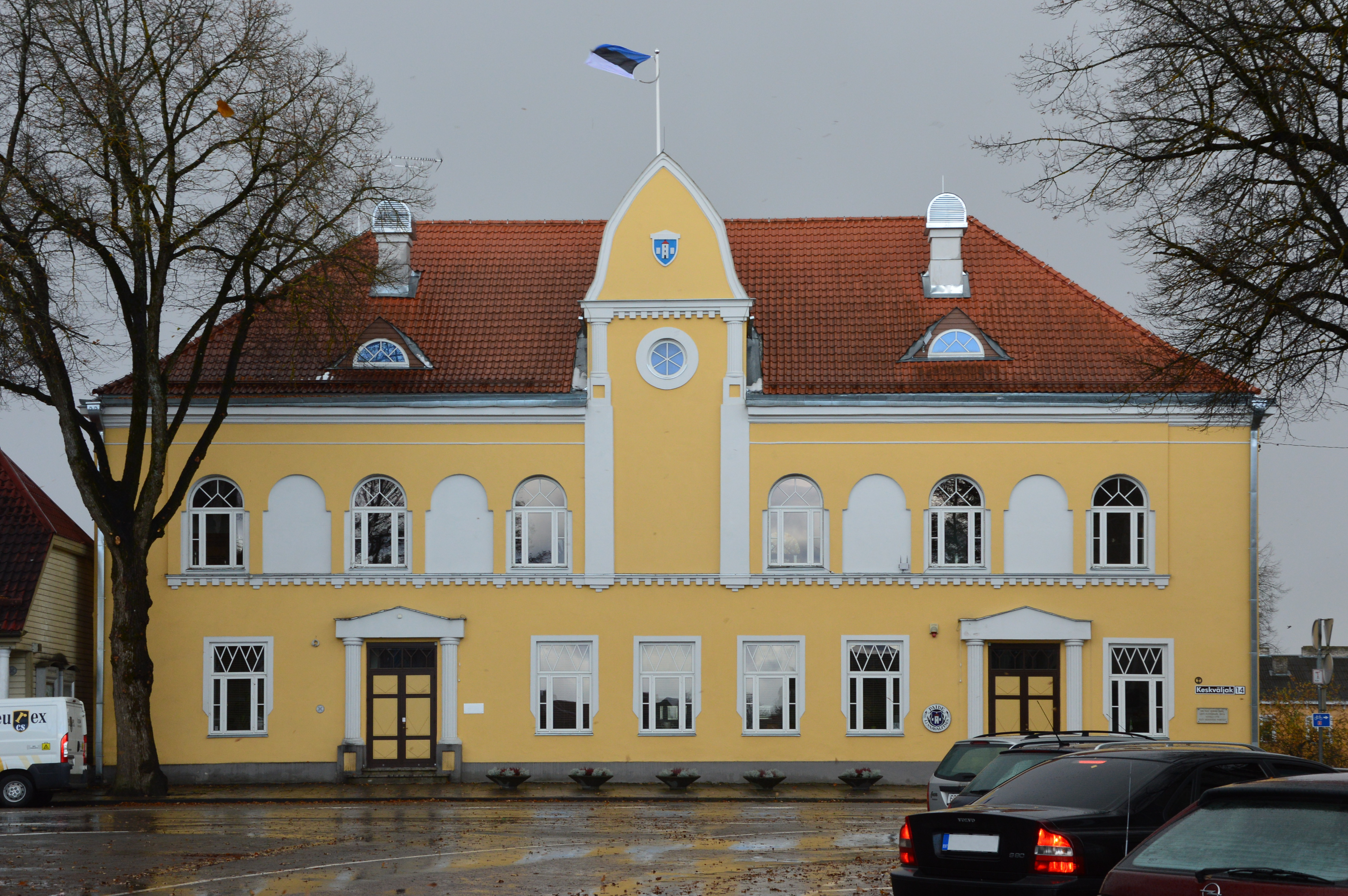
Paide Town Hall

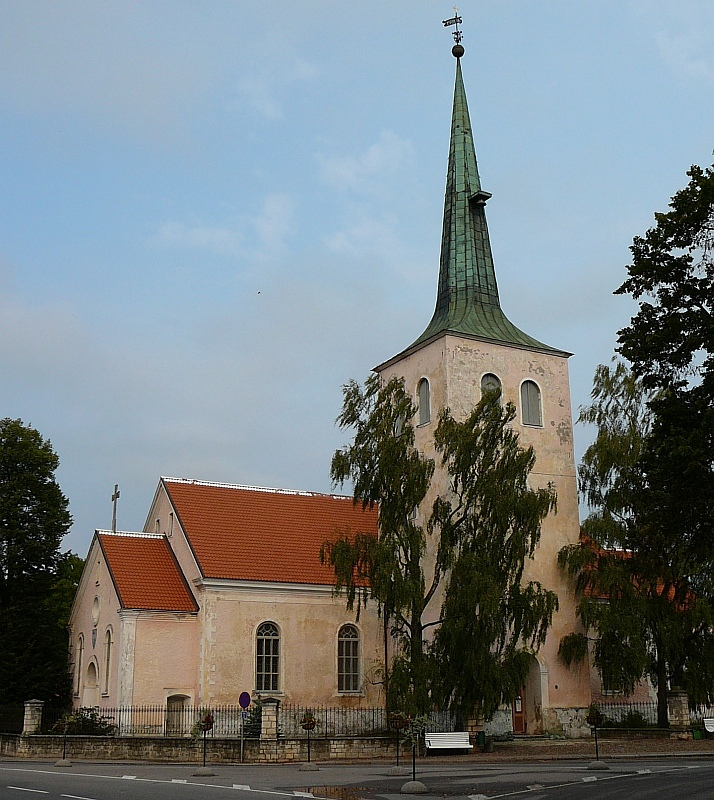
Paide Church

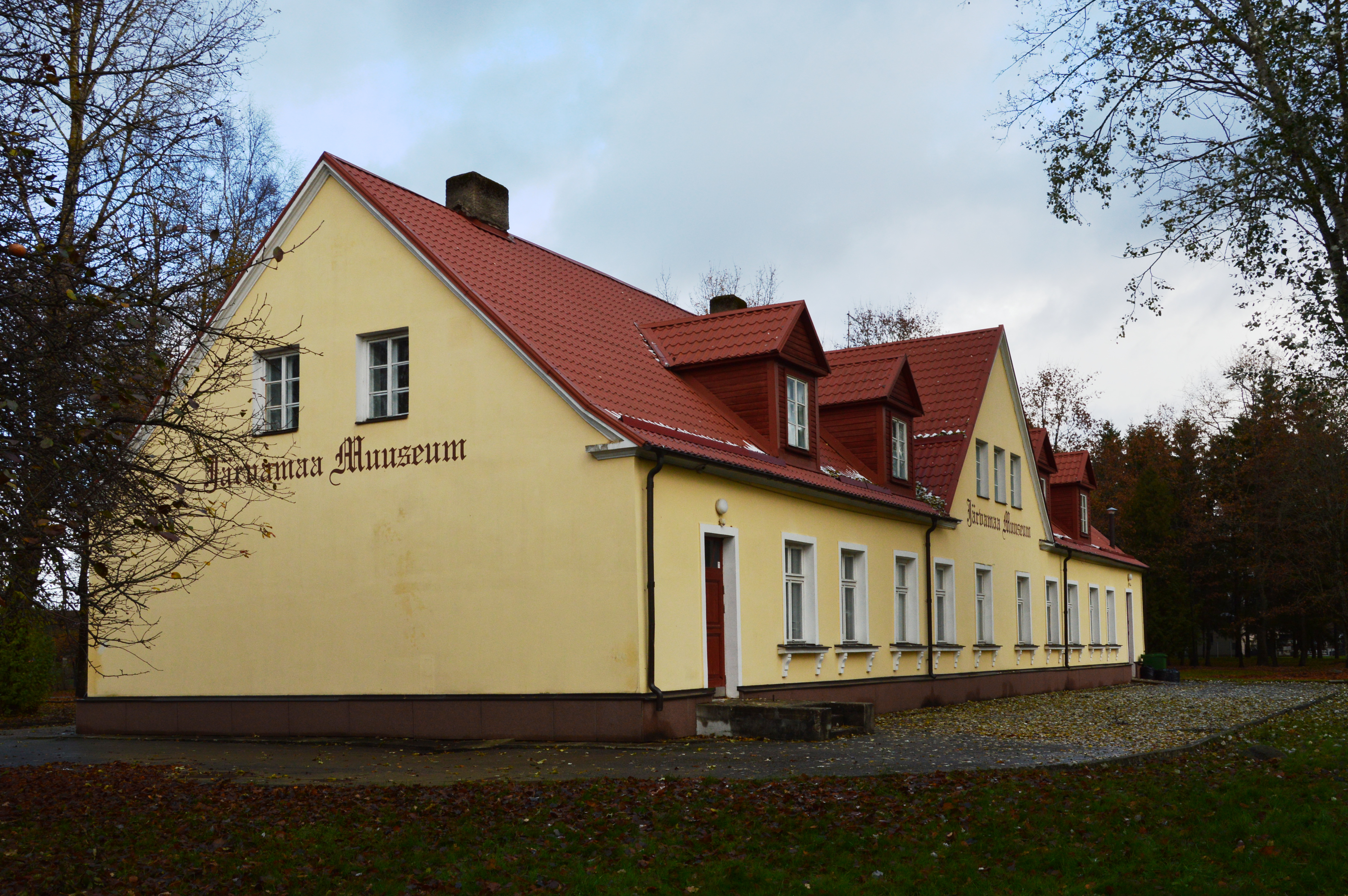
Järvamaa Museum

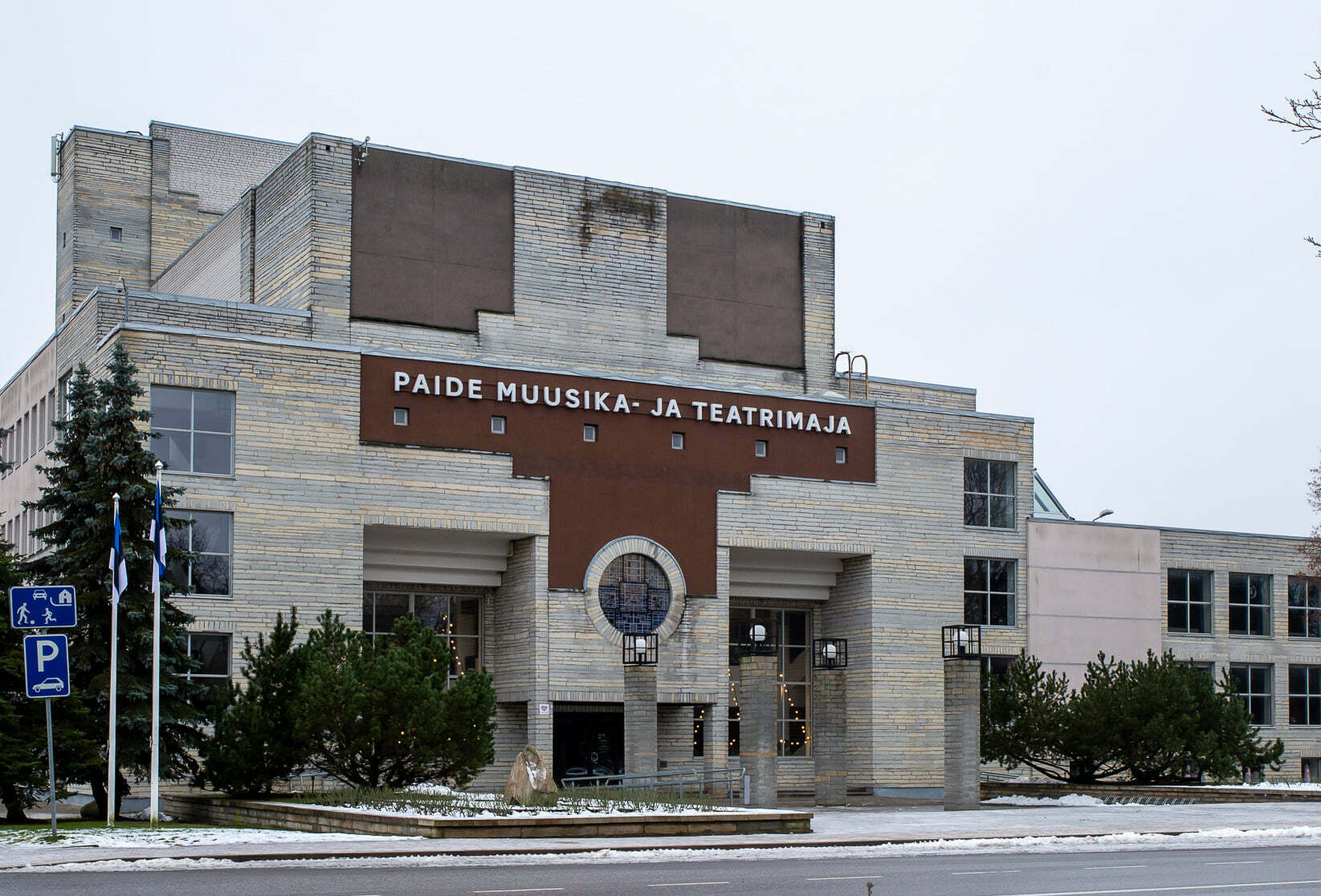
Music and Theatre House

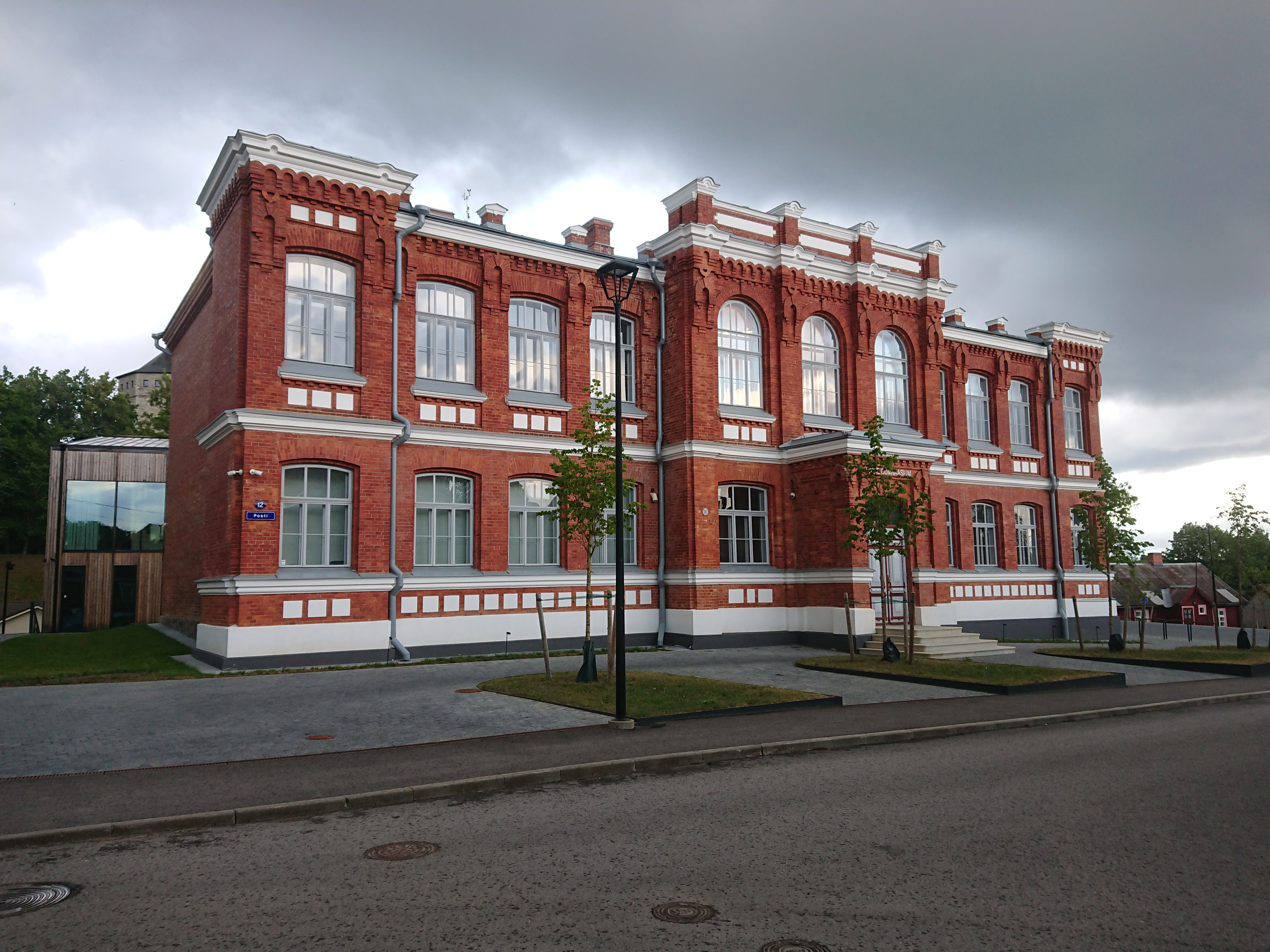
Paide Gymnasium

== See also ==
- Siege of Weissenstein
