= 1964 in Estonia =

- Decades: 1940s; 1950s; 1960s; 1970s; 1980s
- See also: Other events of 1964; Timeline of Estonian history

This article lists events that occurred during 1964 in Estonia.

== Events ==
- Kalamaja Cemetery was destroyed by Soviet authorities.
