= 1972 in Estonia =

- Decades: 1950s; 1960s; 1970s; 1980s; 1990s
- See also: Other events of 1972; Timeline of Estonian history

This article lists events that occurred during 1972 in Estonia.

== Incumbents ==
- Chairman of the Supreme Soviet is Ilmar Vahe.
- Chairman of the Supreme Soviet Presidium is Artur Vader.
- Chairman of the Council of Ministers is Valter Klauson.

== Events ==
- May 5 – Viru Hotel was opened.

== Births ==
- 3 February – Mart Poom, Estonian footballer

== Cinematography ==
In 1972 Tallinnfilm company made movies:

- Väike reekviem suupillile ('Little Requiem for the Harmonica')
- Maaletulek ('To Come to the Shore')
- Verekivi ('Bloody Stone')
