= 1976 in Estonia =

- Decades: 1950s; 1960s; 1970s; 1980s; 1990s
- See also: Other events of 1976; Timeline of Estonian history

This article lists events that occurred during 1976 in Estonia.

== Events ==
- 8 August – Letipea massacre.
- 25 October – Osmussaar earthquake.

== Births ==
- 3 March – Keit Pentus-Rosimannus, politician
- 6 August – Andero Ermel, actor
