= 1973 in Estonia =

- Decades: 1950s; 1960s; 1970s; 1980s; 1990s
- See also: Other events of 1973; Timeline of Estonian history

This article lists events that occurred during 1973 in Estonia.

== Events ==
- Eesti Power Plant were commissioned.
