= Pirita Velodrome =

Bicycle track and football stadium in Tallinn, Estonia

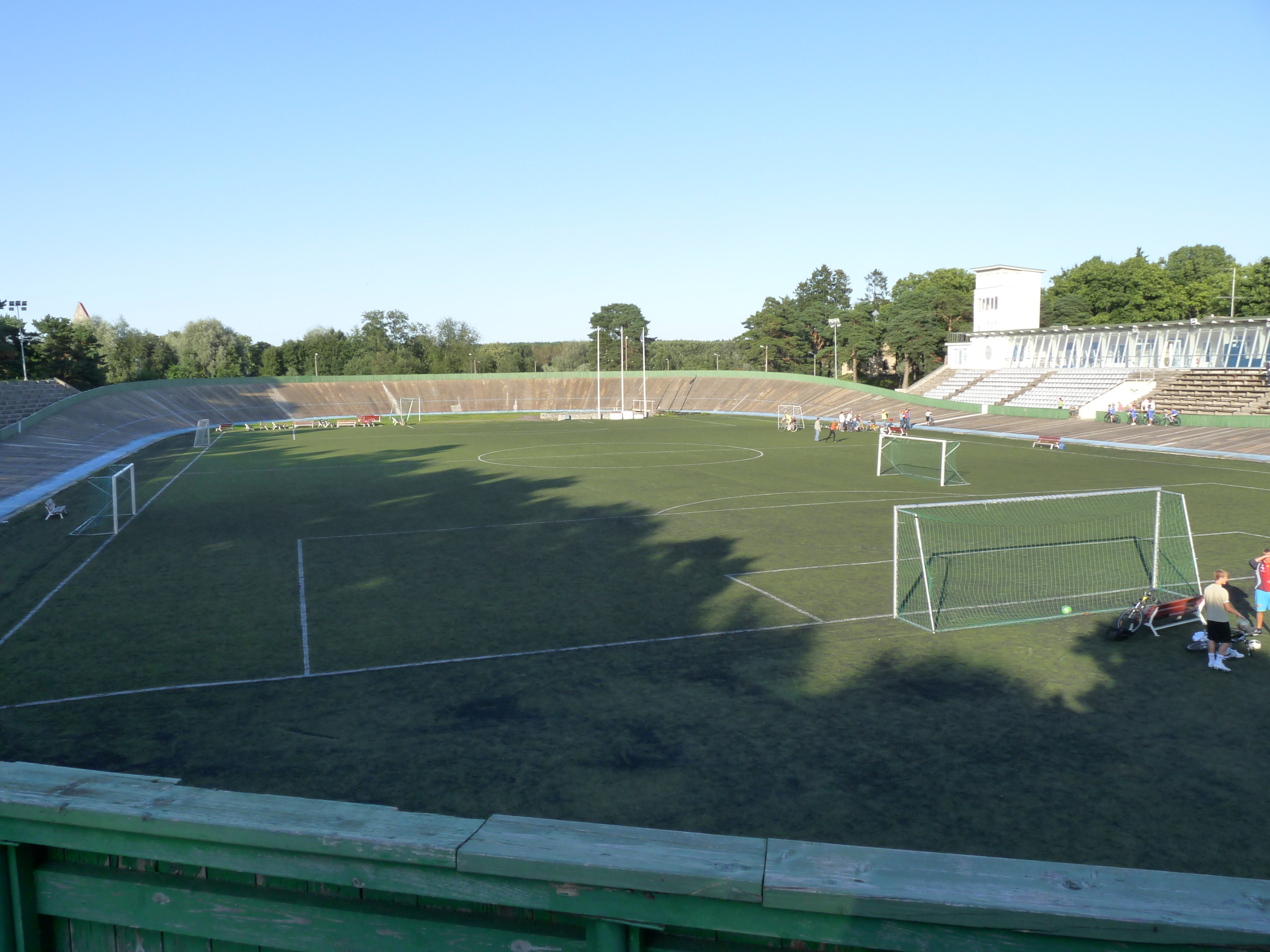
- Interactive map of Pirita Velodrome
- Coordinates: 59°27′48″N 24°49′54″E
- Capacity: 1602
- Surface: Artificial turf (field), concrete (track)
- Field size: 90.5 × 49 m (field); 333,333 m (track)

Construction
- Opened: 1969
- Renovated: 2015

The Pirita Velodrome (Estonian: Pirita Velodroom) is a velodrome and football stadium in the Pirita district of Tallinn, Estonia.

It has 1602 seats.

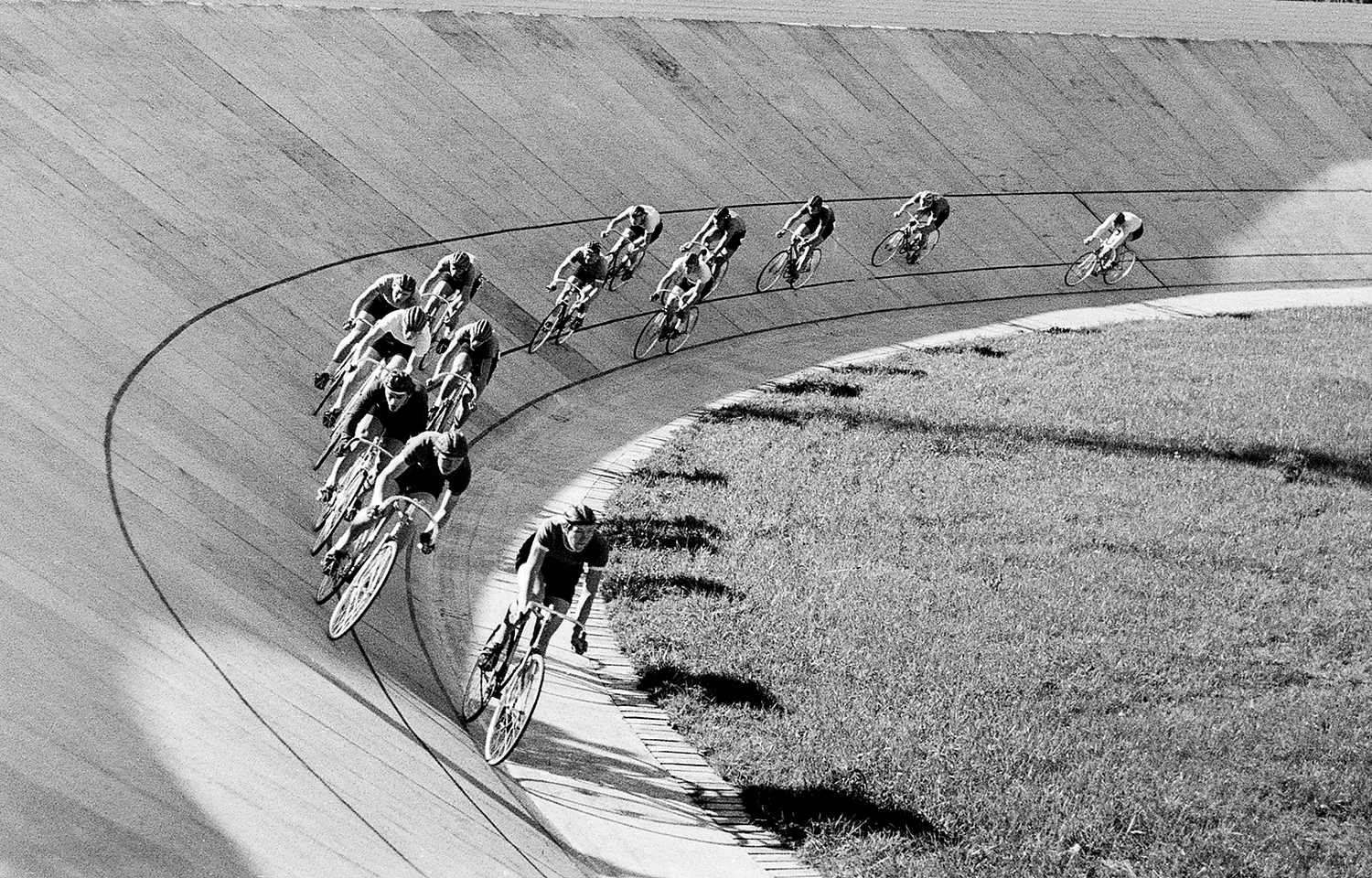
1971

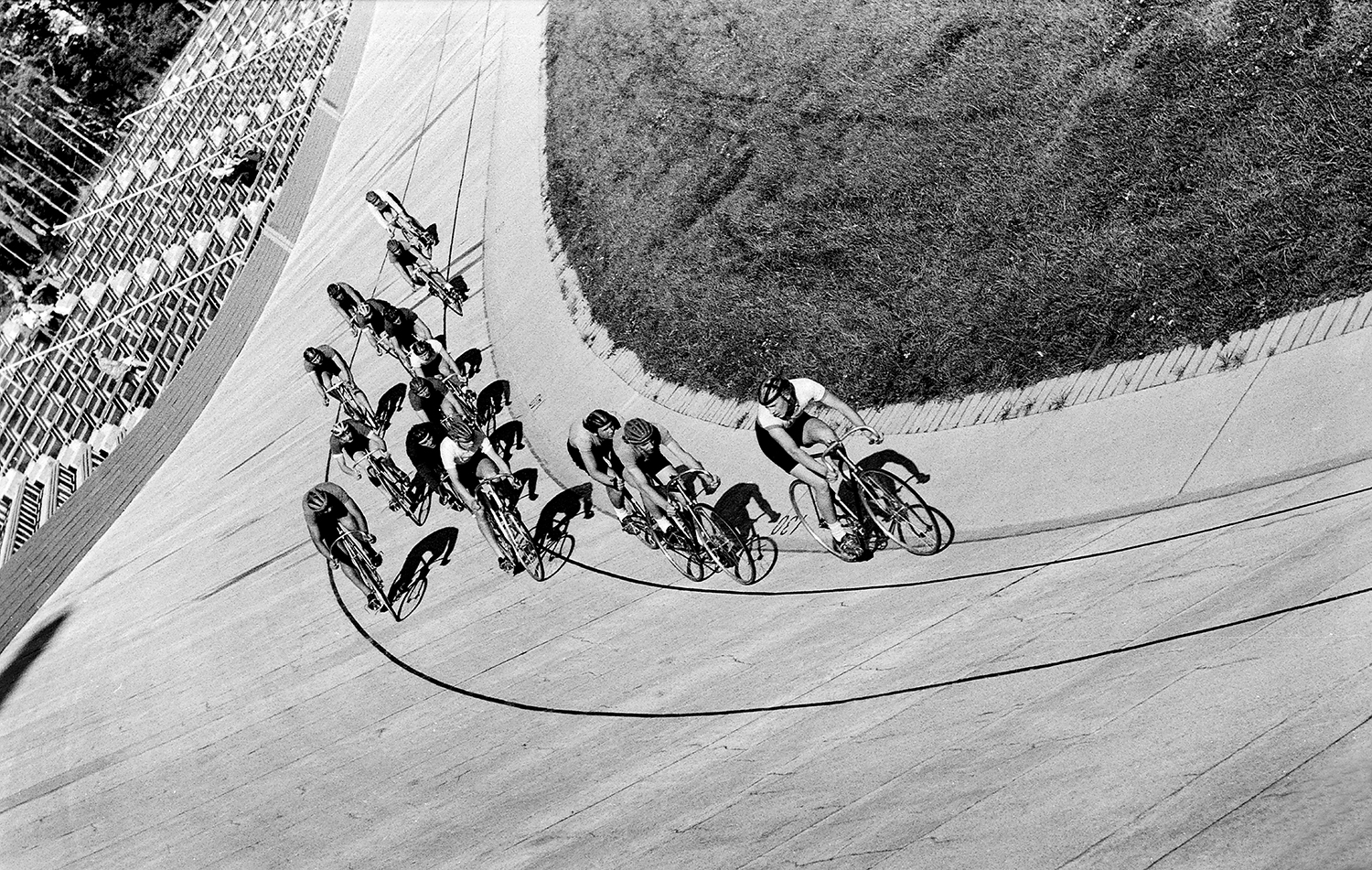
1971

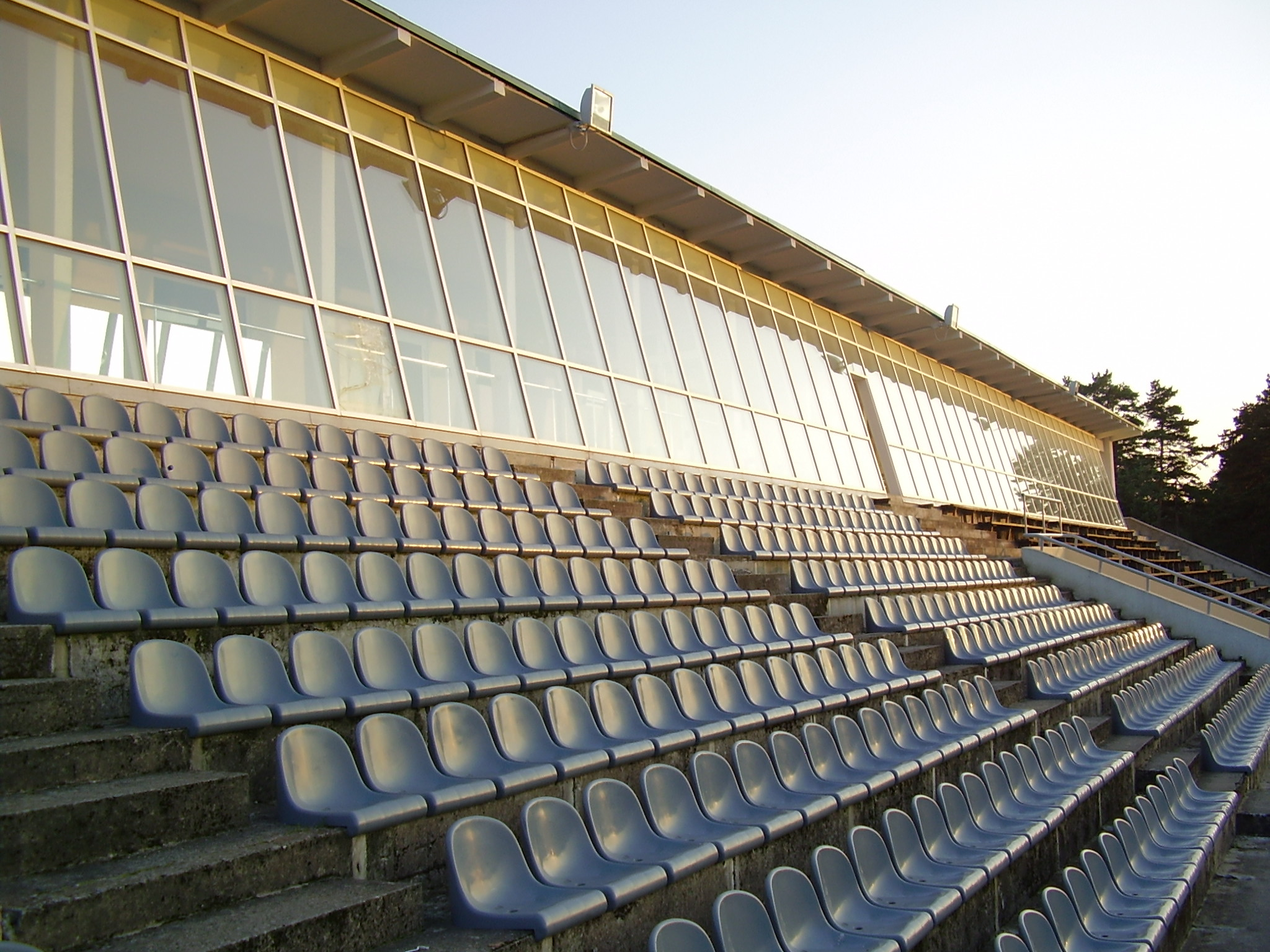
2005

== See also ==
- List of cycling tracks and velodromes
