= Kristjan Kõljalg =

Estonian politician (born 1982)

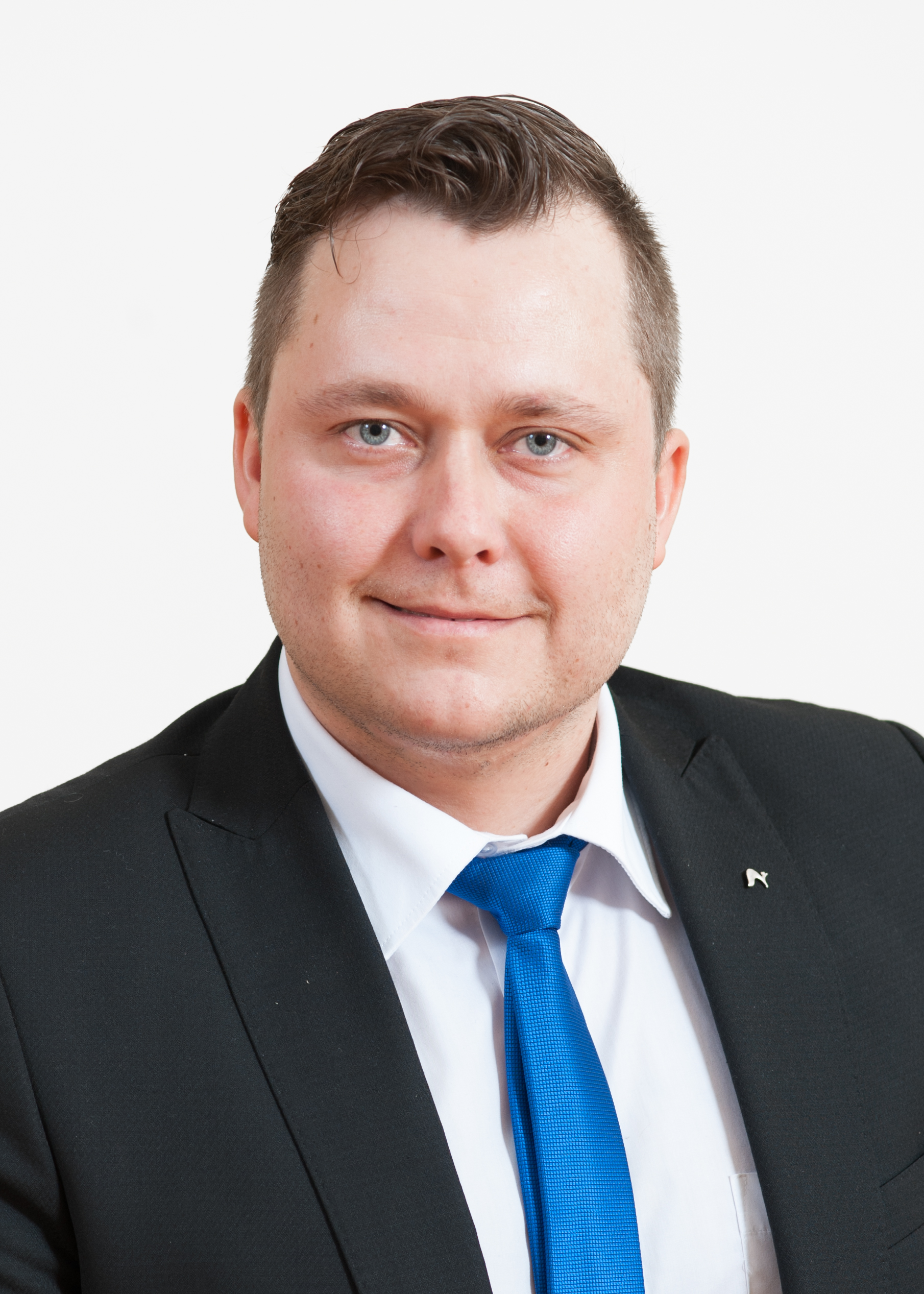
Kristjan Kõljalg

Kristjan Kõljalg (born 26 December 1982 in Paide) is an Estonian politician. He was a member of the XIII Riigikogu, representing the Estonian Reform Party.
