= Karin Tammemägi =

Estonian politician (born 1975)

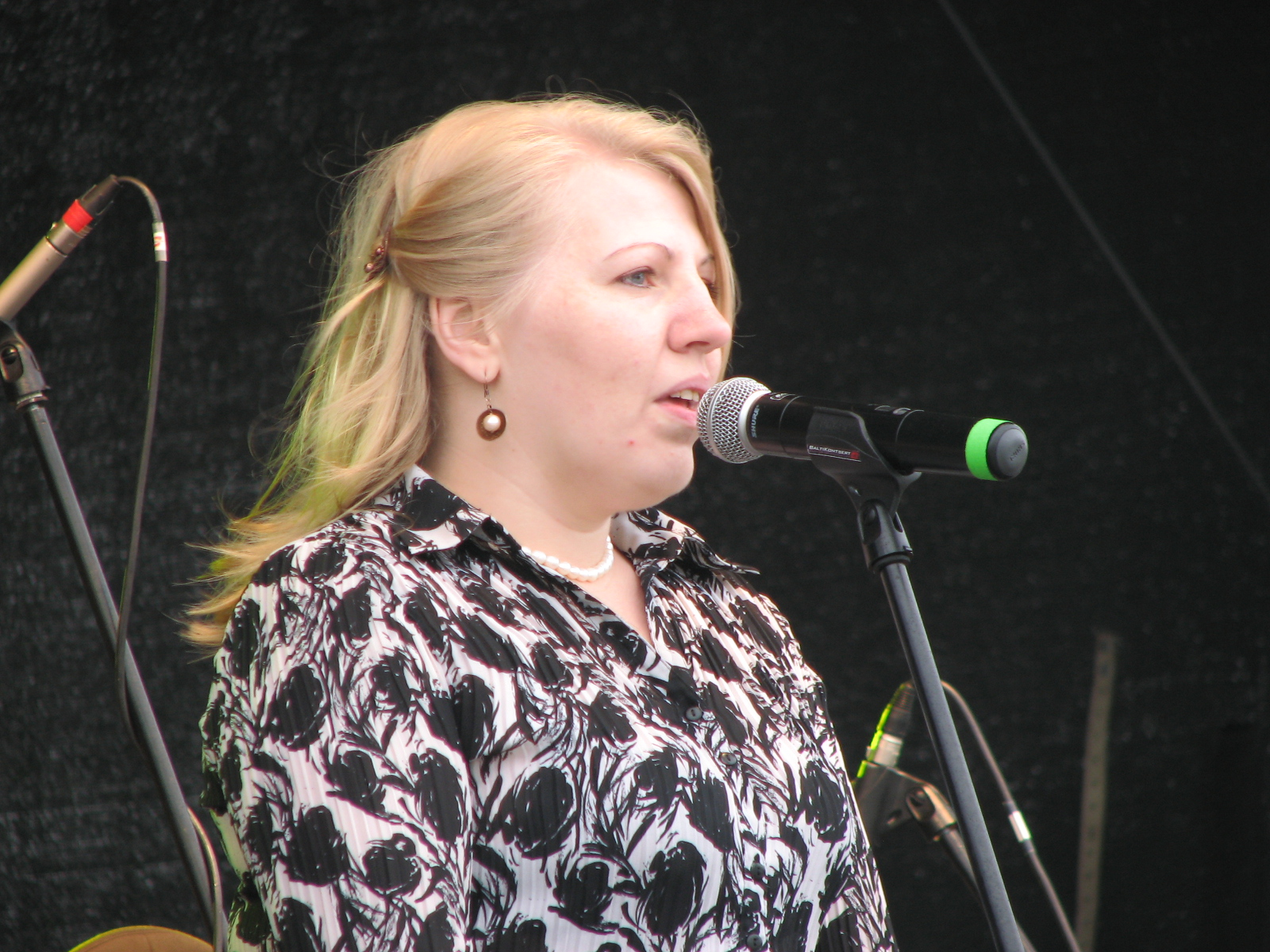
Karin Tammemägi in 2011.

Karin Tammemägi (born 4 June 1975 in Kaalepi) is an Estonian politician. She was a member of the XIII Riigikogu.
