= Ott Lumi =

Estonian politician (born 1978)

Ott Lumi (born 1 December 1978 in Tallinn) is an Estonian politician. He was a member of XI Riigikogu.
