= Sulev Vare =

Estonian politician (born 1962)

Sulev Vare (born 25 May 1962 in Kuressaare) is an Estonian politician. He was a member of XI Riigikogu.
