= Robert Antropov =

Estonian politician (born 1965)

Robert Antropov (born 29 January 1965, in Rakvere) is an Estonian politician. He was a member of XI Riigikogu.
