= Otto Lellep =

German inventor

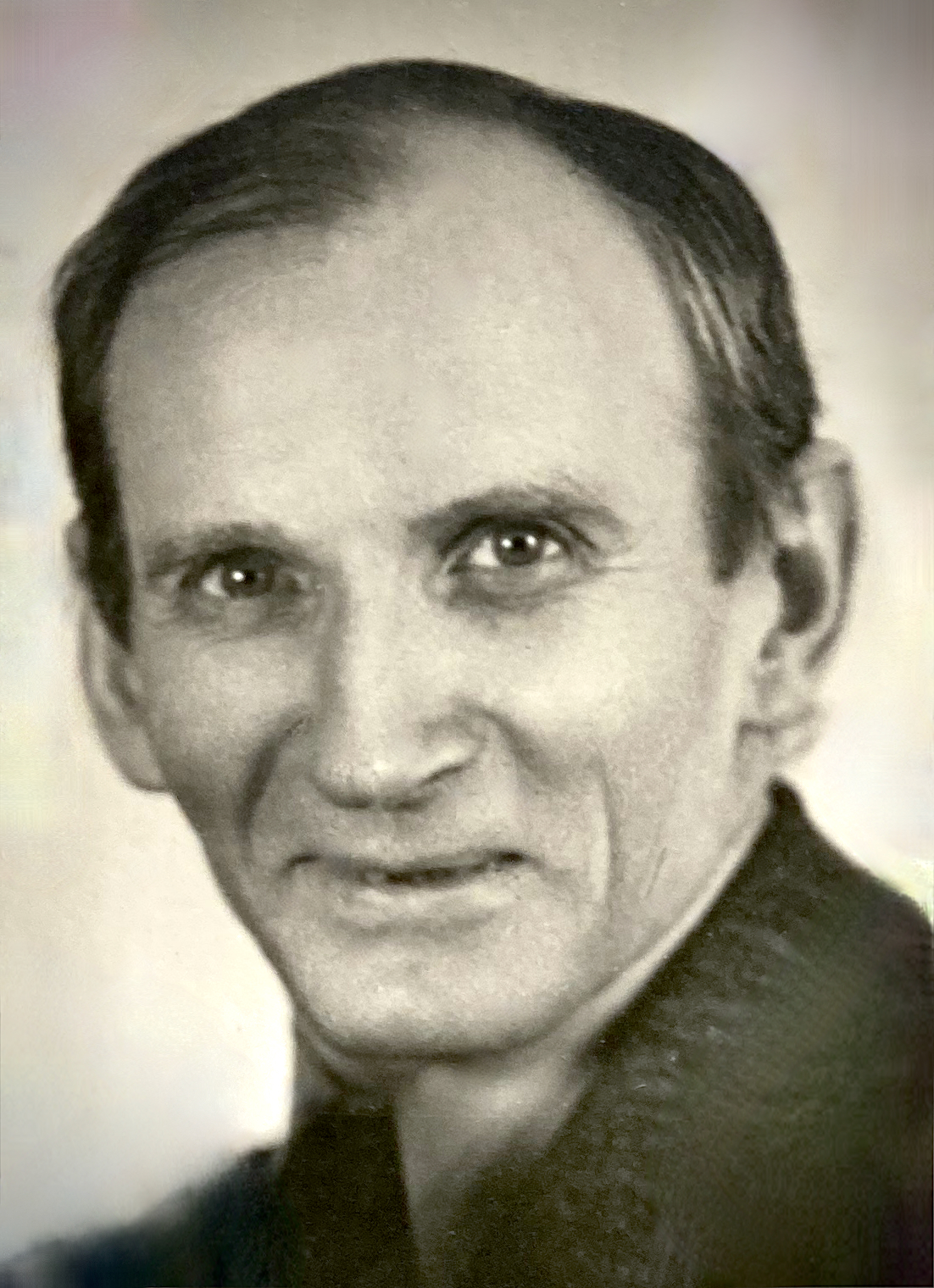

Personal details
- Born: September 29, 1884; Viljandi, Estonia
- Died: October 18, 1975 (aged 91); Fort Myers, Florida, United States
- Profession: Inventor, engineer

Otto Georg Lellep (29 September 1884 – 18 October 1975) was an Estonian-born American inventor and metallurgical engineer.

== Biography ==
Otto Lellep was born on a farm near Viljandi, in 1884. He studied at the Tallinn Secondary School of Science, the Clausthal University of Technology and at the Technical University of Braunschweig where he received his doctorate. In 1917 he went to the United States to pursue research on nickel mining. Although he had originally intended to return to Europe, he remained in the United States and was awarded American citizenship in 1923.

While working as an engineer at Polysius, he invented the Lepol kiln, which reduced the amount of energy that was needed to produce cement and the processing of iron ore. (Lepol is a combination of Lellep and Polysius). In recognition of his engineering work, in 1960 he received, along with Robert Durrer the Carl Lueg Commemorative Medal from the Stahlinstitut VDEh.

== Selected publications ==
- 1930: Wärmetechnische Untersuchungen über den Wärmeaufwand beim Zementbrennen. Verbund-Rost-Drehofen, Dessau.
