= Kaja Kreisman =

Estonian politician (born 1968)

Kaja Kreisman (born 20 March 1968 in Kiviõli) is an Estonian politician. She was a member of XII Riigikogu.
