= 1985 Estonian Supreme Soviet election =

- 24 February 1985

All 285 seats in the Supreme Soviet 143 seats needed for a majority
- Turnout: 99.99% (0.00pp)
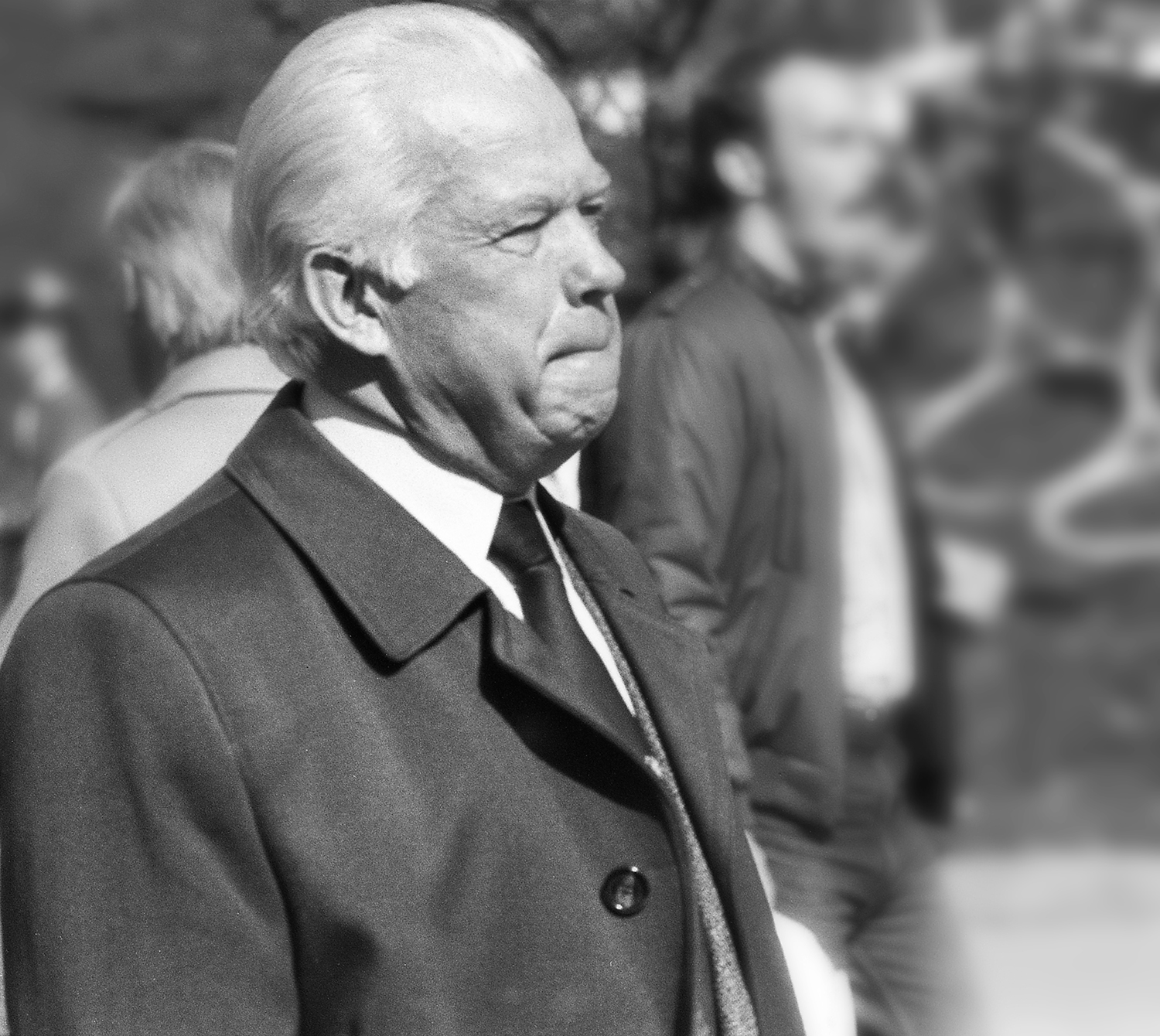
	First party
Leader	Karl Vaino
Party	CPSU
Last election	99.89%, 285 seats
Seats won	285
Seat change	Steady
Percentage	99.96%
Swing	▲0.07pp

Elections to the Supreme Soviet of the Estonian SSR were held on 24 February 1985. The Bloc of Communists and Non-Partisans was the only party able to contest the elections, and won all 285 seats.

== Results ==
Party	Votes	%	Seats
Bloc of Communists and Non-Partisans	1,102,839	99.96	285
Against	488	0.04	–
Total	1,103,327	100.00	285
Valid votes	1,103,327	100.00	
Invalid/blank votes	0	0.00	
Total votes	1,103,327	100.00	
Registered voters/turnout	1,103,388	99.99	
Source: Liivik, Rahva Hääl

== See also ==
- List of members of the Supreme Soviet of the Estonian Soviet Socialist Republic, 1985–1990
