= List of members of the Supreme Soviet of the Estonian Soviet Socialist Republic, 1985–1990 =

This is a list of members of the eleventh legislature of the Supreme Soviet of the Estonian Soviet Socialist Republic which was the Estonian Soviet Socialist Republic's legislative chamber between 1940 and 1941, and between 1944 and 1992. The session ran from 24 February 1985 to 18 March 1990, and followed the 1985 Estonian Supreme Soviet election in which only Bloc of Communists and Non-Party Candidates was the only party able to contest the elections.

== List of members ==
Source: Jaan Toomla, Valitud ja Valitsenud: Eesti parlamentaarsete ja muude esinduskogude ning valitsuste isikkoosseis aastail 1917–1999 (National Library of Estonia, 1999), pp. 113–119.

| Name | Party | Notes |
|---|---|---|
| Eduard Aamer | NLKP | |
| Juhan Ääre | NLKP | Elected on 13.11.1988 |
| Aili Aben | NLKP | |
| Maido Agur | NLKP | |
| Rein Ahman | NLKP | |
| Ilme Aim | NLKP | |
| Alar Ainumäe | NLKP | |
| Rain Alberg | NLKP | |
| Leonid Aleksin | NLKP | |
| Leonid Alihver | NLKP | |
| Georgi Aljošin | NLKP | Elected on 16.02.1986 |
| Luule Allika | NLKP | |
| Jaak Allmere | NLKP | |
| Arno Almann | NLKP | |
| Leonid Ananitš | NLKP | Left office on 07.02.1988 |
| Vladimir Andrejev | NLKP | |
| Galina Andrejeva | NLKP | |
| Marina Anslan | NLKP | Elected on 16.06.1985 |
| Andres Aruvald | NLKP | |
| Helgar-Jüri Aun | | |
| Erna Aus | | |
| Merike Ausmaa (Kitsik) | ÜLKNÜ | |
| Mira Balandjuh(h) (Gorodova) | | |
| Aleksandr Banasko | NLKP | |
| Nikolai Bardin | NLKP | |
| Juni Belov | NLKP | Elected on 07.02.1988 |
| Kalev Benno | NLKP | |
| Ljudmilla Berezovskaja | ÜLKNÜ | |
| Ljubov Bezlepkina | | |
| Romualdas Blažys | | |
| Valentina Ivani t. Boitsova | NLKP | |
| Valentina Mihhaili t. Boitsova | | |
| Niina Bolšakova | NLKP | |
| Oleg Bos(s)enko | | |
| Irina Bubnova | NLKP | |
| Nikolai Dmitri(j)ev | NLKP | Died in office on 03.05.1985 |
| Valter Eks | NLKP | |
| Hillar Eller | NLKP | |
| Rein Elvak | NLKP | |
| Heino Ennok | | |
| Irina Fell | | |
| Jüri Feodorov | ÜLKNÜ | |
| Jevgeni Filatov | NLKP | |
| Nikolai Ganjušov | NLKP | |
| Jan Ganzen | NLKP | |
| Vassili Gnezdilov | NLKP | |
| Arnold Green | NLKP | |
| Elsa Gretškina | NLKP | |
| Raimund Hagelberg | NLKP | |
| Valter Hallmägi | NLKP | |
| Marianne Hermann | | |
| Urve Hindriksoo | ÜLKNÜ | |
| Galina Hnõkina (Setkova) | ÜLKNÜ | |
| Anna Holdblom | NLKP | |
| Esper Horg | ÜLKNÜ | |
| Svetlana Iljina | NLKP | |
| Vladimir Ilves | NLKP | |
| Anna Ingerman | NLKP | |
| Kaarel Ird | NLKP | Died in office on 25.12.1986 |
| Aleksandr Ivanov | ÜLKNÜ | |
| Nikolai Ivanov | NLKP | |
| Aili Jalg | NLKP | |
| Evi Järv | | |
| Taimi Jürna | ÜLKNÜ | |
| Linda Jüsmä | | |
| Aave Kahju (Traumann) | | |
| Rein Kaidla | NLKP | |
| Lembit Kaik | NLKP | Died in office on 28.09.1988 |
| Arvo Kaarna | NLKP | |
| Elmar Kallas | NLKP | |
| Ilmar Kallas | NLKP | |
| Eda Kampus | | |
| Maret Kangur | | |
| Malle Karabelnik | ÜLKNÜ | |
| Galina Karpetšenkova | | |
| Natalja Karpjuk | | |
| Arno Kask | NLKP | Left office on 05.01.1988 |
| Kalevi Kaur | ÜLKNÜ | |
| Ulvi Kiho | | |
| Eevi Kiik | NLKP | Left office in 1988 |
| Kaljo Kiisk | NLKP | |
| Üllar Kiisla | NLKP | Left office on 18.05.1987 |
| Valentina Kiiver | | |
| Karl Kimmel | NLKP | |
| Gotfrida Kinjajeva (Šitova) | NLKP | |
| Rein Kirs | NLKP | |
| Roomet Kiudmaa | NLKP | Left office on 05.01.1988 |
| Elle Kivi | NLKP | |
| Ljubov Klimets | ÜLKNÜ | |
| Zoja Kloch | | |
| Oleg Klušin | NLKP | |
| Maire Koidurand | ÜLKNÜ | Left office on 16.01.1987 |
| Urmas Kolla | ÜLKNÜ | |
| Ülo Kõllo | NLKP | |
| Mai Kolossova | NLKP | |
| Vassili Koltakov | ÜLKNÜ | |
| Natalja Komkova | | |
| Georgi Konov | NLKP | Elected on 21.06.1987 |
| Heli Konsap (Siiber) | ÜLKNÜ | |
| Vassili Konstantinov | NLKP | |
| Sulev Kont | NLKP | |
| Valjo Koort | NLKP | |
| Heldi-Melaine Koppel | NLKP | |
| Toomas Kork | NLKP | Elected on 23.10.1988 |
| Jekaterina Korneva | | |
| Galina Kožina | | |
| Jüri Kraft | NLKP | |
| Valeri Kravets | NLKP | |
| Garald Kruger | NLKP | |
| Aleksandr Kudrjavtsev | NLKP | Left office on 09.01.1986 |
| Allan Kullaste | NLKP | |
| Sofia Kunahhova | ÜLKNÜ | |
| Irina Kurletova | NLKP | Removed 18.05.1987 |
| Anne Kurm (Kliimak) | ÜLKNÜ | |
| Ivan Kütsin | | |
| Galina Kutukova (Alisova) | ÜLKNÜ | |
| Anne Kuusing | ÜLKNÜ | |
| Rein Kvell | NLKP | |
| Made Kõllamets | NLKP | |
| Tiit Kõuhkna | NLKP | |
| Vaida Kööp | | |
| Arno Köörna | NLKP | |
| Alfred Kütt | NLKP | |
| Tõnu Laak | NLKP | Elected on 22.02.1987 |
| Jaan Laane | NLKP | |
| Lia Lall | NLKP | |
| Ants Laos | NLKP | |
| Venno Laul | NLKP | |
| Vladimir Lavrov | | |
| Nadežda Lebedeva | NLKP | |
| Peeter Leinmets | ÜLKNÜ | |
| Toomas Leito | NLKP | Elected on 16.06.1985 |
| Leonid Lentsman | NLKP | Left office on 17.11.1989 |
| Maia Leosk | NLKP | |
| Õnne Liiv | ÜLKNÜ | |
| Vello Lind | NLKP | |
| Aleksei Linnasmägi | | |
| Tamara Lis(s)eiskaja | ÜLKNÜ | |
| Valentina Loidap | NLKP | |
| Johannes Lott | NLKP | |
| Aleksandr Lugovoi | ÜLKNÜ | |
| Valentina Lukjantšuk | | |
| Aleksei Lukoškin | NLKP | Elected on 12.02.1989 |
| Harri Lumi | NLKP | |
| Anatolia Lunina | NLKP | |
| Ants Luukas | NLKP | |
| Hugo Maide | NLKP | |
| Svetlana Makarova | NLKP | |
| Vladimir Malkovski | NLKP | Elected on 21.06.1987 |
| Igor Maitsev | NLKP | |
| Rudolf Mannov | NLKP | |
| Elmar Matt | NLKP | |
| Vitali Menšikov | | |
| Linda Merendi | | |
| Arnold Meri | NLKP | |
| Otto Merimaa | NLKP | |
| Roman-Robert Merisalu | NLKP | |
| Johannes Mets | NLKP | |
| Niina Mihhejeva | NLKP | Elected on 21.06.1987 |
| Ene Milvaste | | |
| Valentina Minina | | |
| Vladimir Mižui | NLKP | Elected on 20.10.1985 |
| Ilmar Mitt | NLKP | |
| Boris Moronov | NLKP | |
| Ivan Moskalenko | | |
| Anatoli Moskovtsev | NLKP | |
| Oleg Mošenko | NLKP | |
| Viktor Muhhin | NLKP | Left office on 08.09.1988 |
| Mihhail Murnikov | NLKP | |
| Endel Mändmaa | NLKP | |
| Harald Männik | NLKP | |
| Ääre Männiste | NLKP | |
| Heli Märtin | ÜLKNÜ | |
| Aavo Mölder | NLKP | |
| Ääre Napp | ÜLKNÜ | |
| Ülo Niisuke | NLKP | |
| Kristiine Närep | | |
| Maria Obrizan | | |
| Ruth Ohak | ÜLKNÜ | |
| Andres Oja | NLKP | |
| Anu Otisalu (Nõupuu) | ÜLKNÜ | |
| Vilma Paat | | |
| Peeter Palu | NLKP | |
| Pavel Panfilov | NLKP | |
| Valentin Pankratov | NLKP | |
| Natalja Parafenovitš | ÜLKNÜ | |
| Valeri Paulman | NLKP | |
| Aado Peebo | NLKP | Left office on 18.05.1987 |
| Elmu Peek | NLKP | |
| Tõnu Pijon | | |
| Ülo Püt | NLKP | |
| Aldur Pitk | NLKP | |
| Zoja Plištš (Matjuškina) | ÜLKNÜ | |
| Adolf Popov | NLKP | |
| Veniamin Porõvkin | NLKP | |
| Marina Praporštšikova | NLKP | |
| Nikolai Freiman | NLKP | |
| Vello Prints | NLKP | |
| Leonhard Puksa | NLKP | Left office on 18.05.1987 |
| Ene Põder | ÜLKNÜ | |
| Enn Põldroos | NLKP | Elected on 13.11.1988 |
| Ulja Pärtel | NLKP | |
| Raivo Pütsep | NLKP | |
| Raivo Raap | ÜLKNÜ | |
| Elle Rahu | | |
| Viktor Rajevski | NLKP | |
| Enn Raud | NLKP | Elected on 07.02.1988 |
| Unze Raudmäe-Tauts | | |
| Kersti Rei | NLKP | Elected on 21.06.1987 |
| Vladimir Renser | NLKP | |
| Rein Ristlaan | NLKP | |
| Tauno Ristolainen | | |
| Tatjana Rogušina | | |
| Elle Roosimäe | | |
| Välde Roosmaa | NLKP | |
| Maie Rull | NLKP | |
| Eduard Rõzakov | NLKP | Left office on 18.05.1987 |
| Jüri Räim | NLKP | |
| Väino Rätsep | NLKP | |
| Jaan Rääts | NLKP | |
| Arnold Rüütel | NLKP | |
| Mare Saar | NLKP | |
| Raul Saareke | | |
| Mari Saareta | ÜLKNÜ | |
| Erika Sakkool | NLKP | |
| Urve Saksladu | ÜLKNÜ | |
| Gustav Sarri | NLKP | |
| Bruno Saul | NLKP | |
| Edgar Savisaar | NLKP | Elected on 23.10.1988 |
| Lauri Schmidt | NLKP | |
| Rein Schmidt | | |
| Georgi Semjonov | | |
| Jüri Sepp | ÜLKNÜ | |
| Arvi Siig | NLKP | |
| Enn-Arno Sillar! | NLKP | |
| Robert Simson | NLKP | |
| Valentina Sinkevitš | NLKP | |
| Linda Sirel | NLKP | |
| Ain Seidla | NLKP | |
| Astrid Strantsova | ÜLKNÜ | |
| Pjotr Subbota | NLKP | |
| Raili Suvi | ÜLKNÜ | |
| Tiit Suviste | NLKP | Elected on 22.02.1987 |
| Tamara Šaidulina | | |
| Roman Šeremeta | NLKP | |
| Lev Šišov | NLKP | |
| Nikolai Zahharov | NLKP | Elected on 07.02.1988 |
| Aleksandr Zamahhin | NLKP | |
| Leonid Zarubin | NLKP | Left office on 05.01.1988 |
| Boris Zemtšihhin | ÜLKNÜ | |
| Vladimir Žiltšenkov | | |
| Nikolai Žukov | NLKP | |
| Marina Žuravljova | NLKP | |
| Sirje Taling | | |
| Ülo Tambet | NLKP | |
| Boris Tamm | NLKP | |
| Vivo Tamm | NLKP | |
| Leonhard Tammeväli | NLKP | |
| Madis Tammik | NLKP | |
| Kalev Tammistu | NLKP | |
| Ants Tammleht | NLKP | Elected on 07.02.1988 |
| Jan Tanvel | NLKP | |
| Sergei Tarakanov | NLKP | Elected on 21.06.1987 |
| Peep Tarre | NLKP | Elected on 21.06.1987 |
| Johannes Tasa | | |
| Heino Teder | NLKP | |
| Helju-Mare Terentjeva | NLKP | |
| Rita Teär | | |
| Marko Tibar | NLKP | |
| Vilja Tikk | NLKP | |
| Anatoli Timoštšenko | NLKP | Elected on 21.06.1987 |
| Rein Tobreluts | NLKP | |
| Kuno Todeson | NLKP | |
| Juri Tolmatšev | NLKP | |
| Henno Toming | NLKP | |
| Tarmo Tool | ÜLKNÜ | |
| Arnold Toome | NLKP | Died in office on 16.04.1985 |
| Indrek Toome | NLKP | |
| Erhard Toots | NLKP | |
| Anatoli Tregubov | NLKP | |
| Mihhail Trofimov | NLKP | Left office on 18.05.1987 |
| Eduard Tšerevaško | NLKP | |
| Galina Tšernova | | |
| Vladimir Tšernõšev | NLKP | Died in office on 23.08.1985 |
| Valeri Tšetvergov | NLKP | |
| Genrich Turonok | NLKP | Left office on 18.05.1987 |
| Gustav Tõnspoeg | NLKP | |
| Valter Udam | NLKP | |
| Galina Ugolkova | ÜLKNÜ | |
| Urmas Uibo | ÜLKNÜ | |
| Ülo Uluots | NLKP | Elected on 12.02.1989 |
| Artur-Bernhard Upsi | NLKP | |
| Viktor Vaht | NLKP | |
| Karl Vaino | NLKP | |
| Toomas Varek | NLKP | |
| Jaan Vares | NLKP | |
| Pjotr Vassikov | NLKP | |
| Mare Veiand | | |
| Ahto Vellamaa | NLKP | |
| Aleksandr Vesselov | | |
| Ljudmilla Veskimäe | NLKP | |
| Viljar Veskiväli | NLKP | |
| Tiiä Veting | NLKP | Left office on 26.12.1988 |
| Urmas Vijar | | |
| Irina Vilenberg | | |
| Silvi-Aire Villo | NLKP | |
| Vladimir Vinogradov | NLKP | |
| Rein Virkus | NLKP | |
| Kiira Volkova | NLKP | |
| Vaino Väljas | NLKP | Elected on 23.10.1988 |
