= Lacuna Coil discography =

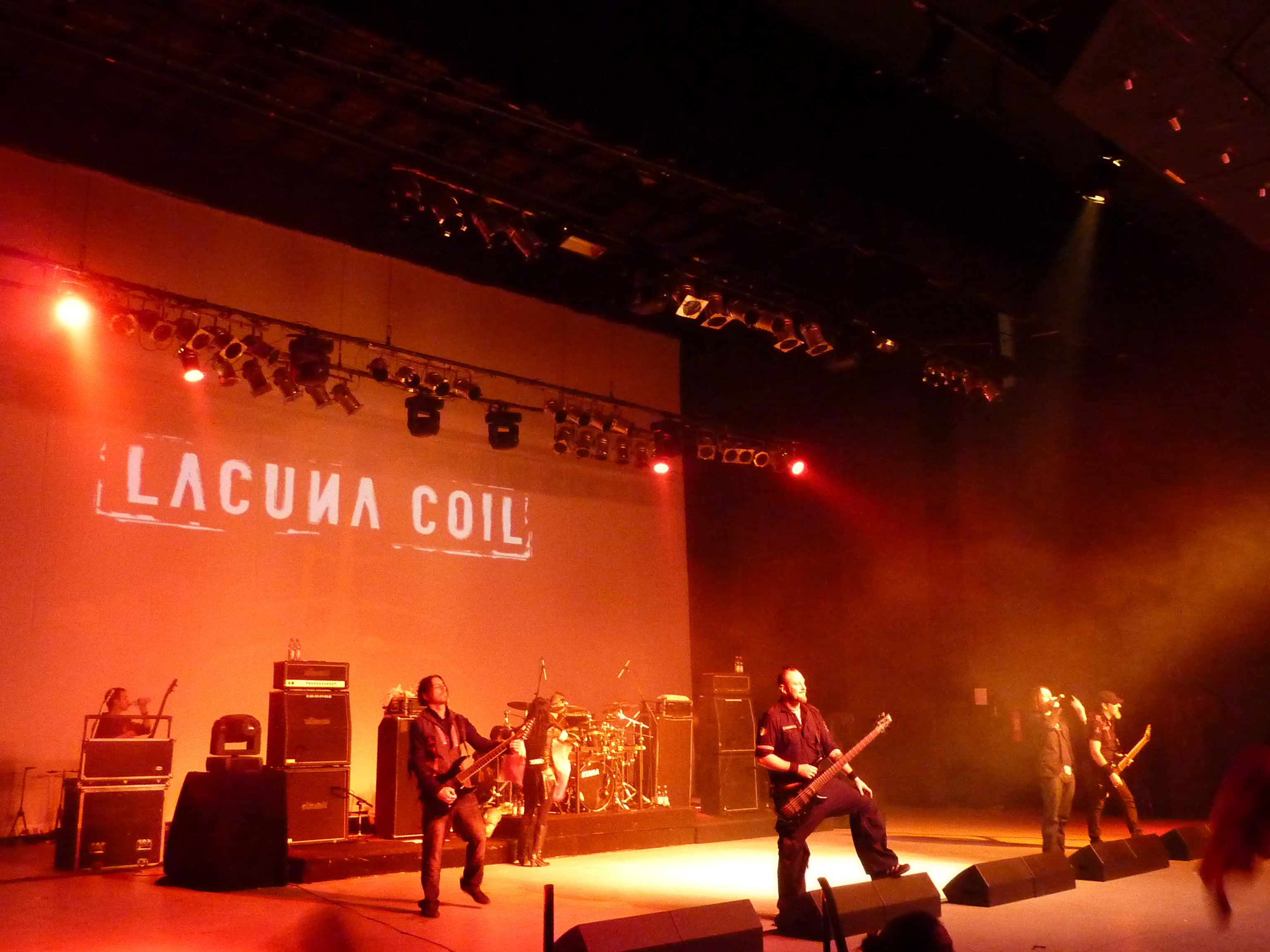
- Lacuna Coil in 2010
- Studio albums: 10
- Extended plays: 2
- Live albums: 3
- Compilation albums: 2
- Singles: 26
- Video albums: 3
- Music videos: 21

The discography of Italian gothic metal band Lacuna Coil consists of nine studio albums, two extended plays, two live albums, two compilation albums, one video album, sixteen singles and sixteen music videos.

== Albums ==
=== Studio albums ===
List of studio albums, with selected chart positions and certifications
| Title | Details | Peak chart positions | | | | | | | | | | Sales | Certifications |
| Title | Details | ITA | AUT | BEL (FL) | FRA | GER | NLD | SPA | SWI | UK | US | Sales | Certifications |
|---|---|---|---|---|---|---|---|---|---|---|---|---|---|
| In a Reverie | Released: 8 June 1999 (US); Label: Century Media; Formats: CD, digital download | — | — | — | — | — | — | — | — | — | — | | |
| Unleashed Memories | Released: 20 March 2001 (US); Label: Century Media; Formats: CD, digital download | — | — | — | — | 72 | — | — | — | — | — | | |
| Comalies | Released: 29 October 2002 (US); Label: Century Media; Formats: CD, LP, digital download | — | — | — | 69 | 45 | — | — | — | — | 178 | US: 300,000+ | |
| Karmacode | Released: 4 April 2006 (US); Label: Century Media; Formats: CD, LP, digital download | 17 | 52 | 83 | 54 | 43 | 86 | — | 61 | 47 | 28 | US: 200,000+ | FIMI: Silver |
| Shallow Life | Released: 21 April 2009 (US); Label: Century Media, EMI; Formats: CD, LP, digital download | 25 | 68 | 60 | 46 | 52 | 76 | 95 | 64 | 42 | 16 | US: 70,000+ | |
| Dark Adrenaline | Released: 24 January 2012 (US); Label: Century Media, EMI; Formats: CD, LP, digital download | 18 | — | 59 | 78 | 36 | 79 | 77 | 53 | 48 | 15 | US: 20,000+ | |
| Broken Crown Halo | Released: 1 April 2014 (US); Label: Century Media, Universal; Formats: CD, LP, digital download | 13 | 55 | 60 | 66 | 40 | 75 | — | 37 | 45 | 27 | US: 13,000+ | |
| Delirium | Released: 27 May 2016; Label: Century Media, Universal; Formats: CD, LP, digital download | 11 | 40 | 29 | 85 | 33 | 94 | 69 | 30 | 42 | 33 | US: 13,000+ | |
| Black Anima | Released: 11 October 2019; Label: Century Media, RED; Formats: CD, digital download | 23 | 37 | 35 | 65 | 15 | — | 22 | 13 | 45 | 87 | US: 10,000+ | |
| Sleepless Empire | Released: 14 February 2025; Label: Century Media; Formats: CD, vinyl, digital download | 30 | 28 | 95 | 94 | 20 | — | — | 14 | — | — | | |
"—" denotes a recording that did not chart or was not released in that territory.

=== Live albums ===
List of live albums, with selected chart positions
| Title | Details | Peak chart positions | | |
| Title | Details | BEL (WA) | GER | UK Rock |
|---|---|---|---|---|
| Visual Karma (Body, Mind and Soul) | Released: 25 November 2008 (US); Label: Century Media; Formats: CD, digital download | — | — | — |
| The 119 Show: Live in London | Released: 9 November 2018; Label: Century Media; Formats: CD, digital download | 114 | 93 | 7 |
| Live from the Apocalypse | Released: 25 June 2021; Label: Century Media; Formats: LP, CD, digital download | 110 | 60 | 16 |
"—" denotes a recording that did not chart or was not released in that territory.

=== Compilation albums ===
List of compilation albums
| Title | Details |
|---|---|
| The EPs | Released: 22 July 2005 (US); Label: Century Media, EMI; Formats: CD, digital download |
| Manifesto of Lacuna Coil | Released: 27 February 2009 (US); Label: Century Media, EMI; Formats: CD, digital download |

=== Video albums ===
List of video albums, with selected chart positions
| Title | Details | Peak chart positions | | | | |
| Title | Details | ITA DVD | AUS DVD | JPN DVD | NLD DVD | US Video |
|---|---|---|---|---|---|---|
| Visual Karma (Body, Mind and Soul) | Released: 25 November 2008 (US); Label: Century Media; Formats: DVD | 12 | — | 216 | — | 26 |
| The 119 Show: Live in London | Released: 9 November 2018; Label: Century Media; Formats: DVD, Blu-ray | — | 11 | — | 20 | — |
| Live from the Apocalypse | Released: 25 June 2021; Label: Century Media; Formats: DVD | — | — | — | — | — |
"—" denotes a recording that did not chart or was not released in that territory.

=== Remix albums ===
List of remix albums
| Title | Album details | Peak chart positions | | | | | | | | | |
| Title | Album details | ITA | AUT | BEL (FL) | FRA | GER | NLD | SPA | SWI | UK | US |
|---|---|---|---|---|---|---|---|---|---|---|---|
| Comalies XX | Released: 14 October 2022 (US, EU); Label: Century Media, RED; Format: CD, LP, cassette, digital download, streaming | — | — | — | — | 45 | — | — | 25 | — | — |

== Extended plays ==
List of extended plays
| Title | Details |
|---|---|
| Lacuna Coil | Released: 7 April 1998 (US); Label: Century Media; Formats: CD, digital download |
| Halflife | Released: 18 November 2000 (US); Label: Century Media; Formats: CD, digital download |

== Singles ==
| Title | Year | Peak chart positions | | | | | | | | | Album |
| Title | Year | ITA | ITA Indie | AUT | CZE | SPA | UK | UK Rock | US Act. Rock | US Main. Rock | Album |
|---|---|---|---|---|---|---|---|---|---|---|---|
| "Heaven's a Lie" | 2002 | — | — | — | — | — | — | — | — | — | Comalies |
| "Swamped" | 2004 | — | — | 22 | — | — | — | — | — | — | Comalies |
| "Our Truth" | 2006 | 23 | — | — | — | 18 | 40 | 1 | 32 | 36 | Karmacode |
| "Enjoy the Silence" | 2006 | 27 | — | — | 13 | — | 41 | 3 | — | — | Karmacode |
| "Closer" | 2006 | 50 | — | — | — | — | — | 5 | — | — | Karmacode |
| "Within Me" | 2006 | 44 | — | — | — | — | — | — | — | — | Karmacode |
| "Spellbound" | 2009 | — | — | — | — | — | — | — | 24 | 30 | Shallow Life |
| "I Like It" | 2009 | — | — | — | — | — | — | — | — | — | Shallow Life |
| "I Won't Tell You" | 2009 | — | — | — | — | — | — | — | 32 | 35 | Shallow Life |
| "Wide Awake" | 2009 | — | — | — | — | — | — | — | — | — | Shallow Life |
| "Trip the Darkness" | 2011 | — | — | — | — | — | — | — | 23 | 28 | Dark Adrenaline |
| "Fire" | 2012 | — | — | — | — | — | — | — | — | — | Dark Adrenaline |
| "Losing My Religion" | 2012 | — | — | — | — | — | — | — | — | — | Dark Adrenaline |
| "Die & Rise" | 2014 | — | — | — | — | — | — | — | — | 32 | Broken Crown Halo |
| "Nothing Stands in Our Way" | 2014 | — | — | — | — | — | — | — | — | — | Broken Crown Halo |
| "I Forgive (But I Won't Forget Your Name)" | 2014 | — | — | — | — | — | — | — | — | — | Broken Crown Halo |
| "The House of Shame" | 2016 | — | — | — | — | — | — | — | — | — | Delirium |
| "Delirium" | 2016 | — | — | — | — | — | — | — | — | — | Delirium |
| "Ghost in the Mist" | 2016 | — | — | — | — | — | — | — | — | — | Delirium |
| "Naughty Christmas" | 2016 | — | — | — | — | — | — | — | — | — | Non-album singles |
| "Mayday" (Rezophonic featuring Lacuna Coil) | 2018 | — | — | — | — | — | — | — | — | — | Non-album singles |
| "Blood, Tears, Dust" | 2018 | — | — | — | — | — | — | — | — | — | The 119 Show: Live in London |
| "Layers of Time" | 2019 | — | — | — | — | — | — | — | — | — | Black Anima |
| "Reckless" | 2019 | — | — | — | — | — | — | — | — | — | Black Anima |
| "Save Me" | 2019 | — | — | — | — | — | — | — | — | — | Black Anima |
| "Bad Things" | 2021 | — | — | — | — | — | — | — | — | — | Live From The Apocalypse |
| "Tight Rope XX" | 2022 | — | — | — | — | — | — | — | — | — | Comalies XX |
| "Never Dawn" | 2023 | — | — | — | — | — | — | — | — | — | Sleepless Empire |
| "In the Mean Time" (feat. Ash Costello) | 2024 | — | 27 | — | — | — | — | — | — | — | Sleepless Empire |
| "Hosting the Shadow" (feat. Randy Blythe) | 2024 | — | — | — | — | — | — | — | — | — | Sleepless Empire |
| "Oxygen" | 2024 | — | — | — | — | — | — | — | — | — | Sleepless Empire |
| "These Scars Won't Define Us" (Machine Head featuring In Flames, Lacuna Coil & Unearth) | 2024 | — | — | — | — | — | — | — | — | — | Non-album singles |
| "Gravity" | 2025 | — | 15 | — | — | — | — | — | — | — | Sleepless Empire |
| "I Wish You Were Dead" | 2025 | — | 6 | — | — | — | — | — | — | — | Sleepless Empire |
"—" denotes a recording that did not chart or was not released in that territory.

== Music videos ==
List of music videos, showing year released and directors
| Title | Year | Director(s) |
|---|---|---|
| "Heaven's a Lie" (version 1) | 2002 | Luigi Sabadini |
| "Heaven's a Lie" (version 2) | 2003 | Chade Seide |
| "Heaven's a Lie" (version 3) | 2003 | Patric Ullaeus |
| "Swamped" | 2004 | Patric Ullaeus |
| "Our Truth" | 2006 | Nathan Cox, Zach Merck |
| "Enjoy the Silence" | 2006 | Nathan Cox, Zach Merck |
| "Closer" | 2006 | Nathan Cox, Zach Merck |
| "Within Me" | 2007 | Kal Karman |
| "Spellbound (Performance Version) & (Story Version)" | 2009 | Roberto Cinardi |
| "I Like It" | 2009 | Kevin James Custer |
| "I Won't Tell You" | 2010 | Roberto Cinardi |
| "Trip the Darkness" | 2011 | Sitcom Soldiers |
| "End of Time" | 2012 | Roberto Cinardi |
| "I Forgive (But I Won't Forget Your Name)" | 2014 | Sitcom Soldiers |
| "Nothing Stands in Our Way" | 2014 | Daniel Kuykendall |
| "Delirium" | 2016 | Michael Winkler |
| "Blood, Tears, Dust" | 2017 | Cosimo Alemà |
| "You Love Me 'Cause I Hate You" | 2017 | Cosimo Alemà |
| "Layers of Time" | 2019 | Roberto Cinardi |
| "Reckless" | 2019 | Roberto Cinardi |
| "Save Me" (Live) | 2020 | Isabella D'Alessandro |
| "Bad Things" (Live) | 2021 | Jonathan Bonvini |
| "Apocalypse" (Live) | 2021 | Jonathan Bonvini |
| "Veneficium" (Live) | 2021 | Jonathan Bonvini |
| "Tight Rope XX" | 2022 | Trilathera |
| "Swamped XX" | 2022 | Trilathera |
| "In the Mean Time" | 2024 | Patric Ullaeus |
| "Oxygen" | 2024 | Daniele Tofani |
| "Gravity" | 2025 | Martina L. McLean |
| "I Wish You Were Dead" | 2025 | Martina L. McLean |
| "Hosting the Shadow" | 2025 | Martina L. McLean and Mattia Castiglia |
