= Manifesto of Lacuna Coil =

Compilation album by Lacuna Coil
- Released: 27 February 2009
- Genre: Alternative metal, gothic metal
- Length: 62:40
- Label: Century Media

Lacuna Coil chronology
Visual Karma (Body, Mind and Soul) (2008)	Manifesto of Lacuna Coil (2009)	Shallow Life (2009)

Manifesto of Lacuna Coil is the second compilation album by Italian gothic metal band Lacuna Coil, released on 27 February 2009. Tracks are taken from the first four studio albums; In a Reverie, Unleashed Memories, Comalies & Karmacode, as well as from their two EPs; Lacuna Coil & Halflife.

The album was rated 4 out of 5 stars by AllMusic.

== Track listing ==
All songs written by Lacuna Coil, except "Enjoy the Silence" written by Martin Gore

Track listing
No.	Title	Length
1.	"Our Truth"	4:03
2.	"Closer"	3:02
3.	"Within Me"	3:39
4.	"Enjoy the Silence"	4:06
5.	"Swamped"	4:00
6.	"Heaven's a Lie"	4:47
7.	"Daylight Dancer"	3:50
8.	"To Live Is to Hide"	4:35
9.	"Cold Heritage"	5:23
10.	"Senzafine"	3:54
11.	"Honeymoon Suite"	4:31
12.	"My Wings"	3:45
13.	"Falling Again"	5:07
14.	"No Need to Explain"	3:40
15.	"The Secret..."	4:18
Total length:		62:40
