= Shallow Life =

Studio album by Lacuna Coil
- Released: 1 April 2009
- Recorded: 2008
- Studio: NRG, Los Angeles, California
- Genre: Gothic metal, electronic rock, hard rock
- Length: 43:59
- Label: Century Media, EMI
- Producer: Don Gilmore

Lacuna Coil chronology
Visual Karma (Body, Mind and Soul) (2008)	Shallow Life (2009)	Dark Adrenaline (2012)

Singles from Shallow Life
- 1. "Spellbound" Released: 24 February 2009; 2. "I Like It" Released: 29 June 2009; 3. "I Won't Tell You" Released: 5 October 2009; 4. "Wide Awake" Released: 30 November 2009

Shallow Life is the fifth studio album by Italian gothic metal band Lacuna Coil. The album was released on 1 April 2009 in Europe, and North America through Century Media Records, and EMI. As of September 2009, it has sold over 75,000 copies in the U.S. and 225,000 worldwide.

== Background ==
The album was recorded in Autumn 2008 at NRG Recording Studios in Los Angeles, California, with producer Don Gilmore. According to magazine Rock Sound the album would have some Arabic influences. Scabbia noted that the album "feels more rock" and that it is "the perfect mixture between our old European sound and something more modern...some of it's very heavy. The most amazing this is, we've been able to improve everything about Lacuna Coil without taking away anything good or doing something that doesn't belong." Shallow Life was reportedly set to be the band's first concept album, containing references toward superficial lifestyles in the world today. The song "Spellbound" was debuted live at the Soundwave Music Festival in February 2009. The song "Not Enough" was released as a free download on the Italian Music website XL with the backstage of Spellbound video on 1 April 2009. In the beginning of April the song "I'm Not Afraid" was released as airplay on Russian radios.

On 8 April 2009, Lacuna Coil posted all 12 tracks from their album to listen to on their MySpace profile page for one week only.

On 14 April 2009, the band created a poll on their MySpace profile for fans to choose the second single, involving nine songs from Shallow Life.

Shallow Life was re-released as a double disc deluxe edition with new artwork from 22–27 January 2010 in Europe, and 22 February 2010 in North America. The bonus disc contains live and acoustic recordings and previously unreleased studio tracks.

== Reception ==
Professional ratings
Aggregate scores
Source	Rating
Metacritic	68/100
Review scores
Source	Rating
AllMusic	2.5/5 stars
Kerrang!	3/5 stars
PopMatters	6/10
Sputnikmusic	3/5 stars
Metal Hammer	6/10 stars
Alternative Press	3/5 stars
Rock Sound	8/10 stars

The Album received mixed reviews from music critics. AllMusic writer, gave a mixed review to the album and rated it as two-and-a-half stars out of five and wrote: "In all fairness, Shallow Life, does come on very much as expected based on Lacuna Coil's preceding career arc, and many observers would argue that backtracking isn't the solution either if a band is to prosper in the long run -- but it may have to be here, given the underwhelming sales and vociferous critical backlash bestowed upon the album." Kerrang! magazine gave it three out of five, stating: "It may not stand along Karmacode in ten years' time...but it is an album for today." Rock Sound gave them eight out of ten saying that the album is "Edgier, racier and more accessible than almost anything they've done to date, 'Shallow Life' is the sound of a band that's reaping the rewards of over a decade in the business". Despite the mixed reaction, the track "Wide Awake" received near universal praise.

== Track listing ==
All lyrics are written by Lacuna Coil & Don Gilmore; all music is composed by Lacuna Coil.

No.	Title	Length
1.	"Survive"	3:34
2.	"I Won't Tell You"	3:49
3.	"Not Enough"	3:40
4.	"I’m Not Afraid"	3:22
5.	"I Like It"	3:42
6.	"Underdog"	3:40
7.	"The Pain"	4:00
8.	"Spellbound"	3:21
9.	"Wide Awake"	3:51
10.	"The Maze"	3:38
11.	"Unchained"	3:22
12.	"Shallow Life"	4:00
Total length:		43:59

Bonus tracks

Limited Edition Digipack & iTunes edition
No.	Title	Length
13.	"Oblivion"	4:08
Total length:		48:07

Japanese edition
No.	Title	Length
14.	"The Last Goodbye" (from Saw VI)	4:15
Total length:		49:03

Play.com Exclusive CD & DVD Digipack
No.	Title	Length
1.	"Video for lead single "Spellbound"" (Exclusive to UK customers who ordered through Play.com)

Special Edition (Double disc)

Special edition: Disc 2 (Disc 1 is the same of the standard release)
No.	Title	Length
1.	"The Last Goodbye"	4:15
2.	"Leaving Alone"	4:09
3.	"Oblivion"	4:08
4.	"Spellbound" (acoustic)	2:52
5.	"Closer" (acoustic)	3:36
6.	"Within Me" (acoustic)	3:14
7.	"Survive" (live)	3:47
8.	"I'm Not Afraid" (live)	3:34
9.	"I Won't Tell You" (live)	3:53
10.	"Tight Rope" (live)	4:22
11.	"Fragments of Faith" (live)	4:18
12.	"The Game" (live)	3:39
Total length:		45:47

== Singles ==
- "Spellbound": "Spellbound" was released on 20 March 2009, via digital download. No physical release is scheduled. "Spellbound" was released on the "Liquid Metal" and "Octane" stations of Sirius XM satellite radio on 14 February and was released officially on their MySpace on 24 February.
- "I Like It": The single was chosen after a poll on their MySpace profile, involving nine other songs from Shallow Life. The video for "I Like It" was filmed in May. The music video was shot in Kansas City by the American director Kevin James Custer and it was released 29 June 2009. Despite being released as a single, however, it has never been performed live.
- "I Won't Tell You": The single was released on 5 October 2009 on American mainstream rock radio stations. The video for "I Won't Tell You" was filmed on December 5 in Milan by the Italian director SaKu, who also directed the video for "Spellbound." The music video was released on the band's official MySpace page on 12 January 2010.
- "Wide Awake": The single was released on 30 November 2009 for Italian radio stations as a special single for the holidays.

== Credits and personnel ==
Lacuna Coil

- Andrea Ferro - male vocals
- Cristina Scabbia - female vocals
- Marco "Maus" Biazzi - lead guitar
- Cristiano "Pizza" Migliore - rhythm guitar
- Marco Coti Zelati - bass, keyboards
- Cristiano "CriZ" Mozzati - drums

Production

- Don Gilmore - production and engineering
- Mark Kiczula- assistant recording engineering
- Josh Newell- studio assistance
- Recorded at NRG studios, North Hollywood, CA
- Mastered by Ted Jensen at Sterling Sound

Other personnel

- Chris Denner - band photography
- Art direction, design & production by Stefan Wibbeke, Media Logistics GmbH, medialogistics.com

Publishing

- All music by: Lacuna Coil
- All keyboards by: Marco Coti Zelati
- All lyrics by: Lacuna Coil / Don Gilmore
- All music and lyrics published by Lacuna Coil / High Speed Chase, ASCAP
- Administered by Kobalt

Other credits

- Management: Adam (DOOM) Sewell for Riot Rock Management
- Booking: Paul Ryan (UK), Tim Borror (US) for The Agency Group
- Legal Representation: Michael Toorock, Toorock and Rosen, LLP
- Tour Management: Mark "Gus" Guy

== Charts ==
Chart (2009)	Provider(s)	Peak position	Sales/shipments
Australian Albums Chart	ARIA	78	
Austrian Albums Chart	IFPI	68	
Belgian (Flanders) Albums Chart	IFPI	74	
Belgian (Wallonia) Albums Chart	IFPI	60	
Canadian Albums Chart	Nielsen SoundScan	44	
Dutch Albums Chart	IFPI	76	
European Albums Chart		39	
French Albums Chart	SNEP	46	
German Albums Chart	Media Control	52	
Greek Albums Chart	IFPI	15	
Irish Albums Chart	IRMA	55	
Italian Albums Chart	FIMI	25	
Japanese Albums Chart	Oricon	76	
Spanish Albums Chart	PROMUSICAE	95	
Swiss Albums Chart	Media Control	64	
UK Albums Chart	BPI/OCC	42	
UK Rock Chart	BPI/OCC	2	
US Billboard 200	RIAA	16	75,000
US Billboard Top Rock Albums	RIAA	2	75,000

== Release history ==
Country	Date
Italy	1 April 2009
Germany	1 April 2009
Austria	1 April 2009
Switzerland	1 April 2009
Benelux	1 April 2009
United Kingdom	20 April 2009
France	20 April 2009
Greece	20 April 2009
Denmark	20 April 2009
Norway	20 April 2009
North America	21 April 2009
Spain	21 April 2009
Portugal	21 April 2009
Sweden	22 April 2009
Finland	22 April 2009
Hungary	22 April 2009
Japan	20 May 2009
