= Black Anima =

Studio album by Lacuna Coil
- Released: 11 October 2019
- Recorded: May 2019 – June 2019
- Studio: BRX Studio
- Genre: Gothic metal; metalcore; nu metal
- Length: 45:14
- Label: Century Media and RED Music
- Producer: Marco Coti Zelati

Lacuna Coil chronology
Delirium (2016)	Black Anima (2019)	Comalies XX (2022)

Singles from Black Anima
- 1. "Layers of Time" Released: 26 July 2019; 2. "Reckless" Released: 13 September 2019; 3. "Save Me" Released: 4 October 2019

Professional ratings
Review scores
Source	Rating
AllMusic	4/5 stars
Blabbermouth.net	6/10
Kerrang!	4/5 stars
Metal Hammer	4/5 stars
Spill Magazine	8/10

Black Anima is the ninth studio album by Italian gothic metal band Lacuna Coil. It was released by Century Media Records on 11 October 2019. Recording took place BRX Studio in Milan, Italy. It is the first album to feature drummer Richard Meiz, also part of Italian symphonic death metal band, Genus Ordinis Dei. On 15 July 2019, previous drummer Ryan Blake Folden announced via Instagram that he did not play on Black Anima, nor would he be touring outside of the US. Richard Meiz was officially announced as the new drummer of Lacuna Coil on the Genus Ordinis Dei Facebook page.

The lead single from the album, "Layers of Time", was released on 26 July 2019. The band embarked on the Disease of the Anima tour to promote the album with co-headliner, All That Remains and special guests, Bad Omens, Toothgrinder, Uncured, and Eximious.

== Background ==
Lacuna Coil released their eighth studio album, Delirium, on 27 May 2016. To promote the record, the band embarked on several headlining tours in United States, Europe, South America with acts such as Halestorm, 9ELECTRIC, Stitched Up Heart, and Butcher Babies. In August 2017, they also co-headlined on The Ultimate Principle Tour with Dutch symphonic metal band Epica. After the album cycle for Delirium ended, the band went on to play a one night 20th Anniversary show in London that took place on 19 January 2018. This live performance would later become the live DVD, The 119 Show: Live In London released in November 2018.

In May 2019, female vocalist Cristina Scabbia teased the band's ninth studio album through Instagram by announcing they were entering the studio to record. On 5 July 2019, the band's social media accounts went black. In the following days, the band's social media accounts uploaded two Furthark styled symbols which resembled the letters B and A. Only 8 July 2019; the group uploaded an image of the album's title and release date to their official website, official social media accounts, and personal social media accounts. The band's record label, Century Media Records website released a press release with Scabbia's explanation of the title. She writes, “Black Anima is all of us. It's you and it's me, it's everything we hide and fiercely expose to a world that's halfway asleep. It is the fogged mirror we are peering into searching for the truth. It's sacrifice and pain, it's justice and fear, it's fury and revenge, it's past and future... Human beings in the magnificence of a disturbing ambiguity. The black core that balances it all… as without darkness, light would never exist. We proudly present to you our new work and can’t wait to welcome you in our embrace. We are the Anima.

On 15 July 2019, the band uploaded a promotional photo to their social media accounts. On 19 July 2019, the album artwork was revealed.

== Promotion ==
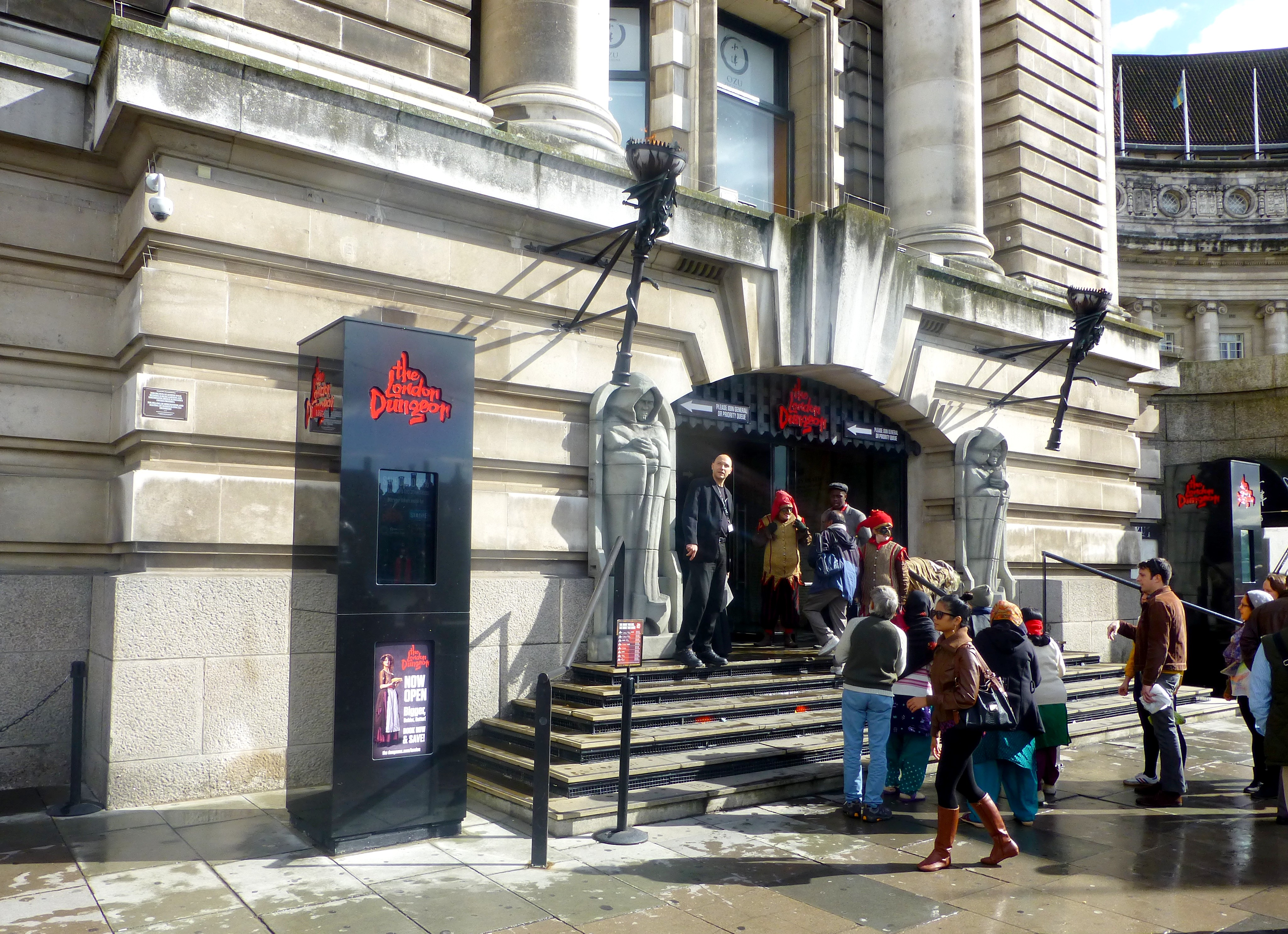
A special listening session of the album was held at the London Dungeon, in England.

On 2 July 2019, New York based music store, Looney Tunes, announced a meet and greet with both vocalists, Cristina Scabbia and Andrea Ferro to take place on 25 July 2019. On their official website, they wrote; "Those who attend this event will be the FIRST people in the US to hear tracks from this new album! You will have an opportunity to meet the band take a picture with our professional photographer on hand and get an exclusive event poster signed by the band!". Fans would have to pre-order the Black Anima CD or one of two vinyl records in black or pink. This was the first pre-order of the album.

On 17 July 2019, the band announced an "exclusive album listening experience" sponsored by Century Media Records and Metal Hammer to take place on 6 September 2019 at tourist attraction, London Dungeon in Westminster Bridge Road, London. Editor Merlin Alderslade of Metal Hammer writes; "Metal Hammer have been proud supporters of Lacuna Coil for two decades, so when we were looking for a band to help us create something special at the awesome London Dungeon, it didn't take long for them to enter the conversation.:"

On 25 July 2019, Rolling Stone announced that Lacuna Coil would join artists such as Third Eye Blind, Spiritualized, and Saves The Day to take part of the sixth annual Ten Bands One Cause pink vinyl campaign, a charity that provides support for cancer patients and their loved ones. The 2019 releases will coincide with National Breast Cancer Awareness Month in October, and all proceeds will benefit Gilda's Club in New York City.

=== Tour ===
To promote the album, Lacuna Coil joined All That Remains on a co-headlining tour, Disease of the Anima beginning on 15 September 2019, at Webster Hall in New York City. Ferro said, "This is a killer bill that will blow your mind! We can't wait to hit your stages again and see you all,"

Following the Disease of the Anima tour, Eluveitie will accompany Lacuna Coil on a European and UK headline tour beginning on 2 November 2019, at the Demodé Club in Bari, Italy. Adds Ferro, "That's why we are really excited to team up with Eluveitie and our buddies in Infected Rain for this fantastic tour package. The bill is pretty diverse and interesting and we can't wait to bring it around Europe. We will play some of our classic songs and introduce some new tunes! We know this tour is going to be rocking, and we know the fans are going to enjoy this as much as we are!" [CM]

=== Singles ===
"Layers of Time", the album's first single, was released digitally and on streaming services on 26 July 2019. Lacuna Coil teamed up with director Roberto Cinardi (aka SaKu) to shoot the video for "Layers of Time". SaKu previously worked with the band for other videos such as "Spellbound", "I Won't Tell You", "End of Time" and the short film for their album Dark Adrenaline, Dark Passengers.

== Music and themes ==
In a July 2019 interview at Rock Fest with hardDrive Radio, Scabbia said that anima was the Italian word for soul, making the record's title translation black soul. She described the new music as "heavier and darker" joking that the explanation was cliché but argued, "It's actually the truth!"

She also told interviewer Lou Brutus "It'll be surprising to a lot of people because we experimented with a lot of things differently, vocally and musically… Someone told us that it almost sounds like if you're entering a cathedral and you find a spaceship inside. It's a strange combination of sounds that are really difficult to describe."

Elaborating on the concept, Ferro said, "It's a very complex record with a lot of different flavors. We experiment [sic?] a lot on the lyrics about growing up, about our lives, experiencing loss or other things you get to know in your mature age. We felt a connection with people that aren't with us anymore, so we decided to talk about this connection that we feel beyond life." Scabbia also revealed that the record would "revolve around a book."

The album received generally favorable reviews from music critics. Allmusic's critic Neil Z. Young gave the album a positive review, particularly praising the song "Layers of Time", saying that "Cristina Scabbia and Andrea Ferro deliver a typically blockbuster performance" on the song. He ends the review stating that "Black Anima cuts to the core of human emotion and provides a welcome maturation for the band".

== Track listing ==
All song written and composed by Lacuna Coil.

No.	Title	Length
1.	"Anima Nera"	2:27
2.	"Sword of Anger"	3:55
3.	"Reckless"	3:06
4.	"Layers of Time"	4:08
5.	"Apocalypse"	4:17
6.	"Now or Never"	4:41
7.	"Under the Surface"	4:14
8.	"Veneficium"	6:11
9.	"The End Is All I Can See"	4:16
10.	"Save Me"	4:37
11.	"Black Anima"	3:23
Total length:		45:14

Bonus tracks version
No.	Title	Length
12.	"Black Feathers"	4:12
13.	"Through the Flames"	5:30
14.	"Black Dried Up Heart"	3:49
Total length:		58:46

== Charts ==
Chart (2019)	Peak position
Australian Albums (ARIA)	47
Austrian Albums (Ö3 Austria)	37
Belgian Albums (Ultratop Flanders)	35
Belgian Albums (Ultratop Wallonia)	28
Canadian Albums (Billboard)	96
French Albums (SNEP)	65
German Albums (Offizielle Top 100)	15
Italian Albums (FIMI)	23
Scottish Albums (OCC)	10
Spanish Albums (PROMUSICAE)	22
Swiss Albums (Schweizer Hitparade)	13
UK Albums (OCC)	45
US Billboard 200	87
