= Sleepless Empire =

Studio album by Lacuna Coil
- Released: 14 February 2025
- Recorded: April–July 2024
- Studio: SPVN (Italy)
- Genre: Gothic metal; metalcore
- Length: 46:41
- Label: Century Media
- Producer: Marco Coti Zelati

Lacuna Coil chronology
Comalies XX (2022)	Sleepless Empire (2025)

Singles from Sleepless Empire
- 1. "Never Dawn" Released: 15 June 2023; 2. "In the Mean Time" Released: 18 April 2024; 3. "Hosting the Shadow" Released: 31 July 2024; 4. "Oxygen" Released: 2 October 2024; 5. "Gravity" Released: 9 January 2025; 6. "I Wish You Were Dead" Released: 10 February 2025

Sleepless Empire is the tenth studio album by Italian gothic metal band Lacuna Coil, released on 14 February 2025, through Century Media Records. It follows their 2019 album, Black Anima, and marks a return to a heavier, more experimental musical direction. The album was preceded by five singles: "Never Dawn", "In the Mean Time", "Hosting the Shadow", "Oxygen", and "I Wish You Were Dead".

== Background and recording ==
Writing for Sleepless Empire began in late 2022, following the completion of Comalies XX, a reimagined version of their 2002 album Comalies. In a September 2023 interview with KNAC, lead vocalist Cristina Scabbia revealed that the band had written five or six songs but decided to delay recording a full album, explaining, "We really base our inspiration on life, on experiences, and to be honest, we didn't want to write a record about the pandemic. We wanted to go out again, meet people, live experiences, live life, and get ready to bring everything into our music again. So, we've collected a ton of material."

Co-lead vocalist Andrea Ferro added that revisiting Comalies influenced the band's creative direction, explaining, "Sometimes going back to work on Comalies brings back memories or reminds you of how you felt when you first created those songs. That can be inspirational for an eventual next album. Maybe some of the atmosphere stays with you because you've been rethinking and reworking it."

Recording for Sleepless Empire took place at SPVN Studios in Como, Lombardy, Italy, throughout 2024, with longtime bassist and primary songwriter Marco Coti Zelati handling production. In a February 2025 interview with The Razor's Edge Podcast, Ferro reflected on the challenges leading up to the album, stating, "It took us a long time to complete this album. Part of that was due to the two years of COVID-19 pandemic, which kind of postponed everything—everyone's lives, really. But even after that, it took us a while to regain real motivation and inspiration to work on a full new record. That's why we did Comalies XX, which gave us the drive to go back to the studio and work properly again—to restart, to reboot the machine into motion."

Ferro also revealed that finding the album title and conceptual vision was a critical step in shaping the record, explaining, "Normally, we start with Marco, the main songwriter. He needs to have a title and a vision, like an image, that portrays the record. It doesn't necessarily have to be the final cover or artwork—it can act as a sort of totem. Once we found that, we really started to flow with creativity and composition, working on all the arrangements and then the lyrics, focusing on the concept. It was a very long process because we had to put the machine back in motion."

The album features guest vocal appearances from Randy Blythe of Lamb of God, and Ash Costello of New Years Day. The band described these collaborations as an opportunity to add new textures while remaining true to their core sound.

The band emphasized that Sleepless Empire represents an evolution of their sound while embracing a darker, heavier approach, drawing from both their past and the modern world.

== Lineup changes ==
On 17 June 2024, Lacuna Coil announced the departure of longtime guitarist Diego Cavallotti. The band thanked him for his contributions and wished him well in future endeavors.

Cavallotti later addressed his departure, stating that it was not due to dissatisfaction or a desire to pursue other opportunities but a decision he accepted in good faith. He expressed gratitude toward the band and fans and confirmed that he would continue his musical career.

Following his departure, Lacuna Coil introduced Daniele Salomone of the band Inverno as their new touring guitarist. Salomone made his live debut with the band on 4 August 2024, at Rockstadt Extreme Fest in Râșnov, Romania.

== Music and lyrics ==
Musically, Sleepless Empire incorporates gothic metal, alternative metal, and electronic influences, maintaining the band's signature dual-vocal dynamic. Andrea Ferro emphasized that the band embraced a heavier sound while also adapting to modern production techniques.

== Reception ==
Professional ratings
Review scores
Source	Rating
Blabbermouth.net	8/10
Kerrang!	4/5 stars
Metal Hammer	4/5 stars
Distorted Sound	6/10
Rock Hard	8/10
Spill Magazine	4/5 stars

Sleepless Empire received positive reviews from critics, with praise directed toward its heavier direction, refined production, and the dynamic vocal interplay between Andrea Ferro, and Cristina Scabbia. Several reviewers highlighted the album's ability to evolve Lacuna Coil's sound while maintaining their signature gothic metal style.

On Metacritic, which assigns a normalized rating out of 100 to reviews from mainstream critics, the album has a weighted average score of 82 based on six reviews, indicating "generally favorable reviews". Kerrang! awarded the album 4 out of 5 stars, commending its "boldly heavier approach" and describing "I Wish You Were Dead" as a "goth anthem sharp-fanged with irony." The review praised the guest appearances of Randy Blythe, and Ash Costello but emphasized that the album remains "undeniably Lacuna Coil."

Writing for Rock 'N' Load Magazine, Conor awarded Sleepless Empire a perfect 10/10, calling it "one of Lacuna Coil's best" and praising its "monstrous wall of sound." The review highlighted "Scarecrow", "Hosting the Shadow", and "In the Mean Time" as standout tracks, describing the album as "a masterclass in balancing ferocity with melody."

Metal-Heads.de praised the album for staying true to Lacuna Coil's roots while integrating new influences. The review described "The Siege" as a "powerful and ethereal" opener that sets the tone, and "Gravity" as a track that leans more on the band's older melodic side. It concluded that the album "successfully bridges the past and present" of Lacuna Coil.

MetalTalk hailed Sleepless Empire as "ferociously powerful" and a potential "career best" for the band. The review noted that the album leans further into its heavier elements while maintaining an "elegant balance between chaos and control." Songs such as "The Siege", "Oxygen", and "In Nomine Patris" were praised for their intensity, while *Sleep Paralysis* was described as "brooding and cinematic."

Overall, Sleepless Empire was praised for its heavier sound, vocal dynamics, and polished production, with multiple reviewers regarding it as a strong evolution for Lacuna Coil. Critics noted that the band "continues to redefine gothic metal for a modern audience" while remaining "undeniably themselves."

== Commercial performance ==
The single "Oxygen" from Lacuna Coil's Sleepless Empire album gained significant airplay on SiriusXM's Liquid Metal station, accumulating over 100 plays in a span of 30 days. Additionally, the song was featured on multiple FM radio stations across the United States, including KMFA Rock 102.1, 98 KUPD, and WRRV 92.7 FM. Other tracks from the album, including "Hosting the Shadow" and "Never Dawn", also received airplay on these stations.

== Track listing ==
All lyrics are written by Cristina Scabbia and Andrea Ferro; all music is composed by Marco Coti Zelati.

Sleepless Empire track listing
No.	Title	Length
1.	"The Siege"	4:23
2.	"Oxygen"	3:44
3.	"Scarecrow"	4:47
4.	"Gravity"	4:02
5.	"I Wish You Were Dead"	2:51
6.	"Hosting the Shadow" (featuring Randy Blythe)	4:21
7.	"In Nomine Patris"	4:52
8.	"Sleepless Empire"	4:00
9.	"Sleep Paralysis"	5:19
10.	"In the Mean Time" (featuring Ash Costello)	3:33
11.	"Never Dawn"	4:49
Total length:		46:41

== Singles ==
The album was preceded by six singles:

- "Never Dawn" – Released on 15 June 2023, originally written for the tabletop game expansion Zombicide: White Death and recorded before the rest of the album.
- "In the Mean Time" – Released on 18 April 2024, featuring Ash Costello of New Years Day, the following day, the music video, filmed in Sweden on 4 March 2024, by director Patric Ullaeus (who had previously directed the videos for "Heaven's a Lie", and "Swamped"), was released.
- "Hosting the Shadow" – Released on 31 July 2024, featuring Randy Blythe of Lamb of God.
- "Oxygen" – Released on 2 October 2024, alongside the album's official announcement. On October 9, the video was released. It was filmed in Latina, Lazio, Italy, by Daniele Tofani, who had previously directed the videos for Tight Rope XX and Swamped XX.
- "Gravity" - Released on 9 January 2025, the song was accompanied by a music video filmed in Rome on November 30, 2024, and directed by Martina L. McLean.
- "I Wish You Were Dead" – Released on 10 February 2025. On February 13, 2025, the video for the song was released. It was filmed on January 27 at the San Francesco Church in Capranica, Lazio, Italy, and directed by Martina L. McLean.

== Personnel ==
Credits adapted from the album's liner notes.

=== Lacuna Coil ===
- Andrea Ferro – vocals
- Cristina Scabbia – vocals
- Marco "Maki" Coti Zelati – bass, guitars, choirs, keyboards, synthesizers
- Richard Meiz – drums, synthesizers, synthesizer sounds

=== Additional contributors ===
- Marco "Maki" Coti Zelati – production, editing, mixing
- Randy Blythe – vocals on "Hosting the Shadow"
- Ash Costello – vocals on "In the Mean Time"
- Daniele Salomone – guitars on "Scarecrow", guitar solo on "In Nomine Patris" and "Sleep Paralysis", guitar engineering, editing
- Stefan Santi – sound engineering, guitar engineering, synthesizer sounds, editing, mixing
- Scott Stevens – additional vocal production for Ash Costello on "In the Mean Time"
- Federico Leone – editing
- Marco D'Agostino – mastering
- Roberto Toderico – artwork, layout
- Elena "Cunene" Zanotti – photos, Cristina Scabbia's outfits
- Alberto "Diavolo" Zanandrea – band outfits
- Ilaria Crucil – band outfits

== Charts ==
Chart performance for Sleepless Empire
Chart (2025)	Peak position
Austrian Albums (Ö3 Austria)	28
Belgian Albums (Ultratop Flanders)	95
Belgian Albums (Ultratop Wallonia)	54
French Albums (SNEP)	94
German Albums (Offizielle Top 100)	20
Italian Albums (FIMI)	30
Scottish Albums (OCC)	23
Swiss Albums (Schweizer Hitparade)	14
UK Albums Sales (OCC)	28
UK R&B Albums (OCC)	4
UK Rock & Metal Albums (OCC)	28
