= Halflife (EP) =

EP by Lacuna Coil
- Released: 20 March 2000
- Recorded: January 2000
- Studio: Damage Inc. Studio, Ventimiglia, Italy
- Genre: Gothic metal
- Length: 20:23
- Language: English; Italian
- Label: Century Media
- Producer: Waldemar Sorychta

Lacuna Coil chronology
In a Reverie (1999)	Halflife (2000)	Unleashed Memories (2001)

Halflife is the second EP by the Italian gothic metal band Lacuna Coil, released in 2000 by Century Media. The EP contains 5 tracks. A slightly altered version of the track Senzafine would later appear on international releases of their 2001 full-length album, Unleashed Memories, while the entire Halfife EP was appended to the American release of the album. A performance of Senzafine can also be found on the band's 2008 live album.

== Reception ==
Halflife received positive ratings, 8 out of 10, from Rock Hard and Metal.de. Likewise, Powermetal.de called it "truly remarkable", a "real pleasure" to listen to as well as a "small masterpiece". Norwegian newspaper Jærbladet gave 5 out of 6 points and recommended it to fans of Anathema, Dark Tranquility, Flowing Tears and Paradise Lost.

== Track listing ==
No.	Title	Length
1.	"Halflife"	5:01
2.	"Trance Awake"	2:00
3.	"Senzafine"	3:55
4.	"Hyperfast"	4:57
5.	"Stars" (Dubstar cover)	4:33
Total length:		20:23

== Personnel ==
=== Band members ===
Credits adapted from liner notes of the North American edition of Unleashed Memories

- Cristina Scabbia - vocals
- Andrea Ferro - vocals and grunts
- Marco Biazzi - guitar
- Cristiano Migliore - guitar
- Marco Coti Zelati - bass, keyboards, programming, design, layout design
- Cristiano Mozzati - percussion, drums, programming

=== Production ===
- Waldemar Sorychta - producer, engineer, mixing
- Dario Mollo - engineer
- Carsten Drescher - layout design
- Volker Beushausen - photography
