= Distant Sun (disambiguation) =

"Distant Sun" is a song by Crowded House from the album Together Alone. The phrase may also refer to:

- "Distant Sun", an episode from the second season of Supergirl
- "Distant Sun", a song by Lacuna Coil from the album Unleashed Memories
