= Layers of Time =

2019 single by Lacuna Coil

Single by Lacuna Coil

from the album Black Anima
- Released: July 26, 2019
- Recorded: 2019
- Studio: BRX Studio, Milan, Italy
- Genre: Gothic metalcore
- Length: 4:07
- Label: Century Media Records
- Songwriter(s): Cristina Scabbia; Andrea Ferro
- Producer(s): Marco Coti Zelati

Lacuna Coil singles chronology
"Blood, Tears, Dust" (2017)	"Layers of Time" (2019)	"Reckless" (2019)

"Layers of Time" is a song by Italian gothic metal band Lacuna Coil. It was released as the lead single from their ninth studio album Black Anima on July 26, 2019 by their record label Century Media Records and accompanied by a music video. This is the first Lacuna Coil single released since "Blood, Tears, Dust", which was released on March 22, 2017, as well as their first single without their former drummer Ryan Blake Folden, who stepped down as the band's full time drummer to "undertake new adventures in his life".

== Critical reception ==
Axl Rosenberg of Metal Sucks said that "'Layers of Time' suggests that the album won't be anticlimactic", then added, "It's every bit as catchy as anything the band has ever released, sure, but catchy is where Lacuna Coil live. What sets the track apart from other entries in the Coil catalogue is its heaviness."

== Music video ==
A music video directed by Robert "SaKu" Cinardi was released alongside the song on July 26. It was shot inside a rural palace called Villa Arconati located in Bollate, a commune in Lombardy, a region of Italy.
