= Spellbound (Lacuna Coil song) =

Single by Lacuna Coil

from the album Shallow Life
- Released: 21 February 2009
- Recorded: 2008
- Genre: Gothic metal
- Length: 3:21 (Album Version); 3:19 (Radio Edit)
- Label: Century Media, EMI
- Songwriter(s): Marco Biazzi, Marco Coti Zelati, Andrea Ferro, Don Gilmore, Cristiano Migliore, Cristiano Mozzati, Cristina Scabbia
- Producer(s): Don Gilmore

Lacuna Coil singles chronology
"Within Me" (2007)	"Spellbound" (2009)	"'I Like It'" (2009)

Music video
- "Spellbound (Performance Version)" on YouTube "Spellbound (Story Version)" on YouTube

"Spellbound" is the first single released by Lacuna Coil's fifth studio album, Shallow Life. The song is their first chart entry on the U.S. Billboard charts since "Our Truth" in 2006. It debuted at #36 on the U.S. Billboard Hot Mainstream Rock Tracks chart, and has become their first Top 30 single on that chart. The single officially debuted on 21 February 2009, when the band performed at the Soundwave Festival in Brisbane, Australia.

== Music video ==
Cristina Scabbia and Andrea Ferro in the music video for "Spellbound".

The music video for "Spellbound" was directed by Italian director Roberto Cinardi aka Saku and filmed in Milan at Dolce & Gabbana's Gold in February 2009. The clip was produced by Apnea Film and the costume was designed by Dolce & Gabbana. A 30-second teaser of the video was released on Italian MTV website on 23 March, before MTV Brand:New premiered the entire video the same day.

The music video shows the band performing the song in the fashionable Dolce & Gabbana Gold restaurant. The second version of the video alternate images of the band is performing in the middle of a golden room with images of different aspects of being under a spell of something: the girl obsessed by her weight and look, the guy who wants to be a superman, the politician, etc.

The video won an award in Italy at Premio Videoclip Italiano for "Best Editing" in 2009.

- Director: Saku
- Producer: Don Gilmore
- Director of Photography: Patrizio Saccò
- Editor: Saku
- Production Company: Apnea Film

== Track listing ==
- iTunes Digital Download Single
1. "Spellbound" - 3:21
2. "Audio Commentary Spellbound (Cristina Scabbia Talks About the Forthcoming Lacuna Coil Album Shallow Life)" - 4.31

== Release history ==
Region	Date	Label	Format
Worldwide	14 February 2009	Century Media/EMI	Radio
Europe	20 March 2009	Century Media/EMI	digital download
Australia	22 March 2009	Century Media/EMI	digital download
United Kingdom	22 March 2009	Century Media/EMI	digital download

== Chart performance ==
The single peaked at #30 on the U.S. Billboard Hot Mainstream Rock Tracks chart in July 2009. It became the band's second single to chart in the United States, as well as their second Top 40 single on the rock charts. "Our Truth" reached #36 in 2006. It also peaked at #24 on the US Active Rock chart in September 2009.

Chart (2009)	Peak position
U.S. Billboard Hot Mainstream Rock Tracks	30
US Active Rock	24
