= I Won't Tell You =

Single by Lacuna Coil

from the album Shallow Life
- Released: 6 October 2009
- Recorded: 2008
- Genre: Alternative metal, gothic metal
- Length: 3:49 (Album Version)
- Label: Century Media, EMI
- Songwriter(s): Marco Biazzi, Marco Coti Zelati, Andrea Ferro, Don Gilmore, Cristiano Migliore, Cristiano Mozzati, Cristina Scabbia
- Producer(s): Don Gilmore

Lacuna Coil singles chronology
| "I Like It" (2009) | "I Won't Tell You" (2009) | ""Wide Awake"" (2009) |

"I Won't Tell You" is the third single from Lacuna Coil's fifth album, Shallow Life. The single was released to radio on 6 October 2009 and was played on American radio station KROQ-FM and 97x. The single was digital only.

== Music video ==
The music video for "I Won't Tell You" was directed by the Italian director and producer Roberto Cinardi with the pseudonym of SaKu and premiered on the official MySpace page of the band on Tuesday 12 January 2010. The video was shot in Milan at the BaseB on 5 December 2009 and was produced by the Italian production company Red Rum.

Andrea Ferro, the vocalist of the band, revealed the concept of the video.

Energy is the keyword for our new video-clip for the song 'I Won't Tell You'. Once again we've been working with director Saku, who previously worked on 'Spellbound' (and won an award for best editing for that one). For the first time we've invited our fans to be part of the clip and be the main attraction together with the band. To be gathered and work side by side has been a really valuable and funny experience, the fans were great actors and we will never be able to thank them enough. As I say it's a really energetic video with some special FX and a great vibe.

And the director Saku explain:

We had a great time shooting the video. Despite the cold temperature there was a nice and warm human atmosphere between the band, the fans, and my crew. I'm totally satisfied with the images, Cristina and the band look so cool, and I like the way the video mixes performance, fans, and 'vampiresque' effects.

The video was shot with a reflex Canon EOS 7D.

- Director: SaKu
- Producer: SaKu, Alessia Tonellotto, Valentina Be
- Executive Producer: Melanie Schmidt
- Director of Photography: Gianluca Catania
- Editor: SaKu
- Production Company: Red Rum

== Chart positions ==
| Chart (2009) | Peak position |
|---|---|
| US Mainstream Rock Tracks (Billboard) | 35 |
