= Broken Crown Halo =

Studio album by Lacuna Coil
- Released: 31 March 2014
- Recorded: September–October 2013
- Genres: Gothic metal; alternative metal
- Length: 47:35
- Label: Century Media
- Producer: Jay Baumgardner

Lacuna Coil chronology
Dark Adrenaline (2012)	Broken Crown Halo (2014)	Delirium (2016)

Singles from Broken Crown Halo
- 1. "Nothing Stands in Our Way" Released: 7 February 2014; 2. "Die & Rise" Released: 18 February 2014; 3. "I Forgive (But I Won't Forget Your Name)" Released: 18 March 2014

Professional ratings
Review scores
Source	Rating
Loudwire	3.5/5 stars
Scream Magazine	3/6 stars
Sputnikmusic	3/5 stars
Ultimate Guitar Archive	3/5 stars

Broken Crown Halo is the seventh studio album by Italian gothic metal band Lacuna Coil. It was released through Century Media Records on 31 March 2014 in Europe, Australia and New Zealand, and on 1 April 2014 in North America. This is the last album to feature drummer Cristiano "Criz" Mozzati and guitarists Marco "Maus" Biazzi and Cristiano "Pizza" Migliore, who retired from the band in 2014, marking the end of the band's longest-standing line-up.

== Promotion ==
On 8 February 2014, a second track from the album titled "Die & Rise" was added to the Amazon store. The song was released as a digital download on Amazon.com on 18 February 2014.

=== Tour ===
On 13 January 2014, it was announced that Lacuna Coil will be doing a part of the second The Hottest Chicks in Hard Rock Tour with Sick Puppies, Eyes Set To Kill, and Cilver, making it a twenty one-date tour around the United States.

=== Singles ===
"Nothing Stands In Our Way" served as the lead single from Broken Crown Halo on 7 February 2014. The official video for the song was leaked on Vimeo on 18 August 2014.

On 10 February 2014, with the announcement that "I Forgive (But I Won’t Forget Your Name)" had been released in UK and Italian radio, it was also stated that, an official music video, was filmed the same day.

=== Commercial performance ===
In the United States, the album debuted at number 27 on the Billboard 200 with 13,000 copies sold in its first week.

== Composition ==
The Album "Broken Crown Halo" was written by Lacuna Coil, produced by Jay Baumgardner, engineered by Kyle Hoffmann and was mastered by Howie Weinberg. The album was described by the band like a cinematic album, about a dark vision of a near future.

The album was also influenced by classic Italian horror movies and bands like Goblin, the composer of Dario Argento's classics like Suspiria and Deep Red.

== Track listing ==
All tracks are written by Jay Baumgardner, Marco Biazzi, Andrea Ferro, Cristina Scabbia, and Marco Coti Zelati, except "Nothing Stands in Our Way", written by Baumgardner, Biazzi, Ferro, Cristiano Migliore, Cristiano Mozzati, Scabbia, and Zelati.

No.	Title	Length
1.	"Nothing Stands in Our Way"	4:07
2.	"Zombies"	3:47
3.	"Hostage to the Light"	3:56
4.	"Victims"	4:31
5.	"Die & Rise"	3:44
6.	"I Forgive (But I Won't Forget Your Name)"	3:56
7.	"Cybersleep"	4:26
8.	"Infection"	4:23
9.	"I Burn in You"	4:15
10.	"In the End I Feel Alive"	4:21
11.	"One Cold Day" (Dedicated to deceased ex-band member Claudio Leo)	6:09
Total length:		47:35

Broken Crown Halo — Deluxe Edition Bonus DVD
No.	Title	Length
1.	"Chapter 1: Pawn Takes Rook"
2.	"Chapter 2: Beyond the Queen"
3.	"Chapter 3: Introducing the Bishop"
4.	"Chapter 4: Knights at the Ready"
5.	"Chapter 5: Sicilian Defense"
6.	"Chapter 6: The Queen's Gambit"
7.	"Chapter 7: The Castled King"
8.	"Chapter 8: The Stonewall"
9.	"Chapter 9: Endgame"

Broken Crown Halo — Ltd. Deluxe Artbook (includes extended art booklet, bonus DVD, and selected "best of" tracks)
No.	Title	Length
1.	"Trip the Darkness"	3:12
2.	"Kill the Light"	3:35
3.	"End of Time"	3:53
4.	"I Won't Tell You"	3:49
5.	"Spellbound"	3:21
6.	"Wide Awake"	3:51
7.	"Our Truth"	4:03
8.	"Closer"	3:02
9.	"Swamped"	4:00
10.	"Heaven's a Lie"	4:46
11.	"To Live Is to Hide"	4:34
12.	"1.19"	4:58
13.	"Halflife"	5:00
14.	"Senzafine"	3:53
15.	"My Wings"	3:45
16.	"Falling Again"	5:07
17.	"No Need to Explain"	3:37
18.	"The Secret..."	4:16
Total length:		72:42

== Personnel ==
Lacuna Coil

- Andrea Ferro – male vocals
- Cristina Scabbia – female vocals
- Marco "Maus" Biazzi – lead guitar
- Cristiano "Pizza" Migliore – rhythm guitar
- Marco Coti Zelati – bass, keyboards
- Cristiano "CriZ" Mozzati: drums, percussion

Additional personnel

- Jay Baumgardner – production

== Charts ==
Chart	Peak position
Austrian Albums (Ö3 Austria)	55
Belgian Albums (Ultratop Flanders)	66
Belgian Albums (Ultratop Wallonia)	60
Canadian Albums (Billboard)	65
Dutch Albums (Album Top 100)	75
French Albums (SNEP)	66
German Albums (Offizielle Top 100)	40
Greek Albums	63
Italian Albums (FIMI)	13
Japanese Albums	201
Swiss Albums (Schweizer Hitparade)	37
UK Albums (Official Charts)	45
UK Rock & Metal Albums (Official Charts)	3
US Billboard 200	27
US Top Hard Rock Albums (Billboard)	5
US Independent Albums (Billboard)	4
US Top Rock Albums (Billboard)	9
US Indie Store Album Sales (Billboard)	16

Single	Chart (2014)	Peak position
"Die & Rise"	Mainstream Rock	35

== Release history ==
Country	Date	Edition	Format	Label
Europe	March 31, 2014	Standard	CD, Digital download	Century Media
Australia	March 31, 2014	Standard	CD, Digital download	Century Media
New Zealand	March 31, 2014	Standard	CD, Digital download	Century Media
Canada	April 1, 2014	Standard	CD, Digital download	Century Media
United States	April 1, 2014	Standard	CD, Digital download	Century Media
