= Delirium (Lacuna Coil album) =

Studio album by Lacuna Coil
- Released: 27 May 2016
- Recorded: December 2015 – February 2016
- Studios: BRX Studio, Milano, Italy
- Genres: Gothic metal, metalcore
- Length: 44:38
- Labels: Century Media; Sony Music Entertainment
- Producer: Marco Coti Zelati

Lacuna Coil chronology
Broken Crown Halo (2014)	Delirium (2016)	Black Anima (2019)

Singles from Delirium
- 1. "The House of Shame" Released: 8 April 2016; 2. "Delirium" Released: 22 April 2016; 3. "Ghost in the Mist" Released: 6 May 2016; 4. "Blood, Tears, Dust" Released: 22 March 2017

Professional ratings
Review scores
Source	Rating
AllMusic	4.5/5 stars
Burrn!	92/100
Kerrang!	4/5 stars
Loudwire	Favorable
MetalSucks	4.5/5 stars
Metal Hammer	5/7 stars
Outburn	10/10 stars
Revolver	4/5 stars

Delirium is the eighth studio album by Italian gothic metal band Lacuna Coil. It was released by Century Media Records on 27 May 2016. This is the first album to not feature long time drummer Cristiano "Criz" Mozzati, rhythm guitarist Cristiano "Pizza" Migliore, who retired from the band on Valentine's Day, 14 February 2014, and lead guitarist Marco "Maus" Biazzi, who left the band just before recording sessions, making it the first album since their debut to feature other band members, and the first one completely recorded and mixed in Italy.

== Background and recording ==
Lacuna Coil began shaping their eighth studio album, the follow-up to 2014's Broken Crown Halo, during the final shows of their "Broken Crown Halo Tour". Bassist Marco Coti Zelati was absent for a small portion of the tour due to illness but collected ideas while at home recovering. The band took short break after the tour ended and visited Coti Zelati's home studio to look over what he'd come up with. During an interview on 6 April 2016, male vocalist Andrea Ferro said, "all the material that was coming from him was ultimately pretty intense, a little heavier and a little darker than usual and we really liked this new direction he was taking."

When asked to explain the recording process during an interview, female vocalist Cristina Scabbia responded, "The process was pretty much the same; we always write in the same place – Marco's (Coti-Zelati) basement. He has a studio in the south so nothing really changed in the song-writing process but obviously the ideas were different and the inspiration was different, and there was a bit of time between Delirium and Broken Crown Halo (2014) so the life experiences were different. But the song-writing was done in the same way starting from the music and then contributing the vocal lines and lyrics."

The band ended up appointing Coti Zelati as their producer. Scabbia said, "I'm really proud of Marco because it was the first time that we self-produced the record. We did it in Milano with people that we knew and I think that Marco did a great job. We chose all the sounds and the parts to keep and I think that he conveyed perfectly the spirit of Delirium. It's our heaviest record and it's our most intense record – even in terms of the visual side of the record; the photo-shoot and the booklet – it may be the first concept album that we've ever done because everything is there and we know perfectly what we want".

The official recording process began in December 2015 and finished in February 2016 at BRX Studio in Milano, Italy, by Marco Barusso who also mixed the album.

Due to the sudden resignation of the band's previous guitarist Marco "Maus" Biazzi, Coti Zelati recorded the majority of guitar work for the tracks. Myles Kennedy of Alter Bridge, Mark Vollelunga of Nothing More, Diego Cavallotti and Marco Barusso played the guitar solos on various tracks.

== Themes ==
Following their 2014 release, Broken Crown Halo, which was described by the band as "a cinematic album, about a dark vision of a near future", Delirium takes on a conceptual theme of insanity occurring inside an asylum. The band have described the album as "horrors that we must face in everyday life by exploring the unknown, and to one day, hopefully find the cure."

Vocalist Andrea Ferro said, "Basically, once we found the word, we thought about connecting the concept of the record, the concept of the mental illness with the smaller topic of everyday craziness – the craziness you experience personally every day in real life. Some of us went through some depression, some other people had some family problem that forced them to experience a different moment in their life. And so we played with the symptoms and we did a bit of research about the characteristics of each mental illness and then drag it into this concept, which is we imagined a sanitorium, a Lacuna Coil sanitorium, like the record, basically, and every song is like a room of the sanitorium where a patient is facing a different kind of illness."

During a podcast featuring vocalist Cristina Scabbia, she was questioned about the concept of the album and responded with; "We just realized it was a concept we were basically living in." She also elusively detailed a personal incident involving mental illness that happened within her family which thereby initiated visits to modern day mental health facilities and stated she was "really, really close to this matter".

Discussing the opening track "The House of Shame" during an interview with Metal Hammer, Scabbia described it as a "story of a real sanatorium in the States. It was said to be haunted." Ferro added; "It was a way to welcome people musically. It describes this situation where you are locked in your bed and don't quite know what is going on; so it was the perfect song to introduce the place, which is the album."

The song "You Love Me 'Cause I Hate You", was inspired by symptoms of stockholm syndrome.

== Promotion ==
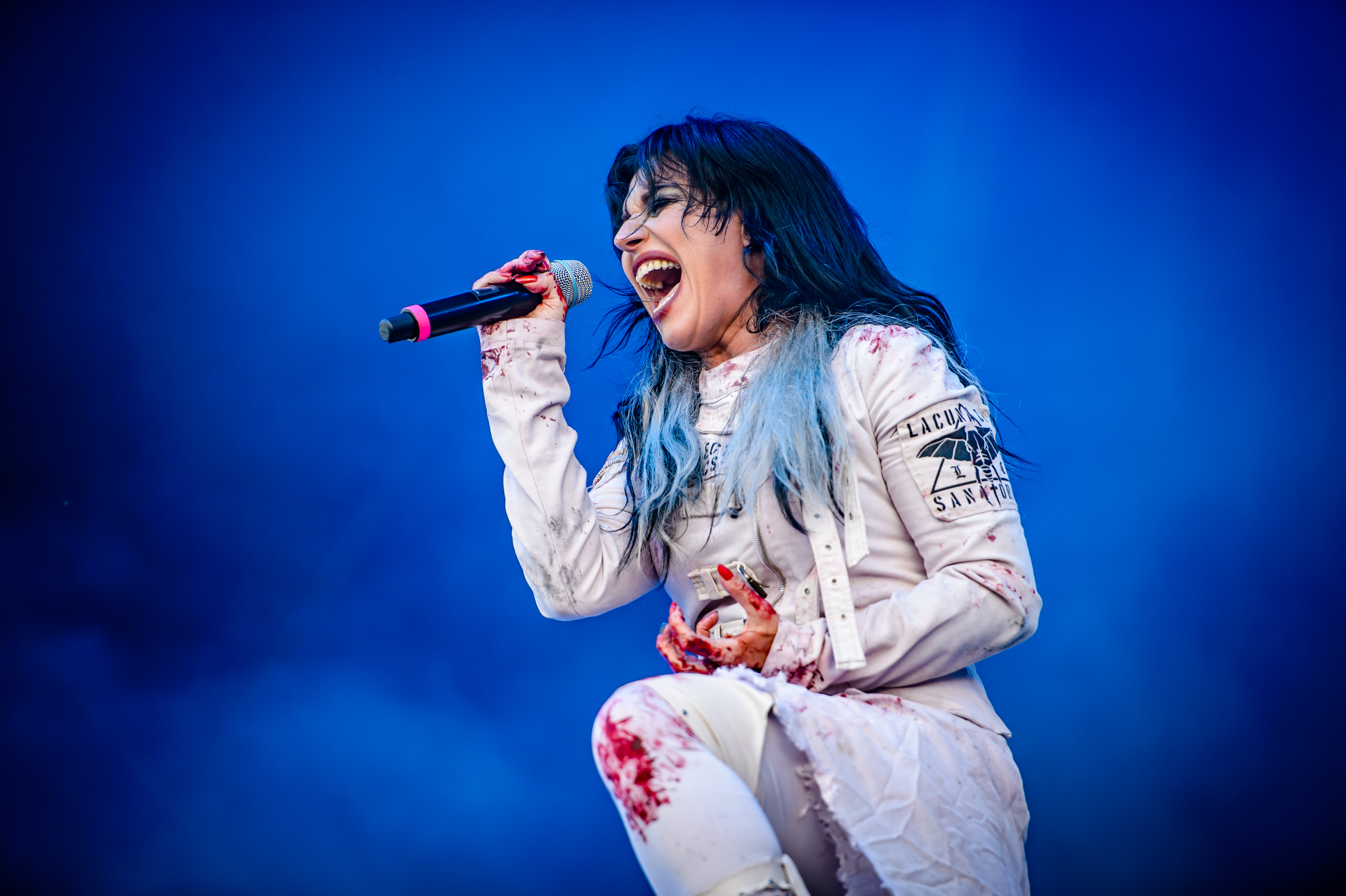
Lacuna Coil promoting the album at the Rock Harz festival in 2017.

On 8 December 2015, the band announced recording sessions had taken place, and the new album would be titled Delirium. Then, on 10 March 2016, the album cover and track listing were revealed.

On 8 April 2016, the band officially announced that they would return to North America for the "Delirium Worldwide" tour to promote the album. The first leg of the tour would have support from Butcher Babies as direct support. 9Electric, and Painted Wives would support as well. The very same day, the lead single "The House of Shame" was released through Revolver Magazine. The second leg of the "Delirium Worldwide" tour details were announced on 20 April 2016. Three dates were added where Lacuna Coil would directly support Halestorm. Beginning 31 May 2016, the California-based metal band Stitched Up Heart would replace Butcher Babies as main support.

The title track and second single, "Delirium" was offered for free streaming via Loudwire on 22 April 2016. On 6 May 2016 Lacuna Coil officially premiered a third single entitled "Ghost in the Mist". Anyone who pre-ordered a digital copy from iTunes Store or Amazon Music was immediately able to download "Ghost in the Mist", "Delirium" and "The House of Shame".

On 30 May 2016, the band began a small viral marketing based "treasure hunt" via Facebook. Members of the band, including Scabbia and Coti-Zelati have visited various Best Buy locations in the United States to hide autographed guitar picks inside the stores. Coti-Zelati punctured the outer packaging of at least one copy of the album so that the pick was inside. Scabbia has posted a number of videos on her personal Facebook page to give fans clues as to what stores the picks are located at as well as where they are hidden. She stated in one of her videos, "We're not supposed to do that but please love us, Best Buy. We love our fans."

On 1 June 2016, Lacuna Coil officially announced a European headlining tour beginning in October 2016. On 21 July, a music video for the track, "Delirium" was released on Vevo. On 22 March 2017, a music video for the track, "Blood Tears Dust" was also released on Vevo. It was one of two Lacuna Coil videos directed by Cosimo Alemà with the production company, Borotalco.tv. It is the first Lacuna Coil video to debut their new guitarist, Diego Cavallotti. Both videos also star actor, Andrew Harwood Mills. The second video clip will be for the track, "You Love Me 'Cause I Hate You" was released 15 May.

== Reception ==
Delirium received critical acclaim. Axl Rosenberg, one of the founders of MetalSucks said "If fans bristle at any aspect of Delirium, it will be the album's relative paucity of more upbeat, Karmacode-esque material. But most should find it hard to complain about almost wall-to-wall "Heaven's a Lie's. And it's not like the album is wanting for energetic anger: I can’t remember Ferro ever having done this much screaming in the past." He also added that the album "is addictive and will temporarily consume your listening schedule. Maybe Lacuna Coil should go through massive line-up changes more often?"

After Delirium was officially released on 27 May 2016, the album almost immediately peaked on US iTunes charts as No. 1 under their Metal category, No. 2 under their Rock category and No. 10 overall.

== Track listing ==
All tracks are written by Lacuna Coil, except "Live to Tell", written by Madonna and Patrick Leonard.

No.	Title	Length
1.	"The House of Shame"	5:17
2.	"Broken Things"	3:59
3.	"Delirium"	3:16
4.	"Blood, Tears, Dust"	3:55
5.	"Downfall"	4:21
6.	"Take Me Home"	3:45
7.	"You Love Me 'Cause I Hate You"	3:49
8.	"Ghost in the Mist"	4:14
9.	"My Demons"	3:56
10.	"Claustrophobia"	4:08
11.	"Ultima Ratio"	4:08
Total length:		44:38

Deluxe Digipack edition bonus tracks
No.	Title	Length
12.	"Live to Tell" (Madonna cover)	5:29
13.	"Breakdown"	3:17
14.	"Bleed the Pain"	3:47
Total length:		57:11

== Personnel ==
- Andrea Ferro – male vocals
- Cristina Scabbia – female vocals
- Marco Coti Zelati – bass, guitars, keyboards, synth
- Ryan Blake Folden – drums

Guest musicians

- Diego Cavallotti – guitar solos on "My Demons" and "Ultima Ratio", additional guitars
- Marco Barusso – guitar solo on "The House of Shame", additional guitars
- Myles Kennedy – guitar solo on "Downfall"
- Alessandro La Porta – guitar solo on "Claustrophobia"
- Mark Vollelunga – guitar solo and additional guitars on "Blood, Tears, Dust"

Technical personnel

- Marco Coti Zelati – production, artwork
- Marco Barusso – engineering, mixing
- Dario Valentini – engineering
- Marco D'Agostino – mastering
- Alessandro 'T1' Olgiati – photography

== Charts ==
Chart performance for Delirium
Chart (2016)	Peak position
Australian Albums (ARIA)	19
Austrian Albums (Ö3 Austria)	40
Belgian Albums (Ultratop Flanders)	29
Belgian Albums (Ultratop Wallonia)	49
Dutch Albums (Album Top 100)	94
French Albums (SNEP)	85
German Albums (Offizielle Top 100)	33
Italian Albums (FIMI)	11
Japanese Albums (Oricon)	143
Swiss Albums (Schweizer Hitparade)	30
UK Albums (Official Charts)	42
US Billboard 200	33
US Top Hard Rock Albums (Billboard)	2
US Top Rock Albums (Billboard)	4
