= Lacuna Coil (EP) =

EP by Lacuna Coil
- Released: April 7, 1998
- Recorded: October - November 1997
- Studios: Woodhouse Studios, Hagen, Germany
- Genre: Gothic metal
- Length: 27:52
- Label: Century Media
- Producer: Waldemar Sorychta

Lacuna Coil chronology
Ethereal (1996)	Lacuna Coil (1998)	In a Reverie (1999)

Professional ratings
Review scores
Source	Rating
AllMusic	3/5 stars
Chronicles of Chaos	8/10
Collector's Guide to Heavy Metal	6/10
Rock Hard	9.0/10
Scream Magazine	4/6

Lacuna Coil is the first EP by Italian gothic metal band Lacuna Coil, released on April 7, 1998, by Century Media.

== Track listing ==
All lyrics are written by Andrea Ferro and Cristina Scabbia; all music is composed by Lacuna Coil.

No.	Title	Length
1.	"No Need to Explain"	3:37
2.	"The Secret..."	4:16
3.	"This Is My Dream"	4:06
4.	"Soul into Hades"	4:52
5.	"Falling"	5:39
6.	"Un Fantasma Tra Noi"	5:22
Total length:		27:52

== Credits ==
Lacuna Coil

- Andrea Ferro - male vocals
- Cristina Scabbia - female vocals
- Raffaele Zagaria - guitars
- Claudio Leo - guitars
- Marco Coti Zelati - bass
- Leonardo Forti - drums

Production

- Waldemar Sorychta - keyboards, producer, engineer
- Media Logistics (Carsten Drescher) - design and layout
