= In a Reverie =

Studio album by Lacuna Coil
- Released: 8 June 1999
- Recorded: October–November 1998
- Studio: Woodhouse Studios, Hagen, Germany
- Genre: Gothic metal
- Length: 42:27
- Label: Century Media
- Producer: Waldemar Sorychta

Lacuna Coil chronology
Lacuna Coil (EP) (1998)	In a Reverie (1999)	Halflife (EP) (2000)

Alternative cover
- 2005 re-release cover

Professional ratings
Review scores
Source	Rating
AllMusic	4/5 stars
Chronicles of Chaos	7.5/10
Collector's Guide to Heavy Metal	7/10
Rock Hard	8.5/10

In a Reverie is the debut studio album by Italian gothic metal band Lacuna Coil. It was released on 8 June 1999 through Century Media Records. In 2005, the album was re-released with new artwork and a new cover.

The song "Falling Again" is a sequel to the track "Falling" from the debut 1997 EP.

== Track listing ==
All credits adapted from the original releases. All arrangements by Lacuna Coil.

All lyrics are written by Andrea Ferro and Cristina Scabbia; all music is composed by Cristiano Migliore and Marco Coti Zelati, except where indicated.

No.	Title	Lyrics	Music	Length
1.	"Circle"			3:55
2.	"Stately Lover"			4:51
3.	"Honeymoon Suite"			4:30
4.	"My Wings"			3:45
5.	"To Myself I Turned"	Scabbia	Waldemar Sorychta	4:24
6.	"Cold"			4:18
7.	"Reverie"			6:20
8.	"Veins of Glass"			5:13
9.	"Falling Again"	Scabbia	Coti Zelati	5:07
Total length:				42:27

Japanese edition bonus tracks
No.	Title	Music	Length
14.	"No Need to Explain"	Lacuna Coil	3:38
15.	"Falling"	Lacuna Coil	5:39
Total length:			51:44

== Personnel ==
Lacuna Coil

- Andrea Ferro – male vocals
- Cristina Scabbia – female vocals
- Cristiano "Pizza" Migliore – guitars
- Marco Coti Zelati – bass
- Cristiano "CriZ" Mozzati – drums

Additional musicians

- Waldemar Sorychta – keyboards
- Valerie Lynch – lyrics adaptation

Production

- Waldemar Sorychta – production, engineering
- Siggi Bemm – engineering
- Wolfgang Bartsch – photography
- Carsten Drescher – layout & design
