= Visual Karma (Body, Mind and Soul) =

Live album by Lacuna Coil
- Released: 31 October 2008 (Europe); November 25, 2008 (US)
- Recorded: 2006–2008
- Genres: Alternative metal Gothic metal
- Length: (Two disc)
- Labels: Century Media, EMI
- Producer: Lacuna Coil

Lacuna Coil chronology
| Karmacode (2006) | Visual Karma (Body, Mind and Soul) (2008) | Shallow Life (2009) |

Professional ratings
Review scores
| Source | Rating |
|---|---|
| About.com | 4/5 stars |
| Kerrang! | 5/5 stars |
| Lords of Metal | (69/100) |

Visual Karma (Body, Mind and Soul) is the first live album by Italian gothic metal band Lacuna Coil, that was released in November 2008. The DVD is retrospective of all things from the band's "Karmacode" album cycle, the set features concerts filmed at Germany's Wacken Festival and at the Japanese Loudpark Festival in 2007. It includes a lot of extras like promo videos and Behind-the-scenes.

The DVD was released in 2 disc Standard Edition and 4 Disc Limited Edition (Europe only) that includes a 5.1 mix of the "Karmacode" album on DVD Audio and a bonus CD with the Wacken Open Air audio live material.

== Promotion ==
In November and December 2008, Lacuna Coil toured in Europe as the main support for act Bullet for my Valentine, with Bleeding Through and Black Tide also supporting. After the cancellation of their first headline tour in Australia, the band announced their participation at the Soundwave festival 2009 in February.

== Track listing ==
=== Standard edition ===
Disc One:
Karmalive

Wacken 2007:

1. "Intro / To the Edge" - 3:22
2. "Fragments of Faith" - 4:00
3. "Swamped" - 4:10
4. "In Visible Light" - 3:59
5. "Fragile" - 4:26
6. "Closer" - 3:01
7. "Senzafine" - 3:45
8. "What I See" - 3:41
9. "Enjoy the Silence" - 4:05
10. "Heaven's a Lie" - 4:45
11. "Our Truth" - 4:03

Loudpark 2007:

1. "Intro / To the Edge" - 3:22
2. "Swamped" - 4:00
3. "Closer" - 3:01
4. "Within Me" - 3:39
5. "Daylight Dancer" - 3:50
6. "Our Truth" - 4:03

Karma Clips (Promotional Videos)

1. "Our Truth"
2. "Enjoy the Silence"
3. "Closer"
4. "Within Me"

Disc Two:
Karma Chronicles

The Band:

1. "Cristina Scabbia – Simple as Water"
2. "Andrea Ferro – Inside Milan"
3. "Cristiano 'Pizza' Migliore – The Learning Journey of Pizza"
4. "Marco 'Maus' Biazzi – 7-Seven… Strings Life"
5. "Marco Coti Zelati – The Real Thing"
6. "CriZ – Enter the Drummer"

Behind the Scenes:

1. "Australian Tour 2007"
2. "First Time in Japan"
3. "Making of the Our Truth Video"
4. "Making of the Closer Video"

Breaking the Code: The Fans

The Fans:

- "Fan Submissions"
1. "Lacuna Coil's introductory clip
2. "Aaron Tiberio, USA
3. "Jessica Hecht, USA
4. "Robert Marsh, UK
5. "Enrico Murgia, Italy
6. "Giorgio Ghirardo, Japan
7. "Ira Yurkovsckaya, Ukraine
8. "Kim Allcroft, UK
9. "Luis Flores, USA
10. "Silvana Rosa, Italy
11. "Carolyn Riondet, France
- "Empty Spiral Interview
- "To The Edge Remix Contest / Photogallery"
1. "Marek 'Marcoos' Kruszynski, Poland"
2. "Stefan Machwirth / Complex Range, Germany"
3. "Interface, USA"
- "Inside the Spiral (Link)"
- "Links"

=== Limited Edition ===
DVD Audio:

1. "Fragile"
2. "To the Edge"
3. "Our Truth"
4. "Within Me"
5. "Devoted"
6. "You Create"
7. "What I See"
8. "Fragments of Faith"
9. "Closer"
10. "In Visible Light"
11. "The Game"
12. "Without Fear"
13. "Enjoy the Silence"
14. "Without a Reason (bonus song from the Our Truth single)"
15. "Virtual Environment (bonus song from the Enjoy the Silence single)"

CD:

1. "Intro / To the Edge"
2. "Fragments of Faith"
3. "Swamped"
4. "In Visible Light"
5. "Fragile"
6. "Closer"
7. "Senzafine"
8. "What I See"
9. "Enjoy the Silence"
10. "Heaven's a Lie"
11. "Our Truth"

=== iTunes Digital Download/Amazon MP3 ===
1. "Intro / To the Edge"
2. "Fragments of Faith"
3. "Swamped"
4. "In Visible Light"
5. "Fragile"
6. "Closer"
7. "Senzafine"
8. "What I See"
9. "Enjoy the Silence"
10. "Heaven's a Lie"
11. "Our Truth"

== Release history ==
| Country | Date |
|---|---|
| Europe | 31 October 2008 |
| Australia | 1 November 2008 |
| Sweden | 1 November 2008 |
| United Kingdom | 3 November 2008 |
| Italy | 7 November 2008 |
| Russia | 19 November 2008 |
| Japan | 19 November 2008 |
| Canada | November 25, 2008 |
| United States | November 25, 2008 |
