= Within Me =

Single by Lacuna Coil

from the album Karmacode
- Released: 3 April 2007
- Recorded: 2006
- Genre: Gothic metal
- Length: 3:38 (album version); 4:00 (radio & video version)
- Label: Century Media
- Songwriters: Lacuna Coil (Marco Biazzi, Marco Coti Zelati, Andrea Ferro, Cristiano Migliore, Cristiano Mozzati, Cristina Scabbia)
- Producers: Lacuna Coil and Waldemar Sorychta

Lacuna Coil singles chronology
"Closer" (2006)	"Within Me" (2007)	"Spellbound" (2009)

Music video
- "Within Me" on YouTube

"Within Me" is a song by Italian gothic metal band Lacuna Coil. It was released as the fourth and final single from their fourth studio album, Karmacode.

The song is a power ballad and the first released as a single by the band.

The release of the single coincided with the start of the Jägermeister Music Tour where the band supported Stone Sour. The song was also performed on MTV2's Headbangers Ball.

== Meaning of the song ==
'Within Me' was a song that we wrote for a friend that basically, it was not suicide, but basically he let himself go by using drugs a lot. He passed away 3 or 4 years ago now. The fact that we couldn’t do anything. It was not suicide but it was just abusing so he let himself go in a way that we couldn't do anything to help him out. He was in New York and we in Italy so it was tough to stay with him. We were on tour, we had other things to do. So, the idea was that sometimes you want to be there for your friends but you can’t be there. That time we were not there we lost him. It was the first time that happened to us as a band, that you know somebody and work with him and he died like that, in a stupid way. So we learned to be stronger people with that. We learned to deal with situation that you can’t always have control of.

— Andrea Ferro, Anarchy Music

Within Me
21-second audio sample of "Within Me".

== Release ==
The music video was released on 10 April 2007. The single was scheduled to be released on 4 May 2007, but it was delayed a week, eventually being released on 11 May 2007, exclusively in the bands native country of Italy.

A different version of the single was released in America on 24 September 2007 and in Japan on 2007 September 25.

== Critical reception ==
The song was generally well received by critics. PopMatters said of the song, "It’s formulaic, but at least this band knows how to work the formula well.". Metal.it described the song as, "è un colpo a sorpresa, un brano che potrebbe essere il prologo dei futuri Lacuna Coil" (It's a surprise, a track that could be a prologue of future Lacuna Coil).

== Music video ==
The video was filmed from 2 to 3 March 2007 in Turin at Borgo Medievale's park and castle and in the Sardinian desert. Band members appear in old style costumes. The video makes use of certain special effects, including artificial rain. Cristina Scabbia, after having filmed her part, went to the US to film the video for "À Tout le Monde (Set Me Free)" with Megadeth. The music video was released on 10 April 2007.

- Producer: Melanie Schmidt
- Cinematography: Matteo De Martini
- Production Company: MO Vi DA Entertainment

== Formats and track listings ==
These are the formats and track listings of major single releases of "Within Me".

- Radio promo CD
1. "Within Me"
2. "Within Me (Instrumental)"
- Italian CD single
1. "Within Me"
2. "Enjoy the Silence (Live)"
3. "When a Dead Man Walks (Live)"
- Japanese CD single
1. "Within Me"
2. "Virtual Environment"
3. "Closer (Acoustic Version)"
4. "Tightrope (Live)"
5. "Fragile (Live)"
6. "To the Edge (Live)"
7. "Our Truth (Live)"
8. "Heaven's a Lie (Live)"

== Release history ==
Country	Date
Italy	11 May 2007
United States	24 September 2007
Japan	2007 September 25

== Chart ==
Chart	Peak position
Italian Singles Chart	44
