= Karmacode =

Studio album by Lacuna Coil
- Released: 31 March 2006
- Recorded: 2005
- Genre: Gothic metal; alternative metal; nu metal
- Length: 47:19
- Language: English, Italian
- Label: Century Media
- Producer: Waldemar Sorychta

Lacuna Coil chronology
The EPs (2005)	Karmacode (2006)	Visual Karma (Body, Mind and Soul) (2008)

Singles from Karmacode
- 1. "Our Truth" Released: 21 February 2006; 2. "Enjoy the Silence" Released: 11 July 2006; 3. "Closer" Released: 24 October 2006; 4. "Within Me" Released: 3 April 2007

Professional ratings
Aggregate scores
Source	Rating
Metacritic	62/100
Review scores
Source	Rating
Allmusic	4.5/5 stars
About.com	4.5/5 stars
Answers	4/5 stars
Musical Discoveries	5/5 stars
Popmatters	7/10 stars
Stylus Magazine	C−

Karmacode is the fourth studio album by Italian gothic metal band Lacuna Coil, released on 31 March 2006 in several countries in Europe, 3 April in the UK and other European countries, 4 April in North America, and 5 April in several other European countries through Century Media Records. 500,000 copies of Karmacode have officially been sold worldwide. In Italy the album sold over 20,000 copies, earning the album a Silver record. In the United States, the album sold around 200,000 copies.

The album's four singles released include "Our Truth", the cover of "Enjoy the Silence", "Closer", and "Within Me". Vocalist Cristina Scabbia confirmed that the song "Without Fear" is an Italian song. Music videos for all singles have been released.

Lacuna Coil's version of "Enjoy The Silence" caught the attention and admiration of Dave Gahan, the lead vocalist of Depeche Mode. Gahan, known for his discerning taste and appreciation for covers of his band's songs, expressed a particular fondness for Lacuna Coil's rendition. Among various popular covers of "Enjoy The Silence," including those by Tori Amos, Entwine, and Mike Koglin, Gahan was drawn to Lacuna Coil's interpretation for its unique and distinct sound.

In an interview discussing cover versions of Depeche Mode's songs, Dave Gahan praised Lacuna Coil's take on "Enjoy the Silence," stating, "Their interpretation left me genuinely impressed; it encapsulated the distinctive vibe I always hoped someone would bring to it."

Karmacode has a more prominent Middle-Eastern sound compared with Lacuna Coil's previous releases. The album is considered a blend of classical and modern rock, which is notably heavier and more metallic than previous releases. Popmatters comments that the album "doesn’t take any bold steps forward, but it still shows just how good Lacuna Coil are at what they do, presented in a high-gloss, primed-for-stardom package that is bound to go over huge".

Two songs from the album have been featured in music video games: "Closer" in Guitar Hero III: Legends of Rock and as downloadable content in Rock Band, also on-disc featured in Rock Band Metal Track Pack, and "Our Truth" in Rock Band 2, Rock Band Unplugged and Guitar Hero World Tour.

In September 2007, Lacuna Coil and website digitalmusician.net launched a competition titled To the Edge remix, accepting remixes of song "To the Edge", with the possibility of a release.

== Track list ==
All songs written by Lacuna Coil, except "Enjoy the Silence" written by Martin Gore

No.	Title	Length
1.	"Fragile"	4:26
2.	"To the Edge"	3:21
3.	"Our Truth"	4:03
4.	"Within Me"	3:38
5.	"Devoted"	3:52
6.	"You Create"	1:32
7.	"What I See"	3:41
8.	"Fragments of Faith"	4:10
9.	"Closer"	3:01
10.	"In Visible Light"	3:59
11.	"The Game"	3:32
12.	"Without Fear"	3:59
13.	"Enjoy the Silence" (Depeche Mode cover)	4:05
Total length:		47:19

Japanese Edition Bonus Tracks
No.	Title	Length
14.	"Without a Reason"	4:51
15.	"Swamped (Acoustic)"	3:39
Total length:		55:49

== Enhanced CD content ==
1. On the Road Movie -9:58
2. Our Truth (Video)

== Release history ==
Country	Date
Italy	31 March 2006
United Kingdom	3 April 2006
United States	4 April 2006

== Charts ==
Album

Chart (2006)	Peak position
Austrian Albums Chart	52
Canadian Albums Chart	72
Dutch Albums Chart	86
European Albums Chart	38
Finnish Albums Chart	40
French Albums Chart	54
German Albums Chart	43
Greek Albums Chart	21
Irish Albums Chart	98
Italian Albums Chart	17
Japanese Albums Chart	139
UK Albums Chart	47
US Billboard 200	28

Singles - Billboard (North America)

Year	Single	Chart	Peak position
2006	"Our Truth"	Mainstream Rock	36
