= Our Truth =

Single by Lacuna Coil

from the album Karmacode
- A-side: "Our Truth"
- B-side: "Without a Reason"
- Released: 21 February 2006
- Recorded: 2005
- Genre: Nu metal; alternative metal
- Label: Century Media
- Songwriters: Marco Biazzi, Marco Coti Zelati, Andrea Ferro, Cristiano Migliore, Cristiano Mozzati, Cristina Scabbia
- Producer: Waldemar Sorychta

Lacuna Coil singles chronology
"Swamped" (2004)	"Our Truth" (2006)	"Enjoy the Silence" (2006)

Music video
- "Our Truth" on YouTube

"Our Truth" is the first single by Italian gothic metal band Lacuna Coil from the album Karmacode. The song was also featured on the soundtrack to Underworld: Evolution. It was a Top 30 Active Rock single on the Billboard Charts. The video was on "hot rotation" on MTV Italy and received significant airplay on American music channels such as MTV on T-Minus Rock and MTV2 on Headbangers Ball.

Lyrically, the song delves into denying and forgetting one's past by creating a new truth as time goes by.

The song is somewhat different in sound compared to the band's typical work as it features a more profound Asian influence. The song is based heavily on the Phrygian and Phrygian dominant modes, which are characteristic of Egyptian music and Arabic music. A shamisen, a Japanese string instrument, is featured in the opening and ending of the song and a faint sitar can be heard during the verses.

The song is featured as an on-disc track in Rock Band Unplugged, Rock Band 2, Guitar Hero World Tour and Rock Revolution. In all but the latter, it is a master recording (a cover version was provided for its inclusion in Rock Revolution).

== Track listing ==
1. Our Truth (Radio Edit) - 3:26
2. Without a Reason - 4:50
3. Swamped (Radio Mix) - 3:46
4. Our Truth (Jack Dangers Mix) - 3:23
5. Enhanced Part:
  - Photo Gallery
  - Wallpapers

== Music video ==
The video for the song was shot on 3 December 2005 in Los Angeles by Fort Awesome. It was produced by Rocket Entertainment and featured Cynthia Freund as costume designer. The video came out in February 2006 and was made available on the U.S. iTunes Store in October 2008. It features the band playing in what appears to be a snowglobe.

In 2006 it was nominated for the "Best Group Video" category at the Italian Premio Videoclip Italiano, losing against Subsonica's "Incantevole".

- Director: Fort Awesome (Nathan Cox & Zach Merck)
- Director of Photography: Dave Kalvert
- Editor: Fort Awesome
- Production Company: Rocket Entertainment

== Charts ==
Chart (2006)	Peak position
Italian Singles Chart	23
Spanish Singles Chart	16
UK Singles Chart	40
U.S. Billboard Hot Mainstream Rock Tracks	36

== Sample ==
Our Truth
"Our Truth" from Karmacode
