= Unleashed Memories =

Studio album by Lacuna Coil
- Released: 20 March 2001
- Recorded: October–November 2000
- Studio: Woodhouse Studios, Hagen, Germany
- Genre: Gothic metal
- Length: 49:46
- Language: English, Italian
- Label: Century Media
- Producer: Waldemar Sorychta

Lacuna Coil chronology
Halflife (EP) (2000)	Unleashed Memories (2001)	Comalies (2002)

Alternative cover
- Re-release cover

Professional ratings
Review scores
Source	Rating
AllMusic	3/5 stars
Kerrang!	3/5 stars
Metal Hammer	8/10
Metal Storm	9/10
Chronicles of Chaos	8.5/10

Unleashed Memories is the second studio album by Italian gothic metal band Lacuna Coil. The album was released 20 March 2001 through Century Media Records and is the first release to feature the classic lineup as Marco Biazzi joined the band. American releases append the Halflife EP to this album.

== Track listing ==
No.	Title	Lyrics	Music	Length
1.	"Heir of a Dying Day"	Cristina Scabbia	Marco Coti Zelati	4:59
2.	"To Live Is to Hide"	Andrea Ferro, Scabbia	Coti Zelati	4:34
3.	"Purify"	Scabbia	Marco Biazzi, Cristiano Migliore, Coti Zelati	4:36
4.	"Senzafine"	Ferro, Scabbia	Coti Zelati	3:53
5.	"When a Dead Man Walks"	Scabbia	Coti Zelati	5:54
6.	"1.19"	Scabbia	Coti Zelati	4:58
7.	"Cold Heritage"	Scabbia	Coti Zelati	5:23
8.	"Distant Sun"	Scabbia	Coti Zelati	5:29
9.	"A Current Obsession"	Scabbia	Coti Zelati	5:20
10.	"Wave of Anguish"	Ferro	Migliore, Coti Zelati	4:40
Total length:				49:46

2005 re-issue bonus track
No.	Title	Lyrics	Music	Length
11.	"Lost Lullaby"	Scabbia	Migliore, Coti Zelati	5:03
Total length:				54:49

North American bonus tracks (Halflife EP)
No.	Title	Lyrics	Music	Length
11.	"Halflife"	Ferro, Scabbia	Coti Zelati	5:01
12.	"Trance Awake"		Cristiano Mozzati, Coti Zelati	2:00
13.	"Senzafine" (Original Version)	Ferro, Scabbia	Coti Zelati	3:55
14.	"Hyperfast"	Ferro, Scabbia	Biazzi, Coti Zelati	4:57
15.	"Stars" (Dubstar cover)	Steve Hillier	Hillier	4:33
Total length:				70:09

=== Reissue enhanced CD content ===
1. Photo gallery and Wallpapers

== Personnel ==
As adopted from album liner notes

Lacuna Coil

- Andrea Ferro - male vocals
- Cristina Scabbia - female vocals
- Marco Biazzi - lead guitar
- Cristiano Migliore - rhythm guitar
- Marco Coti Zelati - bass, keyboards (on Halflife bonus tracks)
- Cristiano Mozzati - drums, percussion, programming (on Halflife bonus tracks)

Production

- Waldemar Sorychta - production, engineering, mixing
- Matthias Klinkmann, Siggi Bemm - engineering
- Carsten Drescher - layout design
- Volker Beushausen - photography
- Dario Mollo - engineer (on Halflife bonus tracks)

== Charts ==
Chart	Peak position
German Albums Chart	72
