= Lacuna Coil =

Italian gothic metal band

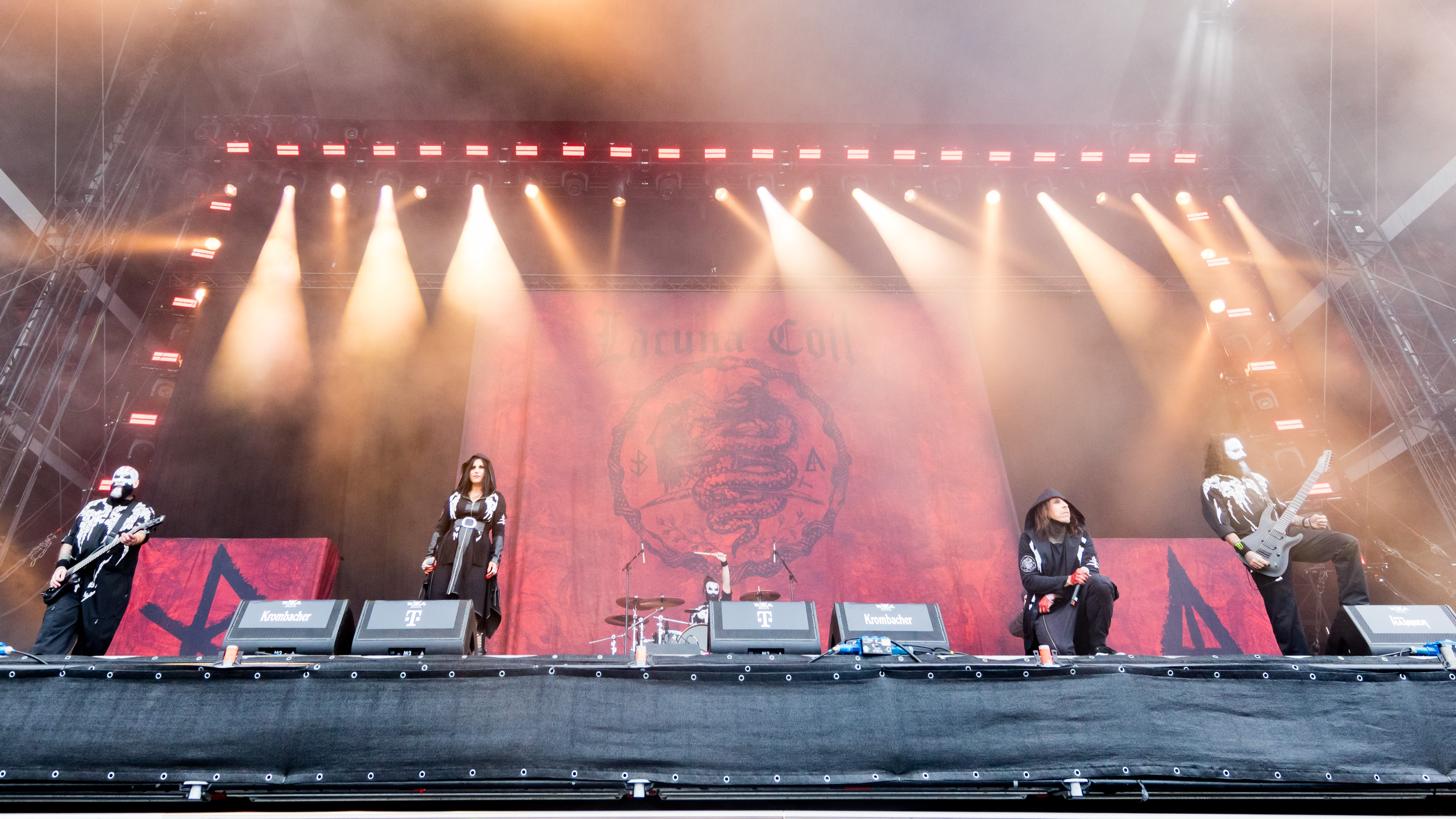
- Lacuna Coil performing in August 2022

Background information
- Also known as: Sleep of Right (1994–1995); Ethereal (1995–1997)
- Origin: Milan, Lombardy, Italy
- Genres: Gothic metal; alternative metal
- Years active: 1998–present
- Label: Century Media
- Members: Andrea Ferro; Marco Coti Zelati; Cristina Scabbia; Richard Meiz; Daniele Salomone
- Past members: Raffaele Zagaria; Claudio Leo; Leonardo Forti; Cristiano Migliore; Cristiano Mozzati; Marco Biazzi; Ryan Blake Folden; Diego Cavallotti
- Website: lacunacoil.com

Lacuna Coil is an Italian gothic metal band from Milan. They previously used the band names Sleep of Right and Ethereal. They have recorded ten studio albums, two extended plays, two live albums, two compilation albums, one video album, and sixteen singles and music videos.

The band have toured internationally and were nominated in 2006 for a MTV Europe Music Award. They won the 2012 Metal Female Voices Fest Award for the Best Album, the 2016 Metal Hammer Award for the Best International Band, and the 2018 Metal Hammer Golden Gods Award for Best Live Act. Their 2012 release, Dark Adrenaline, peaked at number 15 on the Billboard 200. As of March 2012, Lacuna Coil have sold over two million albums worldwide.

== History ==
=== Formation and debut EP (1994–1998) ===
Vocalist Andrea Ferro and bassist/composer Marco Coti Zelati formed Sleep of Right in Milan, Italy, 1994, and recruited Raffaele Zagaria on guitars, and Michaelangelo Algardi on the drums. After recording a song titled "Bleeding Souls" for the Noise of Bolgia compilation in 1995, Claudio Leo became the band's second guitarist, and Leonardo Forti replaced Michaelangelo on the drums after his departure. The band asked Cristina Scabbia, a friend, and girlfriend of Coti Zelati at the time, to sing background vocals briefly, which led to her officially joining the band. Soon after, the band changed their name to Ethereal, and signed to Century Media at the end of 1997. Finding that the name Ethereal was already taken by a Greek band, they changed their name to Lacuna Coil, meaning "empty spiral", "which reflected the band's vision on life".

Lacuna Coil released a self-titled EP through Century Media in 1998, shortly after Raffaele Zagaria, Claudio Leo, and Leonardo Forti departed. As a result, guitarist Cristiano Migliore and drummer Cristiano Mozzati were recruited officially. At this point, the band was touring with Moonspell after the release of the Lacuna Coil EP.

=== In a Reverie (1998–2000) ===
Following a second European tour, the band recorded their debut full-length album In a Reverie and added second guitarist Marco Biazzi. The band supported the album with another European tour, co-headlining with Skyclad. AllMusic rated the album 4 stars, saying it was "a fine debut by a band that bears watching." The band toured mostly around Europe, generally as a support act.

=== Halflife EP and Unleashed Memories (2000–2002) ===
Following their debut, In a Reverie, the EP Half-Life was released in 2000 with five songs: "Half Life", "Hyperfast", "Stars" (a cover of a Dubstar single), "Trance Awake" and a demo version of "Senzafine". The final version of the latter was included in the 2001 album Unleashed Memories. While the studio album contained 10 songs, later re-releases included the Halflife EP. That same year, the band toured the United States for the first time, supporting Moonspell.

=== Comalies (2002–2005) ===
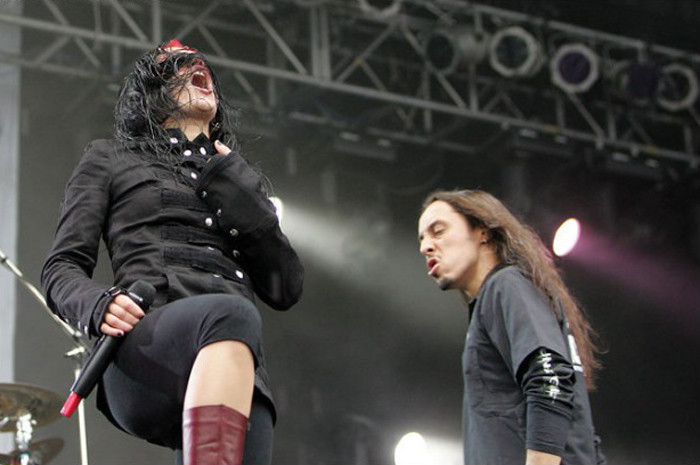
Cristina Scabbia (left) and Andrea Ferro performing at the 2005 M'era Luna Festival

The band's breakthrough album Comalies was released in 2002. A significant player on Europe's metal scene for nearly a decade at this point, the band was virtually unknown in the United States. The TV series Uranium gave the band some of its earliest US exposure; over a year later, the first single from Comalies, "Heaven's a Lie", began to receive radio and media attention, pulling the band into North America's musical mainstream. They kicked off their first headlining U.S. tour in 2003, supported by Dog Fashion Disco. Networks such as Fuse played the song's video, for example. In early 2005, "Heaven's a Lie" won in The 4th Annual Independent Music Awards for Best Hard Rock/Metal Song. The beginning of this song was also used as the introduction music for the audio podcast novel The Rookie by Scott Sigler. The second single, "Swamped", was played in heavy rotation and used in the video game Vampire: The Masquerade - Bloodlines. It also appeared on the soundtrack for the movie Resident Evil: Apocalypse. Videos were filmed for both songs and broadcast on MTV2's Headbangers Ball, which also saw the band perform an acoustic rendition of "Heaven's a Lie" live.

By 2004, Comalies had become the best-selling CD in Century Media's history. The band appeared at Ozzfest in between headlining club tours in the United States and Europe. A bonus, extended version of Comalies was released both in stores and on iTunes. This version consisted of both live and acoustic versions of the songs "Heaven's A Lie", "Swamped", "Unspoken", "Aeon" and "Senzafine" from Unleashed Memories.

=== Karmacode (2005–2008) ===
The band and label postponed the release of their follow-up to Comalies, Karmacode, to early 2006. According to the band's website, this made it possible for more time to be spent on production and to avoid the crowded summer 2005 release schedule for metal albums. On 23 December 2005 the band announced on their web site that all recording, mixing, and mastering on Karmacode had been completed. It was then announced that Karmacode would be released in the United States on 4 April 2006.

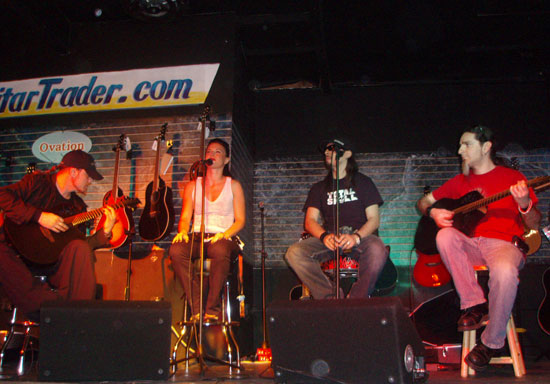
Lacuna Coil performing in San Diego

During their 2005 European Tour, Lacuna Coil debuted two new songs from Karmacode at selected concerts: "Our Truth" and "Fragile" under the working titles "Antonio" and "A2" respectively.

Karmacode debuted at number 28 on the Billboard 200. Considered by Billboard to be "the biggest album in the history of Century Media Records", it was acclaimed by music critics and magazines. Corresponding with the release of the new album, Lacuna Coil toured with Rob Zombie throughout North America in early 2006. After their tour with Zombie, they performed main stage at Ozzfest 2006 along with System of a Down, Ozzy Osbourne, and Hatebreed, becoming the first female-fronted band to co-headline the heavy-metal festival. That summer they also played on the main stage of the Download Festival (a three-day music festival in England's Donington Park), which was headlined by Metallica, Tool, and Guns N' Roses. That December, Lacuna Coil teamed up with In Flames, The Sword and Seemless for a US tour, as well as The Blackest of the Black 2006 Tour.

Four singles were officially released from Karmacode: "Our Truth", "Closer", "Within Me" and a cover of Depeche Mode's "Enjoy the Silence". "Our Truth" was the first single released and had a music video produced for it. The song was featured on the Underworld: Evolution soundtrack and entered the top forty on the Billboard Mainstream Rock chart in the United States. It's also present as an on-disc song for Rock Band 2 and Guitar Hero World Tour.

The band toured extensively to support the album throughout 2007. This included the Jägermeister Music Tour, The Hottest Chicks in Metal Tour 2007, Loudpark Festival '07 in Saitama City's Saitama Super Arena, and the Australian leg of Megadeth's Gigantour.

Lacuna Coil's first live DVD was released in November 2008, entitled Visual Karma (Body, Mind and Soul). The CD/DVD package is a retrospective of all things from the band's Karmacode album cycle. The set list features concerts filmed at Germany's Wacken Festival and at the Japanese Loudpark Festival in 2007.

=== Shallow Life (2008–2010) ===
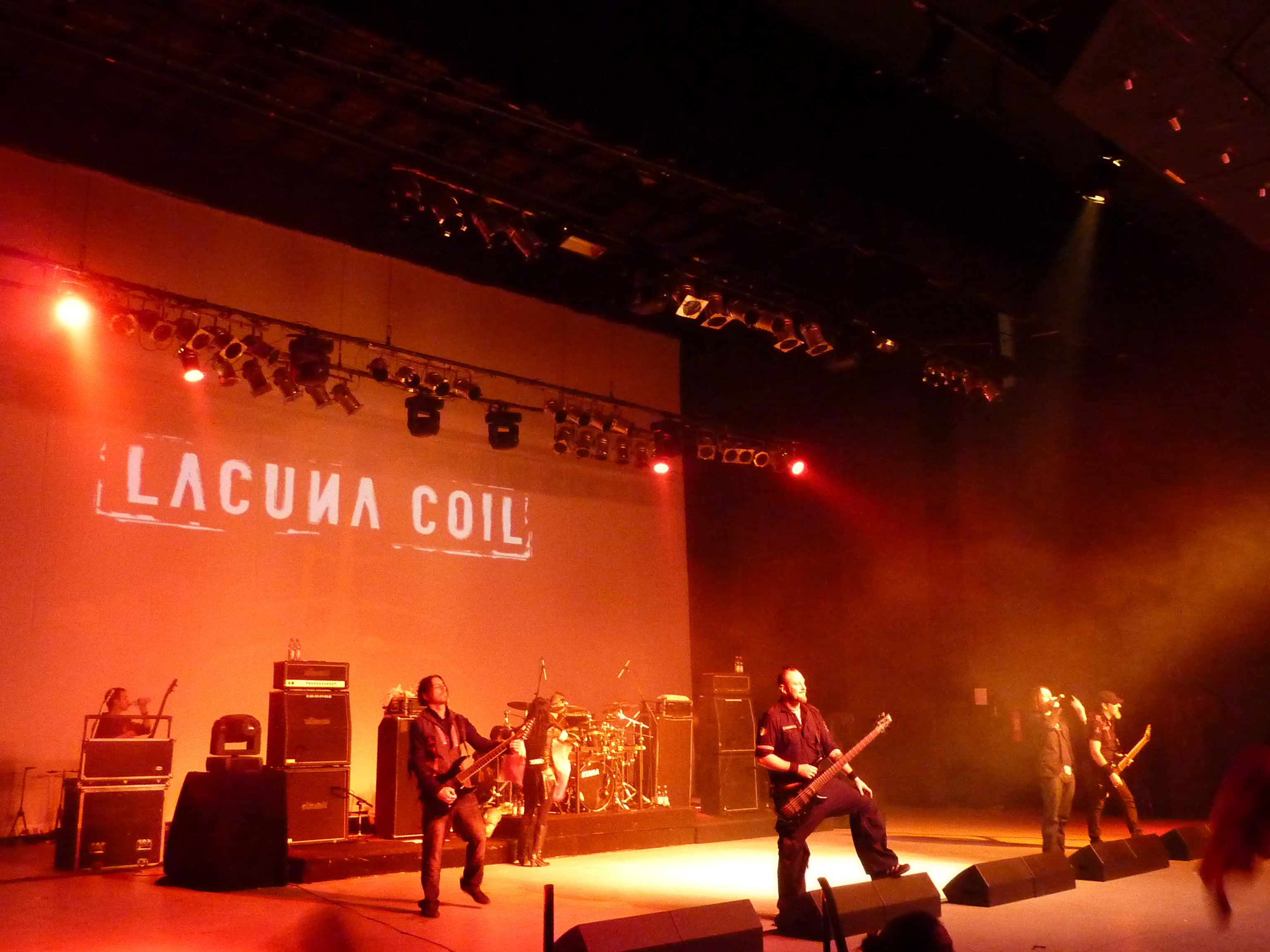
Lacuna Coil performing in Chile in June 2010

In 2008, it was announced that Lacuna Coil's fifth studio album would be produced by Don Gilmore and would include some Arabic influences. Cristina Scabbia explained in the magazine Rock Sound: "It's different, but it's our style. We haven't done anything absolutely different from our style, because that wouldn't be natural, that would be weird - it wouldn't be us. The songs are definitely more powerful, more complete, more intense, more straight-to-the-point." Andrea Ferro said: "We've put more attention on the real meaning of the songs, so the vocals are a bit more prominent. We've worked a lot with Don Gilmore on the pronunciation of the words in English, so people really understand the meanings of the words. There are strong choruses, where people can relate and really understand what we mean."

On 13 December 2008, it was revealed that the new album would be titled Shallow Life. The album was released in Europe on 20 April 2009 and in the United States on 21 April 2009. It debuted at number 16 on the Billboard Top 200 Album Chart, and became Lacuna Coil's first Top 20 album in the U.S. As of September 2009, it has sold nearly 70,000 copies in the United States.

In February and March 2009, Lacuna Coil played at the Australian music festival Soundwave alongside metal acts including DevilDriver, In Flames, Lamb of God, and Nine Inch Nails. The festival spanned five capital cities, at which they performed their single "Spellbound" from Shallow Life for the first time. Early June saw them play in the UK at Download Festival. Their set was scheduled for the opening day, where they would play on the second stage just before Opeth and later Mötley Crüe. Later in July 2009, Lacuna Coil embarked on the American Spellbound Tour, alongside Kill Hannah, Seventh Void, and Dommin. This was Lacuna Coil's first U.S. headlining run in over two years and the first tour the band has been on since the Music as a Weapon Tour IV alongside Disturbed, Killswitch Engage, and Chimaira in early 2009. During Early 2010 (Jan/Feb) the band came to the United Kingdom to do a Headline "Shallow Life" tour with their support acts Dommin and Dirty Little Rabbits. They then returned to the UK again in September/October 2010 headlining the "Survive" tour, this time at more intimate/VIP venues, with the support act Slaves to Gravity.

=== Dark Adrenaline (2011–2012) ===
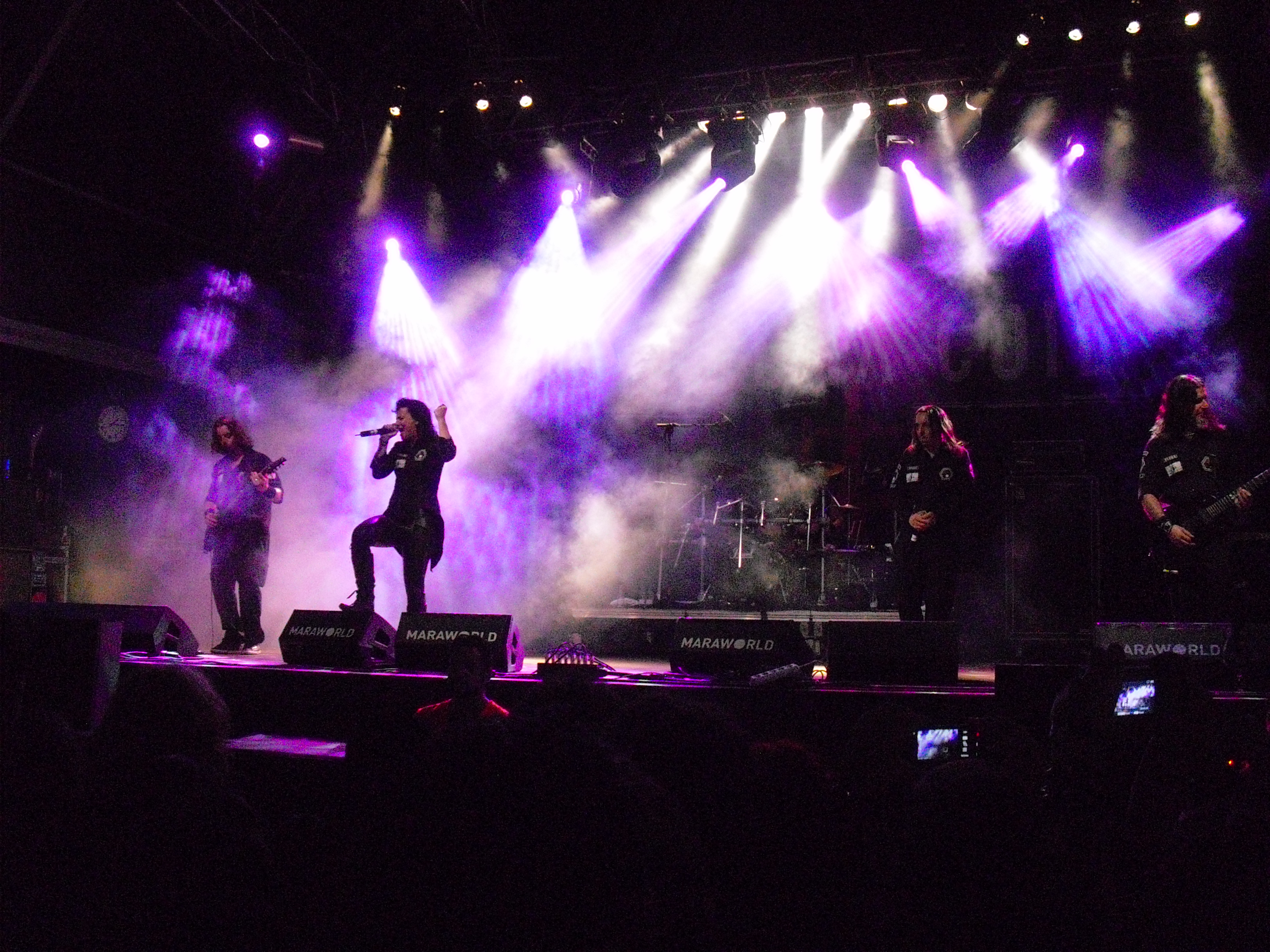
Lacuna Coil performing live at the Costa de Fuego festival in Benicàssim in 2012

A new album that was in the works since the first quarter of 2011 was confirmed with its title later being revealed as Dark Adrenaline. Produced by Don Gilmore and mixed by Marco Barusso. On 2 September 2011, it was announced that the first single from the record, titled "Trip the Darkness", was released digitally on 17 October 2011, with the album's release following on 24 January 2012. The album's third single, "End of Time", was released on 12 December 2012; the music video for the song was shot in Italy on 17 October 2012.

=== Broken Crown Halo (2013–2015) ===
In September 2013, the band announced the start of recording their new album with the producer Jay Baumgardner. Lacuna Coil announced the title of their upcoming album, Broken Crown Halo, due for release 1 April in North America.

The first track of their new album called "Nothing Stands In Our Way" was premiered online. On 14 February 2014, the band announced via their Facebook page that their guitarist Cristiano "Pizza" Migliore and drummer Cristiano "Criz" Mozzati decided to retire from the band after 16 years, citing personal reasons. Ryan Folden (The Agony Scene, Burn Halo, Enterprise Earth, After Midnight Project) has since joined the band.

=== Delirium and Black Anima (2015–2022) ===
On 8 December 2015, it was announced that the band were recording a new album, titled Delirium, produced by Marco Coti Zelati and mixed by Marco Barusso. On 8 April 2016, Lacuna Coil premiered the song "The House of Shame" and announced the release of the album on 27 May 2016. On 21 July 2016, Lacuna Coil presented the album's second single "Delirium" as a music video, followed by their third single "Blood, Tears, Dust", as a music-action video on 22 March 2017, and their fourth single, "You Love Me 'Cause I Hate You" on 15 May 2017. On 9 December 2016, Lacuna Coil premiered a new Christmas-themed song titled "Naughty Christmas" as a stand-alone single. On 14 January 2016, Lacuna Coil announced the amicable departure of longtime guitarist Marco Biazzi. On 11 April 2016, during an Italian press tour, Cristina Scabbia and Andrea Ferro presented Diego Cavallotti as the new live guitarist for the forthcoming tour. On 15 July 2019, Ryan Folden announced via social-media that he was stepping back as a full time member, adding that he did not work on Black Anima. The band has been working with drummer Richard Meiz of Genus Ordinis Dei until a permanent replacement is named On 11 October 2019 the band released the album Black Anima, containing the singles "Layers of Time", "Reckless" and "Save Me".

In July 2020, it was announced that Lacuna Coil had plans to stream a live show in their home city of Milan, where they were to perform their latest album Black Anima in full for the first time, amid the COVID-19 pandemic.

In April 2021, the band announced the release of a new live album on 25 June 2021, to be called Live from the Apocalypse. The album included the track "Bad Things", which previously was an Amazon exclusive.

=== Comalies XX (2022–2023) ===
On 15 July 2022, it was announced that the band would release an LP titled Comalies XX, with "deconstructed and transported" versions of original songs from their 2002 release, Comalies. It was released on 14 October 2022. Andrea Ferro stated that this would be considered a special project rather than their 10th studio album. On 19 July 2022 the band released the first single for the LP, "Tight Rope XX" along with a video clip. The reworked track was also played live for the first time at US music festival; INKcarceration a week prior.

=== Sleepless Empire (2023–present) ===
Lacuna Coil performing in 2023

On 1 April 2023, the band announced their contribution of a new song titled 'Never Dawn' to 'Zombicide: White Death', the latest board game Kickstarter project by game designer Nicolas Raoult and publisher CMON. The song is featured in the game's soundtrack and is the band's first involvement in a board game project. Zombicide: White Death is a cooperative survival board game set in the Arctic in the midst of a zombie outbreak. Lacuna Coil released a full version of their single "Never Dawn" on June 2.

In a September 2023 interview with KNAC, lead vocalist, Cristina Scabbia, revealed that the band had written five or six songs but decided to delay recording a full album, explaining, "We really base our inspiration on life, on experiences, and to be honest, we didn't want to write a record about the pandemic. We wanted to go out again, meet people, live experiences, live life, and get ready to bring everything into our music again. So, we've collected a ton of material."

On 19 April 2024, the band released their latest single, "In the Mean Time," featuring guest vocals by Ash Costello of New Years Day. According to the band, the track's message reflects concerns about the diminishing civility evident in contemporary society: "We're navigating through a tumultuous era where many seem to have lost their way. Our world is marred by strife and sorrow, with individuals grappling with feelings of isolation, anxiety, and despair. The external pressures bear down heavily, obscuring our vision and clouding our judgment."

A music video directed by Patric Ullaeus and starring Andreas Barås accompanied the release.

The single was already available on all digital platforms before the release of the music video.

The song and video were released shortly before Lacuna Coil headed out on a headline US tour with special guests New Years Day and additional support coming from Oceans of Slumber. The band hit big festival stages at Rockville, Sonic Temple, and the Milwaukee Metal Festival.

Costello expressed gratitude, stating, "I am deeply honored to join Lacuna Coil on tour for the first time, to have the incredible opportunity to lend my guest vocals to a new track and appear in the music video. Working alongside the powerhouse vocalist Cristina has been a privilege, and I may be biased in saying that 'In the Mean Time' has quickly become my favorite by Lacuna Coil. Its message about embracing individuality and not conforming deeply resonates with me."

On the same day, Lacuna Coil announced a tour in the United Kingdom and Ireland called "In the Meantime," scheduled from 15 October 2024 to 26 October 2024 with support from Finnish nu metal band, Blind Channel.

On 2 October 2024, Lacuna Coil released the single, "Oxygen", and on 9 January 2025, released the single for "Gravity" ahead of their tenth studio album, Sleepless Empire. The album was released on 14 February 2025, through Century Media Records.

== Musical style ==
Lacuna Coil's music has been described as being "heavy, melodic, and relentlessly melodramatic". Inspired by the combination of gothic imagery and music, the members have been known, musically, for composing mid-tempo songs consisting of prominent guitar lines and contrasting dual female/male vocal harmonies to help create a melodic, detached sound. Much of the band's recent material, however, sees a heavier and more down-tuned style, featuring a more distinct bass line and a higher mixing of the guitars within the songs.

Lacuna Coil's music is mainly regarded as gothic metal and alternative metal. AllMusic's Steve Huey said that "Lacuna Coil aren't always the doomiest of progressive goth metal bands; in fact, they sometimes sound like a heavier version of Heart". AllMusic said that the band "distinguished themselves with orchestral arrangements and dual vocalists." According to VH1, "Goth-spooked Italian maestros Lacuna Coil boasts the most distinctive and dynamic male-female vocal duo in contemporary hard-and-heavy music making: Andrea Ferro and Cristina Scabbia, respectively". AllMusic's Mike DaRonco said, "With Ferro's tortured screams and Scabbia's ethereal range, the group attracted a devoted following that soon spread outside of Italy and throughout Europe before they broke into the U.S. market". AllMusic's Andy Hinds wrote, "Rarely succumbing to heavy-handedness, Lacuna Coil escapes the stylistic straitjacket of the goth/metal formula, making them more accessible than many of their peers."

Comalies marked the beginning of a shift in the band's sound, as their "early repurposing of gothic metal evolved into something bigger, heavier and more accessible, it turned them into major players". According to Blabbermouth, "the band's mastery of a certain strain of highly melodic but intermittently brutal gothic metal [on Comalies] enabled them to streak ahead of their peers" The band subsequently shifted to an alternative metal sound. Karmacode saw the band move away from their distinctive sound in favor of a nu metal sound. Sputnikmusic staff writer Trey wrote that the album "presented a band struggling to move beyond minor league success even if it meant losing their own individuality". The band's follow-up, Shallow Life, was described by AllMusic as a "deliberately commercial effort with strong pop-metal influences". Following the band's more experimental recordings, Dark Adrenaline saw the band combine "elements of the traditional Lacuna Coil sound [with] the more modern elements of later years". Loudwire says that some of the band's albums have displayed a hard rock sound.

== Awards and nominations ==
Year	Award	Category	Nominated work	Result
2006	MTV Europe Music Awards	Best Italian Act	Lacuna Coil	Nominated
2012	Revolver Golden Gods Award	Best International Band	Lacuna Coil	Nominated
2012	Female Metal Voices Fest Award	Best Album 2012	Dark Adrenaline	Won
2016	Metal Hammer Awards (Germany)	Best International Band	Lacuna Coil	Won
2018	Metal Hammer Golden Gods Awards	Best Live Act	Lacuna Coil	Won

== Band members ==
Current

- Andrea Ferro — male vocals (1994–present)
- Marco Coti Zelati — bass, keyboards, studio guitars (1994–present)
- Cristina Scabbia — female vocals (1996–present)
- Richard Meiz — drums, studio synthesizer sounds (2019–present)
- Daniele Salomone — guitars (2024–present)

Former

- Michaelangelo Algardi — drums (1994–1995)
- Raffaele Zagaria — lead guitar (1994–1998)
- Claudio Leo — rhythm guitar (1995–1998; died 2013)
- Leonardo Forti — drums (1996—1998)
- Cristiano "Pizza" Migliore — rhythm guitar (1998–2014)
- Cristiano 'Criz' Mozzati — drums (1998–2014)
- Marco "Maus" Biazzi — lead guitar (1999–2016)
- Ryan Blake Folden — drums (2014–2019; touring 2012–2013)
- Diego "Didi" Cavalotti — guitars (2016–2024)

Live

- Anders Iwers — guitars (1997)
- Steve Minelli — guitars (1998)
- Alice Chiarelli — keyboards (1998)

== Discography ==
Studio albums:

- In a Reverie (1999)
- Unleashed Memories (2001)
- Comalies (2002)
- Karmacode (2006)
- Shallow Life (2009)
- Dark Adrenaline (2012)
- Broken Crown Halo (2014)
- Delirium (2016)
- Black Anima (2019)
- Sleepless Empire (2025)
