= Andrea Ferro =

Italian singer

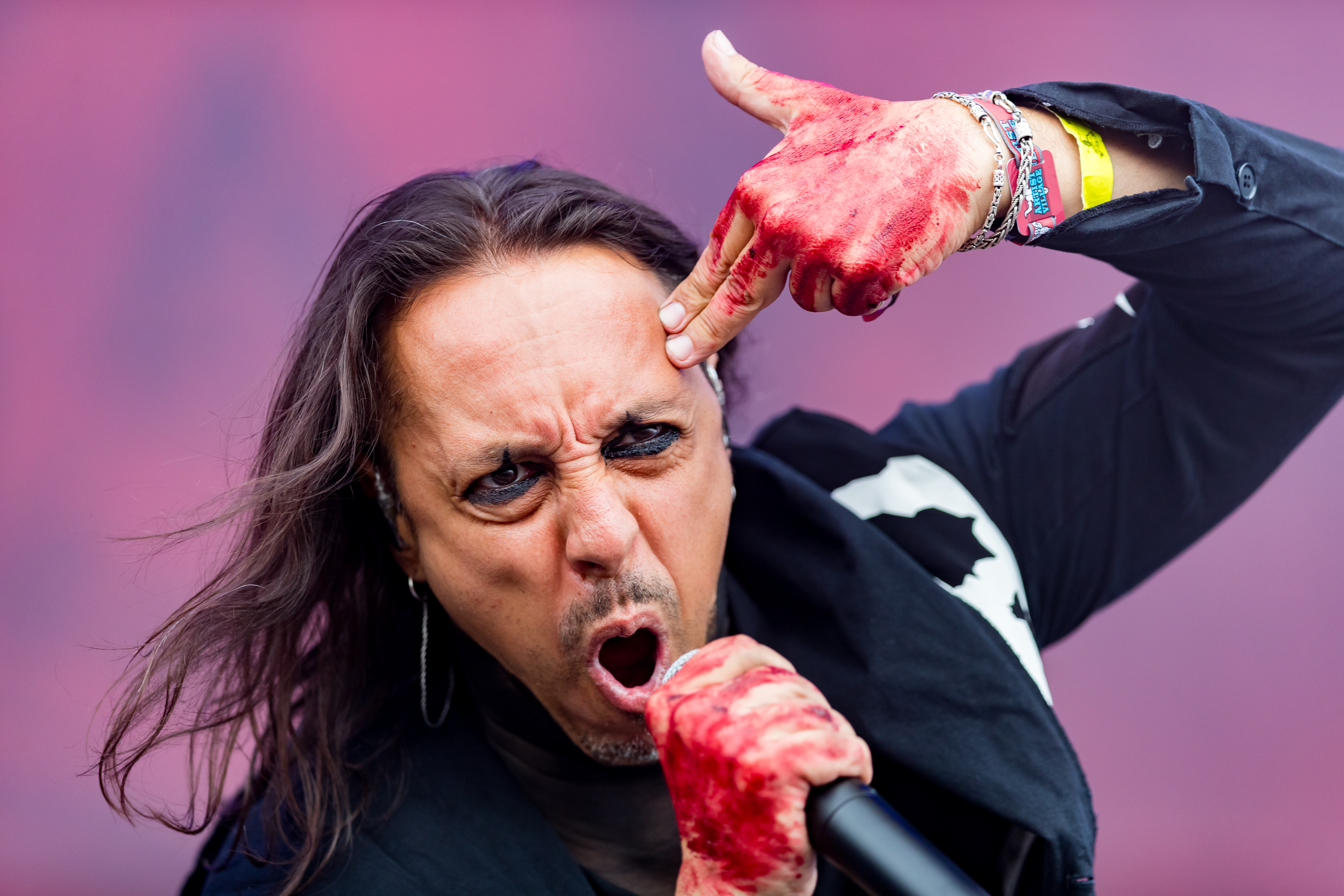
- Ferro with Lacuna Coil at Wacken Open Air 2022

Background information
- Born: 19 August 1973 (age 52); Arona, Piedmont, Italy
- Genres: Gothic metal; alternative metal
- Occupations: Singer
- Years active: 1994–present
- Member of: Lacuna Coil
- Website: lacunacoil.it

Andrea Gaetano "Andy" Ferro (born 19 August 1973) is an Italian singer, best known as the male vocalist and one of the founding members of the gothic metal band Lacuna Coil.

== Biography ==
Ferro founded Lacuna Coil with Marco Zelati in 1994 under the name Sleep of Right (they would also use Ethereal as their band name before Lacuna Coil). The two formed the band during the winter in Zelati's house when it was "too cold to skate". At first, the band covered classics with just a guitar and vocals; eventually, they became more interested in music than skating, Ferro said, "because of the age and the girls and all the injuries". When they met Cristina Scabbia and heard she could sing, they invited her to try backup vocals. Upon hearing her sing, Ferro and Zelati asked her to join the band. In 1998, Lacuna Coil released their first EP, and in 1999, after the departure of Raffael Zagaria, Claudio Leo, and Leonardo Forti and the recruitment of Cristiano Migliore and Cristiano Mozzati, Lacuna Coil had their current line-up.

On the songwriting for Lacuna Coil, Ferro has said that it is "a process that is always evolving" and described it as "democratic", as some of the parts that he has written, Cristina adapts to her voice and sings, and some of the parts she has written, he sings. Ferro has also changed his vocal style quite a bit over time; on their earlier albums up to Unleashed Memories, he had a tendency to use death growls for many songs, but over time, he began to use mostly clean vocals. His death growls return in recent albums, from Delirium onwards.

Ferro is featured in the Cayne song "Through the Ashes". He is also the featured artist in the I.P.E.R. song "Ancora in piedi".

He married his longtime girlfriend, Paola Penny Gigliotti, in September 2012.

== Guest work ==
Title	With
"Through the Ashes"	Cayne
"Ancora in piedi"	I.P.E.R.
