= Cristina Scabbia =

Italian singer (born 1972)

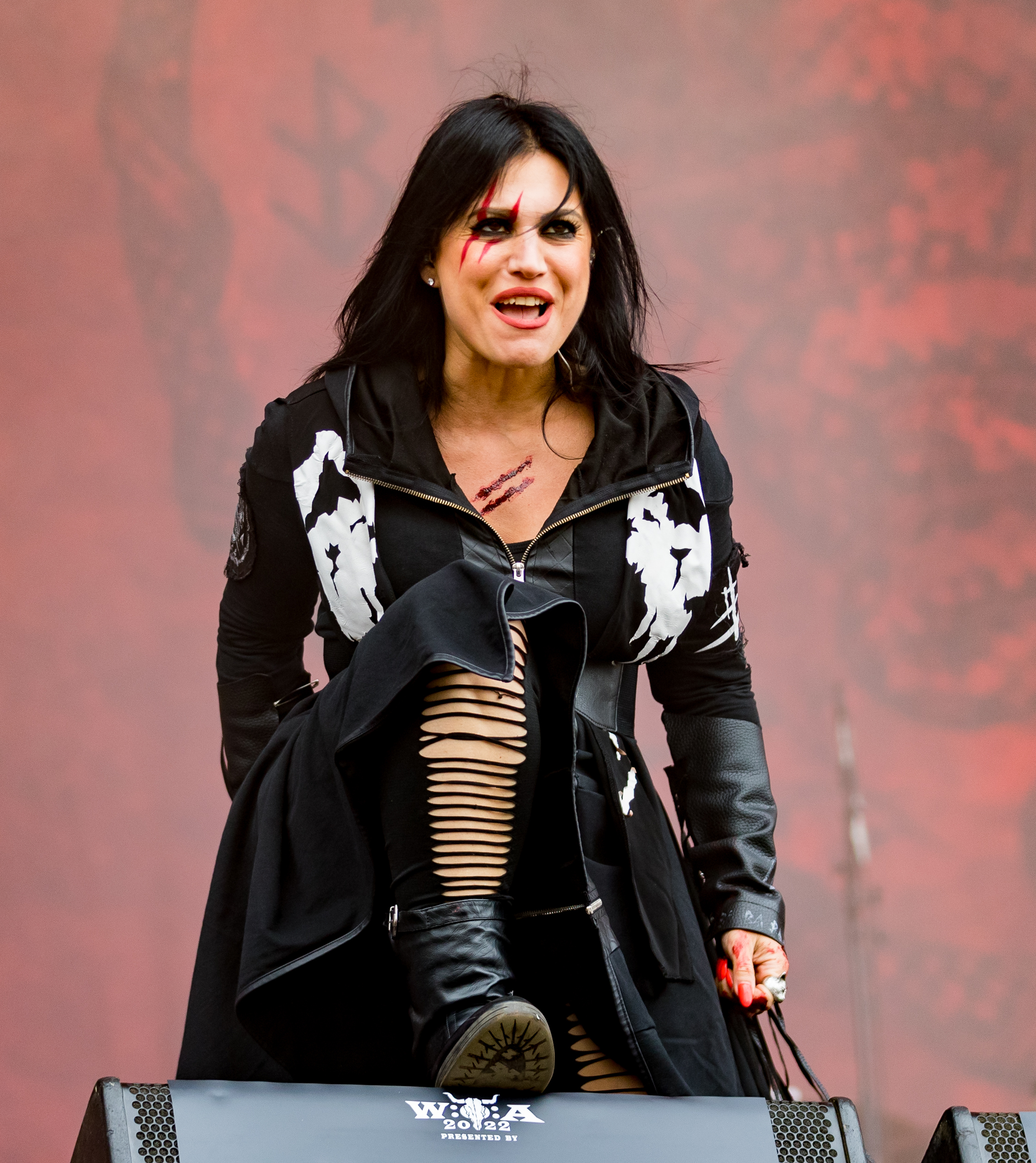
- Scabbia in 2022

Background information
- Born: Cristina Adriana Chiara Scabbia; 6 June 1972 (age 54); Milan, Lombardy, Italy
- Genres: Gothic metal; alternative metal
- Occupations: Singer; songwriter
- Years active: 1991–present
- Label: Century Media
- Member of: Lacuna Coil
- Website: lacunacoil.it

Cristina Adriana Chiara Scabbia (Italian: [kriˈstiːna adriˈaːna ˈkjaːra ˈskabbja]; born 6 June 1972) is an Italian singer. She is one of the two vocalists of gothic metal band Lacuna Coil.

Scabbia used to write an advice column in the rock magazine Revolver, alongside musician Vinnie Paul. Scabbia is featured in a Megadeth song "À Tout le Monde (Set Me Free)". She also featured on The Theory of Everything, an album from Arjen Anthony Lucassen's Ayreon project, with which she is cast as the Mother. She is also the featured artist in the Apocalyptica song "S.O.S. (Anything But Love)" and another version of the Alter Bridge song "Watch Over You". Scabbia performed a duet with the Italian ex-singer of Linea 77 Emiliano Audisio on the track "Beautiful Lie" to be part of the soundtrack for the 2013 Italian film Passione sinistra.

== Lacuna Coil ==
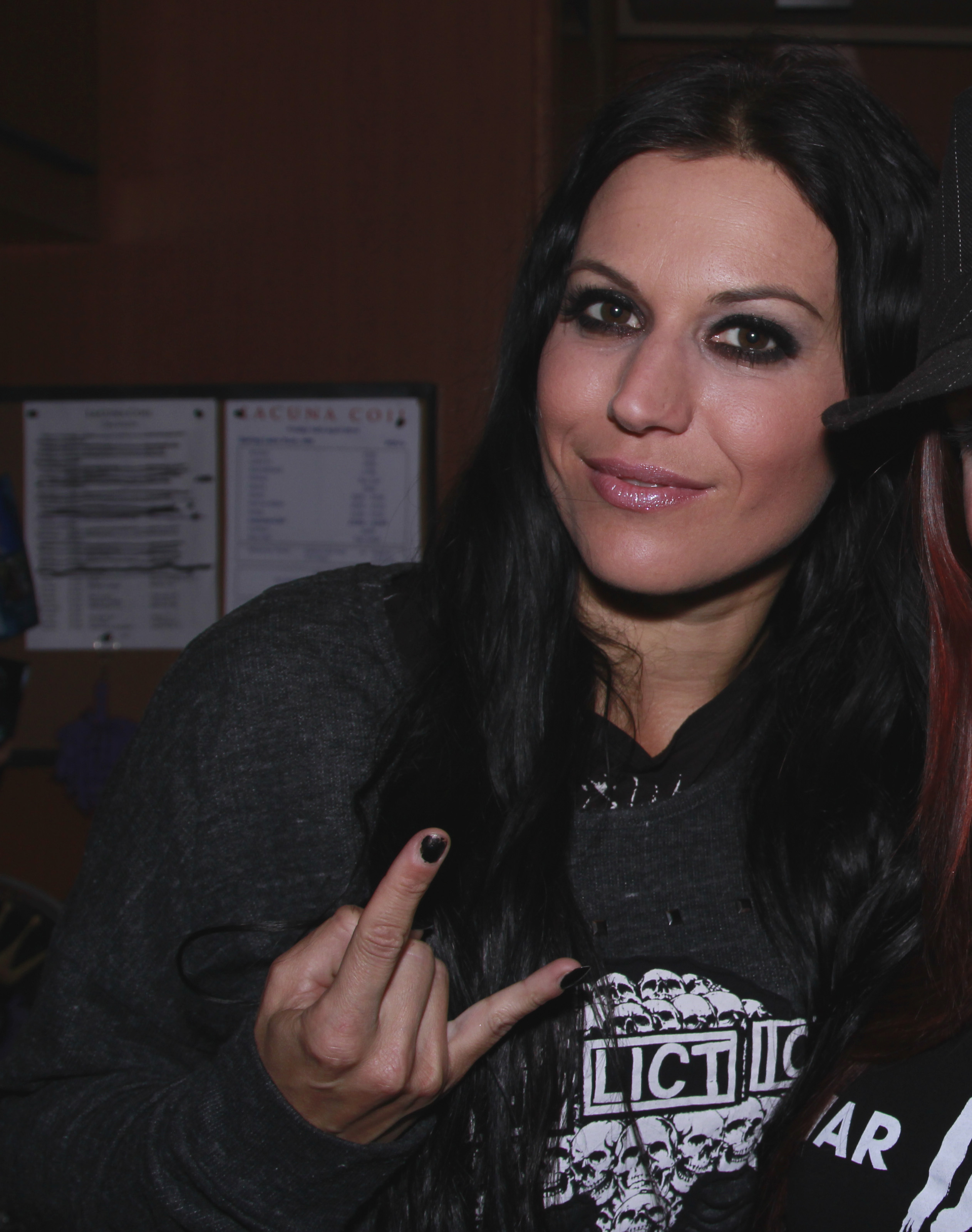
Cristina Scabbia in 2014

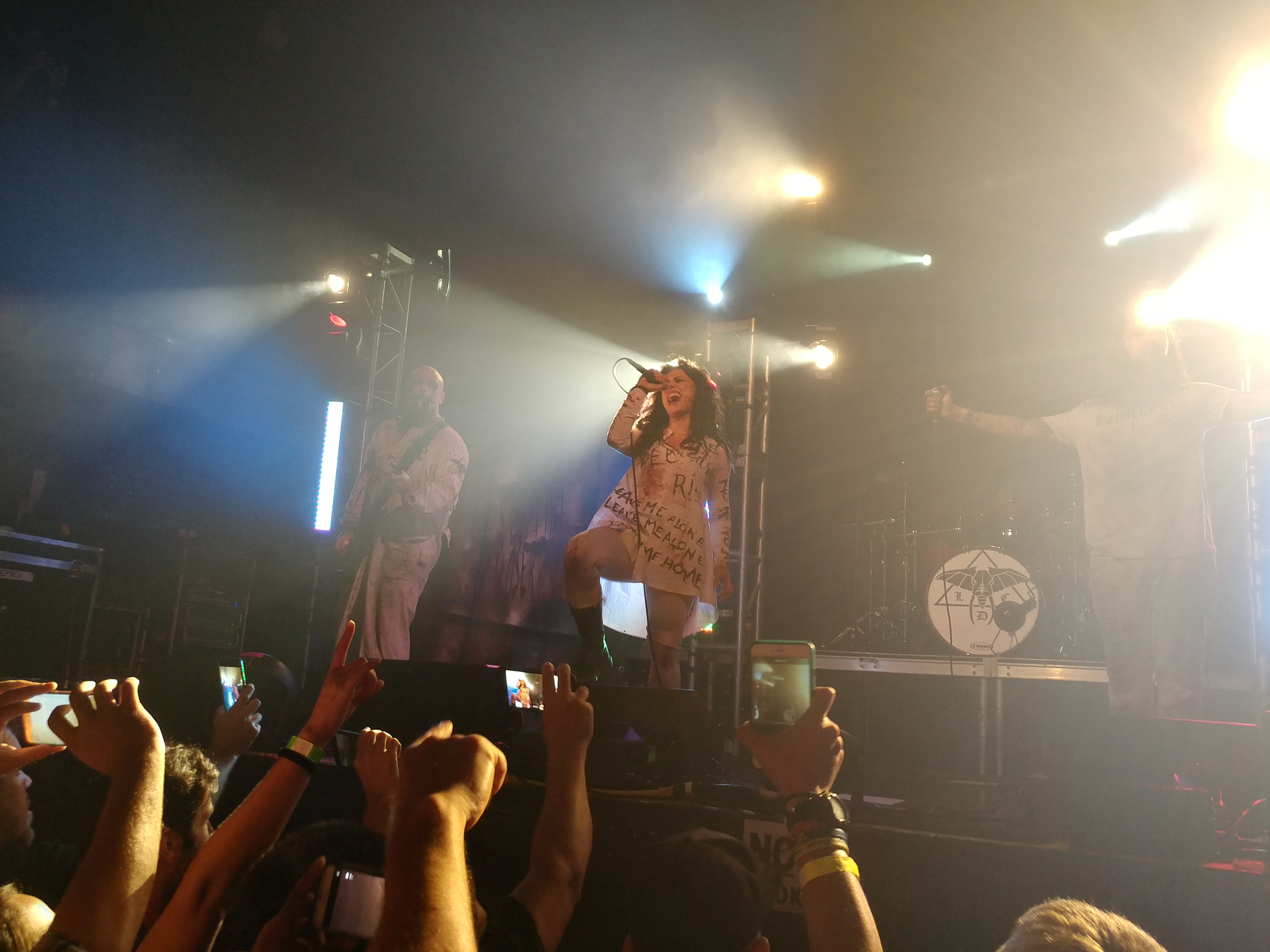
Scabbia performing with Lacuna Coil at Revolution Live, Fort Lauderdale, Florida in 2017

External videos
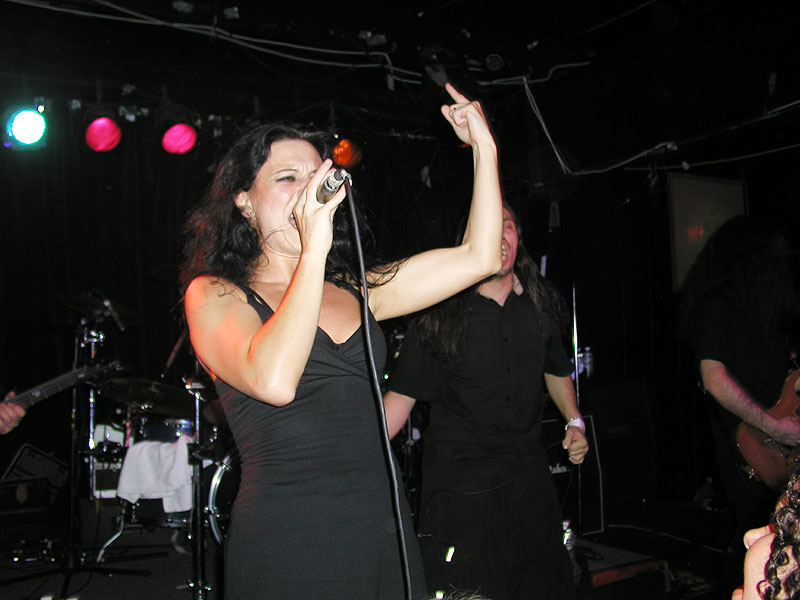
- Lacuna Coil's Cristina Scabbia - Wikipedia: Fact or Fiction?, Loudwire

In 1991, Scabbia began singing professionally as a touring musician for other bands and providing backing vocals. Later that year, she met the male vocalist Andrea Ferro and bass player Marco Coti Zelati of Lacuna Coil in Milan's Midnight club and started dating Marco after. At the time, the band was named Ethereal, and Scabbia was asked to do vocals by Marco. She recorded vocals on the demo tapes and was then invited to be a permanent member.

After several changes in the band's line-up, the members were reduced to Ferro, Coti Zelati and Scabbia. The members recorded a two-track demo in May 1996, and were soon signed by the German branch of Century Media, eventually joining with the American branch of the label. Once signed, the band changed their name to Lacuna Coil after learning that a Greek band signed to Century Media had already claimed the name Ethereal. Adding new band members, Lacuna Coil released their first album in 1999.

== Other work ==
Songs performed by Cristina Scabbia feature in the Dream of the Beast downloadable content (DLC) for the video game Metal: Hellsinger.

Scabbia also provided vocals for Kevin Sherwood's "Destroy Something Beautiful", featured in Call of Duty: Black Ops 6.

== Guest work ==
Title	With
The Theory of Everything	Ayreon
"Beautiful Lie"	Emiliano Audisio
"Nell'acqua"	Rezophonic
"Watch Over You"	Alter Bridge
"Basta!"	L'Aura feat. Rezophonic
"S.O.S. (Anything But Love)"	Apocalyptica
"À Tout le Monde (Set Me Free)"	Megadeth
"Can You Hear Me?", "Nell'acqua" & "Dalla a me"	Rezophonic
"I'm That"	Franco Battiato
"Scars"	Metal Allegiance
"I Breathe"	Schiller
"Wild Woman"	Danko Jones
"Goodbye Stranger" & "Feliz Navidad (Charity Version)"	Tarja
"Salem"	Genus Ordinis Dei
"Monster"	Wednesday 13
"We Are the Souls"	Francesco Riolo feat. VaatiVidya
"Start Again" & "Di male in peggio"	Mark the Hammer
"Loneliness"	Alessandro Galdieri
"Christina" & "Is Real"	Look Outside Your Window
"Dream of the Beast"	Two Feathers
"Destroy Something Beautiful"	Kevin Sherwood
"We Might Be Giants"	Saltatio Mortis
