= Kalmet =

Family name

Kalmet is a predominantly Estonian language surname. Notable people with this surname include:

- Gita Kalmet (born 1959), Estonian diplomat and actress
- Henrik Kalmet (born 1986), Estonian actor and comedian
- Karl-Andreas Kalmet (born 1989), Estonian actor
- Leo Kalmet (1900–1975), Estonian theatre director
- Madis Kalmet (born 1955), Estonian actor and theatre director
