= Eesti otsib superstaari season 5 =

Season of Estonian television series

Eesti otsib superstaari
- Season 5
- Hosted by: Karl-Andreas Kalmet; Henrik Kalmet
- Judges: Mihkel Raud; Maarja-Liis Ilus; Mart Sander
- Winner: Rasmus Rändvee
- Runner-up: Elina Born
- Finals venue: Nokia Concert Hall, Tallinn

Release
- Original network: TV3
- Original release: September 2 – December 23, 2012

Season chronology
- ← Previous; Season 4

The fifth season of Eesti otsib superstaari premiered on September 2, 2012, on TV3.

On May 30, 2011, TV3 announced that the fifth season for Eesti otsib superstaari will start in autumn 2012. Two of three judges from the fourth season, Mihkel Raud and Maarja-Liis Ilus continued their job in the fifth season. Rein Rannap, one of the judges from the first series, was replaced by Mart Sander, Estonian singer, actor, director, author and television host.

As for all the previous seasons, new hosts were introduced. Brothers Karl-Andreas Kalmet and Henrik Kalmet, two new Estonian actors, took the role.

The winner of the fifth season was Rasmus Rändvee.

== Auditions ==
Auditions for the fifth season will take place in Narva (August 11, 2012), Viljandi (August 18), Tallinn (August 25–26) and Tartu (September 1–2).

== Theatre rounds ==
Theatre rounds took place at club Rock Café in Tallinn. Total of 88 auditionees had qualified to the theatre round. Theatre round was divided into three rounds. First round all 88 contestants had to sing one more time a capella to the judges. Half of the contestants were sent home after the first round.

In the second round, contestants were divided into trios and duos by gender. Girl groups could sing either Demi Lovato's "Skyscraper" or Lauri Saatpalu's "Tagareas". Boys had to choose between Koit Toome's "Allikas" and James Brown's "I Got You (I Feel Good)". Based on the performances, the contestants were divided into three groups. First group qualified automatically to the studio rounds, skipping the third theatre round. Second group qualified to the third round and third group was eliminated.

In the third round, girls had to sing either Lenna Kuurmaa's "Mina jään", Loreen's "Euphoria" or Mahavok's "Mägede hääl". Boys had to choose between Ott Lepland's "Kuula", Nirvana's "Smells Like Teen Spirit" and 2 Quick Start's "Ühega miljoneist".

A total of ten female and ten male contestants qualified to the studio rounds.

== Semi-finals aka Studio rounds ==
The studio rounds took place on October 7, 14 and 21. In the first studio round 10 girls performed and in the second 10 boys performed. After nationwide televote, three participants from each semi-final qualified to the finals. The judges then chose 10 participants from the first two rounds to the third round. Televoters voted three of them to the finals, tenth finalist was chosen by the judges as a wildcard.

=== First week ===
Girls' round took place on October 7, 2012.

Contestants' performances
Act	Order	Song	Result
Anisa Vänikver	1	Price Tag by Jessie J	Qualified
Tuuli Rand	2	Elu pärast by Liisi Koikson	Saved by judges
Getter Pärle	3	Son of a Preacher Man by Dusty Springfield	Did not qualify
Getter-Heleen Aron	4	Because of You by Kelly Clarkson	Saved by judges
Kadri Erlenheim	5	Empire State of Mind (Part II) Broken Down by Alicia Keys	Saved by judges
Liis Reisner	6	Single Ladies (Put a Ring on It) by Beyoncé	Saved by judges
Katrina Tammiksalu	7	War Pigs by Black Sabbath	Saved by judges
Kristin Karu	8	Big Girls Don't Cry by Fergie	Did not qualify
Katrin Ruuse	9	Pumped Up Kicks by Foster the People	Qualified
Elina Born	10	Somewhere Over The Rainbow by Judy Garland	Qualified

=== Second week ===
Boys' week took place on October 14, 2012.

Contestants' performances
Act	Order	Song	Result
Karl-Erik Taukar	1	"Learn to Fly" by Foo Fighters	Saved by judges
Karl Madis Pennar	2	Sa haara kinni mu käest by Tõnis Mägi & Music Seif	Saved by judges
Fredi Pärs	3	"Who You Are" by Jessie J	Qualified
Samuel Reinaru	4	"Jailhouse Rock" by Elvis Presley	Did not qualify
Janek Valgepea	5	"Before It Explodes" by Charice	Qualified
Rasmus Rändvee	6	"Valgus" by Gunnar Graps	Saved by judges
Karl Mihkel Salong	7	"Sexy and I Know It" by LMFAO	Saved by judges
Toomas Kolk	8	"Saatanlik naine" (Devil Woman) by Jaak Joala (Cliff Richard)	Saved by judges
Artjom Jevstafjev	9	"Whataya Want from Me" by Adam Lambert	Did not qualify
Carl-Philip Madis	10	"Your Song" by Elton John	Qualified

=== Third week ===
The second chance semi-final took place on October 21, 2012.

Contestants' performances
Act	Order	Song	Result
Getter-Heleen Aron	1	"Kel on laulud laulda" by Ruja	Did not qualify
Toomas Kolk	2	"Stars"' from the musical Les Misérables	Qualified
Tuuli Rand	3	"We Found Love" by Rihanna	Did not qualify
Karl Mihkel Salong	4	"Jäljed" by Tõnis Mägi	Did not qualify
Katrina Tammiksalu	5	"Must lind" by Ruja	Did not qualify
Karl Madis Pennar	6	"With or Without You" by U2	Did not qualify
Kadri Erlenheim	7	"Ära piina mind" by Blacky	Did not qualify
Rasmus Rändvee	8	"Use Somebody" by Kings of Leon	Wildcard
Liis Reisner	9	"Igatsuse meri" by Ruja	Qualified
Karl-Erik Taukar	10	"Nagu merelaine" by Silvi Vrait	Qualified

== Finals ==
=== Week 1 ===
The first final show took place on 28 October 2012. The theme of the show was "Big songs". Participants sang the biggest hits of all time.

Contestants' performances
Act	Order	Song	Result
Katrin Ruuse	1	"Sweet Dreams (Are Made of This)" by Marilyn Manson	Eliminated
Janek Valgepea	2	"Kui mind enam ei ole" by Urmas Alender	Bottom Three
Toomas Kolk	3	"A Little Less Conversation" by Elvis Presley	Safe
Liis Reisner	4	"Sorry Seems To Be The Hardest Word" by Elton John	Bottom Two
Rasmus Rändvee	5	"Crazy" by Gnarls Barkley	Safe
Carl-Philip Madis	6	"Hello" by Lionel Richie	Safe
Fredi Pärs	7	"One" by U2	Safe
Anisa Vänikver	8	"Hero" by Mariah Carey	Safe
Karl-Erik Taukar	9	"Free Fallin'" by Tom Petty	Safe
Elina Born	10	"Nothing Compares 2 U" by Sinéad O'Connor	Safe

=== Week 2 ===
The second final show took place on 4 November 2012. Contestants sang a hit from their year of birth.

Contestants' performances
Act	Order	Song	Result
Karl-Erik Taukar	1	"Mina pean sambat tantsida saama" by Singer Vinger	Safe
Anisa Vänikver	2	"Any Man of Mine" by Shania Twain	Safe
Janek Valgepea	3	"Always" by Bon Jovi	Bottom three
Carl-Philip Madis	4	"Life Is a Highway" by Tom Cochrane	Eliminated
Rasmus Rändvee	5	"Kiss from a Rose" by Seal	Safe
Elina Born	6	"Cryin'" by Aerosmith	Bottom two
Fredi Pärs	7	"I Can't Make You Love Me" by Bonnie Raitt	Safe
Toomas Kolk	8	"(I've Had) The Time of My Life" by Bill Medley and Jennifer Warnes	Safe
Liis Reisner	9	"I Will Always Love You" by Whitney Houston	Safe

=== Week 3 ===
The third final show took place on 11 November 2012. Contestants sang Estonians' favourite songs.

Contestants' performances
Act	Order	Song	Result
Fredi Pärs	1	"Kas tead, mida tähendab" by Birgit Õigemeel	Safe
Liis Reisner	2	"Olematu laul" by Helgi Sallo	Bottom two
Karl-Erik Taukar	3	"Venus" by Claire's Birthday	Safe
Toomas Kolk	4	"Oma laulu ei leia ma üles" by Metsatöll	Safe
Anisa Vänikver	5	"Sind otsides" by Tõnis Mägi	Eliminated
Janek Valgepea	6	"Cool Vibes" by Vanilla Ninja	Bottom three
Elina Born	7	"Tule kui leebe tuul" by Seitsmes meel	Safe
Rasmus Rändvee	8	"Aita mööda saata öö" by Rock Hotel (originally "Help Me Make It Through the Night" by Kris Kristofferson)	Safe

=== Week 4 ===
The fourth final show took place on 18 November 2012. Contestants sang films' soundtracks.

Contestants' performances
Act	Order	Song	Result
Rasmus Rändvee	1	"The House of the Rising Sun" from the film "Casino"	Safe
Karl-Erik Taukar	2	"Live and Let Die" from the film "Live and Let Die"	Bottom two
Liis Reisner	3	"Seven Nation Army" from the film "G.I. Joe: Retaliation"	Eliminated
Janek Valgepea	4	"Aria" from the film "Momo"	Safe
Toomas Kolk	5	"Moon River" from the film "Breakfast at Tiffany's"	Safe
Elina Born	6	"Skyfall" from the film "Skyfall"	Bottom three
Fredi Pärs	7	"Purple Rain" from the film "Purple Rain"	Safe

=== Week 5 ===
The fifth final show took place on 25 November 2012. Contestants sang songs together with Bel-Etage Swing Orchestra. As one of the judges, Mart Sander, is the conductor of Bel-Etage Swing Orchestra, he was not on the judges panel and was replaced by guest judge Heidy Purga, who was also a judge on the first and second season of the show.

Contestants' performances
Act	Order	Song	Result
Toomas Kolk	1	"Theme from New York, New York" by Liza Minnelli	Safe
Fredi Pärs	2	"God Bless the Child" by Billie Holiday	Bottom two
Janek Valgepea	3	"Save the Last Dance for Me" by The Drifters	Eliminated
Rasmus Rändvee	4	"Feeling Good" by Cy Grant	Safe
Karl-Erik Taukar	5	"Can't Take My Eyes Off You" by Frankie Valli	Safe
Elina Born	6	"Cry Me a River" by Julie London	Safe

=== Week 6 ===
The sixth final show took place on December 2, 2012. Contestants sang a song by Jaak Joala and a rock classic.

Contestants' performances
Act	Order	First song (by Jaak Joala)	Order	Second song	Result
Fredi Pärs	1	"Ausus" (originally "Honesty" by Billy Joel)	6	"Whole Lotta Love" by Led Zeppelin	Eliminated
Toomas Kolk	2	"Suveöö"	7	"Holy Diver" by Dio	Safe
Elina Born	3	"Nii kokku me ei saagi eal"	8	"Poison" by Alice Cooper	Safe
Rasmus Rändvee	4	"Unustuse jõel"	9	"Come Together" by The Beatles	Bottom Two
Karl-Erik Taukar	5	"Vildist kübar" (originally "Homburg" by Procol Harum)	10	"I Want It All" by Queen	Safe

=== Week 7 ===
The seventh final show took place on December 9, 2012. Contestants sang a dance track from Power Hit Radio's playlist. For the second song, acts were each mentored by one of the previous winners of the show. Elina Born was mentored by Ott Lepland (winner of season 3), Karl-Erik Taukar by Jana Kask (season 2), Rasmus Rändvee by Liis Lemsalu (season 4) and Toomas Kolk by Birgit Õigemeel (season 1).

Contestants' performances
Act	Order	First song	Order	Second song	Result
Toomas Kolk	1	"I Kissed a Girl" by Katy Perry	5	"Can't Help Falling in Love" by Elvis Presley	Safe
Karl-Erik Taukar	2	"Feel" by Robbie Williams	6	"Born This Way" by Lady Gaga	Eliminated
Rasmus Rändvee	3	"We Are Young" by fun.	7	"Losing My Religion" by R.E.M.	Safe
Elina Born	4	"Why Don't You Love Me" by Beyoncé	8	"Cruz" by Christina Aguilera	Bottom two

=== Week 8 ===
The eight final show took place on December 16, 2012. Contestants sang a Christmas song and a duet with a celebrity. Celebrity duets:

- Toomas Kolk with Liisi Koikson
- Rasmus Rändvee with Tatjana Mihhailova
- Elina Born with Lenna Kuurmaa

Contestants' performances
Act	Order	Christmas song	Order	Celebrity duet	Result
Toomas Kolk	1	"Let It Snow! Let It Snow! Let It Snow!"	4	"Where the Wild Roses Grow" by Nick Cave and the Bad Seeds and Kylie Minogue	Eliminated
Rasmus Rändvee	2	"Do You Hear What I Hear?"	5	"Kids" by Robbie Williams and Kylie Minogue	Safe
Elina Born	3	"Jõuluöö" ("O Holy Night")	6	"Imagine" by John Lennon	Safe

=== Week 9: Super Final ===
The Super Final show takes place on December 23, 2012. Contestants will sing their favourite song they had performed before in the show, a "big" Estonian song and their own first single. Both singles were participants of "Eesti Laul 2013". Rasmus Rändvee's single was performed together with Rasmus' band Facelift Deer.

Contestants' performances
Act	Order	Favourite song	Order	Own Single	Order	Estonian song	Result
Elina Born	1	"Nothing Compares To You" by Sinéad O'Connor	3	"Enough"	5	"Palve" by Tõnis Mägi	Runner-up
Rasmus Rändvee	2	"Feeling Good" by Cy Grant	4	"Dance"	6	"Meil aiaäärne tänavas"	Winner

== Elimination chart ==
Legend
Female	Male	Top 20	Top 10	Winner

Safe	Bottom Three	Bottom Two	Eliminated	Wild Card Choice	Did Not Perform

Stage:		Semi Finals		Wild; Card	Finals								
Week:		10/7	10/14	10/21	10/28	11/04	11/11	11/18	11/25	12/02	12/09	12/16	12/23
Place	Contestant	Result											
1	Rasmus Rändvee		Saved	Judges						Bottom 2			Winner
2	Elina Born	Top 10				Bottom 2		Bottom 3			Bottom 2		Runner-up
3	Toomas Kolk		Saved	Viewers								Elim	
4	Karl-Erik Taukar		Saved	Viewers				Bottom 2			Elim		
5	Fredi Pärs		Top 10						Bottom 2	Elim			
6	Janek Valgepea		Top 10		Bottom 3	Bottom 3	Bottom 3		Elim				
7	Liis Reisner	Saved		Viewers	Bottom 2		Bottom 2	Elim					
8	Anisa Vänikver	Top 10					Elim						
9	Carl-Philip Madis		Top 10			Elim							
10	Katrin Ruuse	Top 10			Elim								
Wild; Card	Getter-Heleen Aron	Saved		Elim									
Wild; Card	Kadri Erlenheim	Saved		Elim									
Wild; Card	Karl Madis Pennar		Saved	Elim									
Wild; Card	Karl Mihkel Salong		Saved	Elim									
Wild; Card	Katrina Tammiksalu	Saved		Elim									
Wild; Card	Tuuli Rand	Saved		Elim									
Semi	Artjom Jevstafjev		Elim										
Semi	Samuel Reinaru		Elim										
Semi	Getter Pärle	Elim											
Semi	Kristin Karu	Elim											

== Ratings ==
Episode	Date	Official rating	Weekly rank
Auditions 1	9 September	128,000	7-8
Auditions 2	16 September	Unknown (Did not reach top 10 of the week)	
Auditions 3	23 September	Unknown (Did not reach top 10 of the week)	
Theatre Rounds	30 September	Unknown	13
Semi-final 1	7 October	136,000	9
Semi-final 2	14 October	Unknown (Did not reach top 10 of the week)	
Semi-final 3	21 October	Unknown (Did not reach top 10 of the week)	
Final 1	28 October	Unknown (Did not reach top 10 of the week)	
Final 2	4 November	Unknown (Did not reach top 10 of the week)	
Final 3	11 November	Unknown (Did not reach top 10 of the week)	
Final 4	18 November	Unknown (Did not reach top 10 of the week)	
Final 5	25 November	Unknown (Did not reach top 10 of the week)	
Final 6	2 December	Unknown (Did not reach top 10 of the week)	
Final 7	9 December	Unknown	14
Final 8	16 December	152,000	8
