= Rannap =

Rannap is an Estonian surname. It was included in the List of Estonian protected surnames (abandoned in 2001). Notable people with the surname include:

- Jaan Rannap (1931–2023), Estonian children's writer and track-and-field athlete
- Rein Rannap (born 1953), Estonian composer and pianist
- Riinu Rannap (born 1956), Estonian zoologist
