= 2008 in Estonian television =

This is a list of Estonian television related events from 2008.

== Events ==
- 2 February - Kreisiraadio are selected to represent Estonia at the 2008 Eurovision Song Contest with their song "Leto svet". They are selected to be the fourteenth Estonian Eurovision entry during Eurolaul held at the ETV Studios in Tallinn.
- 8 June - Jana Kask wins the second season of Eesti otsib superstaari.

== Television shows ==
=== 1990s ===
- Õnne 13 (1993–present)

=== 2000s ===
- Eesti otsib superstaari (2007–present)

== Networks and services ==
=== Channels ===
==== New channels ====
- 24 March - TV6
- 8 August - ETV2
- 1 September - TV1000 Action East
