= Comalies XX =

Remix album by Lacuna Coil
- Released: 14 October 2022
- Studio: Noise Factory (Milan, Italy)
- Genre: Gothic metal; alternative metal; symphonic metal
- Length: 47:31
- Label: Century Media
- Producer: Marco Coti Zelati

Lacuna Coil chronology
Black Anima (2019)	Comalies XX (2022)	Sleepless Empire (2025)

Singles from Comalies XX
- 1. "Tight Rope XX" Released: 19 July 2022; 2. "Swamped XX" Released: 15 September 2022

Comalies XX is the first remix album by Italian gothic metal band Lacuna Coil. It was released by Century Media Records on 14 October 2022. The album is a rearranged re-recording of the band's 2002 album Comalies.

== Background ==
In June 2021, Cristina Scabbia, during an interview with Revolver magazine, talked about the hard situation for writing new music. "Everything we do in a regular life, in a normal life enriches us and gives us input that we can put in our music," she said. "And also we like to write together. So, if Marco creates the basis of the music together with the other musicians in the band, then Andrea and I jump in with the lyrics and vocal lines. But we do that together. We need to enter in songwriting mode. So we didn't really like the fact that we had to write separately just because we have to put a record [together] because it's quarantine. Now we are starting to collect ideas 'cause we feel a little bit happier."

On February 22, the band shared on Instagram a photo from a studio, recording a very special project.

On 9 May 2022, the band announced a one-night-only concert on 15 October 2022, at Fabrique in Milan, celebrating the 20th anniversary of their third studio album, Comalies.

The album title and track listing were revealed 15 July 2022. The album would not be just a re-recording of the Comalies songs, but rather the band stated that they would "deconstruct and transport them into 2022". The band released the first single from the album, "Tight Rope XX", on 19 July 2022. The second single, "Swamped XX", was released on 15 September 2022.

Professional ratings
Review scores
Source	Rating
Blabbermouth	8/10
Distorted Sound	7/10
Louder Sound	4/5 stars
MetalSucks	4/5 stars
Sputnikmusic	3.4/5 stars

== Track listing ==
All song written and composed by Lacuna Coil.

No.	Title	Length
1.	"Swamped XX"	3:33
2.	"Heaven's a Lie XX"	4:07
3.	"Daylight Dancer XX"	3:46
4.	"Humane XX"	3:41
5.	"Self Deception XX"	3:27
6.	"Aeon XX"	2:04
7.	"Tight Rope XX"	3:38
8.	"The Ghost Woman and the Hunter XX"	4:12
9.	"Unspoken XX"	3:39
10.	"Entwined XX"	3:51
11.	"The Prophet Said XX"	3:38
12.	"Angel's Punishment XX"	3:24
13.	"Comalies XX"	4:31
Total length:		47:31

CD 2
No.	Title	Length
1.	"Swamped"	4:00
2.	"Heaven's a Lie"	4:46
3.	"Daylight Dancer"	3:50
4.	"Humane"	4:12
5.	"Self Deception"	3:31
6.	"Aeon"	1:56
7.	"Tight Rope"	4:15
8.	"The Ghost Woman and the Hunter"	4:09
9.	"Unspoken"	3:37
10.	"Entwined"	3:59
11.	"The Prophet Said"	4:32
12.	"Angel's Punishment"	3:56
13.	"Comalies"	5:01
Total length:		51:44

== Personnel ==
Lacuna Coil

- Andrea Ferro – vocals (male)
- Cristina Scabbia – vocals (female)
- Richard Meiz – drums (tracks 1–1 to 1–13)
- Cristiano Mozzati – drums (tracks 2–1 to 2–13)
- Diego Cavallotti – guitars (tracks 1–1 to 1–13)
- Cristiano Migliore – rhythm guitar (tracks 2–1 to 2–13)
- Marco Emanuele Biazzi – lead guitar (tracks 2–1 to 2–13)
- Marco "Maki" Coti Zelati – bass, guitars, synth

Technical

- Waldemar Sorychta – production, engineering (tracks 2–1 to 2–13)
- Marco "Maki" Coti Zelati – production (tracks 1–1 to 1–13)
- Lacuna Coil – arrangements
- Marco D'Agostino – mastering (tracks 1–1 to 1–13)
- Marco Barusso – mixing (tracks 1–1 to 1–13)
- Georgia Viriglio – engineering (tracks 1–1 to 1–13)
- Marco Barusso – engineering (tracks 1–1 to 1–13)
- Marco "Maki" Coti Zelati – artwork
- Cunene – photography
- Doralba Picerno – photography
- Carsten Drescher - layout
- Eliran Kantor – variant artwork

== Charts ==
Chart performance for Comalies XX
Chart (2022)	Peak position
Swiss Albums (Schweizer Hitparade)	25
German Albums (Offizielle Top 100)	45
Scottish Albums (OCC)	64
UK Album Downloads (OCC)	39
UK Rock & Metal Albums (OCC)	10
US Top Album Sales	70
