= Swamped =

Swamped may refer to:

- Swamped (The Batman)
- "Swamped" (song), a 2004 song by Lacuna Coil
