= Nublu =

Nublu may refer to:

- Nublu (musician), Estonian rapper
- Nublu, 1972 Estonian book by Jaan Rannap
- Nublu Club, East Village, Manhattan, New York
