= Eesti otsib superstaari season 2 =

Season of television series

Eesti otsib superstaari
- Season 2
- Hosted by: Märt Avandi; Ott Sepp
- Judges: Mihkel Raud; Heidy Purga; Rein Rannap
- Winner: Jana Kask
- Runner-up: Arno Suislep
- Finals venue: Linnahall

Release
- Original network: TV3
- Original release: February 3 – June 8, 2008

Season chronology
- ← Previous; Season 1 Next → Season 3

The second season of Eesti otsib superstaari started on February 3, 2008 and lasted until June 2008. The hosts of first season were replaced by two male comedians/actors, Ott Sepp and Märt Avandi. Heidy Purga, Mihkel Raud and Rein Rannap continued as judges.

== Auditions ==
Auditions took place in same towns as in first season. The first audition took place in Pärnu on January 12, 2008. Three other auditions were held in Tartu, Jõhvi and Tallinn. Age limits were widened from 16–25 to 15–30. Unlike the first season, acoustic instruments were allowed to use in auditions. More than 2,300 people sang in the auditions. Only about 100 of them advanced to the theatre round.

== Theatre rounds ==
Theatre round took place in Eesti Nukuteater, Tallinn. 30 of 100 new singers were chosen by the judges to the semi-finals.

== Semi-finals ==
Unlike from the first season three semi-finals were held, plus a 'second chance' semi-final. The Semi-finals took place in Club Privé in Tallinn. Ten singers sang in each semi-final. After nationwide televoting, three of them qualified for the finals. Ten singers who failed to advance to the finals were given a second chance by the judges. Kristiina Piperal won the second chance round and was the tenth finalist.

Date
First
Second
Third
March 16
Timothy Jarman
Eliis Pärna
Taavi Immato
March 23
Norman Salumäe
Keit Triisa
Artur Rassmann
March 30
Kristjan Laas
Jana Kask
Arno Suislep
April 6

(Wildcard)

Kristiina Piperal
(Viewers Choice)

== Finals ==
During the finals 9 shows were aired on TV3. The finals took place in TV3 studio, Pärnu Concert Hall in Pärnu, Jõhvi Concert Hall in Jõhvi, Vanemuise Concert Hall in Tartu, Estonian National Opera concert hall in Tallinn and the Superfinale took place in Linnahall, Tallinn.

=== Finalists ===
(Ages stated at time of contest)

Contestant	Age	Hometown	Voted off	Liveshow theme
Jana Kask	16	Tallinn	Winner	Grand Finale
Arno Suislep	27	Haapsalu	8 June 2008	Grand Finale
Kristiina Piperal	16	Tallinn	1 June 2008	Duets
Artur Rassmann	19	Tallinn	25 May 2008	Ivo Linna/Tõnis Mägi & Billboard Chart
Norman Salumäe	16	Tallinn	18 May 2008	Rock & Disco
Eliis Pärna	18	Keila-Joa	11 May 2008	Frank Sinatra songs
Taavi Immato	19	Tallinn	4 May 2008	Unplugged
Kristjan Laas	18	Tallinn	27 April 2008	Estonian Songs
Timothy Jarman	22	Viljandi	22 April 2008	Hip Hop & R&B
Keit Triisa	16	Viljandi	13 April 2008	Film Hits

=== Top 10: Film music ===
- Keit Triisa – "Think" by Aretha Franklin from a film The Blues Brothers
- Timothy Jarman – "Sway" written by Pablo Beltrán Ruiz from a film Shall We Dance?
- Kirstjan Laas – "Come What May" by Ewan McGregor and Nicole Kidman from a film "Moulin Rouge!"
- Arno Suislep – "Tulen kord jälle" by Sven Grünberg from a film "Hundiseaduste aegu"
- Eliis Pärna – "Iris" by Goo-Goo Dolls from a film "City of Angels"
- Taavi Immato – "Lonely Day" by System of a Down from a film Disturbia
- Jana Kask – "Saviour" by Anggun from a film "Transporter 2"
- Artur Rassmaann – "You Could Be Mine" by Guns N' Roses from a film "Terminator 2: Judgment Day"
- Kristiina Piperal – "Zombie" by The Cranberries from a film "Blackrock"
- Norman Salumäe – "Grace Kelly" by Mika from a film "Knocked Up"

The bottom three: Keit Triisa, Eliis Pärna, Taavi Immato
The bottom two: Eliis Pärna, Keit Triisa
Eliminated: Keit Triisa

=== Top 9: Hip-Hop and R&B ===
- Norman Salumäe – "Señorita" by Justin Timberlake
- Kristiina Piperal – "Maneater" by Nelly Furtado
- Timothy Jarman – "Let Me Love You by Mario
- Kristjan Laas – "With You" by Chris Brown
- Jana Kask – "Underneath Your Clothes" by Shakira
- Artur Rassmann – "Killing Me Softly" by Fugees
- Arno Suislep – "Waiting for You" by Seal
- Eliis Pärna – "These Words" by Natasha Bedingfield
- Taavi Immato – "What Goes Around.../...Comes Around" by Justin Timberlake

The bottom three: Kristjan Laas, Timothy Jarman, Norman Salumäe
The bottom two: Norman Salumäe, Timothy Jarman
Eliminated: Timothy Jarman

=== Top 8: Estonian music ===
- Artur Rassmann – "Valgus" by Gunnar Graps
- Kristiina Piperal – "Jää" by Dagö
- Kristjan Laas – "Leekiv armastus" by Genialistid & Lea Liitmaa
- Taavi Immato – "See ei ole saladus" by Terminaator
- Jana Kask – "Palun andeks su käest" by Smilers
- Norman Salumäe – "Kui mind enam ei ole" by Urmas Alender
- Eliis Pärna – "Sinu hääl" by Liisi Koikson
- Arno Suislep – "Kurjuse laul" by Olav Ehala

The bottom three: Kristjan Laas, Jana Kask, Artur Rassmann
The bottom two: Jana Kask, Kristjan Laas
Eliminated: Kristjan Laas

=== Top 7: Unplugged ===
- Arno Suislep – "Ilmarine ja Dvigatel" by Ultima Thule
- Jana Kask – "My All" by Mariah Carey
- Taavi Immato – "Ordinary people" by John Legend
- Kristiina Piperal – "Creep" by Radiohead
- Norman Salumäe – "Fly Away" by Lenny Kravitz
- Artur Rassmann – "Hotel California" by Eagles
- Eliis Pärna – "Lumevärv" by Jäääär

The bottom three: Taavi Immato, Norman Salumäe, Arno Suislep
The bottom two: Taavi Immato, Norman Salumäe
Eliminated: Taavi Immato

=== Top 6: Frank Sinatra ===
- Eliis Pärna – "Girl From Ipanema"
- Arno Suislep – "All or Nothing at All"
- Jana Kask – "Strangers in the Night"
- Artur Rassmann – "Fly Me to the Moon"
- Norman Salumäe – "Love and Marriage"
- Kristiina Piperal – "Theme from New York, New York"

The bottom two: Artur Rassmann, Eliis Pärna
Eliminated: Eliis Pärna

=== Top 5: Rock & Disco ===
- Norman Salumäe – "Ära piina mind" by Lea Liitmaa
- Kristiina Piperal – "Naer" by Virmalised
- Artur Rassmann – "The Final Countdown" by Europe
- Jana Kask – "Je t'aime" by Lara Fabian
- Arno Suislep – "Massikommunikatsioon" by Singer Vinger
- Norman Salumäe – "I Promised Myself" by Nick Kamen
- Kristiina Piperal – "Girls Just Want to Have Fun" by Cyndi Lauper
- Artur Rassmann – "Ühega miljoneist" by 2 Quick Start
- Jana Kask – "I Feel Love" by Blue Man Group
- Arno Suislep – "Enjoy The Silence" by Depeche Mode

The bottom two: Kristiina Piperal, Norman Salumäe
Eliminated: Norman Salumäe

=== Top 4: Ivo Linna/Tõnis Mägi & Billboard Chart ===
- Artur Rassmann – "Kuldaja rock' n' roll" by Muusik Seif
- Jana Kask – "Laula mu laulu helisev hääl" by Ivo Linna
- Arno Suislep – "Aed" by Ultima Thule
- Kristiina Piperal – "Vana vaksal" by Ivo Linna
- Artur Rassmann – "I Still Haven't Found What I'm Looking For" by U2
- Jana Kask – "Lady Marmalade" by Christina Aguilera, Mýa, Pink, Lil' Kim
- Arno Suislep – "Spaceman" by Babylon Zoo
- Kristiina Piperal – "Nothing Compares To You" by Sinéad O'Connor

The bottom two: Artur Rassmann, Arno Suislep
Eliminated: Artur Rassmann

=== Top 3: Duets ===
- Kristiina Piperal – "Violet Hill" by Coldplay
- Arno Suislep – "Kosmoseodüsseia" by Vaiko Eplik ja Eliit
- Jana Kask – "Wake Up Call" by Maroon 5
- Kristiina Piperal with Lauri Saatpalu – "Kaks Takti Ette" by Dagö
- Arno Suislep with Lenna Kuurmaa – "Saatus naerdes homse toob" by Lenna Kuurmaa
- Jana Kask with Cram – "Swamped" by Lacuna Coil

Eliminated: Kristiina Piperal

=== Superfinal ===
- Jana Kask – "Uninvited" by Alanis Morissette
- Arno Suislep – "The World Is Not Enough" by Garbage
- Jana Kask – "Lady Marmalade" by Christina Aguilera, Mýa, Pink, Lil' Kim
- Arno Suislep – "Spaceman" by Babylon Zoo
- Jana Kask – "Ma tahan olla öö" by Jaan Tätte & Olav Ehala
- Arno Suislep – "Vaiki kui võid" by Ruja

Winner: Jana Kask
Runner-up: Arno Suislep

== Elimination chart ==
Legend
Did Not Perform	Female	Male	Top 30	Top 10	Winner

Safe	Safe First	Safe Last	Eliminated	Wild Card	Did Not Perform

Stage:		Semi			Wild; Card	Finals								
Week:		03/16	03/23	03/30	04/06	04/13	04/22	04/27	05/04	05/11	05/18	05/25	06/01	06/08
Place	Contestant	Result												
1	Jana Kask			2nd				Btm 2						Winner
2	Arno Suislep			3rd					Btm 3			Btm 2		Runner-Up
3	Kristiina Piperal			Elim	1st						Btm 2		Elim	
4	Artur Rassmann		3rd					Btm 3		Btm 2		Elim		
5	Norman Salumäe		1st				Btm 2		Btm 2		Elim			
6	Eliis Pärna	2nd				Btm 2				Elim				
7	Taavi Immato	3rd				Btm 3			Elim					
8	Kristjan Laas			1st			Btm 3	Elim						
9	Timothy Jarman	1st					Elim							
10	Keit Triisa		2nd			Elim								
Wild; Card	Karolin Minenko	5th			2nd									
Wild; Card	Kaidi Feldmann			5th	3rd									
Wild; Card	Karmen Korjus	4th			4th									
Wild; Card	Linda Zagorska		5th		5th									
Wild; Card	Anne Arrak		Elim		Elim									
Wild; Card	Anneli Arusalu	Elim			Elim									
Wild; Card	Karine Nõgisto	Elim			Elim									
Wild; Card	Mariliis Loos		Elim		Elim									
Wild; Card	Mari Ronimois			Elim	Elim									
Semi- Final 3	Fredi Kaasik			4th										
Semi- Final 3	Marey Utno			Elim										
Semi- Final 3	Mart Metsjõe			Elim										
Semi- Final 3	Märt Metsjõe			Elim										
Semi- Final 2	Dmitri Kurilov		4th											
Semi- Final 2	Jana Viital		Elim											
Semi- Final 2	Liana Matšukans		Elim											
Semi- Final 2	Toomas Pruunsild		Elim											
Semi- Final 1	Aleksei Aleksashkin	Elim												
Semi- Final 1	Eva Vaino	Elim												
Semi- Final 1	Rasmus Trull	Elim												

== After the show ==
After winning the show, Jana Kask started collaboration with Alar Kotkas and his team to finish Kask's debut album. On October 30, 2008, she released her first single "Leaving You For Me", which was said to be written by Swedish composers specially for Jana. Although later in the media it was found out that the song had been previously sung by Martin Kesici and Tarja Turunen.

One year after winning the show Jana Kask has not released her debut album. Kask has said that she has done anything and she don't know why the album has not released by her record company. Kask's producer Alar Kotkas explained that album has not been released due to the risks in the market, but was hopeful that album will be released during the summer of 2009.

In August 2009, when the auditions of third season of Eesti otsib superstaari had already begun, Jana's debut album had still not been released. Since Alar Kotkas had not released the album, Jana started collaboration with Ivar Must. In September 2009 Jana and her new manager Ivar Must, announced that debut album is completed. When album will be released is unknown at the moment.

One of few finalists who are still active in music industry is Taavi Immato, who got 7th place. Since June 2009, Immato is a singer in popular Estonian band, Shanon. Together with Shanon, Immato has released a debut album "Üksinda" (Alone).

Timothy Jarman, an English singer living in Estonia, who got 9th place in the finals, started his own record company. It is named Jarman Records. Jarman has released a debut single "You and Me".

Keit Triisa, who got 10th place in the finals, started acting career. In summer of 2009 Triisa acted in Ugala Theatre's summer play "Charley's Aunt". Also Kristjan Laas, who reached 8th place, has started his acting career in ETV's TV-series "Klass" (Class).

Preceded by Season 1 (2007)	Eesti otsib superstaari Season 2 (2008)	Succeeded by Season 3 (2009)
