= Gita Kalmet =

Estonian diplomat and actress

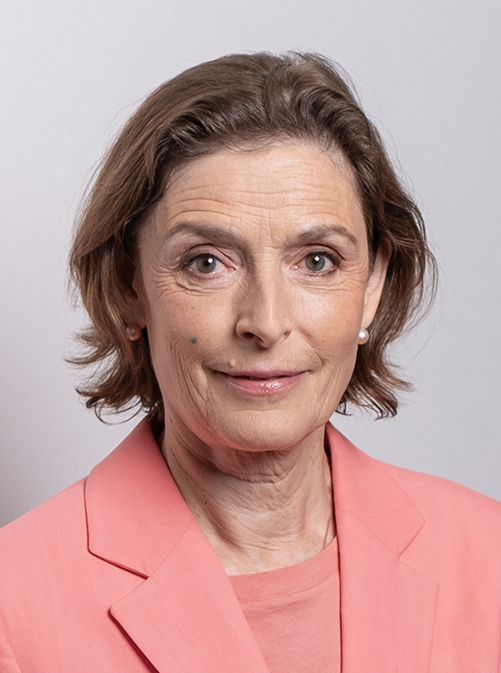
- Kalmet in 2024

Ambassador of Estonia to the Netherlands
- In office 2006–2011
- President: Toomas Hendrik Ilves
- Prime Minister: Andrus Ansip; Taavi Rõivas
- Preceded by: Peep Jahilo
- Succeeded by: Priit Pallum

Ambassador of Estonia to Canada
- In office 2013–2018
- President: Kersti Kaljulaid
- Prime Minister: Taavi Rõivas; Jüri Ratas; Kaja Kallas
- Preceded by: Marina Kaljurand
- Succeeded by: Toomas Lukk

Ambassador of Estonia to Czech Republic
- In office 2021–Present
- President: Kersti Kaljulaid; Alar Karis
- Prime Minister: Kaja Kallas
- Preceded by: Eva-Maria Liimets

Personal details
- Born: Gita Ränk; 29 November 1959 (age 66) Tallinn, then part of Estonian SSR, Soviet Union
- Spouse: Madis Kalmet
- Relatives: Henrik Kalmet and Karl-Andreas Kalmet (sons)
- Education: Tallinn State Conservatory; Estonian School of Diplomacy
- Occupation: Diplomat, actress and artist

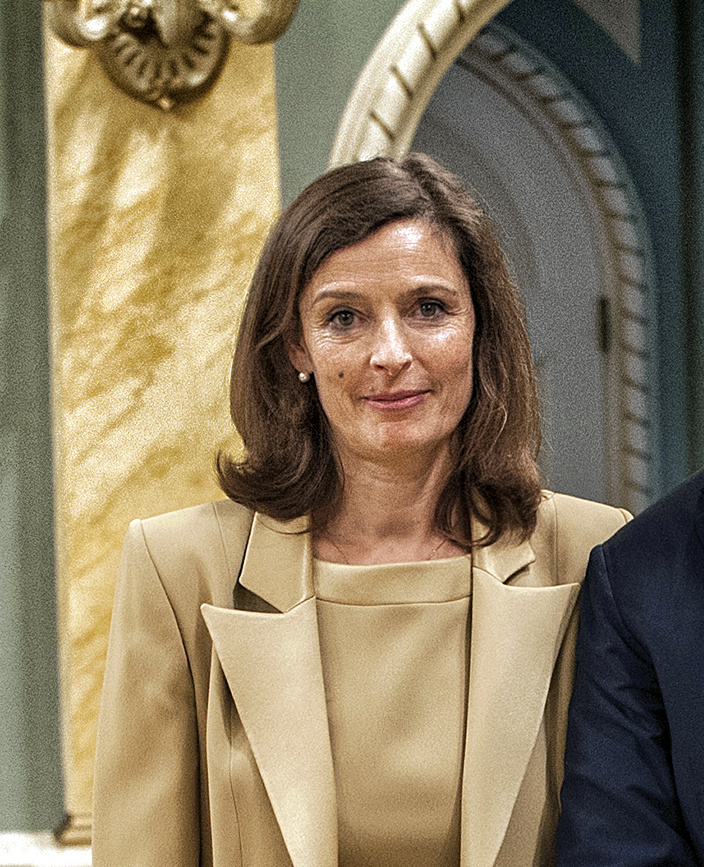
Kalmet in 2013

Gita Kalmet (until 1987, Gita Ränk; born on 29 November 1959 in Tallinn) is an Estonian diplomat and former actress.

In 1984, she graduated from Tallinn State Conservatory Stage Art Department. In 1993 she graduated from Estonian School of Diplomacy.

From 1984 to 1989, she worked at Rakvere Theatre. Besides theatre roles she played also in several films and on television.

Since 1993, she has been employed by the Estonian Foreign Ministry. She worked as a policy official at the Estonian embassy in Paris, France, between 1999 and 2002, and worked as an exchange diplomat in London, England, in 2005. From 2006 until 2011, she was Ambassador of Estonia to the Netherlands. From 2013 until 2018, she was Ambassador of Estonia to Canada and since August 2021 she was Ambassador of Estonia to Czech Republic.

She is married to director and actor Madis Kalmet. The couple have two sons, actors Henrik Kalmet and Karl-Andreas Kalmet.

== Filmography ==
Year	Films/Television Productions	Character	Ref
1989	I'm Not a Tourist, I'm Living Here		
1992	Hotell E	Alice	
1993	Candles in the Dark	Tina	
1993	Marraskuun harmaa valo		
1999	Kass kukub käppadele		
