= Eesti otsib superstaari season 1 =

Season of Estonian television series

Eesti otsib superstaari
- Season 1
- Hosted by: Aigi Vahing (:et); Jüri Nael
- Judges: Mihkel Raud; Heidy Purga; Rein Rannap
- Winner: Birgit Õigemeel
- Runner-up: Luisa Värk
- Finals venue: Pärnu kontserdimaja (Pärnu Concert Hall)

Release
- Original network: TV3
- Original release: March 11 – June 14, 2007

Season chronology
- Next → Season 2

The first season of Eesti otsib superstaari started on March 11, 2007 and continued until June 14, 2007. It was won by Birgit Õigemeel. The show was hosted by Jüri Nael and Aigi Vahing. The judges were Mihkel Raud, Heidy Purga and Rein Rannap.

== Auditions ==
Auditions were held in Tallinn, Tartu, Pärnu and Jõhvi in January 2007. The participation was allowed to everybody aged between 16 and 25. 2,500 people sang in auditions and only c. 100 were chosen by the judges to sing at the theatre round.

== Theatre rounds ==
The theatre round took place in Eesti Nukuteater in Tallinn. After three rounds at the theatre round 32 young singers advanced to the semi-finals.

== Semi-finals ==
The semifinals took place in April 2007. Four semifinals, plus a 'second chance' semi-final were held in TV3 studios. Eight singers who did not made it to the final were chosen by the judges to the second chance round. With a huge margin Luisa Värk won the televoting and qualified for the final. Others were eliminated.

Date	First	Second
March 16	Birgit Õigemeel	Mariann Saar
March 23	Rivo Kingi	Anna-Liisa Supp
April 1	Taavi Peterson	Mihkel Ratt
April 8	Nele Kirsipuu	Raimondo Laikre
April 15 (Wildcard)	Luisa Värk	

== Finals ==
Eight shows, plus eight Eesti otsib superstaari: Lava taga (Backstage) shows were aired during the finals.

=== Finalists ===
(Ages stated at time of contest)

Contestant	Age	Hometown	Voted off	Liveshow theme
Birgit Õigemeel	18	Kohila	Winner	Grand Finale
Luisa Värk	20	Elva	10 June 2007	Grand Finale
Taavi Peterson	19	Tartu	3 June 2007	Rock Songs & Duets
Rivo Kingi	20	Pärnu	27 May 2007	Country Songs & Billboard Hits 2007
Raimondo Laikre	24	Tallinn	20 May 2007	Big Band
Anna-Liisa Supp	20	Tartu	13 May 2007	Judge's Choice
Nele Kirsipuu	16	Tallinn	6 May 2007	Estonian Variety Show Music
Mariann Saar	18	Tallinn	29 April 2007	Film Hits
Mihkel Ratt	20	Tallinn	22 April 2007	Songs for a Special Person

=== Top 9: Song for a special person ===
- Rivo Kingi – "Fairytale Gone Bad" by Sunrise Avenue
- Nele Kirsipuu – "I'm Outta Love" by Anastacia
- Raimondo Laikre – "Back On The Road" by Earth, Wind & Fire
- Taavi Peterson – "Inimese loom" by Urmas Alender
- Mihkel Ratt – "Devils Daughter" by Silvertide
- Mariann Saar – "The Show Must Go On" by Queen
- Anna-Liisa Supp – "I Say A Little Prayer" by Aretha Franklin
- Luisa Värk – "You're the Inspiration" by Chicago
- Birgit Õigemeel – "Keegi tulla võib" by Rein Rannap

The bottom three: Mariann Saar, Rivo Kingi, Mihkel Ratt
The bottom two: Rivo Kingi, Mihkel Ratt
Eliminated: Mihkel Ratt

=== Top 8: Film music ===
- Rivo Kingi – "Hero" by Chad Kroeger featuring Josey Scott from a film "Superman"
- Nele Kirsipuu – "I Don't Wanna Miss A Thing" by Aerosmith from a film "Armageddon"
- Raimondo Laikre – "Can You Feel The Love Tonight" by Elton John from a film "Lion King"
- Taavi Peterson – "Love Me Two Times" by The Doors from a film "The Doors"
- Mariann Saar – "Respect" by Aretha Franklin from a film "Forrest Gump"
- Anna-Liisa Supp – "Listen" by Beyoncé from a film "Dreamgirls"
- Luisa Värk – "Son of a Preacher Man" by Dusty Springfield from a film "Pulp Fiction"
- Birgit Õigemeel – "Can't Fight the Moonlight" by LeAnn Rimes from a film "Coyote Ugly"

The bottom three: Nele Kirsipuu, Mariann Saar, Rivo Kingi
The bottom two: Nele Kirsipuu, Mariann Saar
Eliminated: Mariann Saar

=== Top 7: Estonian variety show music ===
- Rivo Kingi – "Julge laul" by Ivo Linna
- Nele Kirsipuu – "Rocca al Mare"
- Raimondo Laikre – "Mis värvi on armastus?" by Uno Loop
- Taavi Peterson – "Ilus oled isamaa" by Tõnis Mägi
- Anna-Liisa Supp – "Minu südames sa elad" by Jaak Joala
- Luisa Värk – "Naerjad vihmas" by Mait Maltis
- Birgit Õigemeel – "Kui mind kutsud sa" by Jaak Joala

The bottom two: Taavi Peterson, Nele Kirsipuu
Eliminated: Nele Kirsipuu

=== Top 6: Judges choice ===
- Rivo Kingi – "Nothing Else Matters" by Metallica
- Raimondo Laikre – "Big Yellow Taxi" by Counting Crows
- Taavi Peterson – "Burning Down the House" by Talking Heads
- Anna-Liisa Supp – "Walking on Broken Glass" by Annie Lennox
- Luisa Värk – "Erase/Rewind" by Cardigans
- Birgit Õigemeel – "Everybody Hurts" by R.E.M.

The bottom two: Raimondo Laikre, Anna-Liisa Supp
Eliminated: Anna-Liisa Supp

=== Top 5: Big Band round ===
- Rivo Kingi – "Sway" by Dean Martin
- Raimondo Laikre – "Ain't Misbehavin'" by Hank Williams, Jr.
- Taavi Peterson – "Route 66" composed by Bobby Troup
- Luisa Värk – "Don't Know Why" by Norah Jones
- Birgit Õigemeel – "Fever" by Little Willie John

The bottom two: Raimondo Laikre, Rivo Kingi
Eliminated: Raimondo Laikre

=== Top 4: Country song & Billboard Hit 2007 ===
- Rivo Kingi – "View from the Heaven" by Yellowcard
- Taavi Peterson – "Blowin' in the Wind" by Bob Dylan
- Luisa Värk – "I Will Remember You" by Sarah McLachlan
- Birgit Õigemeel – "Olen loobuda sust proovinud (Tryin' to Get Over You)" by Vince Gill
- Rivo Kingi – "Keep Your Hands Off My Girl" by Good Charlotte
- Taavi Peterson – "Ruby" by Kaiser Chiefs
- Luisa Värk – "All Good Things (Come to an End)" by Nelly Furtado
- Birgit Õigemeel – "Who Knew" by Pink

The bottom two: Rivo Kingi, Taavi Peterson
Eliminated: Rivo Kingi

=== Top 3:Rock song & Duet ===
- Taavi Peterson – "Polly" by Nirvana
- Luisa Värk – "Ironic" by Alanis Morissette
- Birgit Õigemeel – "Bring Me to Life" by Evanescence and Paul McCoy
- Taavi Peterson with Ines – "Iseendale" by Ines
- Luisa Värk with Tanel Padar – "Lootusetus" by Tanel Padar & The Sun
- Birgit Õigemeel with Riho Sibul – "Ma sind ei tea (All by Myself)" by Eric Carmen

Eliminated: Taavi Peterson

=== Superfinale: The Contestant's Favourite / People's Choice / Rein Rannap's Song ===
- Luisa Värk – "A Moment Like This" by Kelly Clarkson
- Birgit Õigemeel – "Bring Me to Life" by Evanescence and Paul McCoy
- Luisa Värk – "Earth Song" by Michael Jackson
- Birgit Õigemeel – "Impossible Dream" by Luther Vandross
- Luisa Värk – "Suudlus läbi jäätunud klaasi" by Rein Rannap
- Birgit Õigemeel – "Raagus sõnad" by Rein Rannap

Winner: Birgit Õigemeel

Runner-up: Luisa Värk

== Elimination chart ==
Legend
Did Not Perform	Female	Male	Top 32	Top 9	Winner

Safe	Safe First	Safe Last	Eliminated	Wild Card	Did Not Perform

Stage:		Semi				Wild; Card	Finals							
Week:		03/16	03/23	04/01	04/08	04/15	04/22	04/29	05/06	05/13	05/20	05/27	06/03	06/10
Place	Contestant	Result												
1	Birgit Õigemeel	1st												Winner
2	Luisa Värk	Elim				Saved								Runner-Up
3	Taavi Peterson			1st					Btm 2			Btm 2	Elim	
4	Rivo Kingi		34.4%				Btm 2	Btm 3			Btm 2	Elim		
5	Raimondo Laikre				2nd					Btm 2	Elim			
6	Anna-Liisa Supp		22.1%							Elim				
7	Nele Kirsipuu				1st			Btm 2	Elim					
8	Mariann Saar	2nd					Btm 3	Elim						
9	Mihkel Ratt			2nd			Elim							
Wild; Card	Elisabeth Põldma	Elim				Elim								
Wild; Card	Julia Kuusmets	Elim				Elim								
Wild; Card	Kadri Kasak		Elim			Elim								
Wild; Card	Kethi Uibomägi		11.9%			Elim								
Wild; Card	Kristiina-Sandra Saumann		17.6%			Elim								
Wild; Card	Marilin Kongo	Elim				Elim								
Wild; Card	Verina Edwards				Elim	Elim								
Semi- Final 4	Johanna Ratt				Elim									
Semi- Final 4	Mai Leemet				Elim									
Semi- Final 4	Margit Noormets				Elim									
Semi- Final 4	Mari-Ann Lett				Elim									
Semi- Final 4	Yekaterina Nikolayeva				Elim									
Semi- Final 3	Fredi Kaasik			Elim										
Semi- Final 3	Fred Rõigas			Elim										
Semi- Final 3	Jaan Krivel			Elim										
Semi- Final 3	Kustav Rossar			Elim										
Semi- Final 3	Siim Kumari			Elim										
Semi- Final 3	Taivo Sõts			Elim										
Semi- Final 2	Getter Raidam		4.0%											
Semi- Final 2	Anna Dõtõna		Elim											
Semi- Final 2	Chätrin Tolga		Elim											
Semi- Final 1	Anna Sergejeva	Elim												
Semi- Final 1	Jaanika Vilipo	Elim												

== After the season ==
The winner of the first season of Eesti otsib superstaari, Birgit Õigemeel, gave out her first single on November 12, 2007. The single was titled "Kas tead, mida tähendab…" (Do you know, what it means…). The single reached second place in Radio 2 Year's Hit Awards. Her second single "365 Days" was released in January 2008. With this song Birgit competed in Estonian Eurovision Song Contest national final – Eurolaul and reached third. On January 25, 2008, her self-titled debut album was released by MTH Publishing. Her album reached the top of Estonian album charts for many weeks. Birgit also made a contract with charity fond Dharma. Birgit gives the charity fond 10 kroons for every sold copy of her album. From her debut album four singles were released. In Autumn 2008 Birgit took part of another TV3 reality show "Laulud tähtedega" (Songs with the Stars). Birgit and her 'star-singer', politician Margus Tsahkna, were the runner-up's.

The runner-up, Luisa Värk, also took part of the Eurovision Song Contest Estonian national final – Eurolaul 2008. With Margus Vaher she sand a song "God Inside Your Soul", which placed fifth. And with band traFFic she sang a song "It's Never Too Late" and placed 8th. She released her debut album on December 4, 2008. The album was named "Tunnete allee" (Avenue of Feelings).

Taavi Peterson, who reached the third place, went on a tour with one of the judges – Rein Rannap. As the winner and the runner-up, Taavi competed in Eurolaul 2008, with a song composed by Rein Rannap.

Preceded by N/A	Eesti otsib superstaari Season 1 (2007)	Succeeded by Season 2 (2008)
