= Olav Osolin =

Estonian journalist, advertisement figure, radio and television personality, and actor

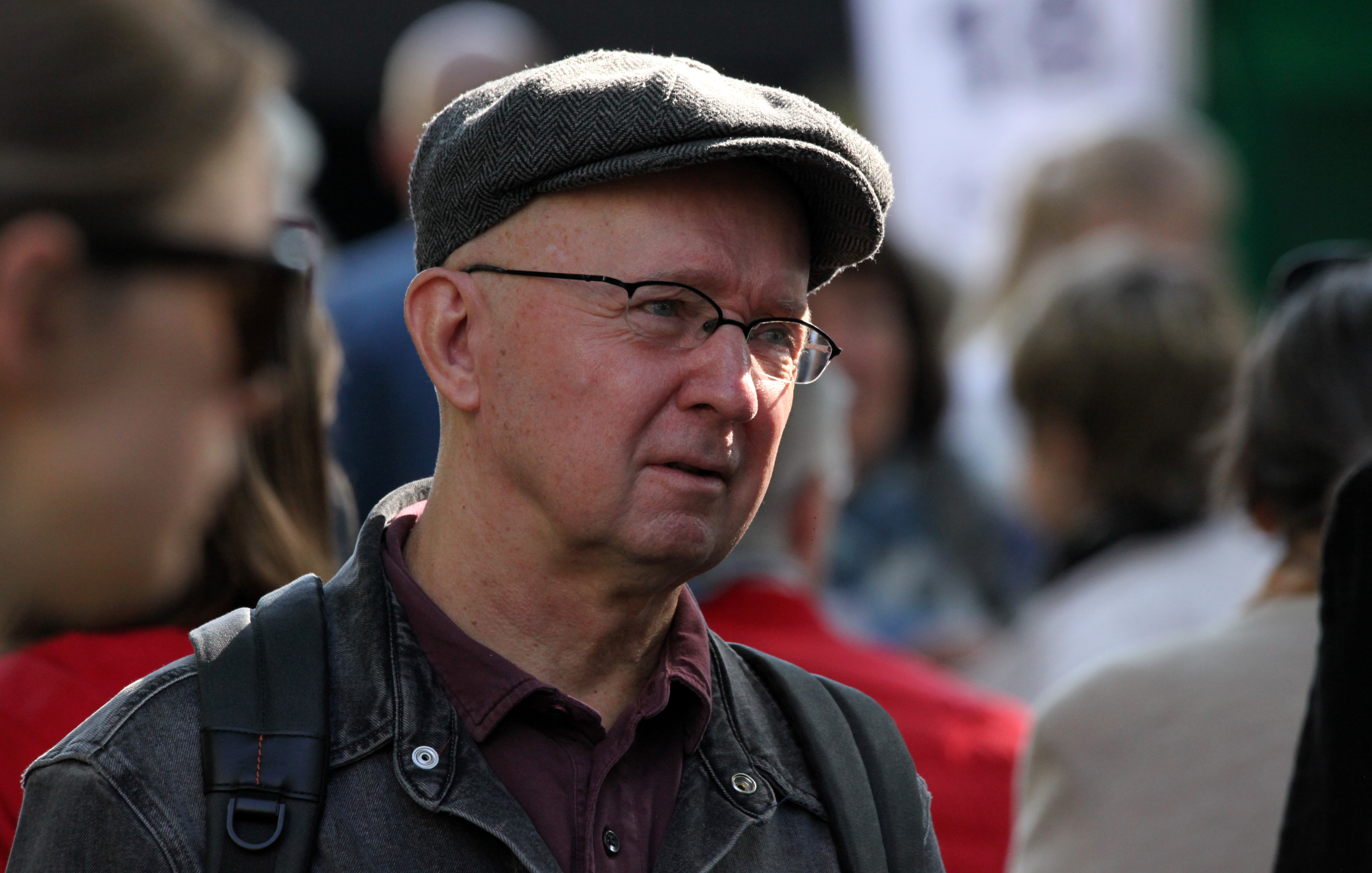
Olav Osolin at the annual Literary Street festival 2021 in Tallinn, Estonia

Olav Osolin (born 13 November 1953) is an Estonian journalist, advertisement figure, radio and television personality and actor.

Olav Osolin was born in Tallinn. In 1977 he graduated from Tartu State University in Estonian philology. 1977-1981 he worked as a journalist at Eesti Raadio. Since 1981 he has worked mainly in advertisement industry. 1982-1988 he worked at Eesti Reklaamfilm, and 1988–1991 in video company ERF Video SP. 2007-2011 he was one of the owners and the leader of advertisement agency Zavod BBDO.

He has also produced and appeared as an actor in several films and television series, including the 1963 Igor Yeltsov directed feature film drama Ühe katuse all as the character Priit Arro, as Olari "Mörr" Ernesaks in the 2011 Andres Maimik and Rain Tolk directed comedy film Kormoranid ehk Nahkpükse ei pesta, and a recurring role in the TV3 mystery-drama series Merivälja in 2017. Since 2013, he has been a judge on the TV3 celebrity talent competition series Su nägu kõlab tuttavalt.

In 2018 he was awarded with Order of the White Star, IV class.

== Filmography ==
- 1963 Ühe katuse all (feature film; role: Priit Arro)
- 1988 Lahkudes kustuta valgus (advertisement film; producer)
- 1989 Balti tee (documentary film; producer, scenarist)
- 1992 Hotell E (animated film; producer)
- 2011 Kormoranid ehk nahkpükse ei pesta (feature film; role: Olari "Mörr" Ernesaks)
- 2018 Klassikokkutulek 2: Pulmad ja matused (feature film; role: Hanna's father)
