= Ant Nurhan =

Turkish singer (born 1995)

Ant
- Born: Ant Nurhan; 8 December 1995 (age 30); Istanbul, Turkey
- Occupation: Singer

Ant Nurhan (born 8 December 1995), known mononymously as Ant, is a Turkish singer living in Estonia. He won the ninth edition of the Estonian talent show Eesti otsib superstaari.

== Career ==
In 2022, Nurhan performed on the Kanal 2 television show "Ma näen su häält". He also won the WAF singing school's traditional singing competition Best of WAF 2023 in the older age group. Later in 2023, he competed in the ninth edition of the Estonian talent show Eesti otsib superstaari, winning that season. In November 2024, it was announced that Ant would participate in Eesti Laul 2025 with the song "Tomorrow Never Comes". The song finished in fifth place.

== Personal life ==
Nurhan has been living in Estonia since 2018 and has improved his Estonian language skills largely through singing. He is married, his wife is Liina, and they have daughters Ada Linda and Adell, who was born during the recording of Eesti otsib superstaari.

== Discography ==
=== Singles ===
==== Charted singles ====
Title	Year	Peak chart positions	Album or EP
Title	Year	EST Air.	Album or EP
"Kui sind pole"	2024	16	Non-album single

Awards and achievements
Preceded by Alika Milova	Eesti otsib superstaari winner 2023	Succeeded by Most recent
