= Priit Pallum =

Estonian diplomat

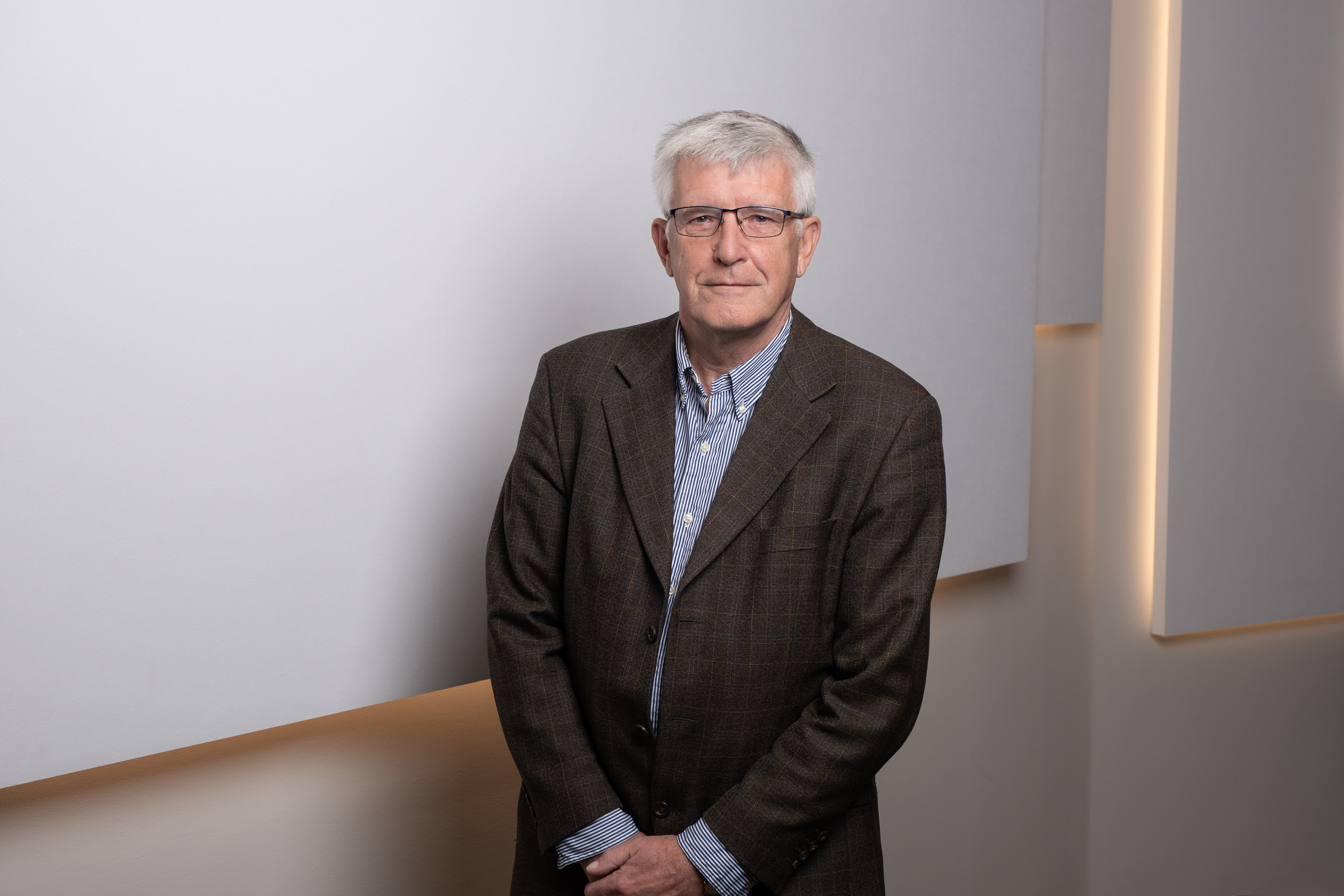
Priit Pallum

Priit Pallum (born in 1964 in Tallinn) is an Estonian diplomat.

In 1989 he graduated from Tartu State University. In 1991 he graduated from Estonian School of Diplomacy. Since 1991 he has worked for Estonian Foreign Ministry.

Diplomatic posts:

- 2002–2006 Ambassador of Estonia to Netherlands
- 2010–2014 Ambassador of Estonia to Hungary, Croatia and Slovenia
- 2018–2021 Ambassador of Estonia to Greece, Albania and Cyprus
- since 2021 Ambassador of Estonia to OECD and UNESCO

In 2001 he was awarded with Order of the National Coat of Arms, V class.
