= Karl-Erik Taukar =

Estonian singer

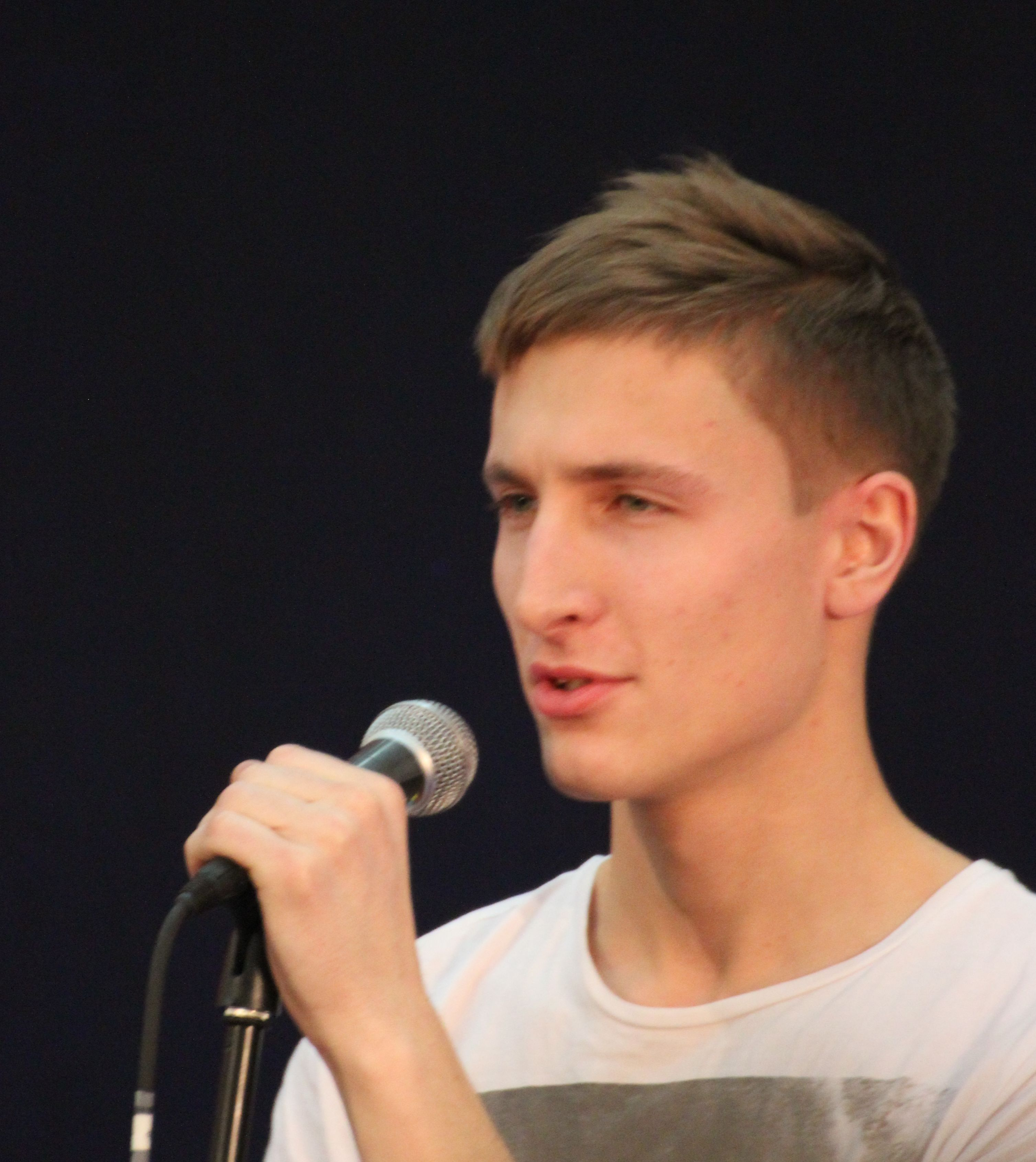
Karl-Erik Taukar in 2012

Karl-Erik Taukar (born 1 March 1989) is an Estonian singer, bass guitarist and television host.

== Career ==
Taukar was born in Viljandi. In 2012, he was a finalist on the TV3 reality-competition television series Eesti otsib superstaari, the Estonian version of Pop Idol. In 2013, the gala Raadio 2 Aastahitt awarded him as Aasta uus tulija ('newcomer of the year'). His first single "Seitsme tuule poole" achieved second place in the chart "Aastahitt 2013".

In 2015, Taukar won the Best Male Artist of the Year at the 2014 Estonian Music Awards. In 2017, Taukar won three awards: Best Album (Kaks), Best Pop Album (Kaks) and Best Male Artist at the 2017 Estonian Music Awards.

In 2015, Taukar returned to Eesti otsib superstaari during the series' sixth season as the series host. He has hosted the series since. In 2019, he cohosted the final of Eesti Laul 2019 with actress Piret Krumm and in 2020, the semi-finals of Eesti Laul 2020 with actor Tõnis Niinemets.

Taukar, guitarist Mark Eric Kammiste, keyboardist Tomi Rahula, and drummer Hans Kurvits comprise the Karl-Erik Taukar Band.

== Discography ==
albums

- 2014 – Vääramatu jõud
- 2016 – Kaks

singles

- 2013 – "Seitsme tuule poole"
- 2014 – "Vastupandamatu"
- 2014 – "Kell kuus"
- 2015 – "Segased lood"
- 2015 – "Kõik kordub"
- 2016 – "Rännata võib" (with Tanel Padar and Ott Lepland)
- 2016 – "Tähti täis on öö"
- 2016 – "Lähedal"
- 2017 – "Ei"
- 2017 – "Seitse pühapäeva"
- 2018 – "Need read"
- 2018 – "Salaja"
- 2019 – "Loomulik sarm" (with Ivo Linna and Supernova)
- 2020 – "Kuule"
- 2020 – "HUA"
- 2021 – "Superkangekaelne"
- 2021 – "Ookean"
