= Uudo Sepp =

Estonian singer

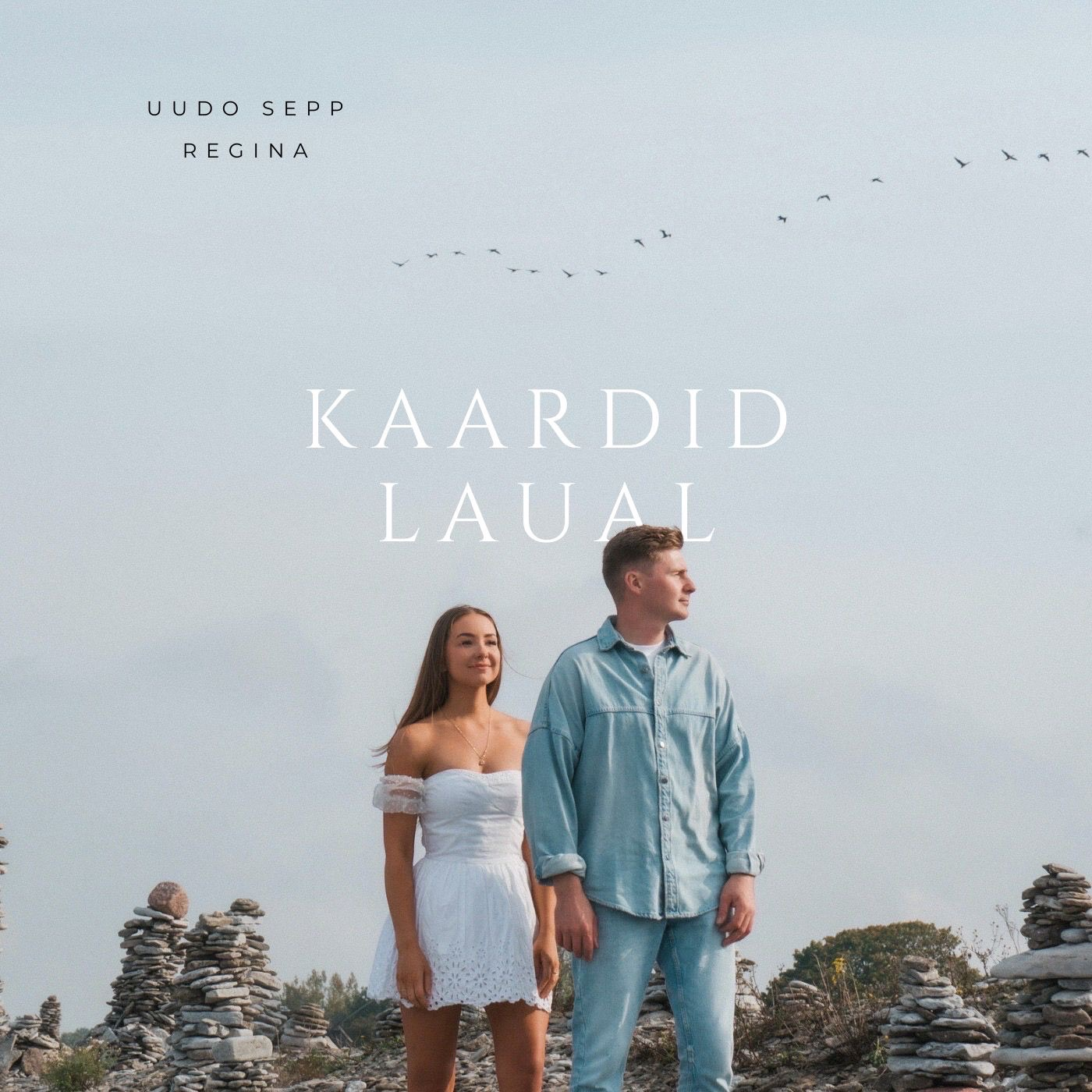
Uudo Sepp & Regina - Kaardid Laual

Uudo Sepp (born 28 March 1997 in Kuressaare) is an Estonian singer.

In 2018, he won first place in the television program Eesti otsib superstaari. In 2020, he competed in Eesti Laul, the annual music competition organised by Estonian public broadcaster Eesti Rahvusringhääling (ERR) to determine the country's representative for the Eurovision Song Contest. He achieved 10th place.

In 2024, Sepp returned to Eesti Laul, performing the duet "Still Love" with Irish-Norwegian singer Sarah Murray. The song qualified directly to the final, where it placed 8th overall, receiving 6 points—1 from the jury and 5 from the televote.

== Discography ==
Albums

- Sinule (2018)

Singles

- "Võitmatu" (2018)
- "Tahan elada" (2018)
- "I'm Sorry. I Messed Up" (2020)
- "Still Love" (with Sarah Murray) (2023)
