= Hotel E =

1992 animated film directed by Priit Pärn

- Estonian: Hotell E
- Directed by: Priit Pärn
- Produced by: Olav Osolin
- Production company: Tallinnfilm
- Release date: 1992
- Running time: 30 minutes
- Country: Estonia
- Language: Estonian

Hotel E (Estonian: Hotell E) is a 1992 Estonian animated film directed by Priit Pärn.

== Plot ==
The cartoon begins with two brief pantomime introductions to Estonian folktales. One for "The Legend of the Traitor" and another of "The Legend of the Redeemer", which are both done in separate art styles from the movie at large. The rest of the cartoon is similarly laconic and there almost no lines.

At the start, there is a glimpse of "American Dream", a cartoon within a cartoon reminiscent of Looney Tunes. It plays in the background of a brightly colored and wealthy world, intended to represent Western Europe. Its inhabitants are rotoscoped people with flashy outfits and expensive hobbies. Classical music plays in the background and people are at ease. It soon contrasts to a black-and-white realm of darkness, littered with flies. Its inhabitants are poor, dirty, and often do dangerous things. They sit around a table and lift up a teacup whenever an arrow on a table comes to their spot. Dissonant music abounds and everyone is drawn in a crude, yet indistinct fashion. This is a representation of the fallen Eastern Europe of the time. Soon, inhabitants of the dark room attempt to reach the colorful realm one by one. While the colorful realm inhabitants are receptive even when bad things happen to them, it never completely works for the dark realm inhabitants. Towards the end of the cartoon, "Hotel E" is revealed to be short for "Hotel Europe".

== Cast ==
The cast is rotoscoped motion capture, with some very brief moments of English spoken. No names are conveyed to the viewer.

- Gita Ränk as Alice
- Arne Sirel as Ben
- Timo Viljakainen as Donald
- Egon Nuter as George
- Kaie Mihkelson as Jane
- Osmo Miettinen as John
- Ulna Nõmm as Julia
- Maria Avdjuško as Mary
- Aivar Kuusk as Robert

== Accolades ==
Awards:

- 1992: Trickfilm - Stuttgart Festival of Animated Film (Germany), Baden-Württemberg award
- 2004 Melbourne International Animation Festival (Australia), participation
- 2014: Cinema Jove - Valencia International Film Festival (Spain), Luna de Valencia Award: Priit Pärn
