= Swamped (song) =

2004 single by Lacuna Coil

Single by Lacuna Coil

from the album Comalies
- Released: July 2004
- Recorded: 2002
- Genre: Gothic metal, alternative metal
- Length: 4:00 (Album Version); 3:49 (Radio Edit)
- Label: Century Media
- Songwriter(s): Lacuna Coil (Marco Biazzi, Andrea Ferro, Cristiano Mozzati, Cristina Scabbia)
- Producer(s): Waldemar Sorychta

Lacuna Coil singles chronology
| "Heaven's a Lie" (2002) | "Swamped" (2004) | "Our Truth" (2006) |

"Swamped" is a song by the Italian gothic metal band Lacuna Coil. It was released as the second and final single from their third studio album Comalies. The song features a male and female vocal track, guitar-playing and orchestral string backing. The song is featured in the video game Vampire: The Masquerade - Bloodlines, and the movie Resident Evil: Apocalypse as part of the soundtrack. "Swamped" is available as a downloadable song for Rock Band. A music video was produced for the song.

== Track listing ==
1. Swamped (Album Version) - 3:46
2. Swamped (Acoustic) - 3:40

== Music video ==
The music video for Swamped was released in June, 2004 and was shot between Sweden and Spain by Patric Ullaeus. It features the band performing in a desert (without male vocalist Andrea Ferro). Cristina Scabbia wears a black mini dress with long red and black ribbons wrapped around her hands. Then Andrea Ferro sings his part in a big mansion with large windows. In the last scene, the band walks out of the mansion into a garden.

== Cover ==
- Jana Kask (feat. Cram) covered "Swamped" during the second season of Estonian pop idol talent show.

== Charts ==
| Chart (2004) | Peak position |
|---|---|
| Austria (Ö3 Austria Top 40) | 22 |
