= Comalies =

Studio album by Lacuna Coil
- Released: 29 October 2002
- Recorded: April – May 2002
- Studio: Woodhouse Studios in Hagen, Germany
- Genre: Gothic metal; alternative metal
- Length: 51:44
- Language: English; Italian
- Label: Century Media
- Producer: Waldemar Sorychta

Lacuna Coil chronology
Unleashed Memories (2001)	Comalies (2002)	The EPs (2005)

Singles from Comalies
- 1. "Heaven's a Lie" Released: October 2002; 2. "Swamped" Released: July 2004

Professional ratings
Review scores
Source	Rating
AllMusic	4/5 stars
Chronicles of Chaos	8/10 stars
Rock Hard	8.5/10
Metalitalia	8/10
Metal Storm	8/10
Ultimate Guitar	9/10
Metal Reviews	90%

Comalies is the third studio album by Italian gothic metal band Lacuna Coil, released on 29 October 2002 through Century Media Records. According to lead singer Cristina Scabbia, "[During the album's recording], we had a sort of creative explosion. We were working in a coma, sort of like in a different dimension. First of all we just wanted to use the word 'coma' but there was something missing so we played with the two words coma and lies." Comalies peaked at #178 on the Billboard 200 and peaked at #9 on the Top Heatseekers and Independent Albums charts. The outline of the shape from the cover of the band's previous album Unleashed Memories (2001) is faintly visible on top of the sunflower. The album has gone on to sell over 300,000 copies in the United States as of January 2012.

The song "Swamped" is available as a downloadable track for the music video game series Rock Band, and also appeared in the 2004 video game Vampire: The Masquerade – Bloodlines.

In 2022 for the album's 20th anniversary, Lacuna Coil rerecorded Comalies in its entirety under the name Comalies XX. The album was released on October 14.

== Reception ==
Upon release, Comalies received universal acclaim from both music critics and band fans. In 2005, the album was ranked 415th in Rock Hard magazine's book The 500 Greatest Rock & Metal Albums of All Time. In 2016, it was ranked the 59th-greatest album of the 21st century by Metal Hammer.

== Track listing ==
All tracks are written by Lacuna Coil.

No.	Title	Length
1.	"Swamped"	4:00
2.	"Heaven's a Lie"	4:46
3.	"Daylight Dancer"	3:50
4.	"Humane"	4:12
5.	"Self Deception"	3:31
6.	"Aeon"	1:56
7.	"Tight Rope"	4:15
8.	"The Ghost Woman and the Hunter"	4:09
9.	"Unspoken"	3:37
10.	"Entwined"	3:59
11.	"The Prophet Said"	4:32
12.	"Angel's Punishment"	3:56
13.	"Comalies"	5:01
Total length:		51:44

German limited edition bonus track
No.	Title	Length
14.	"Lost Lullaby"	5:00

=== Multimedia section ===
1. The making of Comalies – 6:40

=== Ozzfest edition bonus disc ===
US, UK bonus disc
No.	Title	Length
1.	"Heaven's a Lie" (Radiomix and Edit)	4:54
2.	"Swamped" (Radiomix and Edit)	3:49
3.	"Heaven's a Lie" (Studio Acoustic Version)	4:12
4.	"Swamped" (Studio Acoustic Version)	3:40
5.	"Unspoken" (Studio Acoustic Version)	3:39
6.	"Senzafine" (Studio Acoustic Version)	3:31
7.	"Heaven's a Lie" (Live Radio WAAF Acoustic)	4:01
8.	"Senzafine" (Live Radio WAAF Acoustic)	3:15
9.	"Aeon" (Live Radio WAAF Acoustic)	1:58

=== CD2 multimedia section ===
1. Heaven's a Lie (video)
2. Swamped (video)
3. Desktop wallpapers

== Personnel ==
- Andrea Ferro – male vocals
- Cristina Scabbia – female vocals
- Marco "Maus" Biazzi – lead guitar
- Cristiano "Pizza" Migliore – rhythm guitar
- Marco Coti Zelati – bass, keyboards
- Cristiano "Criz" Mozzati – drums, percussion

== Release history ==
Country	Date
Italy	8 October 2002
United States	29 October 2002
Germany	21 June 2004

== Chart performance ==
Chart	Peak position
Billboard 200	178
US Independent Albums	9
US Top Heatseekers	9
German Albums Chart	45
French Albums Chart	69
