= Power Hit Radio (Estonia) =

Estonian radio station

Coordinates: 59°26′5.03″N 24°51′26.69″E

Power Hit Radio is an Estonian dance music radio station owned by Mediainvest Holding AS in Estonia which belongs to Swedish media company Modern Times Group (MTG). It transmits on Tallinn 102.1 FM, Pärnu 103.9 FM, Tartu 89.7 FM, Rakvere 92.5, and Viljandi 105.4.

== History ==
Power Hit Radio started in 2000 with only Tallinn's FM frequency and playing progressive dance music by DJ-s and from vinyls. In the autumn in 2000 it became Tele 2 Power Hit Radio and the format changed a bit, evolving into DJ-s who talked between the songs and also music was changed from progressive dance music to any kind of dance music, including urban and pop, which it stayed today.

In the spring of 2003, Media: Power Hit Radio opened in Lithuania. In March 2004 it opened frequency in Pärnu 103.9 FM. December 2006 saw the introduction of Power Hit Radio on satellite Sirius 3. Tartu 89.7 FM was opened in January 2007 and in April 2007 Power Hit Radio opened on Elion's digital IPTV.

== Company ==
Modern Times Group is a Swedish media corporation which has many trademarks and companies like Viasat, TV1000, Viasat Explorer, Viasat History, TV3, 3+, TV8, ZTV, Power Hit Radio, Star FM, NRJ FM (only Swedish) and Rix FM in Sweden, Norway, Denmark, Finland, Estonia, Latvia, Lithuania, Hungary, Russia, Ukraine, Bulgaria, Poland and Romania.
