= Leo Kalmet =

Estonian theatrical director

Monument to Kalmet in Tallinn

Leo Kalmet (2 March 1900 – 16 September 1975) was an Estonian stage actor and theatre director.

Kalmet was born in Orajõe, Pärnu County. He graduated from the Tallinn Humanitarian Gymnasium for Boys in 1920 and from the Drama Studio theater school in 1924. In addition, he studied at Tartu University's Faculty of Law, Department of Commerce from 1920 until 1925 as at the singing at the Tallinn Conservatory.

He participated in the Estonian War of Independence and taught at the Tallinn Conservatory.

Kalmet died in 1975 in Tallinn. A monument to him can be found at Gonsiori in downtown Tallinn.
