= Arno Suislep =

Estonian musician (born 1980)

- Born: 6 May 1980 (age 46)
- Origin: Estonia
- Genres: Pop, pop rock, space rock, experimental music
- Occupations: Musician, singer
- Instrument: Vocals
- Years active: 2008–present

Arno Suislep (born 6 May 1980) is an Estonian musician.

== Career ==
Arno Suislep is best known from the Estonian local spin off from Pop Idol called Eesti otsib superstaari, where he got second place after Jana Kask. He got 47.1% of points in a tight competition.

He plays bass guitar in the band Melotrap.
