= Säde (1927) =

Estonian newspaper

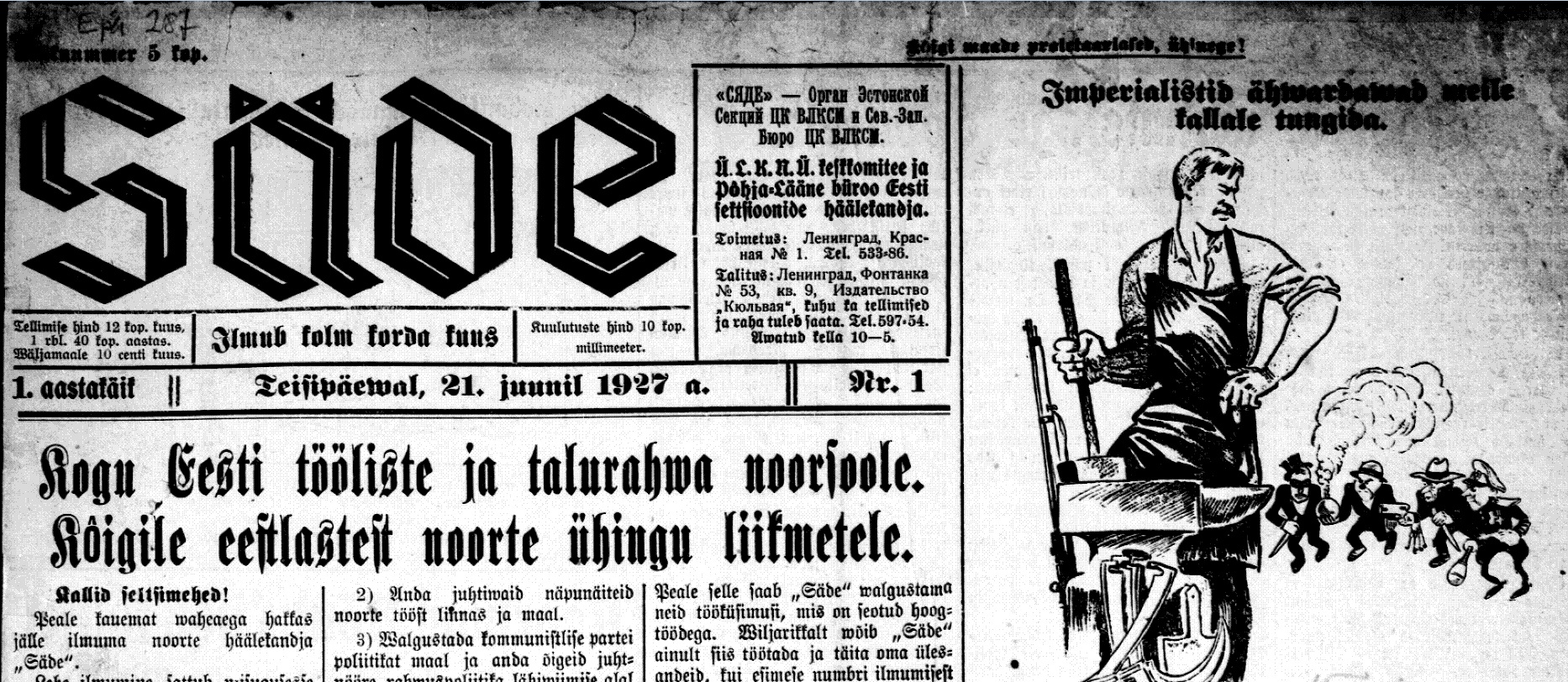
- Format: 53x43 cm
- Publisher: Külvaja
- General manager: A. Saar (1929)
- Founded: 21 June 1927
- Ceased publication: 31 December 1929
- Political alignment: Communism
- Language: Estonian language
- City: Leningrad
- Country: Soviet Union
- Circulation: 10,000 (as of 1927)

Säde ('Spark') was an Estonian language youth publication issued from Leningrad, Soviet Union from 1927 to 1929. The first issue was published on 21 June 1927. The newspaper replaced the youth magazine Säde, which had been published from 1924 to 1926.

It was the joint organ of the Estonian sections of the Central and Leningrad Oblast Committees of the All Union Leninist Young Communist League. As of 1927, Säde had a circulation of 10,000. The newspaper quickly built up a wide network of local correspondents. Ten months after its launch, it counted 148 correspondents across the Soviet Union. It played an important role in the communist youth cells in the Estonian settlements of the Black Sea coast. As of 1929 (issues 4 to 51) A. Saar was the director of the newspaper.

Säde was published by the Külvaja publishing house. A total of 105 issues of Säde were published: 19 issues were printed in 1927, 34 issues in 1928, and 51 issues in 1929. Säde was printed at the Komintern printing shop from 1927 to 1928. Issues 1–35 of 1929 were printed at the Tvorchestvo printing shop. Issues 36–37 were printed at Pechatnyy Trud, and issues 38–51 of 1929 were printed at Kirjapaja. Säde was printed in a 53 x 43 cm format, with each issue including four pages. The final issue was published on 31 December 1929.
