= Madis Kalmet =

Estonian actor and theatre director

Madis Kalmet (born 27 January 1955, in Tallinn) is an Estonian actor and theatre director.

In 1980 he graduated from the Tallinn State Conservatory's Stage Art Department. 1980-1985 he was an actor, and 1985-1988 principal stage manager of Rakvere Theatre. 1989-1992 he was an actor, and 1992-1999 the theatre director of Endla Theatre.

Besides stage roles he has also participated on several films such as Lilja 4-Ever.

Kalmet is married to diplomat and former actress Gita Kalmet (née Ränk). Their sons Henrik Kalmet and Karl-Andreas Kalmet are also actors.

Awards:

- 1988: Ants Lauter prize
- 2019: Order of the White Star, IV class.

== Selected filmography ==
- Metskapten (1971)
- Võõra nime all (1985)
- Ma pole turist, ma elan siin (1989)
- Regina (1990)
- Wikmani poisid (1995)
- Stiilipidu (2005)
