= Jaan Rannap =

Estonian author (1931–2023)

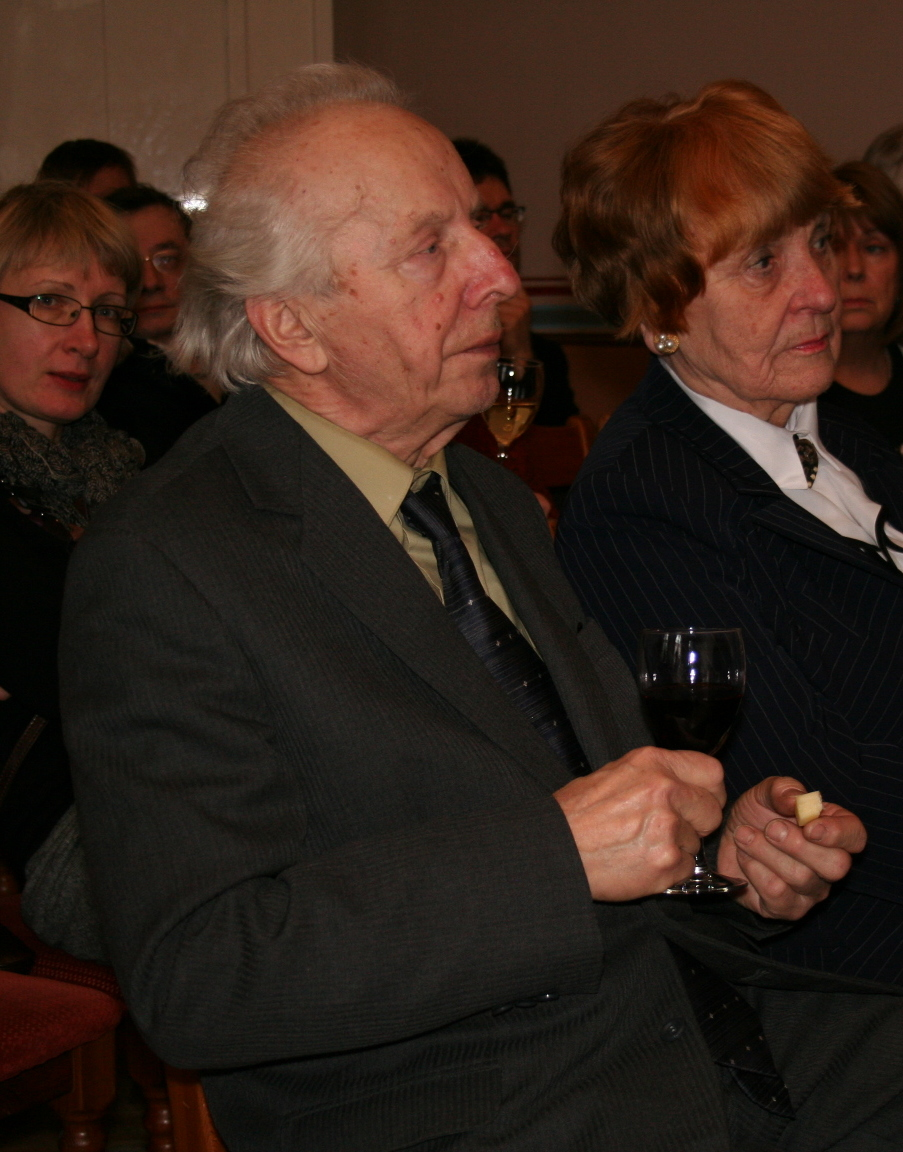
- Rannap in 2012
- Born: 3 September 1931; Halliste, Estonia
- Died: 1 November 2023 (aged 92)
- Education: Tallinn Pedagogical Institute
- Occupation: Children's writer
- Relatives: Rein Rannap (nephew)

Jaan Rannap (3 September 1931 – 1 November 2023) was an Estonian children's writer and track-and-field athlete.

== Early life and education ==
Jaan Rannap was born in Halliste on 3 September 1931. His father was a teacher Jaan Rannap, his brother is a music teacher and pedagogical scientist Heino Rannap and his nephew is musician Rein Rannap. His daughter is zoologist Riinu Rannap. In 1956 he graduated from Tallinn Pedagogical Institute with a degree in mathematics and physics.

== Career ==
From 1952 he worked at the children's magazine Säde, and 1955-1977 at the magazine Pioneer. From 1977 he was a senior editor of the children's magazine Täheke.

Rannap wrote stories about nature and animals; especially notable are his humorous school-related stories.

== Death ==
Rannap died on 1 November 2023, at the age of 92.

== Works ==
- Roheline pall (1962)
- Salu Juhan ja ta sõbrad (1964)
- Spordilood (1966)
- Viimane valgesulg (1967)
- collection Musta lamba matused (1968)
- Topi ja goonerid (1970)
- Jefreitor Jõmm (1971)
- Nublu (1972)

== Awards ==
- 2010: Order of the White Star, IV class.
