= Eesti otsib superstaari =

Estonian television series

- Created by: Simon Fuller
- Presented by: Karl-Erik Taukar (2015-2023); Henrik Kalmet (2012); Karl-Andreas Kalmet (2012); Hele Kõrve (2011); Evelin Pang (2011); Ithaka Maria (2009); Tanel Padar (2009); Ott Sepp (2008); Märt Avandi (2008); Jüri Nael (2007); Aigi Vahing (2007)
- Judges: Maarja-Liis Ilus (2009–2015); Rein Rannap (2007-2011, 2015); Tanel Padar (2015); Jarek Kasar (2015); Mihkel Raud (2007–2012, 2018-2023); Mart Sander (2012); Heidy Purga (2007–2008); Eda-Ines Etti (2018); Koit Toome (2018-2023); Birgit Sarrap (2021-2023)
- Country of origin: Estonia
- No. of seasons: 9

Production
- Producer: Kaupo Karelson
- Running time: Varies between 1/2 hour and two hours
- Production company: Fremantle

Original release
- Network: TV3
- Release: 11 March 2007 – 26 November 2023

Eesti otsib superstaari (Estonia is Searching for a Superstar) is an Estonian reality-competition gameshow airing on TV3. It debuted on 11 March 2007 and it has since become one of the most popular shows in Estonia. Based on Idol franchise, it originated from the reality program Pop Idol created by the British entertainment executive Simon Fuller, first aired in 2001 in the United Kingdom.

The program seeks to discover the best singer in Estonia through a series of nationwide auditions. The outcomes of the later stages of the competition are determined by the viewers. Through telephone and SMS text voting, viewers have chosen as winners Birgit Õigemeel, Jana Kask, Ott Lepland, Liis Lemsalu, Rasmus Rändvee, Jüri Pootsmann, Uudo Sepp, Alika Milova, and Ant Nurhan (listed in chronological order).

The format features a panel of judges who critique the contestants' performances. The judges are former recording artist, music critic and journalist Mihkel Raud (all 5 seasons), singer Maarja-Liis Ilus (since season 3) and singer, actor and conductor Mart Sander (since season 5). Composer and pianist Rein Rannap and Radio DJ, journalist and TV producer Heidy Purga belonged to the judging panel of the first season.

== Seasons ==
=== Seasons summary ===
To date, five seasons have been broadcast, as summarised below.

Season	Start	Finish	Winner	Runner-up	Hosts	Judges	Audition cities	Locations
One	11 March 2007	14 June 2007	Birgit Õigemeel	Luisa Värk	Jüri Nael; Aigi Vahing	Mihkel Raud; Heidy Purga; Rein Rannap	Tallinn; Tartu; Pärnu; Jõhvi	Live shows: ETV studio, Pärnu Concert Hall; Super-final: Pärnu Concert Hall
Two	3 February 2008	8 June 2008	Jana Kask	Arno Suislep	Ott Sepp; Märt Avandi	Mihkel Raud; Heidy Purga; Rein Rannap	Tallinn; Tartu; Pärnu; Jõhvi	Live shows: ETV studio, Concert Halls of Pärnu, Jõhvi, Vanemuine, Estonia Theatre; Super-final: Linnahall
Three	6 September 2009	20 December 2009	Ott Lepland	Birgit Varjun	Tanel Padar; Ithaka Maria	Mihkel Raud; Rein Rannap; Maarja-Liis Ilus	Tallinn, Tartu, Pärnu, Rakvere	Live shows: ETV studio Super-final: Linnahall
Four	13 February 2011	12 June 2011	Liis Lemsalu	Artjom Savitski	Evelin Pang; Hele Kõrve	Mihkel Raud; Rein Rannap; Maarja-Liis Ilus	Tallinn, Tartu, Pärnu, Jõhvi,	Live shows: ETV studio Super-final: Nokia Concert Hall
Five	9 September 2012	23 December 2012	Rasmus Rändvee	Elina Born	Henrik Kalmet; Karl-Andreas Kalmet	Mihkel Raud; Maarja-Liis Ilus; Mart Sander	Tallinn, Tartu; Narva, Viljandi	Live shows: ETV studio Super-final: Nokia Concert Hall
Six	15 February 2015	31 May 2015	Jüri Pootsmann	Gertu Pabbo	Karl-Erik Taukar	Rein Rannap; Maarja-Liis Ilus; Tanel Padar; Jarek Kasar	Tallinn, Tartu...	Live shows: ETV studio Super-final: Nokia Concert Hall
Seven	18 February 2018	4 June 2018	Uudo Sepp	Sissi Nylia Benita	Karl-Erik Taukar	Eda-Ines Etti; Mihkel Raud; Koit Toome	Tallinn, Tartu...	Live shows: ETV studio Super-final: Nokia Concert Hall
Eight	14 August 2021	12 December 2021	Alika Milova	Wanda-Helene Ollep	Karl-Erik Taukar	Birgit Sarrap; Mihkel Raud; Koit Toome	Tallinn, Tartu...	Live shows: ETV studio Super-final: Nokia Concert Hall
Nine	3 September 2023	26 November 2023	Ant Nurhan	Margareth Mürk	Karl-Erik Taukar	Birgit Sarrap; Mihkel Raud; Koit Toome	Tallinn, Tartu...	Live shows: ETV studio Super-final: Nokia Concert Hall

=== Season 1 ===
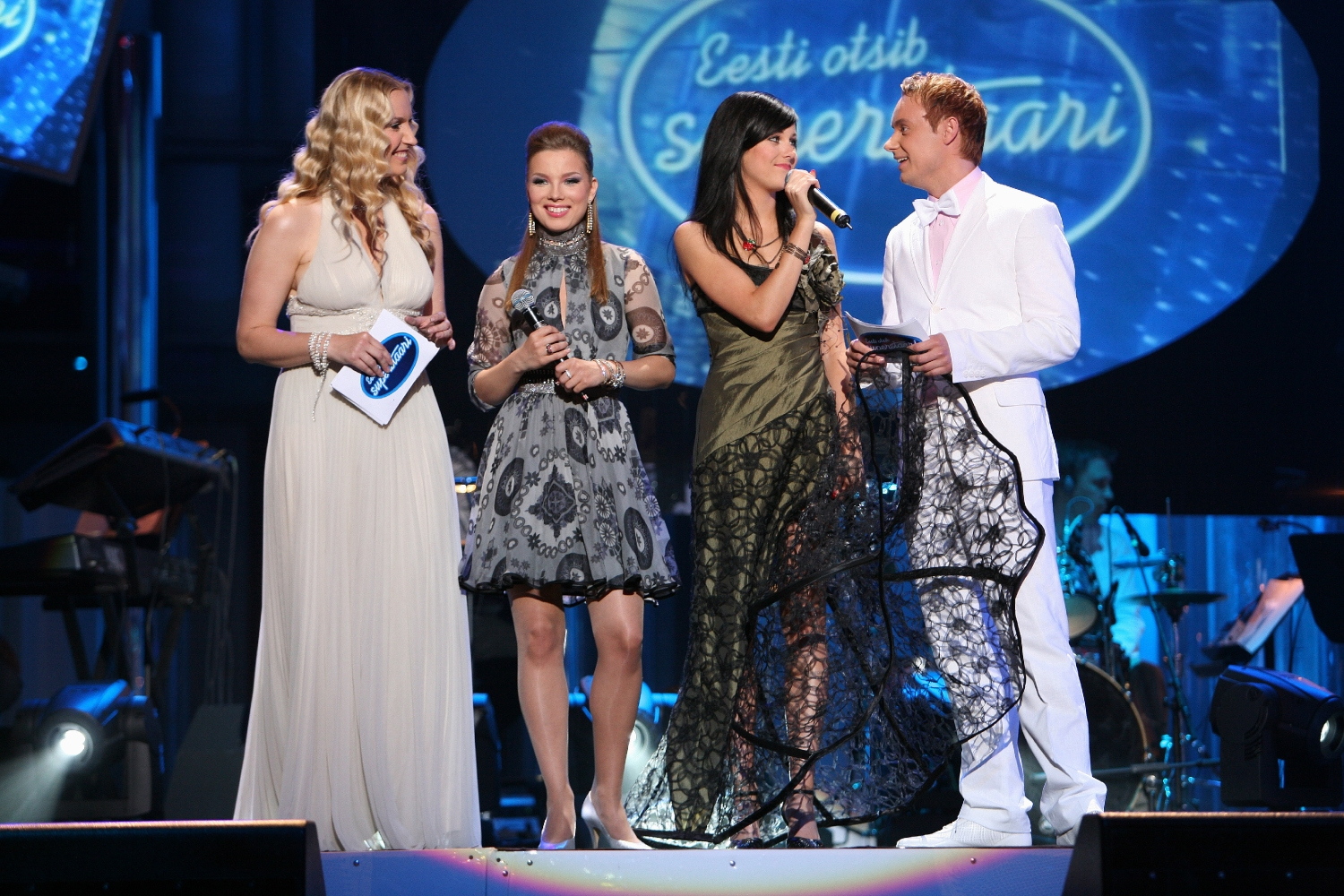
The superfinal of season one. From the left: Aigi Vahing, Luisa Värk, Birgit Õigemeel, Jüri Nael

Eesti otsib superstaari logo as of 2007–11

The first season of Eesti otsib superstaari debuted on 11 March 2007 and instantly became one of the most popular television shows in Estonia, following in the success of other Idol competitions around the world. The hosts were actress Aigi Vahing and choreographer Jüri Nael. The judging panel consisted of singer, guitar player, music critic and journalist Mihkel Raud, composer and pianist Rein Rannap and radio disc jockey and television producer Heidy Purga.

The winner of the series was Birgit Õigemeel, who won a recording contract and 100 000 kroons. She used the money dedicated for the recording contract on building her own recording company MTH Publishing. In January 2008 she released her self-titled debut album and held the number one spot for several weeks. Since winning the show, Õigemeel has released three studio albums and several singles. The runner-up, Luisa Värk also has released an album and several singles.

=== Season 2 ===
The second season of Eesti otsib superstaari debuted on 3 February 2008. Actors and comedians Ott Sepp and Märt Avandi emerged as the new presenters. The judging panel remained the same. The Finale of the series was held in the Linnahall arena to an audience of 3000 people. More than 70 000 calls and text messages were sent during the televoting.

The series was won by Jana Kask, who collected 52,9% of the votes in the Finale. Kask signed a record dea while the album was not released by the recording company because of 'riskful situation in the local music market'. In late summer, Kask started collaboration with manager Ivar Must and her debut album Face in the Mirror was finally released in December 2009.

=== Season 3 ===
The third season of Eesti otsib superstaari premiered on 6 September 2009. In autumn 2008, TV3 announced that the third season would be postponed due to the recession. The auditions for the third series started in August 2009.

The Eurovision Song Contest-winning singer and guitar player Tanel Padar and singer Ithaka Maria emerged as the new presenters of the show. There were also changes in the judging panel, Heidy Purga was replaced by singer Maarja-Liis Ilus.

The Finale of the series was held on 20 December 2009 once again in the Linnahall, Tallinn. The series was won by Ott Lepland, who won a recording contract with Crunch Industry. Ott Lepland's self-titled debut album was released on 13 April 2010. Getter Jaani, who finished fourth in the series, got also signed by Moonwalk Records and released her debut album in May 2011. She also represented Estonia in the Eurovision Song Contest 2011.

=== Season 4 ===
The fourth season of Eesti otsib superstaari premiered on 13 February 2011. The judging panel remained the same, consisting of Mihkel Raud, Rein Rannap and Maarja-Liis Ilus. Once again new presenters were introduced, they were actors and singers Hele Kõrve and Evelin Pang.

The series was won by Liis Lemsalu, who was awarded with € 10,000 and a record contract with the Universal Music Baltics. The show was followed by a tour "Eesti superstaar - Live tuur" around the country in June 2011.

=== Season 5 ===
"Eesti otsib superstaari" fifth season premiered on 9 September 2012. The hosts of the season are actors Karl-Andreas Kalmet and Mihkel Kalmet. Two of three judges from the fourth season, Mihkel Raud and Maarja-Liis Ilus, continued their job as the judges. Rein Rannap was replaced by Mart Sander.

Auditions for the fifth season took place in Narva (11 August 2012), Viljandi (18 August), Tallinn (25–26 August) and Tartu (1–2 September).

=== Season 6 ===
"Eesti otsib superstaari" sixth season premiered on 15 February 2015. The host of the season was singer Karl-Erik Taukar (Previously fourth place on the fifth season). Judges were Jarek Kasar, Tanel Padar, Maarja-Liis Ilus and Rein Rannap

The series was won by Jüri Pootsmann with Gertu Pabbo as runner-up.

==== Elimination Chart ====
		Finals								
Date:		05.04	12.04	19.04	26.04	03.05	10.05	17.05	24.05	31.05
Place	Contestants	Results								
1	Jüri Pootsmann									Winner
2	Gertu Pabbo		Bottom 3			Bottom 2	Bottom 2	Bottom 2		Runner-Up
3	Kristjan Kannukene				Bottom 3	Bottom 3			Out	
4	Mikk Mäe	Bottom 2	Bottom 2		Bottom 2			Out		
5	Karl Gustav Adamsoo	Bottom 3					Out			
6	Jana Liisa Johannson			Bottom 3		Out				
7	Karl Mihkel Salong			Bottom 2	Out					
8	Annabel Guitar			Out						
9	Risto Paiste		Out							
10	Anelle Tamm	Out								

Legend
Females	Males	Top 10	Bottom 3	Bottom 2	Eliminated	Safe	No longer in the competition

=== Season 7 ===
"Eesti otsib superstaari" seventh season premiered on 18 February 2018. The host of the season was singer Karl-Erik Taukar. Judges were Eda-Ines Etti, Mihkel Raud and Koit Toome.

The series was won by Uudo Sepp with Sissi Nylia Benita as runner-up. The other finalists were, from third to tenth : Merilin Mälk, Helis Järvepere Luik, Jaagup Tuisk, Carlos Ukareda, Jennifer Marisse Cohen, Anette Maria Rennit, Rauno Gutman and Hele Mai Mängel.

=== Season 8 ===
"Eesti otsib superstaari" eighth season premiered on 14 August 2021. The host of the season was singer Karl-Erik Taukar. Judges were Mihkel Raud, Koit Toome and also Birgit Sarrap (Winner of the first season) who replaced Eda-Ines Etti after season seven

The series was won by Alika Milova with 71.8% of the votes, and Wanda-Helene Ollep as the runner-up. The other finalists were, from third to tenth : Maribel Vääna, Märten Männiste, Andreas Pall, Ingmar Erik Kiviloo, Tiina Adamson, Marten Põldmets, Diana Maria Toomingas and Merili Käsper.
