= Riinu Rannap =

Estonian zoologist (born 1966)

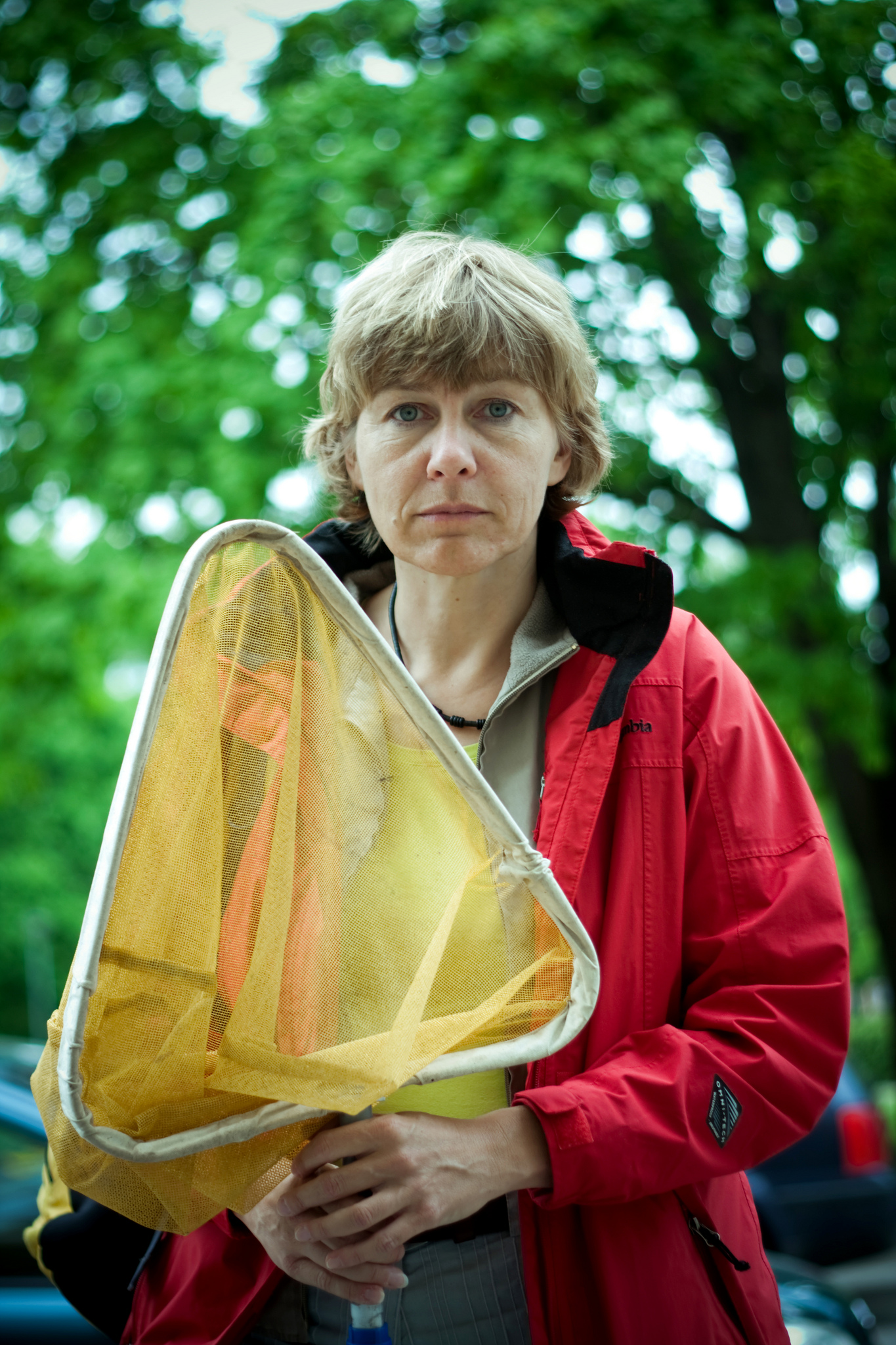
Riinu Rannap in Tartu, in front of Vanemuine 46 in 2011. Photo: Lauri Kulpsoo

Riinu Rannap (born 23 October 1966) is an Estonian zoologist who studies amphibians and whose research focuses on protecting amphibians and their wetland habitats.

== Biography ==
Her father was the writer Jaan Rannap and her cousin is the composer and pianist Rein Rannap. From 1985 to 1990, she attended the University of Tartu, Faculty of Biology and Geography, and from 2005 to 2009, she completed her doctoral studies at the Institute of Ecology and Earth Sciences at the same university.

Beginning in 1997, Rannap worked for several years at the Ministry of the Environment before joining the staff at the University of Tartu in 2008 as a specialist and then as a researcher before becoming a faculty member.

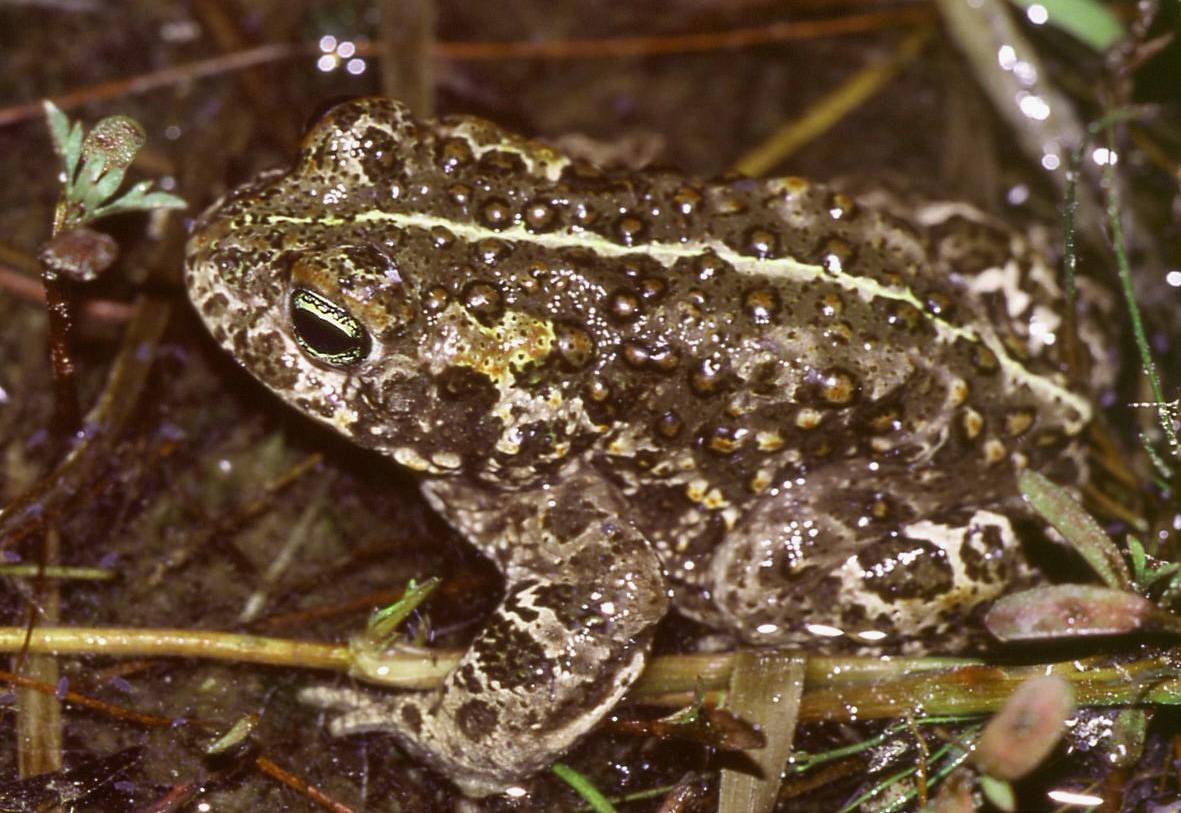
Male Natterjack Toad (Bufo calamita); at night in its breeding pool in a gravel pit.

Rannap's Master's research concerned the Natterjack Toad (Bufo calamita), an amphibian native to the sandy areas of Estonia and Europe, distinguished by a yellow line down its back, as well as a loud mating call. Her doctoral dissertation was titled: Impacts of habitat loss and restoration on amphibian populations.

Her research has shown that in Estonia during the Soviet era, land use changed with increased forest plantings, more pollution from field runoff from agriculture and unfiltered waste from urban areas spilling into waterways. The result was habitat loss, not only for the Natterjack Toad but also for meadow birds, because they lay their eggs in those areas. These animals are afraid of forests, and they need vast open wetlands; they search for food in pools and wet areas. She concluded that "by the end of the 1990s, we had just 20 populations left of the Natterjack Toad in Estonia, a species that once thrived in the coastal areas of Estonia."

At the University of Tartu, Rannap is chair of Natural Resources and Associate Professor of Wetland Ecology. She focuses her primary research on organisms associated with small water bodies – amphibians and aquatic macroinvertebrates, their habitat, their geographical variability, colonization of novel ecosystems and opportunities for habitat restoration.

== Selected honors ==
- 2017 Estonian Nature Conservation Label
- 2019 Ministry of Defense Silver Badge
- 2024 University of Tartu Medal of Honor

== Selected publications ==
- Rannap, Riinu, Asko Lõhmus, and Kaidi Jakobson. "Consequences of coastal meadow degradation: the case of the natterjack toad (Bufo calamita) in Estonia." Wetlands 27, no. 2 (2007): 390-398.
- Rannap, Riinu, Asko Lõhmus, and Lars Briggs. "Niche position, but not niche breadth, differs in two coexisting amphibians having contrasting trends in Europe." Diversity and Distributions 15, no. 4 (2009): 692-700.
- Rannap, Riinu, Tanel Kaart, Hannes Pehlak, Silja Kana, Elin Soomets, and Kaire Lanno. "Coastal meadow management for threatened waders has a strong supporting impact on meadow plants and amphibians." Journal for Nature Conservation 35 (2017): 77-91.
- Rannap, Riinu, Marta M. Kaart, Tanel Kaart, Keit Kill, Evelyn Uuemaa, Ülo Mander, and Kuno Kasak. "Constructed wetlands as potential breeding sites for amphibians in agricultural landscapes: A case study." Ecological Engineering 158 (2020): 106077.
