= Heaven's a Lie =

"Heaven's A Lie"

Single by Lacuna Coil

from the album Comalies
- Released: October 2002
- Recorded: 2002
- Genre: Gothic metal, symphonic metal
- Length: 4:46 (Album Version); 3:54 (Radio Edit)
- Label: Century Media
- Songwriter(s): Marco Biazzi, Andrea Ferro, Cristiano Mozzati, Cristina Scabbia
- Producer(s): Waldemar Sorychta

Lacuna Coil singles chronology
"Heaven's A Lie" (2002)	"Swamped" (2004)

Music video
- "Heaven's A Lie" on YouTube

Heaven's a Lie is the first single by Lacuna Coil from their album Comalies. Although frequently labeled as an anti-religion song, the song's namesake was not intended to be interpreted literally. In an interview with HighWireDaze.com, leading vocalist Cristina Scabbia explained the meaning of the song; the word "heaven" is a metaphor for a "perfect life". When the phrase "your heaven's a lie" is used, it is referring to people who try to force their opinions on others.

Co-vocalist Andrea Ferro refers to this theme at their concerts as a song about freedom of ideas.

Amidst the single's newfound popularity in late 2003, the group performed an acoustic version of "Heaven's a Lie" during an edition of Headbangers Ball. The album version was also included on the compilation album, MTV2 Headbangers Ball.

The song was used on a commercial for the TV show Criminal Minds.

== Track listing ==
1. Heaven's a Lie - 4:46
2. Self Deception - 3:30

== Music videos ==
The first version of the music video was released when the album Comalies came out. It was a sort of backstage shot during the recording of Comalies in the Woodhouse studios by Luigi Sabadini and the band themself.

The second music video accompanied the single's release in May, 2003. It found airplay on Uranium alongside one of the earliest televised American interviews with the group on said program. This video, shot in Los Angeles by Chade Seide, had a noticeably low budget and featured the group's vocalists sitting along a dark staircase.

However, upon the sudden popularity of the single in December, 2003, an entirely new music video was released and found high circulation on MTV2's resurrected Headbangers Ball. This version was directed by Patric Ullaeus and shot in Gothenburg, Sweden, with €6000 budget features noticeably vibrant graphics and a stronger presentation overall compared with its predecessor. It has the band performing in a green screened landscape with small, threatening discs cutting through the air. Lacuna Coil's follow up, "Swamped," would have a likewise high production.

== Cover ==
- Manntis (feat. In This Moment) covered "Heaven's A Lie" on Covering 20 Years Of Extremes, 2CD compilation for celebrating Century Media Records 20th anniversary.

== Sample ==
Heaven's a Lie
"Heaven's a Lie" from Comalies
