= Birgit Sarrap =

Estonian singer

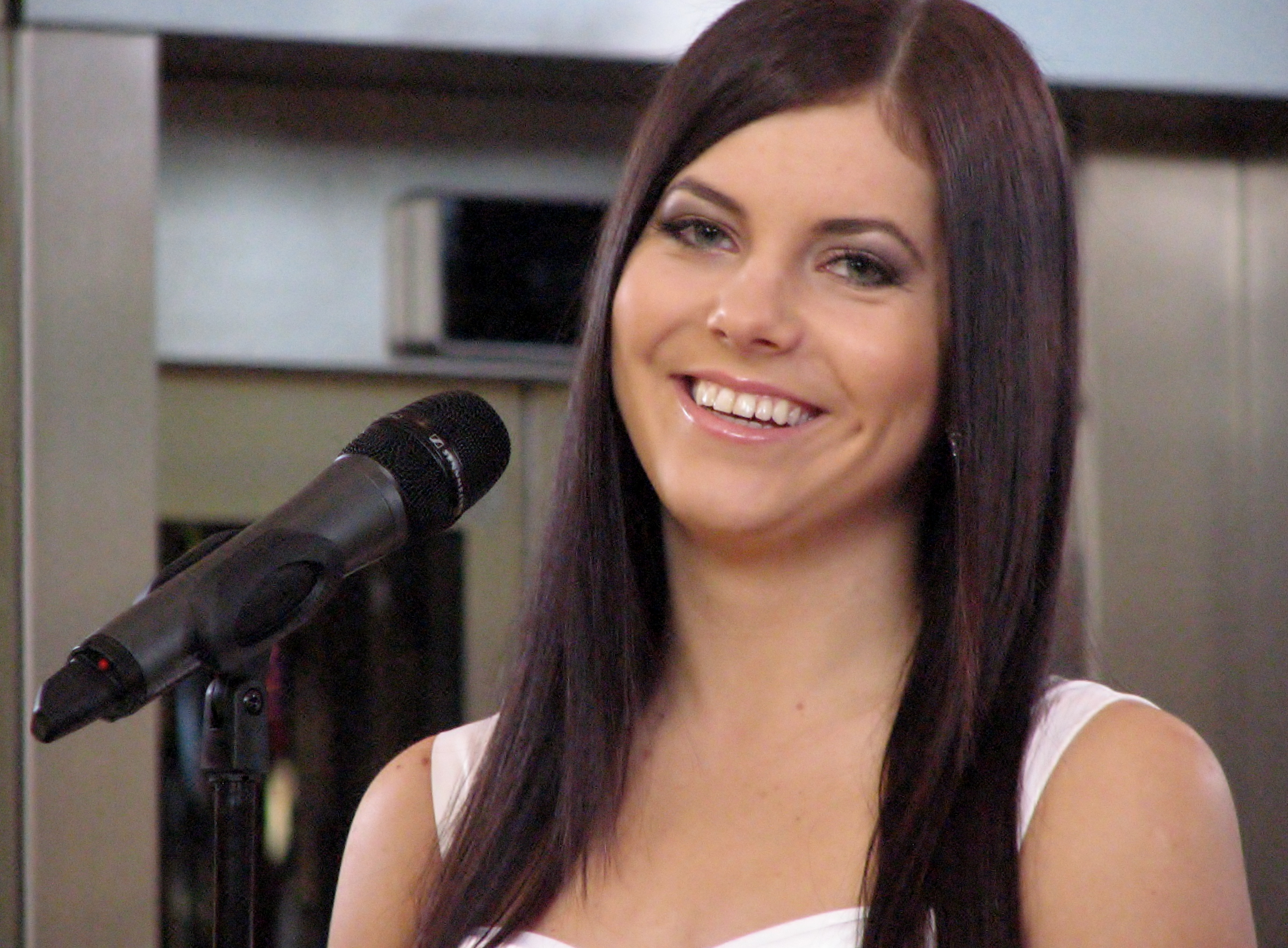
- Birgit in 2013

Background information
- Also known as: Birgit
- Born: Birgit Õigemeel; 24 September 1988 (age 37); Kohila, then part of Estonian SSR, Soviet Union
- Genres: Pop
- Years active: 2007–present
- Label: MTH Publishing / Enjoy Entertainment
- Website: www.birgit.ee

Birgit Sarrap (née Õigemeel; born 24 September 1988), also known mononymously as Birgit, is an Estonian singer. She rose to prominence in 2007 after winning the first season of Eesti otsib superstaari, the Estonian version of Idol. Her debut self-titled studio album was later released in 2008. Birgit has gone on to release four other studio albums in her career.

Birgit represented Estonia in the Eurovision Song Contest 2013 with the song "Et uus saaks alguse" after winning Eesti Laul 2013. She qualified for the grand final, where she placed 20th.

== Career ==
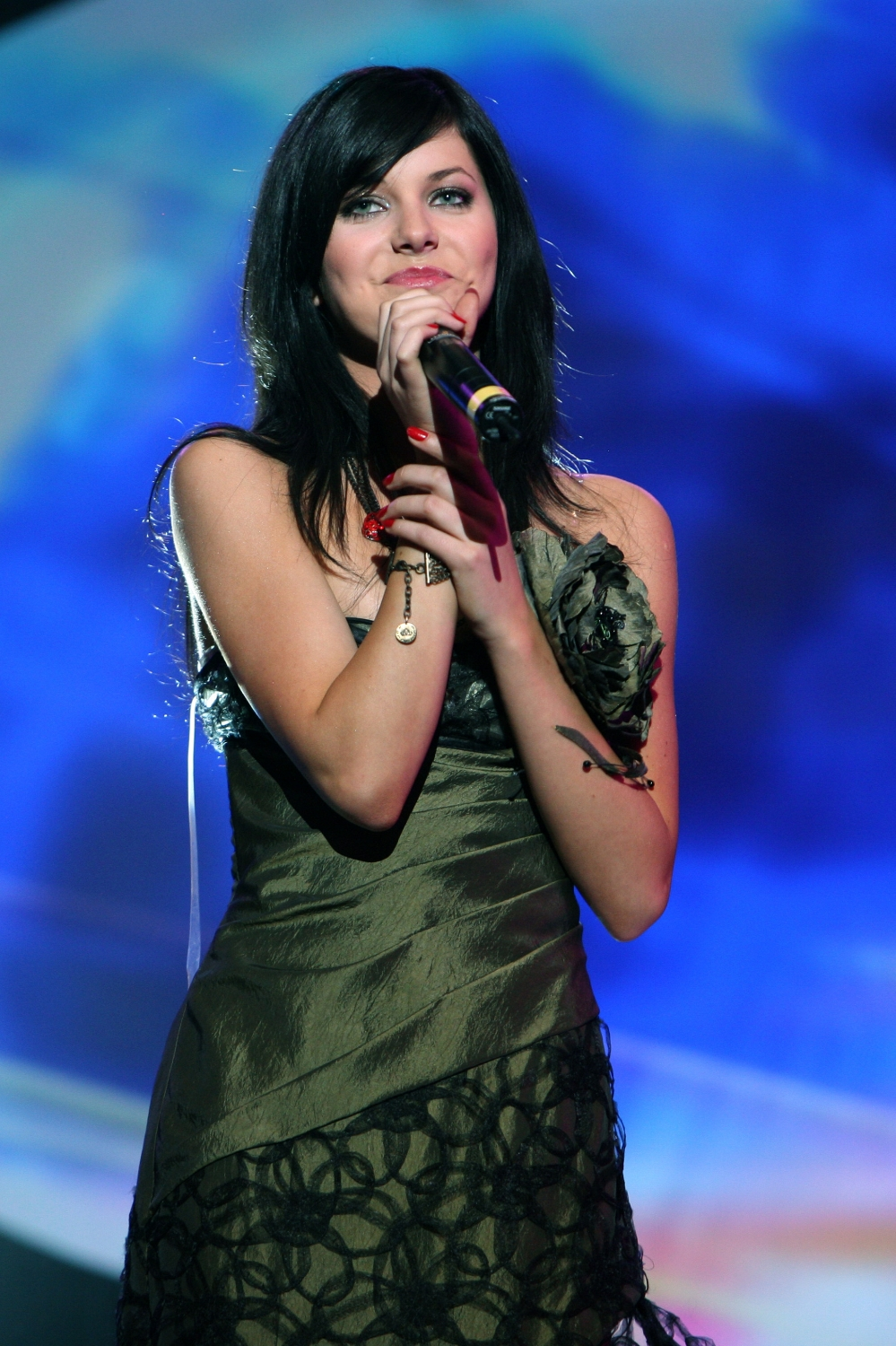
Birgit performing in 2007

She started her musical career as a choir singer on Estonian Television children's choir and learned the violin at Kohila Music School.

Birgit is the first winner of Eesti otsib superstaari, Estonia's version of Pop Idol. In 2007, at the Italian culture festival L'Olivo d'Oro (Golden Olive). Birgit was the first non-Italian to receive the Golden Olive Branch award.

=== Eurovision Song Contest ===
Birgit represented Estonia in the Eurovision Song Contest 2013 in Malmö, Sweden with the song "Et uus saaks alguse" ("So There Could Be a New Beginning"), qualifying from the first semi-final of the competition from 10th place, and placing 20th in the final, scoring 19 points.

Prior to the participation, she tried to enter the contest twice, in 2008 and 2012, but yet with no success. In 2002, when the contest was held in Tallinn, she was on stage during the interval act as a choir artist.

=== Theatre ===
Birgit has been involved with professional theatre productions: in 2007 she played the role of Sylvia in the stage play Two Gentlemen of Verona (written by William Shakespeare and directed by a well known Estonian director/actor Lembit Peterson) at the Estonian theatre Theatrum.

At the theatre Vanemuine, she has played Maria Von Trapp of The Sound of Music (opened in 2010) and appeared in supporting roles in a popular ethno musical Peko (premiered in 2011 as an open-air production in Värska). As of the autumn of 2016, she played Sophie in the Estonian production of Mamma Mia and had multiple supporting roles in a popular 2022 musical "Ada", based on life of Ada Ludver, Estonian legendary film actress and media personality. Likewise in 2024, she was cast in multiple roles in "Rohelised niidud", aga musical based on the legendary vocal group, Eesti Raadio Meeskvartett. In her spare time she has occasionally played also with an amateur company in her home town Kohila.

== Personal life ==
Birgit is married to her manager Indrek Sarrap. She gave birth to their first child, a boy, in October 2013. Their second child, a girl was born in 2016. They live in Tallinn.

Birgit's mother is a music teacher, while her father runs a local furniture company. They live in Kohila. Birgit is the second youngest of four sisters. With her sisters, she has appeared also as a singing group either on television shows or local events.

== Discography ==
=== Albums ===
- Birgit Õigemeel (2008)
- Ilus aeg (2008)
- Teineteisel pool (2009)
- Uus algus (2013)
- V (2018)

=== Singles ===
- Kas tead, mida tähendab... (13 November 2007)
- 365 Days (2008)
- Homme (2008)
- Ise (2008)
- Last Christmas (2008)
- Talve võlumaa (2008)
- Moonduja (2009)
- See öö (2009)
- Põgenen (with Koit Toome) (2010)
- Sinuga end elusana tunda võin (with Birgit Varjun) (2010)
- Iialgi (with Violina) (2010)
- Eestimaa suvi (2010)
- Parem on ees (2011)
- You're not alone (with Violina), Eesti Laul 2012, (2011)
- Et uus saaks alguse, Eesti Laul 2013 and Eurovision 2013, (2012)
- Sea of Life (with Violina) (2013)
- Nii täiuslik see (2013)
- Olen loodud rändama (2013)
- Lendame valguskiirusel (2014)
- Pea meeles head (with Ott Lepland) (2014)
- Kolm kuud (2014)
- Kingitus (2014)
- Valge saatan (with Tanja) (2015)
- Alles sügisel mõtleme (2015)
- Ma tean, et sa tead (2016)
- Leekides tee (2016)
- 15 000 sammu (2018)

Awards and achievements
Preceded by New title	Winner of Eesti otsib superstaari 2007	Succeeded by Jana Kask
Preceded by Ott Lepland with "Kuula"	Estonia in the Eurovision Song Contest; 2013	Succeeded by Tanja Mihhailova with "Amazing"
