= Estonian School of Diplomacy =

Private university in Tallinn

Coordinates: 59°25′49.01″N 24°44′22.45″E

Estonian School of Diplomacy (Estonian: Eesti Diplomaatide Kool) is a private university in Tallinn, Estonia, established in 1990 (35 years ago). It is located in the building of the National Library of Estonia.

== See also ==
- List of universities in Estonia
