= Karl-Andreas Kalmet =

Estonian actor (born 1989)

Karl-Andreas Kalmet (born 8 February 1989) is an Estonian actor.

== Early life and education ==
Kalmet's parents are actor and director Madis Kalmet and diplomat and former actress Gita Kalmet (née Ränk). In 2008, he graduated from British School in The Netherlands in The Hague and in 2012 as an actor at from the Estonian Academy of Music and Theatre's Performing Arts Department.

== Career ==
Then, until 2015, he worked as an actor at the Tallinn City Theatre. In 2012 he co-hosted for the TV3 television series Eesti otsib superstaari with his older brother, actor Henrik Kalmet.

He is an attacker in football club Tallinna FC Reaal.

== Filmography ==
- 1944 (2015)
- The Days That Confused (2016)
- The Dissidents (2017)
