= Jana Kask =

Estonian singer

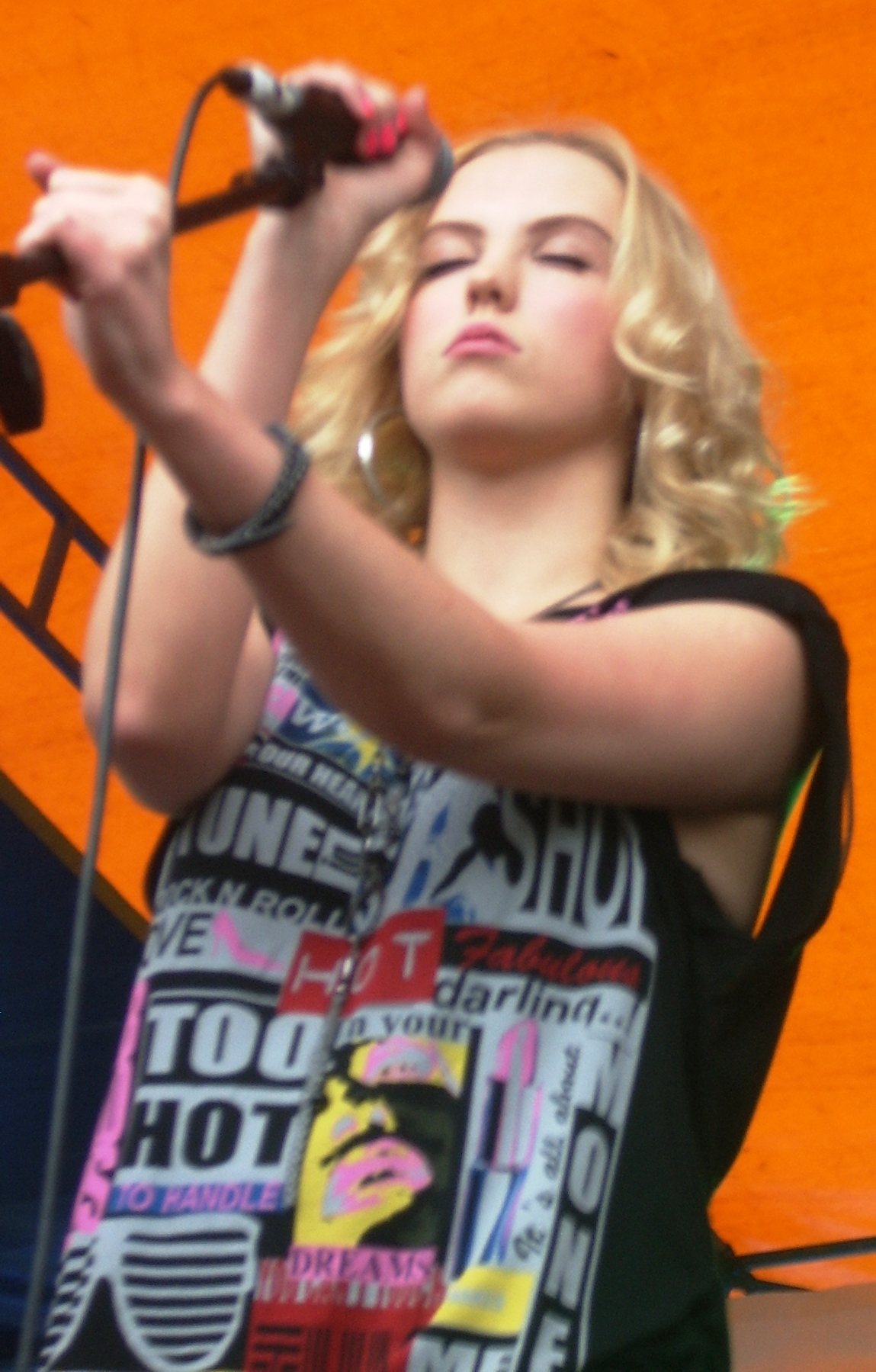

Background information
- Born: 11 November 1991 (age 34)
- Origin: Estonia
- Genres: Pop rock Hard rock
- Occupations: Musician, singer
- Instrument: Vocals
- Years active: 2008–present

Jana Kask (born 11 November 1991) is an Estonian singer and the winner of Eesti otsib superstaari 2008, the second season of the Estonian version of Pop Idol. In the final, she competed against Arno Suislep, winning it by getting 52.9% of the votes. Her first studio album was released in late 2009.

For now, she holds the record as being the youngest winner of the Idol series worldwide at the time of her triumph, which was set by Casey Donovan, winner of Season 2 of Australian Idol before. Jana's first single was Leaving You for Me.

== Discography ==
=== Albums ===
- 2009: Face in the Mirror

=== Singles ===
- 2008: Leaving You for Me
- 2009: Face in the Mirror
- 2010: Don't Want Anything
- 2011: Feel the Vibe
- 2012: Beyond Good And Evil
- 2012: Sleep My Little Angel
- 2012: Heroes
- 2013: Shooting Star

Awards and achievements
Preceded by Birgit Õigemeel	Winner of Eesti otsib superstaari 2008	Succeeded by Ott Lepland
