= Rein Rannap =

Estonian composer and pianist (born 1953)

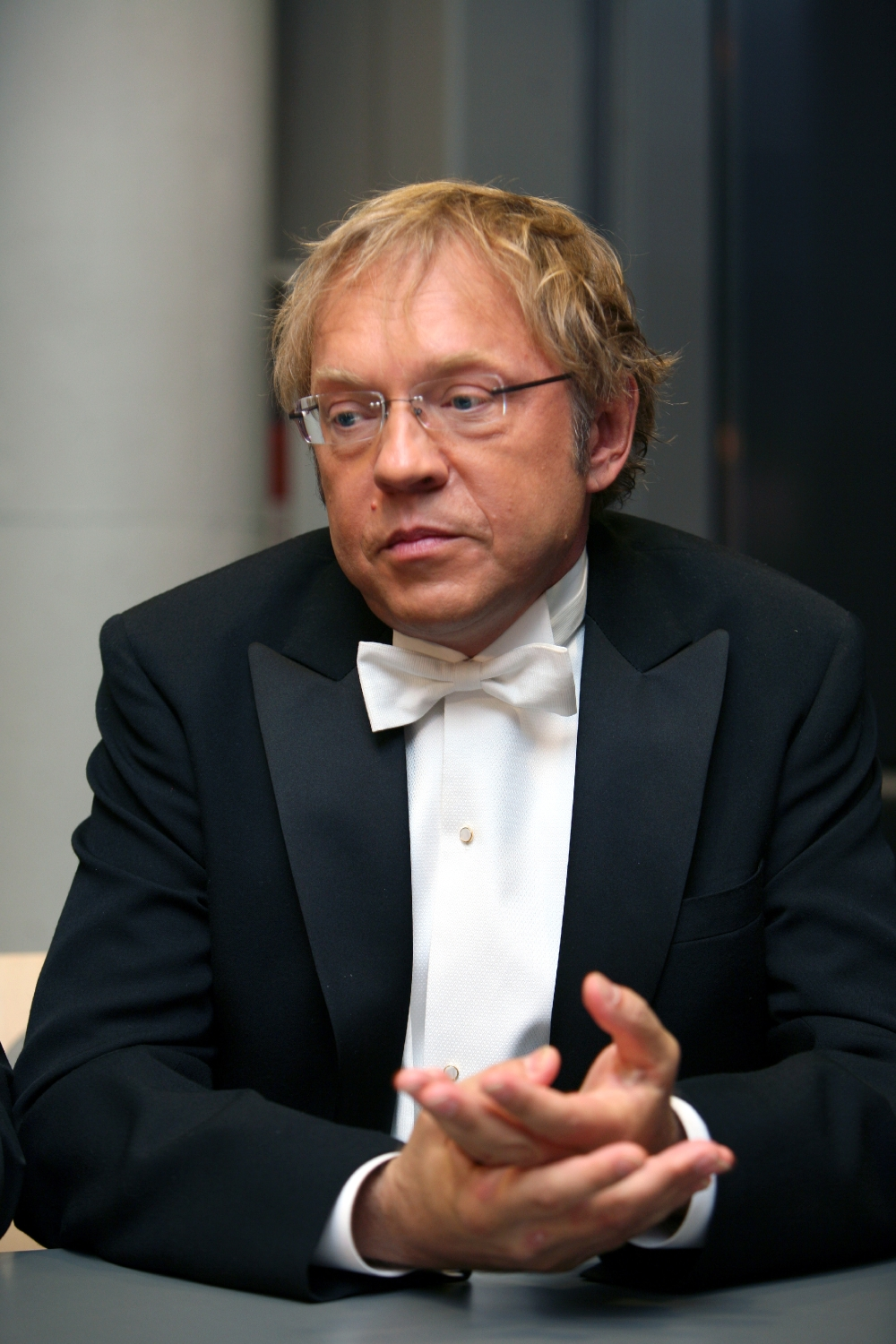
- Rannap in 2007 as a judge in Eesti otsib superstaari final
- Born: 6 October 1953 (age 72); Tallinn, then part of Estonian SSR, Soviet Union
- Occupations: Composer; pianist
- Years active: 1968–present
- Spouse: Katre Kõiva (divorced)
- Children: 3, including Ikevald Rannap
- Parent(s): Heino Rannap (father); Ines Rannap (mother)
- Relatives: Jaan Rannap (uncle); Riinu Rannap (cousin)

Rein Rannap (born 6 October 1953) is an Estonian composer and pianist.

Since 1968, Rannap has given numerous public piano performances.

Rannap has been active in management and composition for Ruja, Noor-Eesti and Hõim.

== Early life ==
Rannap was born on 6 October 1953 in Tallinn. His uncle is the writer Jaan Rannap, whose daughter is the Estonian zoologist Riinu Rannap.

== Career ==
Rannap gave his first solo concert in 1968. Since that time, he has performed piano concerts in many regions of the (former) Soviet Union, a number of European countries, as well as Australia and United States. In 1997 and 1999, he toured Estonia under the Klaver tuleb külla (Estonian for The Piano Comes to Visit) programme, transporting his piano to various churches in Estonia for the performances.

In 2007, Rannap was chosen as one of the three jury members of Eesti otsib superstaari, an Estonian remake of the British Pop Idol format.

== Piano pieces and cycles ==
"Naive and innocent Tracks" (1980–1982)

"Piano Concerto" (1984) "Cruise Control" (1991)

"Six-pack piano" (1997)

"Laulud klaveril" (2010)

"Sõrmepalavik" (2011)

== Discography ==
- "Varajased laulud" (2002)
- "Tantsib klaveril" (2004)
- "Läbi jäätunud klaasi" (2006)
- "Klaver tuleb külla 10 - parimad palad" (2007)
- "KlaveriKuld" (2009)
- "Ilus maa" (2009)
- "Hingelinnud" (2011)

== Sources ==
- Brief information at the Estonian Music Information Centre
