= Balss Maskā =

Latvian singing competition TV series

- Genre: Reality television Game show
- Based on: King of Mask Singer by Munhwa Broadcasting Corporation
- Presented by: Mārtiņš Spuris (1–2); Gints Andžāns (3–4)
- Starring: Samanta Tina; Baiba Sipeniece-Gavare; Jānis Krīvēns; Jānis Šipkēvics Sr. (1-3); Mārtiņš Spuris (4)
- Opening theme: "Who Are You" by The Who
- Country of origin: Latvia
- Original language: Latvian
- No. of seasons: 4
- No. of episodes: 42

Original release
- Network: TV3
- Release: 13 September 2020 – 5 May 2024

Related
- Masked Singer franchise King of Mask Singer; Maskis Laulja; Kaukės

Balss Maskā (Voice in a Mask) is a Latvian reality singing competition television series based on the Masked Singer franchise, which originated from the South Korean version of the show King of Mask Singer. The show was announced in August 2020, the same month shooting for the first season began. The program premiered on TV3 Latvia on 13 September 2020.

== Production ==
=== Format ===
A group of celebrities compete anonymously on stage, singing in full costumes over a series of episodes. Each episode, a portion of the competitors are paired off into face-off competitions, in which each will perform a song of his or her choice. From each face-off, the panelists and live audience vote: the winner's safe for the week, while the loser is put up for elimination. At the end of the episode, the losers of the face-offs are then subjected to new votes of the panelists to determine who will not continue; the eliminated singer then enters a special room backstage where it turns its back to the camera, takes off its mask, then turns around to reveal his/her identity. In addition to the singing competition, hints to each masked singer's identity are offered during the show. Pre-taped interviews are given as hints and feature the celebrities' distorted voices. The panelists are given time to speculate the identity of the singer after the performance and ask them a single question to try and determine their identity. The show is pre-recorded in a studio in Riga.

=== Costumes ===
The costumes are partly replicates that were used in other international versions, notably on the Estonian counterpart, as well as national motifs such as Nelabais, a devil-like creature from the Latvian mythology or Rīga, the patron of the countries capital of the same name. The majority of the costumes were designed by Estonian designer Liisi Eesmaa, while three of them are the creation of Ance Beinaroviča in cooperation with the Latvian National Theatre.

== Panelists and host ==
Season 1 and 2 panelists and host

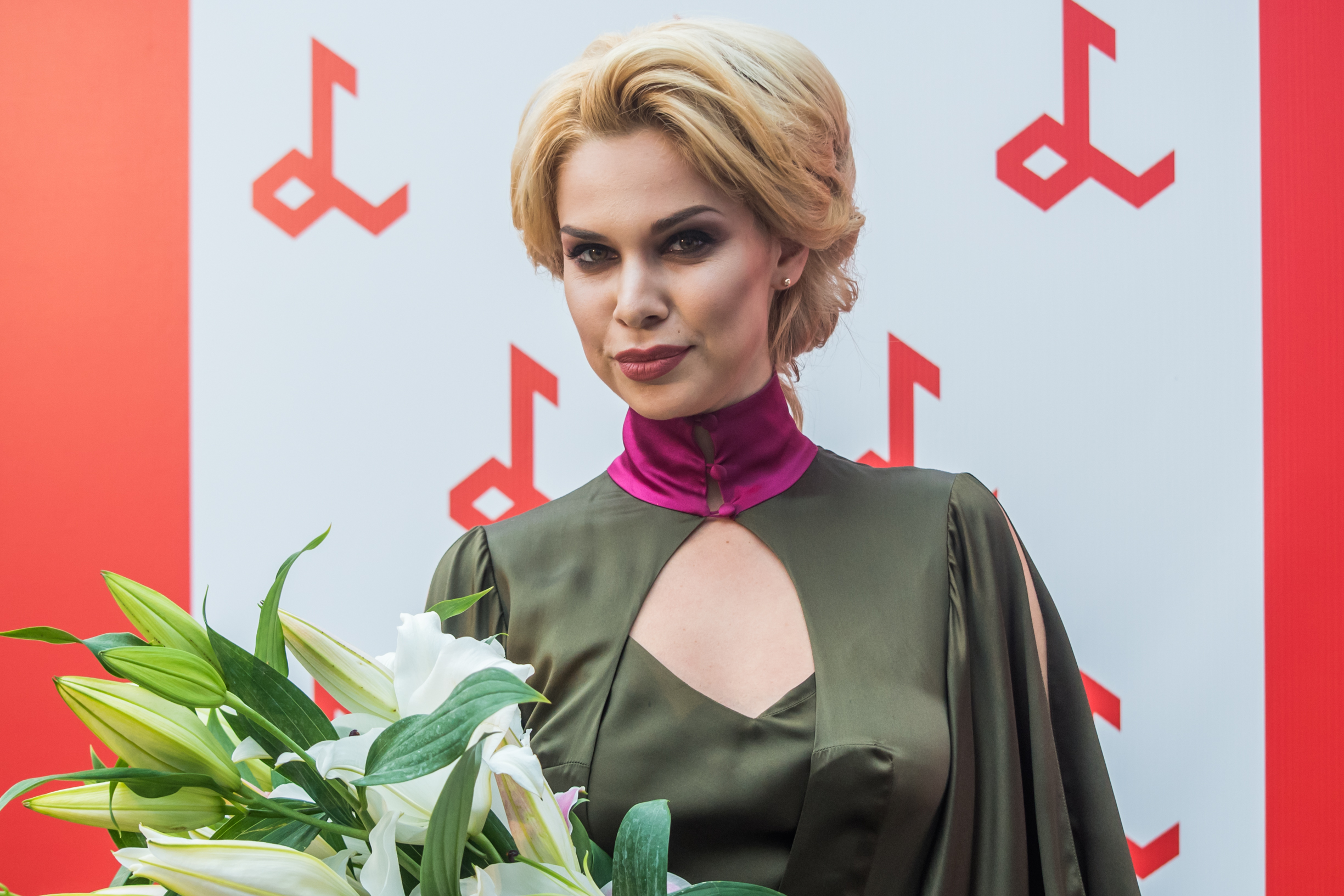
Samanta Tīna

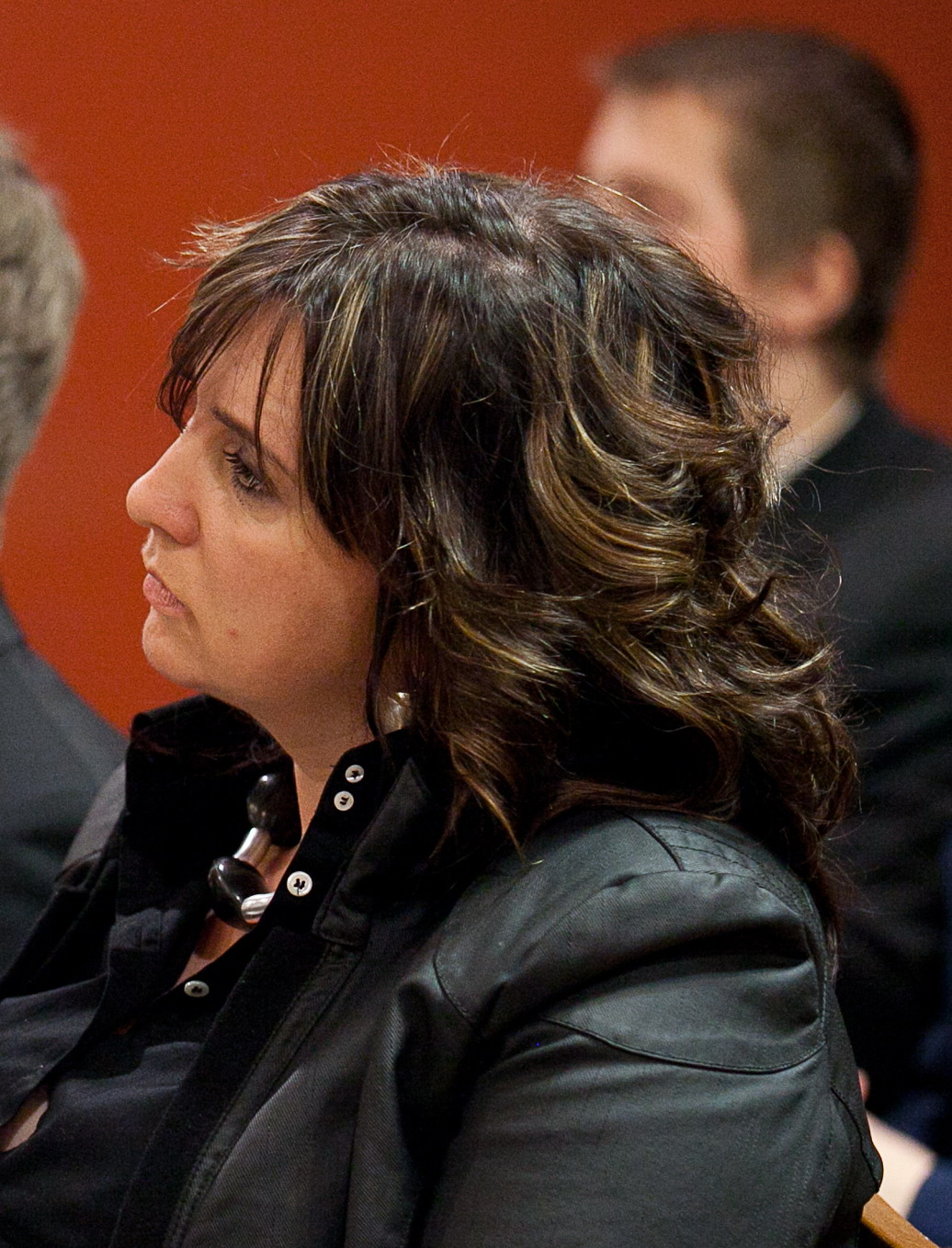
Baiba Sipeniece-Gavare

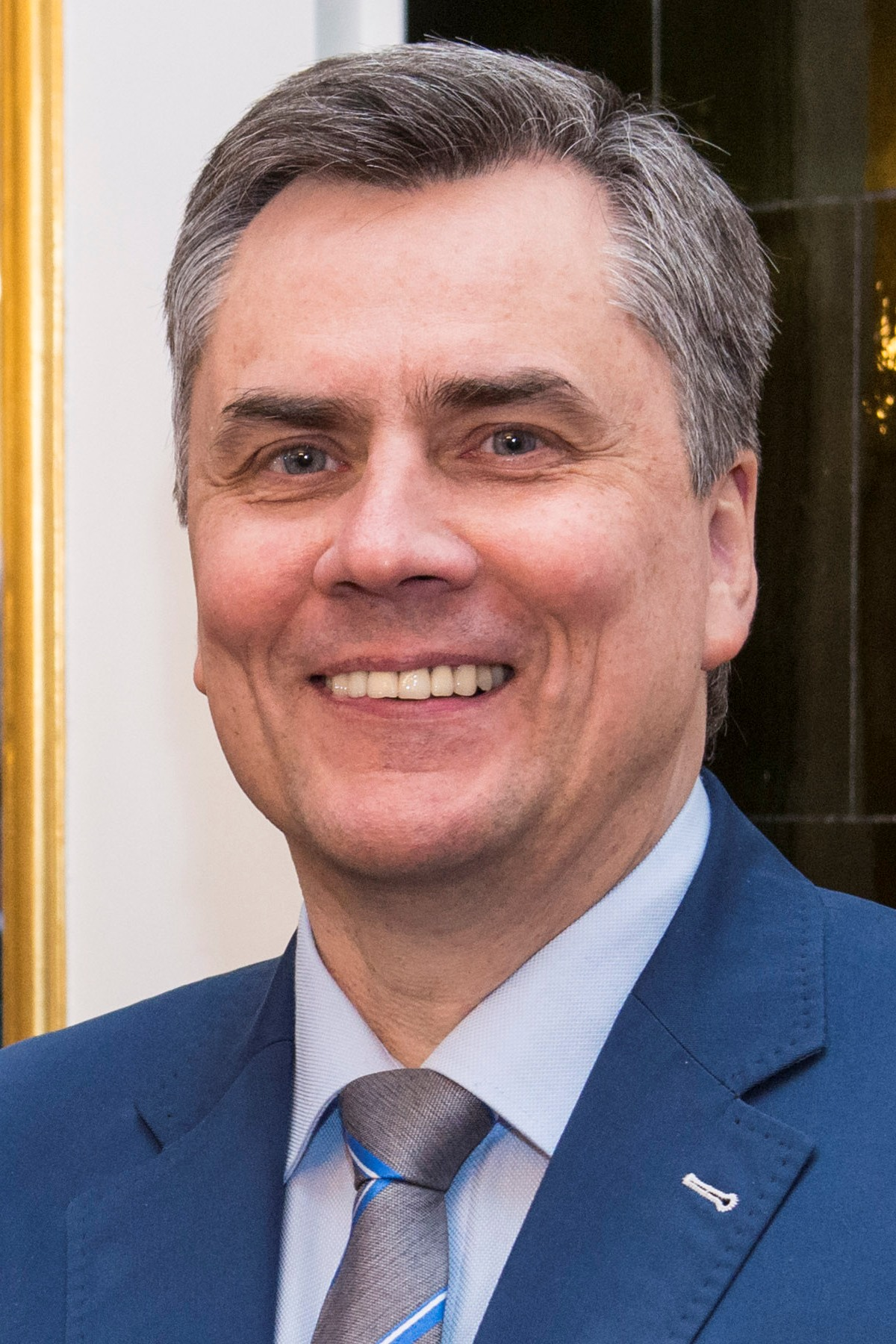
Jānis Šipkēvics sr.

Jānis Krīvēns

Mārtiņš Spuris was announced as the show's presenter on 8 August 2020. The panel of judges was announced on 19 August 2020. It consists of popular singer Samanta Tīna (the country's chosen representative for the canceled Eurovision Song Contest in 2020), comedian Baiba Sipeniece-Gavare, Jānis Šipkēvics Sr., journalist and director of Radio SWH, and Jānis Krīvēns, lead singer of the rock group Singapūras Satīns.

== Series overview ==
Series overview
Series	Contestants	Episodes	Originally released		Winner	Runner-up	Third place
Series	Contestants	Episodes	First released	Last released	Winner	Runner-up	Third place
1	12	11	13 September 2020	29 November 2020	Kristaps Strūbergs as "Demon"	Aminata Savadogo as "Doll"	Justs as "Sparrow"
2	12	10	13 March 2021	9 May 2021	Gints Andžāns as "White Wolf"	Anmary as "Daughter of the Sun"	Aija Vītoliņa as "Phoenix"
3	12	10	26 February 2023	30 April 2023	Kristīne Garklāva as "Lucky Bear"	Jolanta Strikaite-Lapiņa as "Snowflake"	Kaspars Breidaks as "Black Raven"
4	13	11	25 February 2024	5 May 2024	Nansija Garkalne as "Fox"	Ieva Kerevica as "Heart"	Katō as "Slime"

== Season 1 (2020) ==
Stage name	Celebrity	Notability	Episodes										
Stage name	Celebrity	Notability	1	2	3	4	5	6	7	8	9	10	11
Nelabais ("Demon")	Kristaps Strūbergs	Musician	WIN		SAFE		SAFE	SAFE	SAFE	SAFE	SAFE	SAFE	WINNER
Lelle ("Doll")	Aminata Savadogo	Singer		WIN		SAFE	SAFE	SAFE	SAFE	SAFE	SAFE	SAFE	RUNNER-UP
Zvirbulis ("Sparrow")	Justs	Singer	WIN		SAFE		SAFE	SAFE	RISK	SAFE	RISK	THIRD	
Lutausis	Kaspars Zemītis	Guitarist		RISK		SAFE	SAFE	SAFE	SAFE	RISK	OUT		
Rīga ("Riga")	Ērika Eglija-Grāvele	Actress	RISK		SAFE		SAFE	SAFE	SAFE	OUT			
Disko Pele ("Disco Mouse")	Linita Mediņa	Singer	RISK		SAFE		RISK	RISK	OUT				
Mākonis ("Cloud")	Ingus Ulmanis	Musician		RISK		SAFE	SAFE	OUT					
Zieds ("Flower")	Aleksandrs Samoilovs	Beach Volleyball Player		WIN		SAFE	OUT						
Acs ("Eye")	Ilze Jaunalksne-Rēdere	TV Presenter & Journalist		WIN		OUT							
Lauva ("Lion")	Dagmāra Legante	TV Personality	WIN		OUT								
Auns ("Ram")	Valters Pūce	Cellist		OUT									
Cikāde ("Cicada")	Elita Mīlgrāve	Musician	OUT										

The masked singer won their face-off and remained in the competition.
The masked singer lost their face-off and was in the bottom three/two, but was not eliminated.
The masked singer was safe from elimination.
The masked singer was eliminated from the competition and unmasked upon their elimination.

Episodes

=== Episode 1 (13 September) ===
#	Stage Name	Song	Identity	Result
1	Demon	"Alors on danse" by Stromae	undisclosed	WIN
2	Disco Mouse	"Dancing in the Moonlight" by Toploader	undisclosed	RISK
3	Cicada	"Can't Get You Out of My Head" by Kylie Minogue	Elita Mīlgrāve	OUT
4	Lion	"Material Girl" by Madonna	undisclosed	WIN
5	Riga	"Bungādiņas" by Aisha	undisclosed	RISK
6	Sparrow	"Uptown Funk" by Mark Ronson ft. Bruno Mars	undisclosed	WIN

=== Episode 2 (20 September) ===
#	Stage Name	Song	Identity	Result
1	Eye	"Sweet Dreams (Are Made of This)" by Eurythmics	undisclosed	WIN
2	Lutausis	"You Never Can Tell" by Chuck Berry	undisclosed	RISK
3	Ram	"Ballējam Neguļam" by Bermudu Divstūris	Valters Pūce	OUT
4	Flower	"Freestyler" by Bomfunk MC's	undisclosed	WIN
5	Doll	"Dance Monkey" by Tones and I	undisclosed	WIN
6	Cloud	"Balerīna" by Dzelzs Vilks	undisclosed	RISK

=== Episode 3 (27 September) ===
#	Stage Name	Song	Identity	Result
1	Lion	"Blinding Lights" by The Weeknd	Dagmāra Legante	OUT
2	Sparrow	"Kolekcionārs" by Dons	undisclosed	SAFE
3	Riga	"Oops!...I Did It Again" by Britney Spears	undisclosed	SAFE
4	Demon	"šeit" by Linga	undisclosed	SAFE
5	Disco Mouse	"Let's Twist Again" by Chubby Checker	undisclosed	SAFE

=== Episode 4 (4 October) ===
#	Stage Name	Song	Identity	Result
1	Flower	"Personal Jesus" by Depeche Mode	undisclosed	SAFE
2	Cloud	"Mākonis" by Aigars Voitišķis and Ingus Ulmanis	undisclosed	SAFE
3	Doll	"Bring Me To Life" by Evanescence	undisclosed	SAFE
4	Eye	"Manas Mīļākās Puķes" by Zodiaks	Ilze Jaunalksne-Rēdere	OUT
5	Lutausis	"Back for Good" by Take That	undisclosed	SAFE

=== Episode 5 (11 October) ===
#	Stage Name	Song	Identity	Result
1	Lutausis	"Dziesmiņa par vindserfingu" by Ingus Pētersons	undisclosed	SAFE
2	Riga	"Euphoria" by Loreen	undisclosed	SAFE
3	Demon	"Song 2" by Blur	undisclosed	SAFE
4	Disco Mouse	"Y.M.C.A" by Village People	undisclosed	RISK
5	Sparrow	"Wake Me Up" by Avicii ft Aloe Blacc	undisclosed	SAFE
6	Cloud	"I Will Wait" by Mumford & Sons	undisclosed	SAFE
7	Doll	"Work Bitch" by Britney Spears	undisclosed	SAFE
8	Flower	"Johnny B. Goode" by Chuck Berry	Aleksandrs Samoilovs	OUT

=== Episode 6 (18 October) ===
#	Stage Name	Song	Identity	Result
1	Lutausis	"I'm a Believer" by The Monkees	undisclosed	SAFE
2	Demon	"Cotton Eyed Joe" by Rednex	undisclosed	SAFE
3	Disco Mouse	"Have You Ever Seen the Rain?" by Creedence Clearwater Revival	undisclosed	RISK
4	Sparrow	"Happy" by Pharrell Williams	undisclosed	SAFE
5	Doll	"Somewhere Over the Rainbow" by Judy Garland	undisclosed	SAFE
6	Cloud	"Santa Lucia" by Robertino Loreti	Ingus Ulmanis	OUT
7	Riga	"Miglas Rīts" by Intars Busulis	undisclosed	SAFE

=== Episode 7 (25 October) ===
#	Stage Name	Song	Identity	Result
1	Doll	"Waka Waka (This Time for Africa)" by Shakira	undisclosed	SAFE
2	Riga	"My Heart Will Go On" by Celine Dion	undisclosed	SAFE
3	Lutausis	"You're My Heart, You're My Soul" by Modern Talking	undisclosed	SAFE
4	Disco Mouse	"Tuvumā Tālumā" by A-Eiropa	Linita Mediņa	OUT
5	Sparrow	"Rock DJ" by Robbie Williams	undisclosed	RISK
6	Demon	"Es nevaru būt balts" by Tranzīts	undisclosed	SAFE

=== Episode 8 (1 November) ===
#	Stage Name	Song	Identity	Result
1	Sparrow	"Yellow" by Coldplay	undisclosed	SAFE
2	Demon	"Are You Gonna Go My Way" by Lenny Kravitz	undisclosed	SAFE
3	Riga	"Ezers" by Haralds Sīmanis	Ērika Eglija-Grāvele	OUT
4	Doll	"Bad Guy" by Billie Eilish	undisclosed	SAFE
5	Lutausis	"Zemes stunda" by ansis	undisclosed	RISK

=== Episode 9 (8 November) ===
#	Stage Name	Song	Identity	Result
1	Lutausis	"Salauzta Sirds" by Dons	Kaspars Zemītis	OUT
2	Sparrow	"Fly Me to the Moon" by Frank Sinatra	undisclosed	RISK
3	Doll	"Māsa upe" by Dons	undisclosed	SAFE
4	Demon	"Vienmēr tu" by Saules Krasts	undisclosed	SAFE

=== Episode 10 (15 November) ===
#	Stage name	Song	Identity	Result
1	Demon	"Es nevaru būt balts" by Tranzīts	undisclosed	SAFE
1	Demon	"Mūžīgais piedāvājums" by Jauns Mēness	undisclosed	SAFE
2	Sparrow	"Kolekcionārs" by Dons	Justs	THIRD
2	Sparrow	"Riņķa deja" by rolands če	Justs	THIRD
3	Doll	"Māsa upe" by Dons	undisclosed	SAFE
3	Doll	"Zemeslodes" by Instrumenti	undisclosed	SAFE

=== Episode 11 (29 November) ===
#	Stage name	Song	Identity	Result
1	Demon	"Are You Gonna Go My Way" by Lenny Kravitz	Kristaps Strūbergs	WINNER
1	Demon	"Моё сердце" by Сплин	Kristaps Strūbergs	WINNER
2	Doll	"Work Bitch" by Britney Spears	Aminata Savadogo	RUNNER-UP
2	Doll	"Symphony" by Clean Bandit ft Zara Larsson	Aminata Savadogo	RUNNER-UP

== Season 2 (2021) ==
Stage name	Celebrity	Notability	Episodes									
Stage name	Celebrity	Notability	1	2	3	4	5	6	7	8	9	10
Baltais Vilks ("White Wolf")	Gints Andzāns	Actor	RISK		SAFE		SAFE	SAFE	RISK	SAFE	SAFE	WINNER
Saules Meita ("Daughter of the Sun")	Anmary	Singer	WIN		SAFE		RISK	SAFE	SAFE	SAFE	RISK	RUNNER-UP
Fenikss ("Phoenix")	Aija Vitolina	Singer		RISK		SAFE	SAFE	SAFE	SAFE	RISK	SAFE	THIRD
Zebra	rolands če	Rapper		WIN		SAFE	SAFE	SAFE	SAFE	SAFE	OUT	
Planēta ("Planet")	Māris Grigalis	Musical Artist & TV Personality		WIN		SAFE	SAFE	SAFE	SAFE	OUT		
Taurenis ("Butterfly")	Jolanta Gulbe-Paškeviča	Singer		WIN		RISK	SAFE	RISK	OUT			
Siļķe Kažokā ("Herring in a Fur Coat")	Annu Pannu	Author	RISK		RISK		SAFE	OUT				
Spēkavīrs ("Strong Man")	Jānis Zaržeckis	Plastic Surgeon	WIN		SAFE		OUT					
Lūsis ("Lynx")	Gunta Baško	Basketball Player		RISK		OUT						
Sēne ("Mushroom")	Aleksandrs Pavlovs	Fashion Artist	WIN		OUT							
Ciklops ("Cyclops")	Lauris Aleksejevs	Chef		OUT								
Zilais Pūķis ("Blue Dragon")	Una Ulme	Journalist	OUT									
Vakara Zvaigzne ("Evening Star")	Dons	Singer										
Vakara Zvaigzne ("Evening Star")	Aija Andrejeva	Singer										
Vakara Zvaigzne ("Evening Star")	Aminata Savadogo	Singer										
Vakara Zvaigzne ("Evening Star")	Singapūras Satīns	Band										

The masked singer won their face-off and remained in the competition.
The masked singer lost their face-off and was in the bottom three/two, but was not eliminated.
The masked singer was safe from elimination.
The mask was a guest and was immediately unmasked after their performance.
The masked singer was eliminated from the competition and unmasked upon their elimination.

Episodes

=== Episode 1 (7 March) ===
#	Stage Name	Song	Identity	Result
1	Strong Man	"Tāpēc jau, ka nevar zināt, kāpēc..." by Raimonds Pauls	undisclosed	WIN
2	Blue Dragon	"In Your Eyes" by Kylie Minogue	Una Ulme	OUT
3	Daughter of the Sun	"The Click Song" by Miriam Makeba	undisclosed	WIN
4	White Wolf	"Rock Around the Clock" by Bill Haley & His Comets	undisclosed	RISK
5	Mushroom	"Visā visumā Visums ir viss" by Instrumenti	undisclosed	WIN
6	Herring in a Fur Coat	"Can't Stop the Feeling!" by Justin Timberlake	undisclosed	RISK

=== Episode 2 (14 March) ===
#	Stage Name	Song	Identity	Result
1	Butterfly	"Thunderstruck" by AC/DC	undisclosed	WIN
2	Lynx	"Antidepresanti" by ZeBrene	undisclosed	RISK
3	Cyclops	"It's Now or Never" by Elvis Presley	Lauris Aleksejevs	OUT
4	Planet	"Rēdereja" by Sergejs Jēgers & Uldis Marhilēvičs	undisclosed	WIN
5	Zebra	"Axel F" by Crazy Frog	undisclosed	WIN
6	Phoenix	"Paper Planes" by M.I.A.	undisclosed	RISK

=== Episode 3 (21 March) ===
#	Stage Name	Song	Identity	Result
1	Daughter of the Sun	"Man in the Mirror" by Michael Jackson	undisclosed	SAFE
2	Herring in a Fur Coat	"Stāvēju, dziedāju" by Skandi	undisclosed	RISK
3	Mushroom	"Sway" by Michael Bublé	Aleksandrs Pavlovs	OUT
4	Strong Man	"Labu Nakti" by Edgars Zveja	undisclosed	SAFE
5	White Wolf	"September" by Earth, Wind & Fire	undisclosed	SAFE

=== Episode 4 (28 March) ===
#	Stage Name	Song	Identity	Result
1	Planet	"Es Karājos Tavā Bizē" by Buks, Līvi, & Saldais	undisclosed	SAFE
2	Zebra	"Papa Carlo" by Niko Schäuble	undisclosed	SAFE
3	Phoenix	"Ordinary World" by Duran Duran	undisclosed	SAFE
4	Butterfly	"Eternal Flame" by The Bangles	undisclosed	RISK
5	Lynx	"Relight My Fire" by Dan Hartman	Gunta Baško	OUT

=== Episode 5 (4 April) ===
#	Stage Name	Song	Identity	Result
1	White Wolf	"Summer of '69" by Bryan Adams	undisclosed	SAFE
2	Strong Man	"I Can't Dance" by Genesis	Jānis Zaržeckis	OUT
3	Phoenix	"Everything I Wanted" by Billie Eilish	undisclosed	SAFE
4	Daughter of the Sun	"I'll Be There" by Jess Glynne	undisclosed	RISK
5	Herring in a Fur Coat	"Too Good at Goodbyes" by Sam Smith	undisclosed	SAFE
6	Butterfly	"Memory" by Andrew Lloyd Webber	undisclosed	SAFE
7	Zebra	"Can't Feel My Face" by The Weeknd	undisclosed	SAFE
8	Planet	"Time to Say Goodbye" by Andrea Bocelli & Sarah Brightman	undisclosed	SAFE

=== Episode 6 (11 April) ===
#	Stage Name	Song	Identity	Result
1	Phoenix	"Line" by Triana Park	undisclosed	SAFE
2	Herring in a Fur Coat	"Mainīt Pasauli" by Gustavs Butelis	Annu Pannu	OUT
3	Daughter of the Sun	"Chandelier" by Sia	undisclosed	SAFE
4	Planet	"Tev Piedzims Berns" by Dons	undisclosed	SAFE
5	Zebra	"I'm Not a Girl, Not Yet a Woman" by Britney Spears	undisclosed	SAFE
6	Butterfly	"Havana" by Camila Cabello ft. Young Thug	undisclosed	RISK
7	White Wolf	"All Summer Long" by Kid Rock	undisclosed	SAFE

=== Episode 7 (18 April) ===
#	Stage Name	Song	Identity	Result
1	Daughter of the Sun	"Krodzinieces Dziesma" by Vella Kalpi	undisclosed	SAFE
2	Planet	"The Ketchup Song (Aserejé)" by Las Ketchup	undisclosed	SAFE
3	Butterfly	"Sugar" by Maroon 5	Jolanta Gulbe-Paškeviča	OUT
4	Zebra	"Shots" by LMFAO ft. Lil Jon	undisclosed	SAFE
5	Phoenix	"Ice Ice Baby" by Vanilla Ice	undisclosed	SAFE
6	White Wolf	"Mazais Arbūzs" by Popkorna Lietus	undisclosed	RISK
7	Evening Star	"The Best" by Tina Turner	Dons	GUEST

=== Episode 8 (25 April) ===
#	Stage Name	Song	Identity	Result
1	Phoenix	"Pa Apli" by Very Cool People ft. Kristīne Prauliņa, Edavārdi, & Ansis	undisclosed	RISK
2	Zebra	"Tu Esi Vasarā" by Dzintars Čīča	undisclosed	SAFE
3	Planet	"Sēd uz sliekšņa pasaciņa" by Zigmars Liepiņš	Māris Grigalis	OUT
4	White Wolf	"Pie jūras dzīve mana" by Raimonds Pauls	undisclosed	SAFE
5	Daughter of the Sun	"Piededzini Mann" by Singapūras Satīns	undisclosed	SAFE
6	Evening Star	"Cry Baby" by Garnet Mimms & the Enchanters	Aija Andrejeva	GUEST

=== Episode 9 (2 May) ===
#	Stage Name	Song	Identity	Result
1	White Wolf	"Heroe" by Enrique Iglesias	undisclosed	SAFE
2	Phoenix	"Amar pelos dois" by Salvador Sobral	undisclosed	SAFE
3	Daughter of the Sun	"Addicted to Love" by Robert Palmer	undisclosed	RISK
4	Zebra	"(I Can't Get No) Satisfaction" by The Rolling Stones	rolands če	OUT
5	Evening Star	"Mamehbka" by Romu Tautas Mûzika	Aminata Savadogo	GUEST

=== Episode 10 (9 May) ===
#	Stage Name	Song	Identity	Result
1	Daughter of the Sun	"The Impossible Dream" by Mitch Leigh	undisclosed	SAFE
2	White Wolf	"Circle of Life" by Elton John	undisclosed	SAFE
3	Phoenix	"Habanera" by Georges Bizet	Aija Vītolina	THIRD
4	Evening Stars	"I Want It That Way" by Backstreet Boys	Singapūras Satīns	GUEST
Round Two
1	Daughter of the Sun	"The Click Song" by Miriam Makeba	Anmary	RUNNER-UP
2	White Wolf	"September" by Earth, Wind & Fire	Gints Andžāns	WINNER

== Season 3 (2023) ==
Stage name	Celebrity	Notability	Episodes									
Stage name	Celebrity	Notability	1	2	3	4	5	6	7	8	9	10
Laimes Lācis ("Lucky Bear")	Kristīne Garklāva	Journalist		WIN		SAFE		WIN	WIN	SAFE	SAFE	WINNER
Sniegpārsla ("Snowflake")	Jolanta Strikaite-Lapiņa	Singer		WIN		SAFE		RISK	RISK	SAFE	SAFE	RUNNER-UP
Melnais Krauklis ("Black Raven")	Kaspars Breidaks	Radio personality	WIN		SAFE		WIN		RISK	SAFE	SAFE	THIRD
Pērtiķis ("Monkey")	Mārcis Judzis	Singer	WIN		SAFE		WIN		WIN	RISK	OUT	
Briedis ("Deer")	Grēta Grantiņa	Singer		WIN		SAFE		WIN	WIN	OUT		
Zaķis ("Hare")	Lelde Ceriņa	Producer	RISK		RISK		RISK		OUT			
Rudzupuķe ("Cornflower")	Dace Pūce	Director		RISK		RISK		OUT				
Šaha Karalis ("Chess King")	Mārtiņš Spuris	Drummer	WIN		SAFE		OUT					
Vienradzis ("Unicorn")	Jānis Moisejs	Musician		RISK		OUT						
Astoņkājis ("Octopus")	Elza Rozentale	Singer	RISK		OUT							
Torte ("Cake")	Kristaps Zutis	Boxer		OUT								
Naktstaurenis ("Moth")	Dana Bjorka	Actress	OUT									
Planēta ("Planet")	Maksims Busels	Actor										
Ciklops ("Cyclops")	Aminata Savadogo	Singer										
Mākonis ("Cloud")	Sanda Dejus	Radio personality										
Lauva ("Lion")	Asnate Rancāne	Singer										
Lutausis un Disko Pele ("Disco Mouse")	Reinis Sējāns and Intars Busulis ("Bujāns")	Band										
Auns ("Ram")	Jānis Šipkēvičs Jr.	Singer										

The masked singer won their face-off and remained in the competition.
The masked singer lost their face-off and was in the bottom three/two, but was not eliminated.
The masked singer was safe from elimination.
The masked singer was eliminated from the competition and unmasked upon their elimination.

Episodes

=== Episode 1 (26 February) ===
#	Stage Name	Song	Identity	Result
1	Hare	"Kur Ir Mana Clits?" by Būū	undisclosed	RISK
2	Chess King	"Rolling In The Deep" by Adele	undisclosed	WIN
3	Monkey	"Another Love" by Tom Odell	undisclosed	WIN
4	Octopus	"Cotton Eye Joe" by Rednex	undisclosed	RISK
5	Black Raven	"L'Italiano" by Toto Cutugno	undisclosed	WIN
6	Moth	"Mamma Mia" by ABBA	Dana Bjorka	OUT

=== Episode 2 (5 March) ===
#	Stage Name	Song	Identity	Result
1	Unicorn	"Agrā rītā" by Bet Bet	undisclosed	RISK
2	Snowflake	"Material Girl" by Madonna	undisclosed	WIN
3	Cornflower	"Only Time" by Enya	undisclosed	RISK
4	Lucky Bear	"Riptide" by Vance Joy	undisclosed	WIN
5	Cake	"Peldētājs" by Jumprava	Kristaps Zutis	OUT
6	Deer	"Heal the World" by Michael Jackson	undisclosed	WIN

=== Episode 3 (12 March) ===
#	Stage Name	Song	Identity	Result
1	Hare	"All Summer Long" by Kid Rock	undisclosed	RISK
2	Black Raven	"The River of Dreams" by Billy Joel	undisclosed	WIN
3	Chess King	"Zitti e buoni" by Måneskin	undisclosed	WIN
4	Octopus	"Lielā zive" by Eolika	Elza Rozentale	OUT
5	Monkey	"Limuzīns uz krīta" by Citi Zēni	undisclosed	WIN

== Season 4 (2024) ==
Stage name	Celebrity	Notability	Episodes										
Stage name	Celebrity	Notability	1	2	3	4	5	6	7	8	9	10	11
Lapsa ("Fox")	Nansija Garkalne	Influencer		RISK		SAFE		WIN	SAFE	WIN	SAFE	WIN	WINNER
Sirds ("Heart")	Ieva Kerevica	Singer		WIN		RISK		RISK	SAFE	WIN	SAFE	RISK	RUNNER-UP
Slaims ("Slime")	KATŌ	Singer		RISK		SAFE		WIN	RISK	WIN	SAFE	RISK	THIRD
Princese ("Princess")	Lelde Dreimane	Actress	SAFE		WIN		SAFE		SAFE	RISK	SAFE	OUT	
Planēta ("Planet")	Armands Simsons	Television host	SAFE		RISK		SAFE		SAFE	RISK	OUT		
Kokteilis ("Cocktail")	Karīna Tatarinova	Actress	RISK		WIN		SAFE		SAFE	OUT			
Papagailis ("Parrot")	Liene Cipule	Medical director	SAFE		WIN		RISK		OUT				
Burvis ("Wizard")	Agris Daņiļevičs	Choreographer		WIN		SAFE		OUT					
Bebrs ("Beaver")	Arvis Zēmanis	TV host	SAFE		RISK		OUT						
Sams ("Catfish")	Mārtiņš Kozlovskis	Improvisator		WIN		OUT							
Mutants ("Mutant")	Jēkabs Rēdlihs	Ice hockey player	SAFE		OUT								
Fenikss ("Phoenix")	Māra Sleja	Model		OUT									
Virtulis ("Donut")	Magnuss Eriņš	TV host & DJ	OUT										
Laimes Lācis ("Lucky Bear")	Andrejs Reinis Zitmanis	Singer											
Astoņkājis (Octopus)	Inga Spriņģe	Journalist											
Lūsis (Lynx)	Aija Auškāpa	Manager											
Melnais Krauklis (Black Raven)	Kaspars Breidaks	Radio personality											

The masked singer won their face-off and remained in the competition.
The masked singer lost their face-off and was in the bottom three/two, but was not eliminated.
The masked singer was safe from elimination.
The masked singer was eliminated from the competition and unmasked upon their elimination.

Episodes

=== Episode 1 (25 February) ===
#	Stage Name	Song	Identity	Result
1	Beaver	"Think About Things" by Daði & Gagnamagnið	undisclosed	SAFE
2	Cocktail	"Balerīna" by Dzelzs Vilks	undisclosed	RISK
3	Planet	"Pretty Fly (For a White Guy)" by The Offspring	undisclosed	SAFE
4	Mutant	"Es izjāju prūšu zemi" by Ainars Mielavs, Andris Alviķis, & Kaspars Putniņš	undisclosed	SAFE
5	Princess	"Dance the Night" by Dua Lipa	undisclosed	SAFE
6	Parrot	"Kerijas Dziesma" by Mirdza Zīvere	undisclosed	SAFE
7	Donut	"Never Gonna Give You Up" by Rick Astley	Magnuss Eriņš	OUT

=== Episode 2 (3 March) ===
#	Stage Name	Song	Identity	Result
1	Slime	"I Don't Feel Like Dancin'" by Scissor Sisters	undisclosed	RISK
2	Heart	"Sweet Dreams" by Marilyn Manson	undisclosed	WIN
3	Phoenix	"Vēl Nav Par Vēlu" by Nora Bumbiere	Māra Sleja	OUT
4	Wizard	"Ievai" by Kaimiņi	undisclosed	WIN
5	Catfish	"Tuvumā, Tālumā (Tuvumā tālumā)" by A-Eiropa	undisclosed	WIN
6	Fox	"More Than a Woman" by Bee Gees	undisclosed	RISK

=== Episode 3 (10 March) ===
#	Stage Name	Song	Identity	Result
1	Cocktail	"Brāl' Ar Dzīvi Nekaulē" by Bermudu Divstūris	undisclosed	WIN
2	Planet	"Basket Case" by Green Day	undisclosed	RISK
3	Parrot	"Ugunsputns" by Žoržs Siksna	undisclosed	WIN
4	Mutant	"Youngblood" by The Naked and Famous	Jēkabs Rēdlihs	OUT
5	Beaver	"As It Was" by Harry Styles	undisclosed	RISK
6	Princess	"Unholy" by Sam Smith	undisclosed	WIN

=== Episode 4 (17 March) ===
#	Stage Name	Song	Identity	Result
1	Fox	"Beggin'" by Madcon	undisclosed	SAFE
2	Wizard	"Your Man" by Josh Turner	undisclosed	SAFE
3	Catfish	"Teenage Dirtbag" by Wheatus	Mārtiņš Kozlovskis	OUT
4	Slime	"Bloody Mary" by Lady Gaga	undisclosed	SAFE
5	Heart	"Like A Virgin" by Madonna	undisclosed	RISK
6	Lucky Bear	"I Love It" by Icona Pop	Andrejs Reinis Zitmanis	GUEST

=== Episode 5 (24 March) ===
#	Stage Name	Song	Identity	Result
1	Beaver	"Uptown Funk" by Mark Ronson ft. Bruno Mars / "Stitches" by Christoph Maria Herbst	Arvis Zēmanis	OUT
2	Parrot	"Dzeltenie aizkari" by Dakota	undisclosed	RISK
3	Princess	"Nothing Breaks Like a Heart" by Mark Ronson	undisclosed	SAFE
4	Planet	"Rollin’ (Air Raid Vehicle)" by Limp Bizkit	undisclosed	SAFE
5	Cocktail	"Maria" by Blondie	undisclosed	SAFE

=== Episode 6 (31 March) ===
- Group Performance: "Mamma Mia" by ABBA

#	Stage Name	Song	Identity	Result
1	Slime	"Stefania" by Kalush Orchestra	undisclosed	WIN
2	Wizard	"Slidotava" by Pērkons	Agris Daņiļevičs	OUT
3	Heart	"Believer" by Imagine Dragons	undisclosed	RISK
4	Fox	"Toxic" by Britney Spears	undisclosed	WIN
6	Octopus	"Big Fish" by Vince Staples	Inga Spriņģe	GUEST
