= Maskis Laulja =

Estonian television series

- Genre: Reality television Game show
- Based on: King of Mask Singer by Munhwa Broadcasting Corporation
- Presented by: Mart Sander
- Starring: Birgitte Susanne Hunt; Ženja Fokin; Mart Juur; Krista Lensin; Kristjan Jõekalda; Peeter Oja; Karl-Erik Taukar; Stefan Airapetjan
- Opening theme: "Who Are You" by The Who
- Country of origin: Estonia
- Original language: Estonian
- No. of seasons: 5
- No. of episodes: 40

Original release
- Network: TV3
- Release: 15 March 2020 – present

Related
- Masked Singer franchise King of Mask Singer; Masked Singer Suomi

Maskis Laulja is an Estonian reality singing competition television series based on the Masked Singer franchise which originated from the South Korean version of the show King of Mask Singer. It premiered on TV3 on 15 March 2020.

== Production ==
=== Format ===
A group of celebrities compete anonymously on stage, singing in full costumes over a series of episodes. Each episode, a portion of the competitors are paired off into face-off competitions, in which each will perform a song of his or her choice. From each face-off, the panelists and live audience vote: the winner's safe for the week, while the loser is put up for elimination. At the end of the episode, the losers of the face-offs are then subjected to new votes of the panelists to determine who will not continue; the eliminated singer then enters a special room backstage where it turns its back to the camera, takes off its mask, then turns around to reveal his/her identity.

In addition to the singing competition, hints to each masked singer's identity are offered during the show. Pre-taped interviews are given as hints and feature the celebrities' distorted voices. The panelists are given time to speculate the identity of the singer after the performance and ask them a single question to try and determine their identity.

=== Costumes and Costume Designers ===
The costumes of Season 1 and Season 2 were designed by Liisi Eesmaa and partly feature baltic and national motives such as Vanapagan, a devil-like creature from the Estonian mythology as well as Jonnipunni, an infant-like looking Doll that is one of the most-common-baby-articles of the countries or Kalevipoeg, the protagonist of National Epic. They are partly also used on the Latvian counterpart of the show.

The 10 costumes of Season 3 were designed by Grete Laus-Evestus Liisi Eesmaa- dark artist Grete Laus-Evestus (Artist name Grete Stitch Laus) designed 5 costumes- Lumehelbeke (Snowflake), Ronk (Raven), Tort (Cake), Ööliblikas (Night Butterfly/ Moth) and Jänes (Rabbit). Liisi Eesmaa designed the other 5 costumes- Hirv (Deer), Ükssarvik (Unicorn), Kaheksajalg (Octopus), Sinine Ahv (Blue Monkey) and Malekuningas (Chess King).

== Panelists and host ==
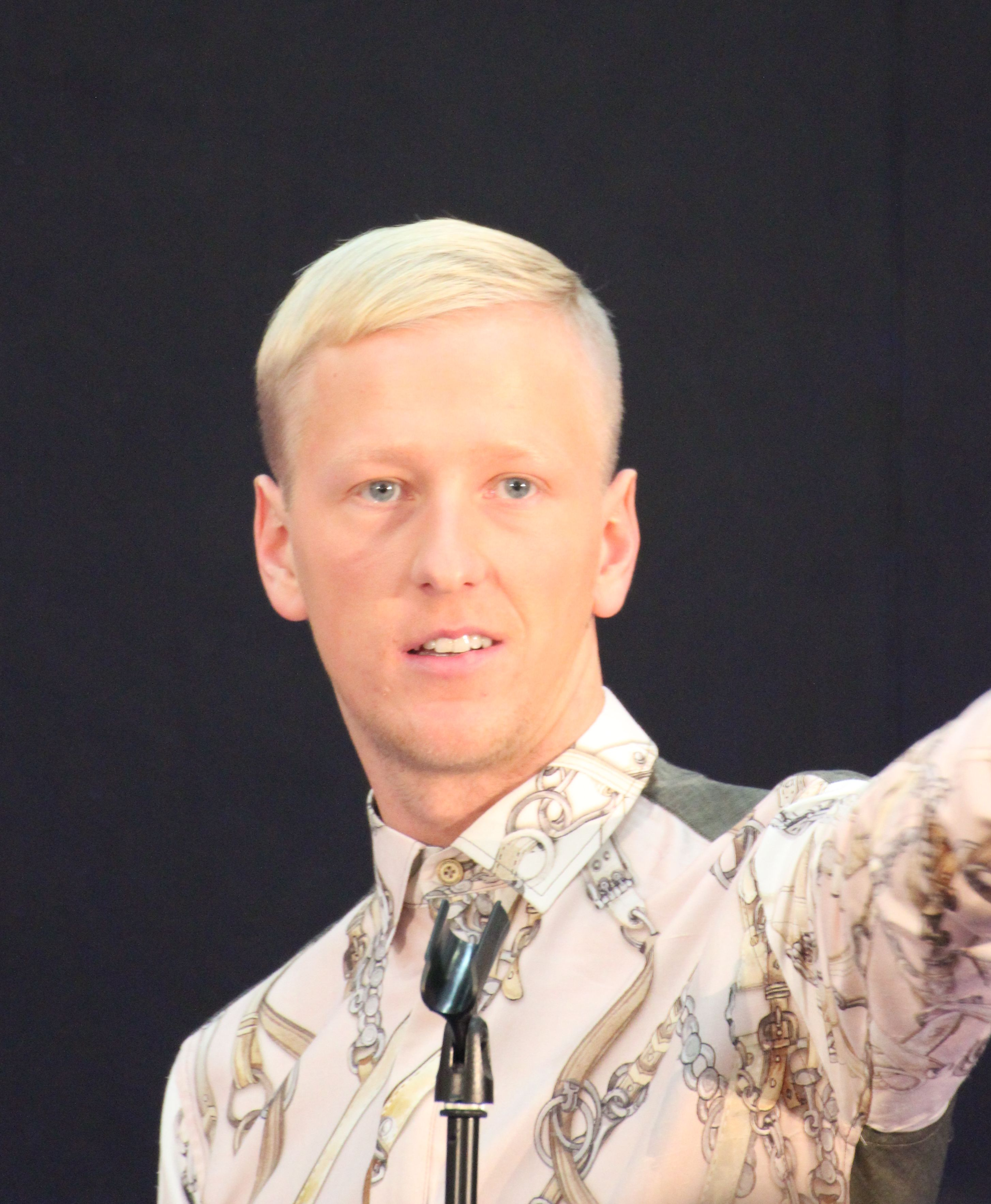
Ženja Fokin

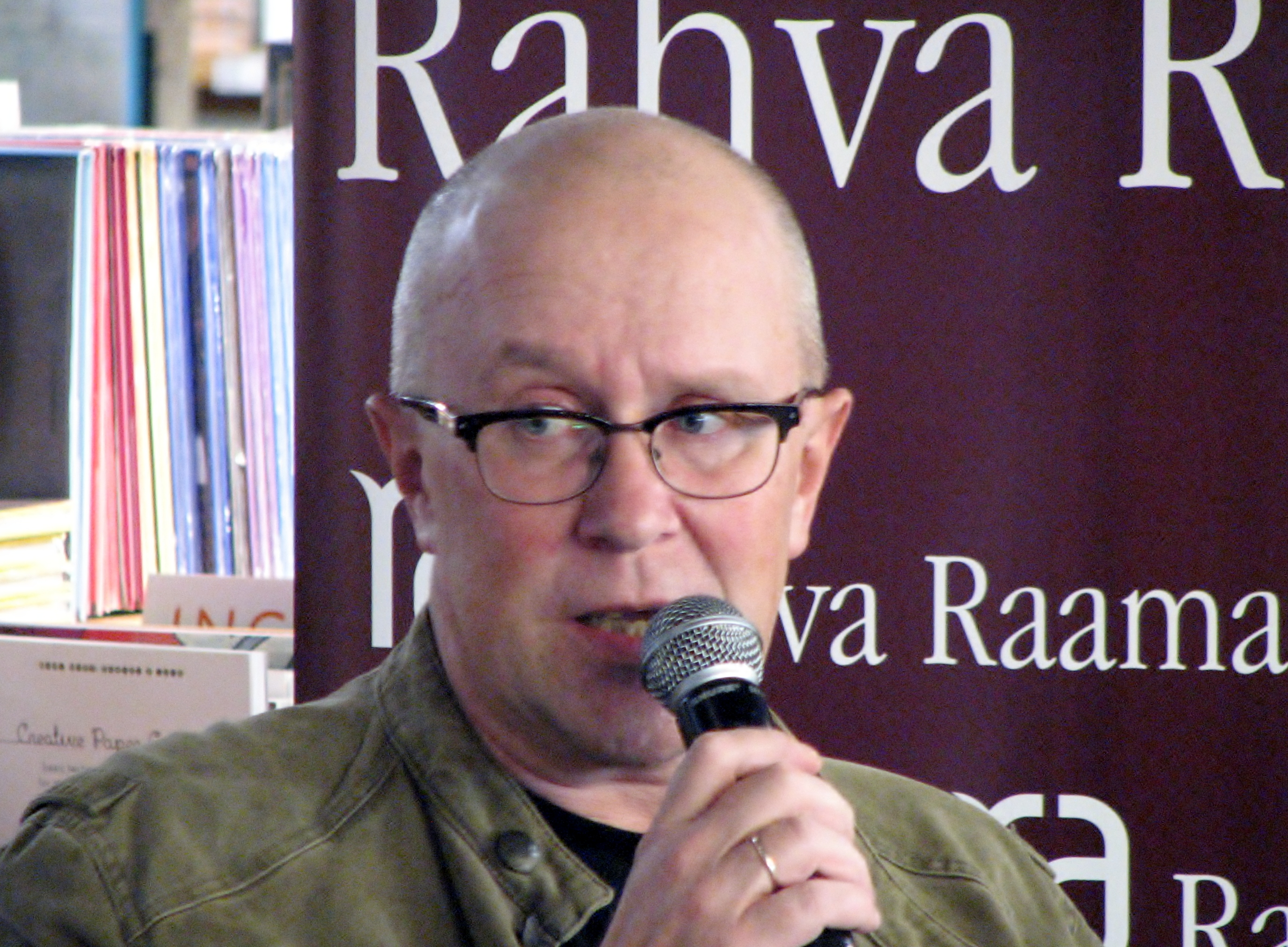
Mart Juur

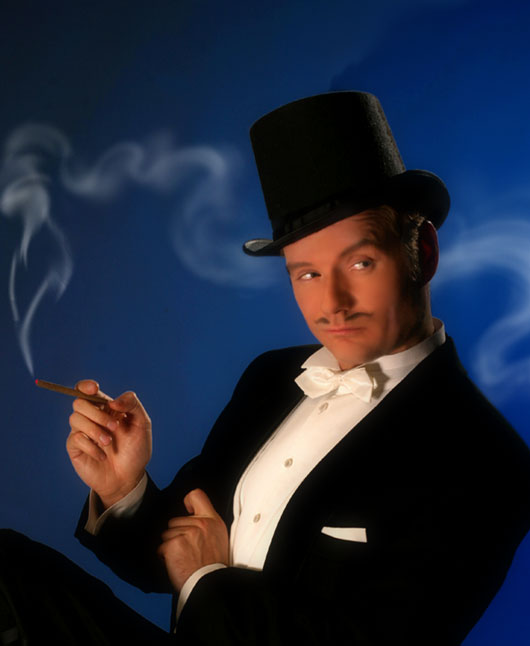
Mart Sander

The panelists and host for season one were announced on 3 March 2020. It featured TV host Krista Lensin, journalist, radio host and actress Brigitte Susanne Hunt, fashion artist Ženja Fokin and comedian Mart Juur. For the second season, Fokin was replaced by Kristjan Jõekalda. Entertainer Mart Sander is the presenter of the show.

== Series overview ==
Series overview
| Series | Contestants | Episodes | Originally released | | Winner | Runner-up | Third place |
| Series | Contestants | Episodes | First released | Last released | Winner | Runner-up | Third place |
|---|---|---|---|---|---|---|---|
| 1 | 10 | 8 | 15 March 2020 | 3 May 2020 | Stefan Airapetjan as "Aries" | Kaire Vilgats as "Flower" | Mart Mardisalu as "Insect" |
| 2 | 10 | 8 | 23 October 2020 | 6 December 2020 | Mikk Saar as "Arctic Wolf" | Elina Nechayeva as "Phoenix" | Henessi Schmidt as "Dragon" |
| 3 | 10 | 8 | 13 March 2022 | 8 May 2022 | Franz Malmsten as "Blue Monkey" | Hanno Pevkur as "Chess King" | Marta Laan as "Deer" |
| 4 | 10 | 8 | 24 March 2024 | 12 May 2024 | Genka as "Elephant" | Orm Oja as "Bull" | Ant Nurhan as "Puma" |
| 5 | 10 | 8 | 16 March 2025 | 4 May 2025 | Saara Pius as "Noise Bear" | Liis Lemsalu as "Fur Coat" | Karl Robert Saaremäe as "Fox" |

== Season 1 ==
The first season was announced on 7 February 2020 and started airing on 15 March 2020 and concluded on 3 May 2020. It featured 10 celebrities from the field of entertainment, music, film and theatre, journalism and politics and was won by Stefan Airapetjan.

=== Celebrities ===
| Stage name | Celebrity | Notability | Episodes | | | | | | | |
| Stage name | Celebrity | Notability | 1 | 2 | 3 | 4 | 5 | 6 | 7 | 8 |
|---|---|---|---|---|---|---|---|---|---|---|
| Jäär ("Aries") | Stefan Airapetjan | Singer | WIN | | | WIN | WIN | WIN | WIN | WINNER |
| Lill ("Flower") | Kaire Vilgats | Singer | WIN | | WIN | | WIN | WIN | RISK | RUNNER-UP |
| Putukas ("Insect") | Mart Mardisalu | Presenter | | WIN | | RISK | WIN | WIN | WIN | THIRD |
| Lövi ("Lion") | Kärt Anvelt | Journalist | WIN | | | WIN | RISK | RISK | OUT | |
| Pilv ("Cloud") | Toomas Uibo | Singer | RISK | | RISK | | RISK | OUT | | |
| Silmamuna ("Eyeball") | Kaisa Selde | Actress | | RISK | WIN | | OUT | | | |
| Jonnipunn ("Doll") | Getter Jaani | Singer | RISK | | | OUT | | | | |
| Sõdalane ("Warrior") | Toomas Luhats | Journalist | | WIN | OUT | | | | | |
| Rott ("Rat") | Laine Randjärv | Politician | | OUT | | | | | | |
| Vanapagan ("Devil") | Jaanus Nõgisto | Composer & Director | OUT | | | | | | | |

The masked singer won their face-off and remained in the competition.
The masked singer lost their face-off and was in the bottom three/two, but was not eliminated.
The masked singer was safe from elimination.
The masked singer was eliminated from the competition and unmasked upon their elimination.
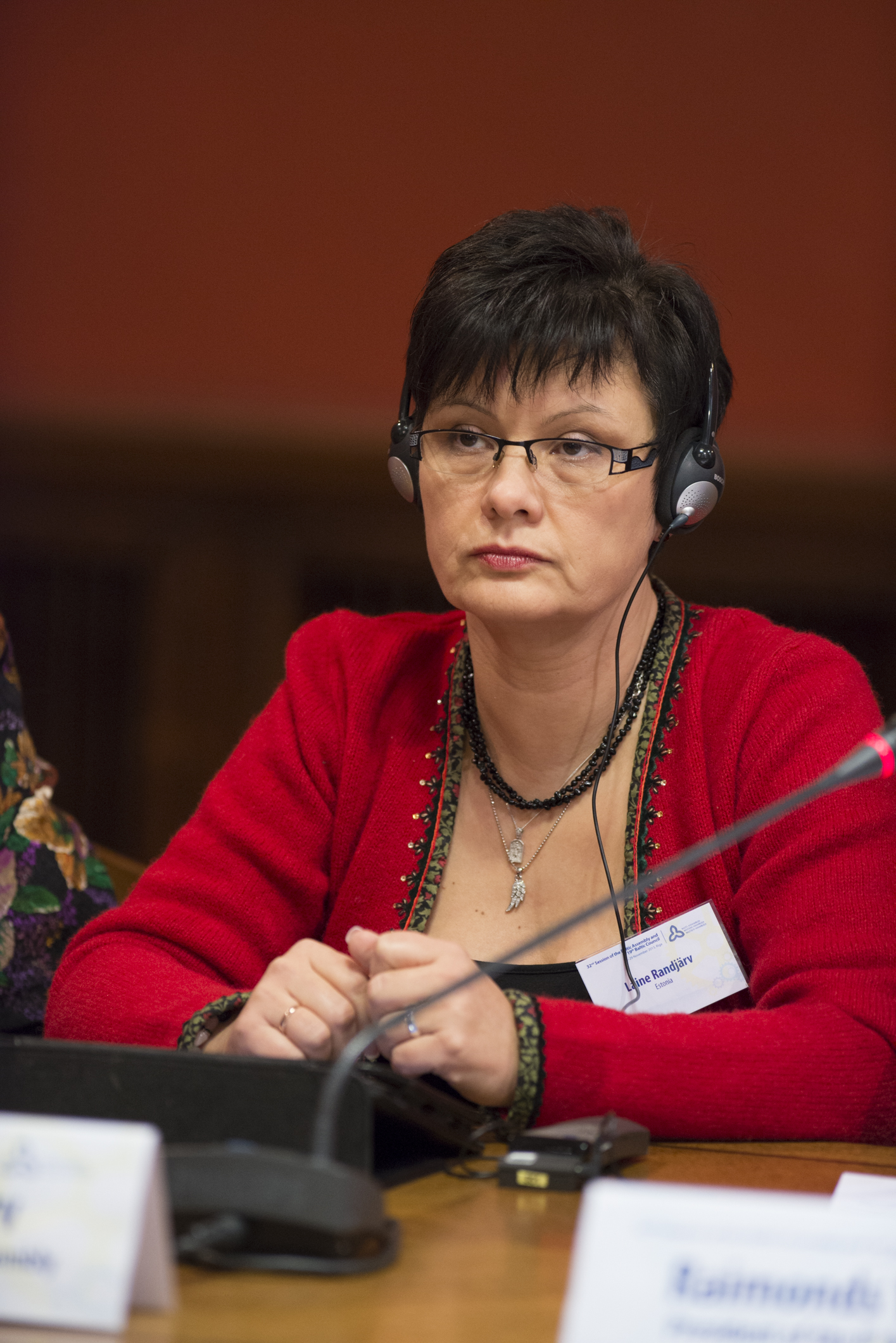
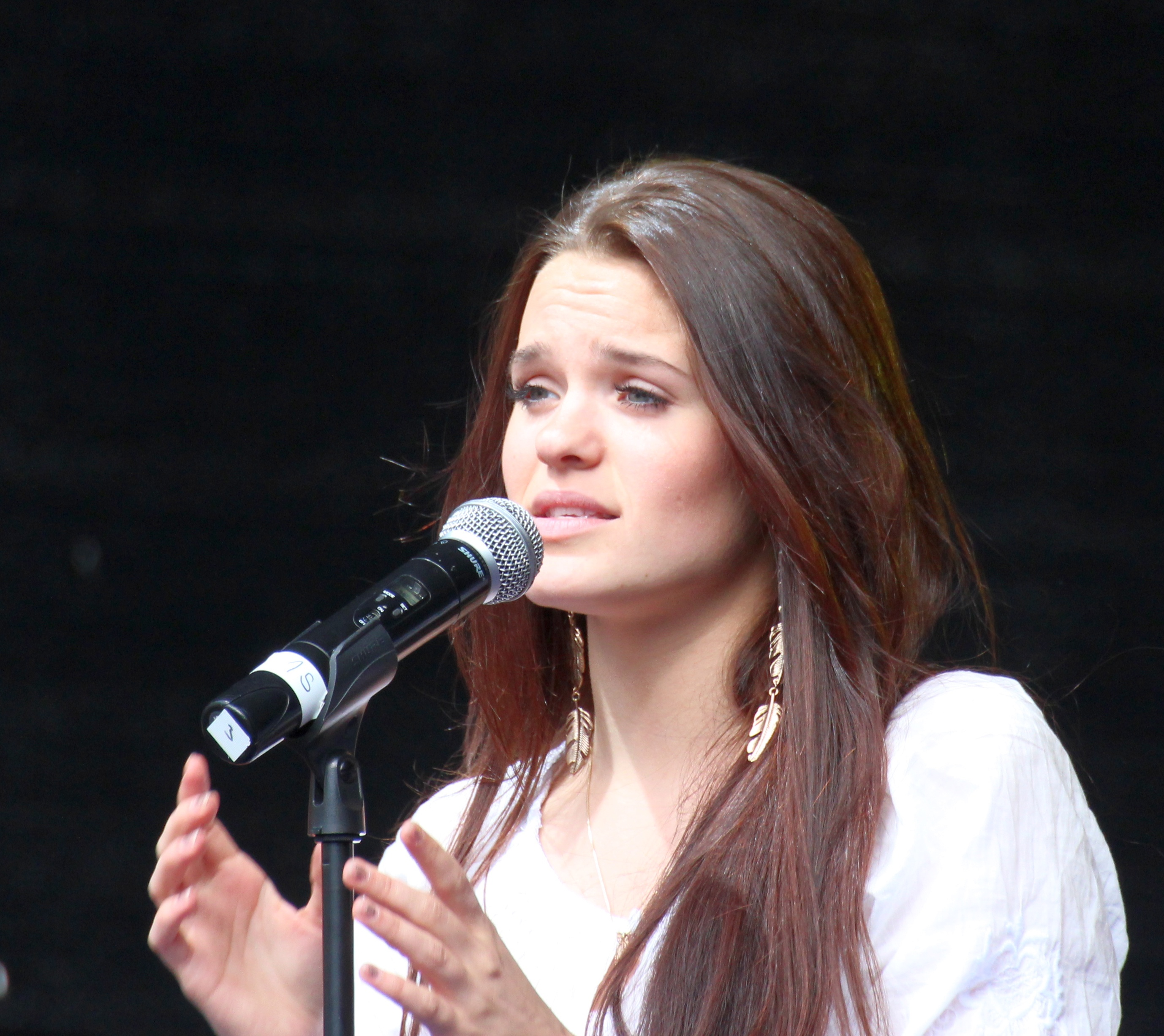
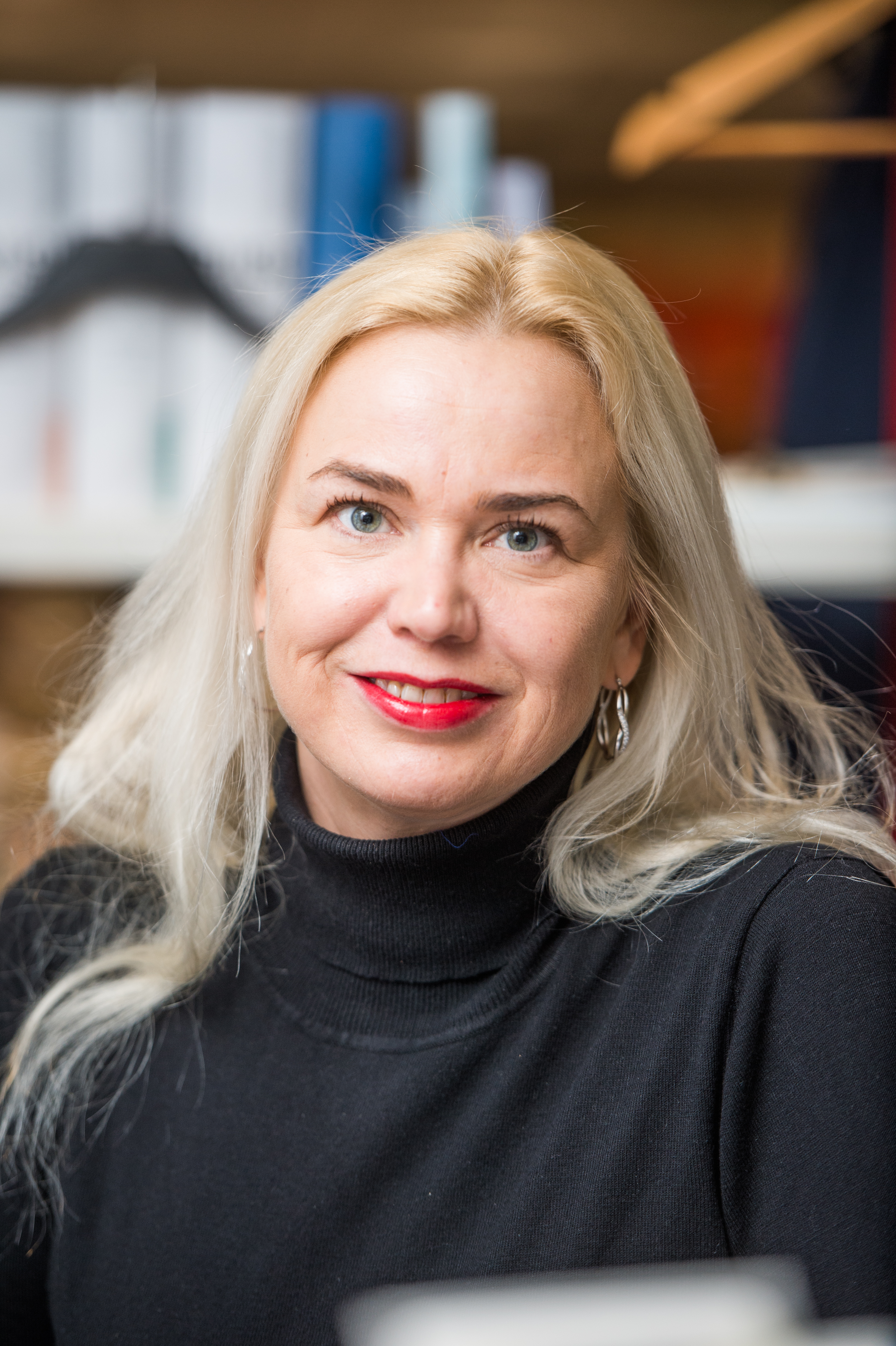
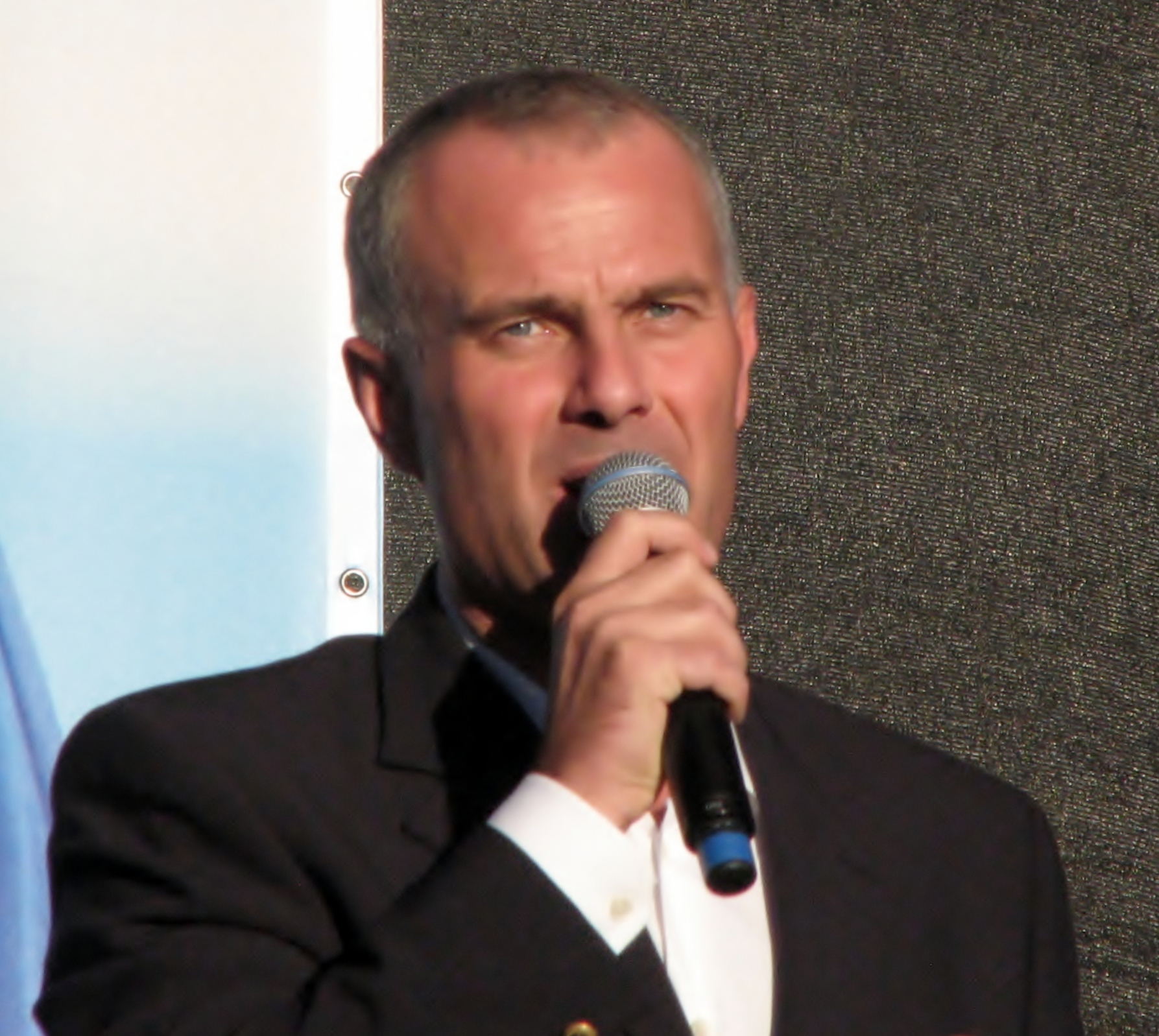
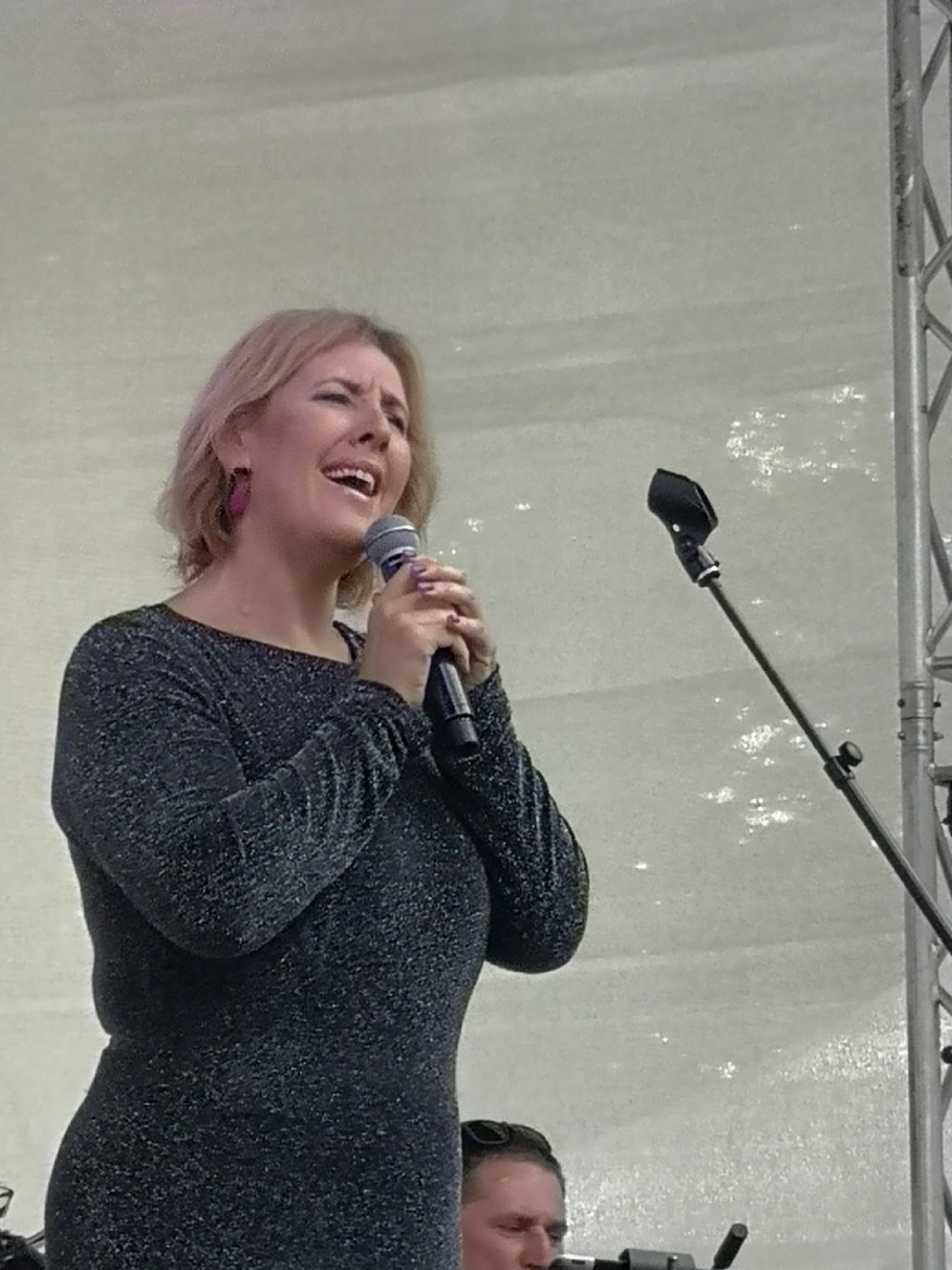
Some of the celebrities who competed in the first season of Maskis Laulja, pictured in order of elimination (l-r):
Laine Randjärv ("Rat"), Getter Jaani ("Jonnipunni"), Kärt Anvelt ("Lion"), Mart Mardisalu ("Insect"), Kaire Vilgats ("Flower").

== Episodes ==
=== Episode 1 (15 March) ===
| # | Stage Name | Song | Identity | Result |
|---|---|---|---|---|
| 1 | Cloud | "Hey Brother" by Avicii | RISK | |
| 2 | Aries | "Fly Me to the Moon" by Frank Sinatra | WIN | |
| 3 | Lion | "Hea tuju laul" by Anne Veski | WIN | |
| 4 | Devil | "White Wedding" by Billy Idol | RISK | |
| 5 | Doll | "I Put a Spell on You" by Annie Lennox | RISK | |
| 6 | Flower | "Over the Hills and Far Away" by Gary Moore | WIN | |
Sing-Off
| 1 | Cloud | "Kiki Miki" by Papa Suur | undisclosed | SAFE |
| 2 | Devil | "Here Comes the Sun" by The Beatles | Jaanus Nõgisto | OUT |
| 3 | Doll | "24K Magic" by Bruno Mars | undisclosed | SAFE |

=== Episode 2 (22 March) ===
| # | Stage Name | Song | Identity | Result |
|---|---|---|---|---|
| 1 | Rat | "Tsirkus" by Fix | RISK | |
| 2 | Insect | "Love Is in the Air" by John Paul Young | WIN | |
| 3 | Warrior | "Mãssasjate laul" by J.M.K.E. | WIN | |
| 4 | Eyeball | "Like A Virgin" by Madonna | RISK | |
Sing-Off
| 1 | Rat | "Somebody Loves Me" by Ella Fitzgerald | Laine Randjärv | OUT |
| 2 | Eyeball | "Heiki" | undisclosed | SAFE |

=== Episode 3 (29 March) ===
| # | Stage Name | Song | Identity | Result |
|---|---|---|---|---|
| 1 | Flower | "Sweet Dreams (Are Made of This)" by Eurythmics | WIN | |
| 2 | Warrior | "Joogilaul" by Arved Haug | RISK | |
| 3 | Cloud | "Blurred Lines" by Robin Thicke feat. Pharrell Williams and T.I. | RISK | |
| 4 | Eyeball | "Ühiselu" by Kukerpillid | WIN | |
Sing-Off
| 1 | Warrior | "Old Town Road" by Lil Nas X and Billy Ray Cyrus | Toomas Luhats | OUT |
| 2 | Cloud | "Space Oddity" by David Bowie | undisclosed | SAFE |

=== Episode 4 (5 April) ===
| # | Stage Name | Song | Identity | Result |
|---|---|---|---|---|
| 1 | Doll | "Proud Mary" by Tina Turner | RISK | |
| 2 | Aries | "für Oksana" by Nublu | WIN | |
| 3 | Lion | "Nothing Else Matters" by Metallica | WIN | |
| 4 | Insect | "Achy Breaky Heart" by Billy Ray Cyrus | RISK | |
Sing-Off
| 1 | Doll | "Need read" by Karl-Erik Taukar | Getter Jaani | OUT |
| 2 | Insect | "I Promised Myself" by Nick Kamen | undisclosed | SAFE |

=== Episode 5 (12 April) ===
| # | Stage Name | Song | Identity | Result |
|---|---|---|---|---|
| 1 | Cloud | "Jää jumalaga puberteet" by Singer Vinger | RISK | |
| 2 | Aries | "Jailhouse Rock" by Elvis Presley | WIN | |
| 3 | Eyeball | "Rulli, rulli, rulli" by Öed | RISK | |
| 4 | Insect | "Georgia (On My Mind)" by Egert Milder | WIN | |
| 5 | Lion | "Bad Romance" by Lady Gaga | RISK | |
| 6 | Flower | "Kuninganna" by Fix | WIN | |
Sing-Off
| 1 | Eyeball | "Rich Girl" by Gwen Stefani | Kaisa Selde | OUT |
| 2 | Cloud | "Wicked Game" by Chris Isaak | undisclosed | SAFE |
| 3 | Lion | "Sajab mehi" by Family | undisclosed | SAFE |

=== Episode 6 (19 April) ===
| # | Stage Name | Song | Identity | Result |
|---|---|---|---|---|
| 1 | Cloud | "Weather with You" by Crowded House | RISK | |
| 2 | Insect | "La camisa negra" by Juanes | WIN | |
| 3 | Flower | "Diamonds" by Rihanna | WIN | |
| 4 | Lion | "Naine" by Sadamasild | RISK | |
| 5 | Aries | "Human" by Rag'n'Bone Man | WIN | |
Sing-Off
| 1 | Cloud | "Heroes" by Måns Zelmerlöw | Toomas Uibo | OUT |
| 2 | Lion | "Go West" by Pet Shop Boys | undisclosed | SAFE |

=== Episode 7 (26 April) ===
| # | Stage Name | Song | Identity | Result |
|---|---|---|---|---|
| 1 | Flower | "Bohemian Rhapsody" by Queen | RISK | |
| 2 | Aries | "Take Me to Church" by Hozier | WIN | |
| 3 | Insect | "Ühega miljoneist" by 2 Quick Start | WIN | |
| 4 | Lion | "The Lion Sleeps Tonight" by The Tokens | RISK | |
Sing-Off
| 1 | Flower | "Let It Go" by James Bay | undisclosed | SAFE |
| 2 | Lion | "Let's play love" by Jaak Joala | Kärt Anvelt | OUT |

=== Episode 8 - Finale (3 May) ===
| # | Stage Name | Song | Identity | Result |
|---|---|---|---|---|
| 1 | Aries | "Chop Suey!" by System of a Down | undisclosed | SAFE |
| 2 | Flower | "Aed" by Arvo Pärt | undisclosed | SAFE |
| 3 | Insect | "My Way" by Frank Sinatra | Mart Mardisalu | THIRD |
Sing-Off
| 1 | Aries | "für Oksana" by Nublu | Stefan Airapetjan | WINNER |
| 2 | Flower | "Kuninganna" by Fix | Kaire Vilgats | RUNNER-UP |

== Season 2 ==
Season 2 was confirmed on 17 August 2020 and started to be taped in the same week. The first episode was aired on 18 October 2020. An additional programme called Maski taga (Behind the Mask) was launched that featured interviews with unmasked contestants and panelists as well as further speculations and theories about the main show.

=== Celebrities ===
| Stage name | Celebrity | Notability | Episodes | | | | | | | |
| Stage name | Celebrity | Notability | 1 | 2 | 3 | 4 | 5 | 6 | 7 | 8 |
|---|---|---|---|---|---|---|---|---|---|---|
| Polaarhunt ("Arctic Wolf") | Mikk Saar | Singer | WIN | | WIN | | WIN | WIN | WIN | WINNER |
| Fööniks ("Phoenix") | Elina Nechayeva | Singer | WIN | | | WIN | RISK | WIN | WIN | RUNNER-UP |
| Draakon ("Dragon") | Henessi Schmidt | Actress | | WIN | WIN | | WIN | RISK | RISK | THIRD |
| Kärbseseen ("Fly Agaric") | Luisa Rõivas | Singer | | WIN | | WIN | RISK | RISK | OUT | |
| Sebra ("Zebra") | Tomi Rahula | Musician | | RISK | RISK | | WIN | OUT | | |
| Ilves ("Lynx") | Elina Born | Singer | RISK | | | RISK | OUT | | | |
| Saturn | Sven Mikser | Politician | RISK | | | OUT | | | | |
| Liblikas ("Butterfly") | Liis Lusmägi | Journalist | | RISK | OUT | | | | | |
| Tulnukas ("Alien") | Peeter Oja | Actor | | OUT | | | | | | |
| Kalevipoeg | Joel Ostrat | Chef | OUT | | | | | | | |

The masked singer won their face-off and remained in the competition.
The masked singer lost their face-off and was in the bottom three/two, but was not eliminated.
The masked singer was safe from elimination.
The masked singer was eliminated from the competition and unmasked upon their elimination.
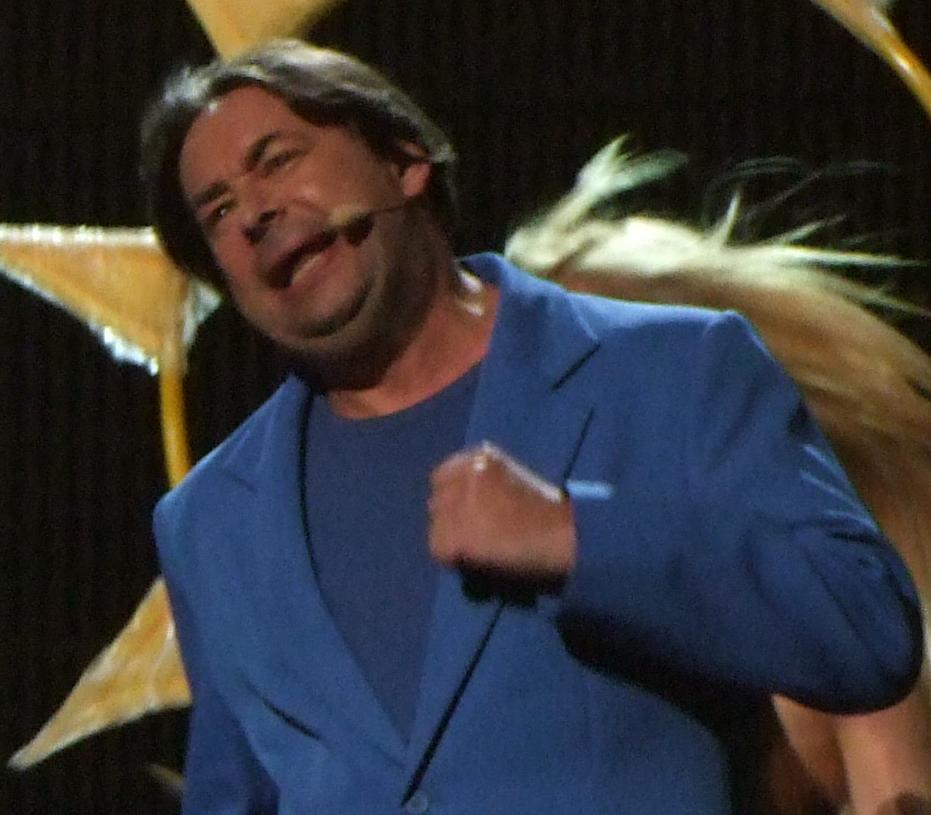
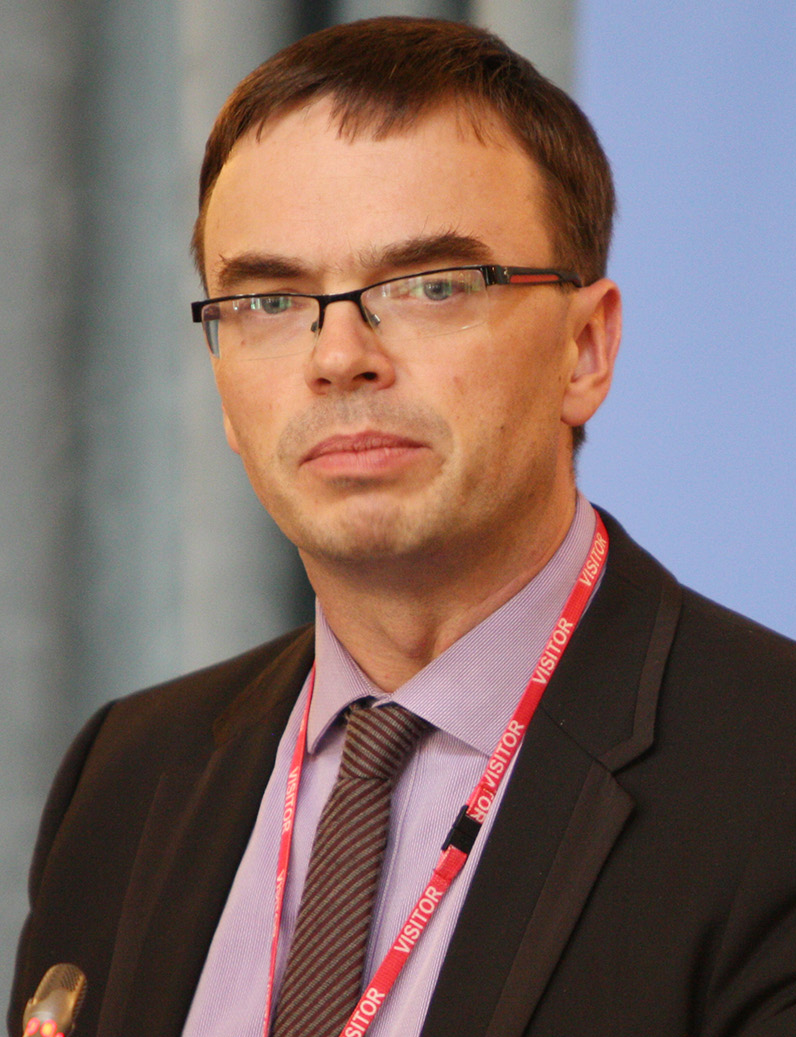
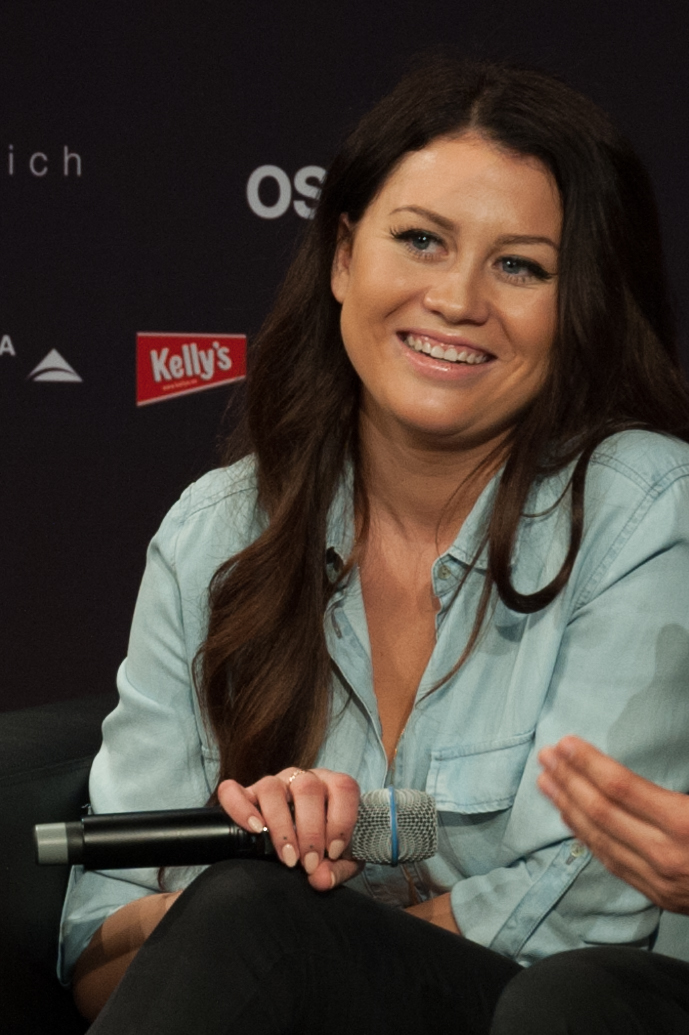
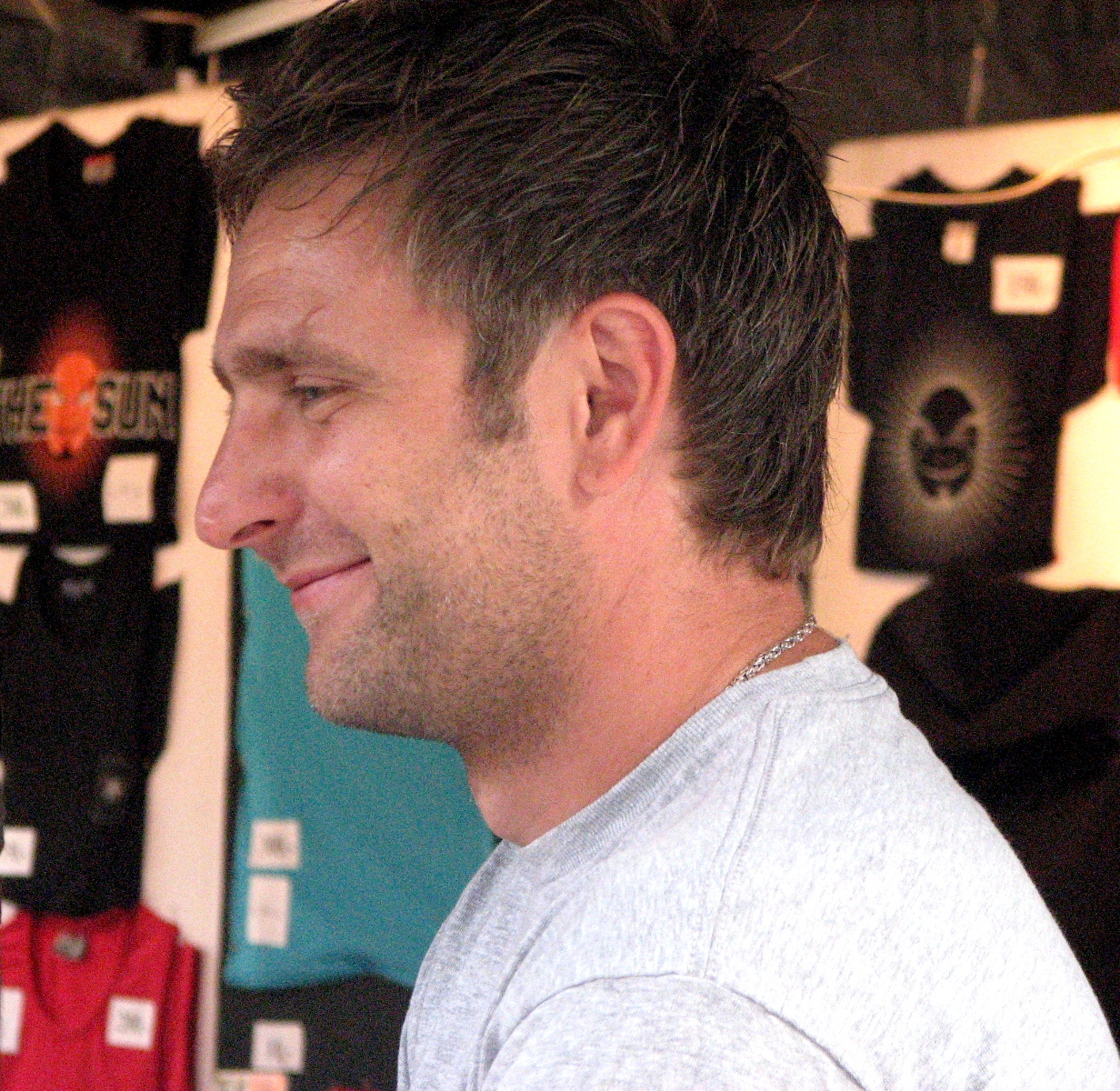
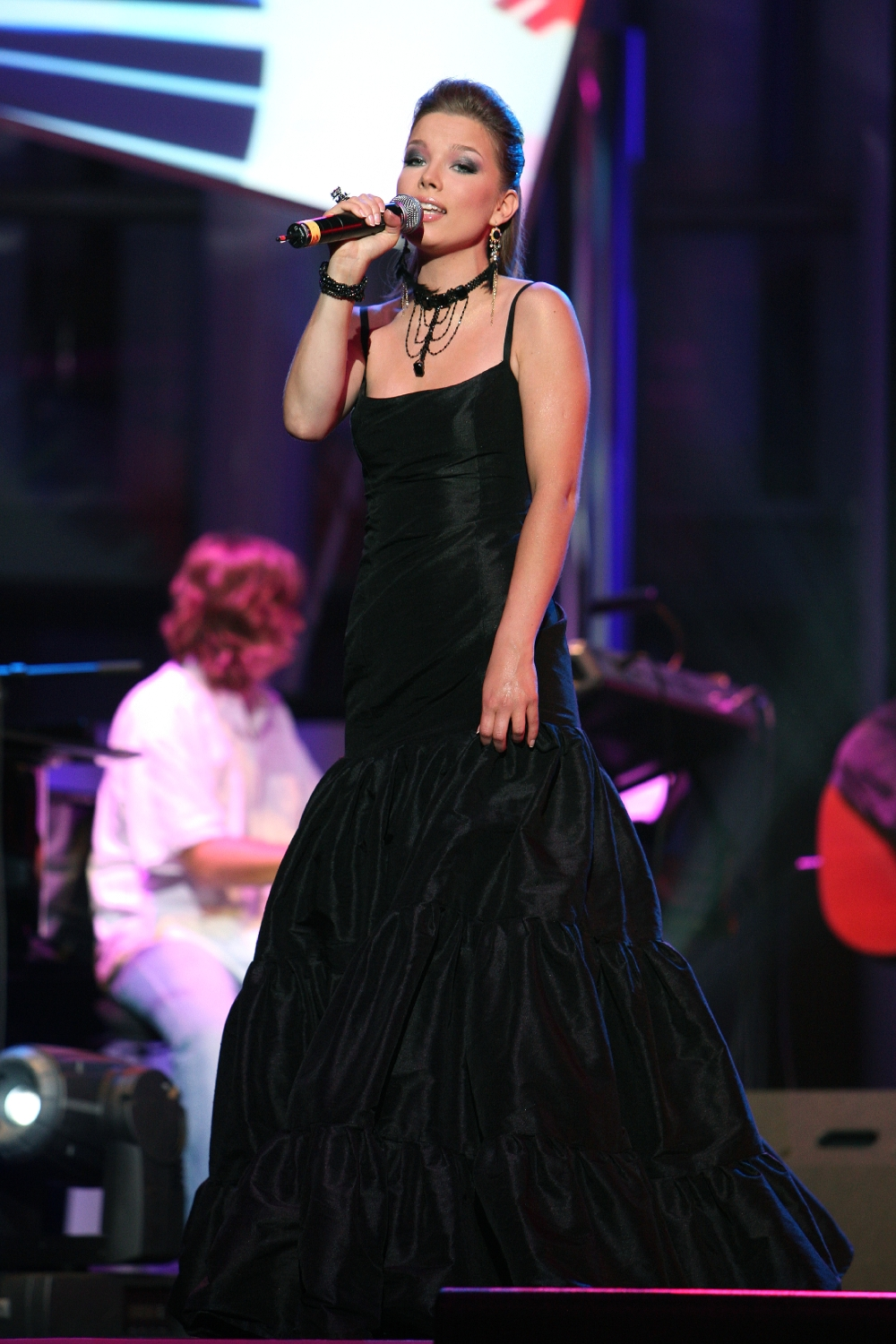
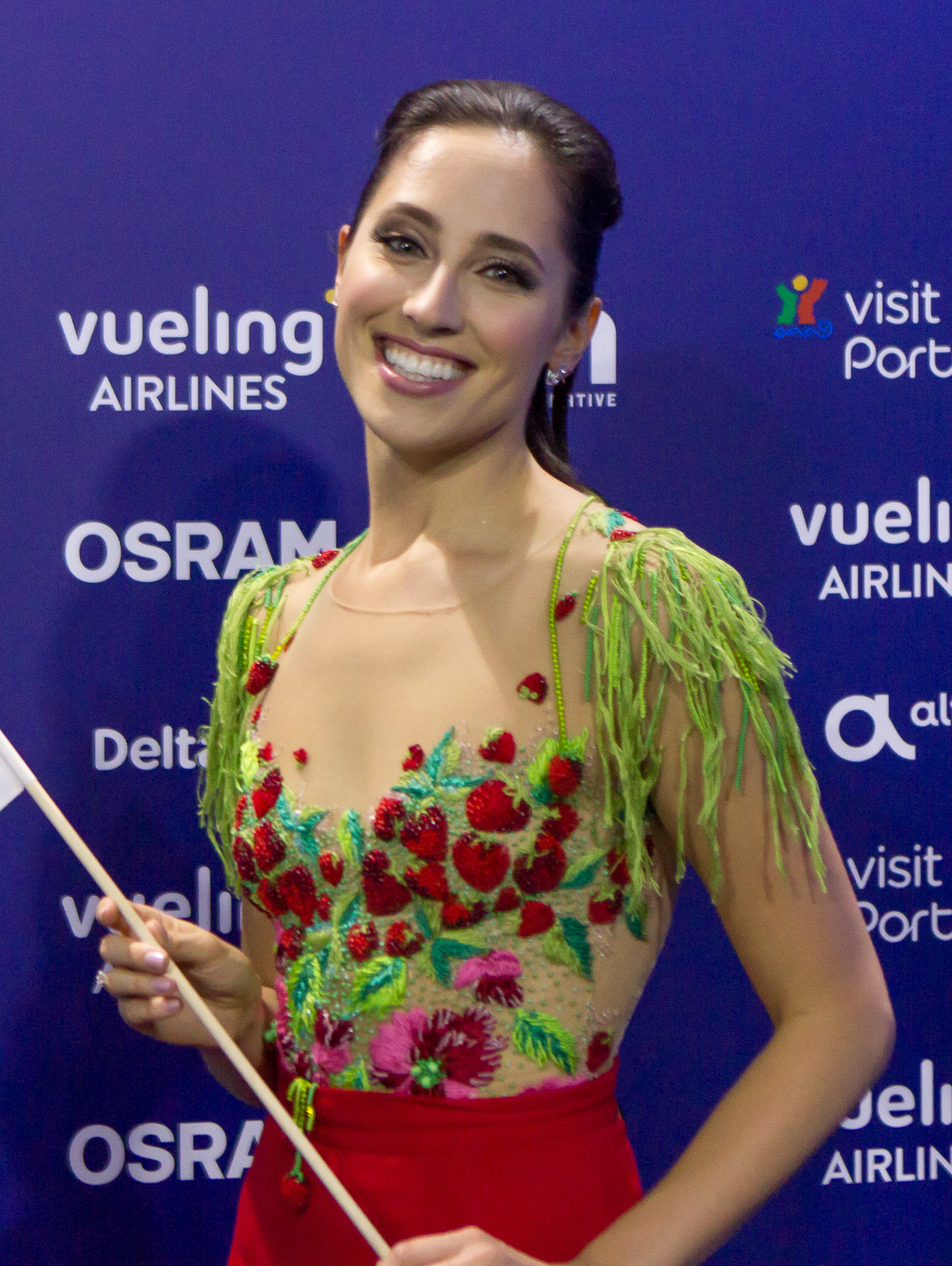
Some of the celebrities who competed in the second season of Maskis Laulja, pictured in order of elimination (l-r):
Peeter Oja ("Alien"), Sven Mikser ("Saturn"), Elina Born ("Lynx"), Tomi Rahula ("Zebra"), Luisa Rõivas ("Fly Agaric"), Elina Nechayeva ("Phoenix").

== Episodes ==
=== Episode 1 (18 October) ===
| # | Stage Name | Song | Identity | Result |
|---|---|---|---|---|
| 1 | Kalevipoeg | "Uncle John" by Daniel Lévi | RISK | |
| 2 | Phoenix | "Why Don't You Do Right?" by Benny Goodman and Peggy Lee | WIN | |
| 3 | Lynx | "Dance Monkey" by Tones and I | RISK | |
| 4 | Saturn | "Et sa teaks" by Smilers | RISK | |
| 5 | Arctic Wolf | "The Sound of Silence" by Simon & Garfunkel | WIN | |
Sing-Off
| 1 | Kalevipoeg | "Käime katuseid mööda" by Smilers | Joel Ostrat | OUT |
| 2 | Lynx | "Phantom of the Opera" by Andrew Lloyd Webber | undisclosed | SAFE |
| 3 | Saturn | "Budapest" by George Ezra | undisclosed | SAFE |

=== Episode 2 (25 October) ===
| # | Stage Name | Song | Identity | Result |
|---|---|---|---|---|
| 1 | Zebra | "Savage Love" by Jason Derulo | RISK | |
| 2 | Fly Agaric | "Frozen" by Madonna | WIN | |
| 3 | Dragon | "Ma ei maga, ma ei söö" by Boris Björn Sagger and Siiri Sisask | WIN | |
| 4 | Alien | "Mama, I'm Coming Home" by Ozzy Osbourne | RISK | |
| 5 | Butterfly | "Kauges külas" by Curly Strings | RISK | |
Sing-Off
| 1 | Zebra | "Thunder" by Imagine Dragons | undisclosed | SAFE |
| 2 | Alien | "Crazy" by Patsy Cline | Peeter Oja | OUT |
| 3 | Butterfly | "Uptown Funk" by Mark Ronson feat. Bruno Mars | undisclosed | SAFE |

=== Episode 3 (1 November) ===
| # | Stage Name | Song | Identity | Result |
|---|---|---|---|---|
| 1 | Arctic Wolf | "Bang Bang" by Jessie J feat Ariana Grande and Nicki Minaj | WIN | |
| 2 | Butterfly | "Tulen saarelt" by Ele Kõlar | RISK | |
| 3 | Dragon | "Wuthering Heights" by Kate Bush | WIN | |
| 4 | Zebra | "'O sole mio" by Luciano Pavarotti | RISK | |
Sing-Off
| 1 | Butterfly | "Everything I Wanted" by Billie Eilish | Liis Lusmägi | OUT |
| 2 | Zebra | "Should I Stay or Should I Go" by The Clash | undisclosed | SAFE |

=== Episode 4 (8 November) ===
| # | Stage Name | Song | Identity | Result |
|---|---|---|---|---|
| 1 | Phoenix | "Kehakeel" by Liis Lemsalu | WIN | |
| 2 | Saturn | "Bonfire Heart" by James Blunt | RISK | |
| 3 | Lynx | "Jolene" by Dolly Parton | RISK | |
| 4 | Fly Agaric | "La forza" by Elina Nechayeva | WIN | |
Sing-Off
| 1 | Saturn | "Ring of Fire" by Johnny Cash | Sven Mikser | OUT |
| 2 | Lynx | "On läinud aastad" by Mahavok | undisclosed | SAFE |

=== Episode 5 (15 November) ===
| # | Stage Name | Song | Identity | Result |
|---|---|---|---|---|
| 1 | Lynx | "Rain On Me" by Ariana Grande and Lady Gaga | RISK | |
| 2 | Arctic Wolf | "Armastan vaid sind" by Rock Hotel | WIN | |
| 3 | Fly Agaric | "River Deep, Mountain High" by Tina Turner | RISK | |
| 4 | Dragon | "Toxic" by Britney Spears | WIN | |
| 5 | Phoenix | "Someone Like You" by Adele | RISK | |
| 6 | Zebra | "Du Hast" by Rammstein | WIN | |
Sing-Off
| 1 | Lynx | "I Will Always Love You" by Whitney Houston | Elina Born | OUT |
| 2 | Fly Agaric | "Ükskord" by Eda-Ines Etti | undisclosed | SAFE |
| 3 | Phoenix | "Mambo Italiano" by Sophia Loren | undisclosed | SAFE |

=== Episode 6 (22 November) ===
| # | Stage Name | Song | Identity | Result |
|---|---|---|---|---|
| 1 | Arctic Wolf | "Blinding Lights" by The Weeknd | WIN | |
| 2 | Dragon | "What's Up?" by 4 Non Blondes | RISK | |
| 3 | Zebra | "(Ei ole) aluspükse" by 5MIINUST feat. Nublu | RISK | |
| 4 | Fly Agaric | "Symphony" by Clean Bandit | RISK | |
| 5 | Phoenix | "Non, je ne regrette rien" by Édith Piaf | WIN | |
Sing-Off
| 1 | Dragon | "Without Me" by Eminem | undisclosed | SAFE |
| 2 | Zebra | "Ai se eu te pego" by Michel Teló | Tomi Rahula | OUT |
| 3 | Fly Agaric | "Nädalalõpp" by Koit Toome | undisclosed | SAFE |

=== Episode 7 (29 November) ===
In this episode, the contestants performed duets with famous singers.

| # | Stage Name and Duet Partner | Song | Identity | Result |
|---|---|---|---|---|
| 1 | Phoenix and Mikk Saar | "Beauty and the Beast" by Céline Dion and Peabo Bryson | WIN | |
| 2 | Dragon and Mart Müürisepp | "Kosmos-maa" by Anu Anton | RISK | |
| 3 | Fly Agaric and Stefan Airapetjan | "Shallow" by Lady Gaga and Bradley Cooper | RISK | |
| 4 | Arctic Wolf and Kaire Vilgats and Dagmar Oja | "Let Me Entertain You" By Robbie Williams | WIN | |
Sing-Off
| 1 | Dragon | "Hallelujah" by Leonard Cohen | undisclosed | SAFE |
| 2 | Fly Agaric | "Wrecking Ball" by Miley Cyrus | Luisa Rõivas | OUT |

=== Episode 8 - Finale (6 December) ===
| # | Stage Name | Song | Identity | Result |
|---|---|---|---|---|
| 1 | Dragon | "Sound of Music Medley" by Peter Hollens | Henessi Schmidt | THIRD |
| 2 | Phoenix | "Never Enough" by Loren Allred | undisclosed | SAFE |
| 3 | Arctic Wolf | "Born This Way" by Lady Gaga | undisclosed | SAFE |
Sing-Off
| 1 | Phoenix | "Non, je ne regrette rien" by Édith Piaf | Elina Nechayeva | RUNNER-UP |
| 2 | Arctic Wolf | "The Sound of Silence" by Simon & Garfunkel | Mikk Saar | WINNER |

== Season 3 ==
=== Celebrities ===
| Stage name | Celebrity | Notability | Episodes | | | | | | | |
| Stage name | Celebrity | Notability | 1 | 2 | 3 | 4 | 5 | 6 | 7 | 8 |
|---|---|---|---|---|---|---|---|---|---|---|
| Sinine Ahv ("Blue Monkey") | Franz Malmsten | Actor | | WIN | | WIN | WIN | WIN | WIN | WINNER |
| Malekuningas ("Chess King") | Hanno Pevkur | Politician | WIN | | | WIN | WIN | RISK | RISK | RUNNER-UP |
| Hirv ("Deer") | Marta Laan | Actress | | RISK | RISK | | WIN | RISK | WIN | THIRD |
| Jänes ("Rabbit") | Ithaka Maria | Singer | WIN | | | RISK | RISK | WIN | OUT | |
| Ukssarvik ("Unicorn") | Ott Lepland | Singer | | WIN | WIN | | RISK | OUT | | |
| Kaheksajalg ("Octopus") | Silvia Ilves | Cellist | | RISK | WIN | | OUT | | | |
| Ööliblikas ("Night Butterfly") | Katrin Karisma | Actress | RISK | | | OUT | | | | |
| Lumehelbeke ("Snowflake") | Sissi Nylia Benita | Singer | RISK | | OUT | | | | | |
| Tort ("Cake") | Ott Kiivikas | Bodybuilder | | OUT | | | | | | |
| Ronk ("Raven") | Hannes Võrno | Comedian | OUT | | | | | | | |

== Episodes ==
=== Episode 1 (13 March) ===
| # | Stage Name | Song | Result | |
|---|---|---|---|---|
| 1 | Rabbit | "Victorious" by Panic! at the Disco | WIN | |
| 2 | Raven | "Over My Shoulder" by Mike + The Mechanics | RISK | |
| 3 | Night Butterfly | "Käime katuseid mööda" by Smilers | RISK | |
| 4 | Snowflake | "Poker Face" by Lady Gaga | RISK | |
| 5 | Chess King | "I Want It All" by Queen | WIN | |
Sing-Off
| 1 | Raven | "Aknal" by Voldemar Kuslap | Hannes Võrno | OUT |
| 2 | Night Butterfly | "Всё могут короли" by Alla Pugacheva | undisclosed | SAFE |
| 3 | Snowflake | "Issues" by Julia Michaels | undisclosed | SAFE |

=== Episode 2 (20 March) ===
| # | Stage Name | Song | Result | |
|---|---|---|---|---|
| 1 | Deer | "Million Reasons" by Lady Gaga | RISK | |
| 2 | Blue Monkey | "Bella Ciao" by Manu Pilas | WIN | |
| 3 | Octopus | "Club Kung Fu" by Vanilla Ninja | RISK | |
| 4 | Cake | "Rock'n'rolli lapsed" by Karavan | RISK | |
| 5 | Unicorn | "Stayin' Alive" by Bee Gees | WIN | |
Sing-Off
| 1 | Deer | "Linnuteid" by Elina Born | undisclosed | SAFE |
| 2 | Octopus | "Joe le taxi" by Vanessa Paradis | undisclosed | SAFE |
| 3 | Cake | "Siis veel ei tundnud sind" by 2 Quick Start | Ott Kiivikas | OUT |

=== Episode 3 (27 March) ===
| # | Stage Name | Song | Result | |
|---|---|---|---|---|
| 1 | Snowflake | "Bad Guy" by Billie Eilish | RISK | |
| 2 | Unicorn | "Mis nüüd saab" by Andrei Zevakin feat. Grete Paia | WIN | |
| 3 | Deer | "I Dreamed a Dream" by Rose Laurens | RISK | |
| 4 | Octopus | "Girls Just Want to Have Fun" by Cyndi Lauper | WIN | |
Sing-Off
| 1 | Deer | "Because the Night" by Patti Smith | undisclosed | SAFE |
| 2 | Snowflake | "Dancing Lasha Tumbai" by Verka Serduchka | Sissi Nylia Benita | OUT |

=== Episode 4 (3 April) ===
| # | Stage Name | Song | Result | |
|---|---|---|---|---|
| 1 | Blue Monkey | "Ice Ice Baby" by Vanilla Ice | WIN | |
| 2 | Rabbit | "Löö kinni musta mure uks" by Laimi Sprogis | RISK | |
| 3 | Night Butterfly | "Take Me Home, Country Roads" by John Denver | RISK | |
| 4 | Chess King | "La Bamba" by Ritchie Valens | WIN | |
Sing-Off
| 1 | Night Butterfly | "Lootus" by Janika Sillamaa | Katrin Karisma | OUT |
| 2 | Rabbit | "Hava Nagila" | undisclosed | SAFE |

=== Episode 5 (10 April) ===
| # | Stage Name | Song | Result | |
|---|---|---|---|---|
| 1 | Unicorn | "A Little Less Conversation" by Elvis Presley | RISK | |
| 2 | Blue Monkey | "Shotgun" by George Ezra | WIN | |
| 3 | Rabbit | "Next to Me" by Emeli Sandé | RISK | |
| 4 | Deer | "Levitating" by Dua Lipa | WIN | |
| 5 | Octopus | "On the Floor" by Jennifer Lopez feat. Pitbull | RISK | |
| 6 | Chess King | "Drunken Sailor" | WIN | |
Sing-Off
| 1 | Unicorn | "Rooftop" by NOËP | undisclosed | SAFE |
| 2 | Rabbit | "Smells Like Teen Spirit" by Malia J | undisclosed | SAFE |
| 3 | Octopus | "Back in Black" by AC/DC | Silvia Ilves | OUT |

=== Episode 6 (17 April) ===
| # | Stage Name | Song | Result | |
|---|---|---|---|---|
| 1 | Blue Monkey | "Bang Bang" by will.i.am | WIN | |
| 2 | Chess King | "Rikas ja vaene" by Zetod | RISK | |
| 3 | Deer | "I'm So Excited" by The Pointer Sisters | RISK | |
| 4 | Unicorn | "Jump Around" by House of Pain | RISK | |
| 5 | Rabbit | "Grown Woman" by Kelly Rowland | WIN | |
Sing-Off
| 1 | Chess King | "Oma laulu ei leia ma üles" by Metsatöll | undisclosed | SAFE |
| 2 | Deer | "Valu laul" by Hedvig Hanson | undisclosed | SAFE |
| 3 | Unicorn | "Tühjad pihud" by Gunnar Graps | Ott Lepland | OUT |

=== Episode 7 (24 April) ===
| # | Stage Name | Song | Result | |
|---|---|---|---|---|
| 1 | Rabbit | "Macarena" by Los del Río | RISK | |
| 2 | Blue Monkey | "Aga siis" by Jüri Pootsmann | WIN | |
| 3 | Chess King | "Cotton Eye Joe" by Rednex | RISK | |
| 4 | Deer | "Milline Päev" by Lumevärv | WIN | |
Sing-Off
| 1 | Chess King | "Pistoda Laul" by Viimne Reliikvia | undisclosed | SAFE |
| 2 | Rabbit | "Dernière danse" by Indila | Ithaka Maria | OUT |

=== Episode 8 (8 May) ===
| # | Stage Name | Song | Identity | Result |
|---|---|---|---|---|
| 1 | Blue Monkey | "?mis sa tegid" by 5MIINUST | undisclosed | SAFE |
| 2 | Chess King | "Браття Українці" by Shablya | undisclosed | SAFE |
| 3 | Deer | "Iseendale" by Ines | Marta Laan | THIRD |
Sing-Off
| 1 | Blue Monkey | "Bella Ciao" by Manu Pilas | Franz Malmsten | WINNER |
| 2 | Chess King | "Drunken Sailor" | Hanno Pevkur | RUNNER-UP |

== Season 4 ==
=== Celebrities ===
| Stage name | Celebrity | Notability | Episodes | | | | | | | |
| Stage name | Celebrity | Notability | 1 | 2 | 3 | 4 | 5 | 6 | 7 | 8 |
|---|---|---|---|---|---|---|---|---|---|---|
| Elevant ("Elephant") | Genka | Rapper | | WIN | | WIN | WIN | RISK | WIN | WINNER |
| Pull ("Bull") (WC) | Orm Oja | Chef | | | | WIN | WIN | WIN | RISK | RUNNER-UP |
| Puuma ("Puma") (WC) | Ant Nurhan | Singer | | | WIN | | WIN | WIN | WIN | THIRD |
| Kiisu ("Kitty") | Nele-Liis Vaiksoo | Singer | WIN | | WIN | | WIN | WIN | OUT | |
| Flamingo | Desiree Mumm | Singer | | WIN | | RISK | RISK | OUT | | |
| Saunaviht ("Sauna Whisk") | Jüri Makarov | Entrepreneur | RISK | | RISK | | OUT | | | |
| Kuningas ("King") | Helle-Moonika Helme | Politician | | RISK | | OUT | | | | |
| Vampiir ("Vampire") | Andrei Zevakin | Singer | WIN | | OUT | | | | | |
| Seebiooper ("Soap Opera") | Karl Madis | Singer | | OUT | | | | | | |
| Triibuline ("Striped") | Katri Teller | Television host | OUT | | | | | | | |

== Episodes ==
=== Episode 1 (24 March) ===
| # | Stage Name | Song | Result | |
|---|---|---|---|---|
| 1 | Sauna Whisk | "Play That Funky Music" by Wild Cherry | RISK | |
| 2 | Kitty | "Wunderbar" by Traffic | WIN | |
| 3 | Striped | "Euphoria" by Loreen | RISK | |
| 4 | Vampire | "(Nendest) narkootikumidest ei tea me (küll) midagi" by 5MIINUST & Puuluup | WIN | |
Sing-Off
| 1 | Sauna Whisk | "Change The World" by Eric Clapton | undisclosed | SAFE |
| 2 | Striped | "Paus" by Liis Lemsalu | Katri Teller | OUT |

=== Episode 2 (31 March) ===
| # | Stage Name | Song | Result | |
|---|---|---|---|---|
| 1 | Soap Opera | "Can't Stop the Feeling" by Justin Timberlake | RISK | |
| 2 | Flamingo | "Rändajad" by Urban Symphony | WIN | |
| 3 | King | "Oma laulu ei leia ma üles" by Metsatöll | RISK | |
| 4 | Elephant | "Sonne" by Rammstein | WIN | |
Sing-Off
| 1 | Soap Opera | "Wicked Game" by Chris Isaak | Karl Madis | OUT |
| 2 | King | "I Will Survive" by Gloria Gaynor | undisclosed | SAFE |

=== Episode 3 (7 April) ===
| # | Stage Name | Song | Result | |
|---|---|---|---|---|
| 1 | Kitty | "Pass-pass" by Trad.Attack! | WIN | |
| 2 | Vampire | "What I've Done" by Linkin Park | RISK | |
| 3 | Sauna Whisk | "Unustuse jõel" by Jaak Joala | RISK | |
| Wildcard | Puma | "Never Gonna Give You Up" by Rick Astley | WIN | |
Sing-Off
| 1 | Vampire | "Livin' la Vida Loca" by Ricky Martin | Andrei Zevakin | OUT |
| 2 | Sauna Whisk | "You Raise Me Up" by Secret Garden | undisclosed | SAFE |

=== Episode 4 (14 April) ===
| # | Stage Name | Song | Result | |
|---|---|---|---|---|
| 1 | Flamingo | "The Edge of Glory" by Lady Gaga | RISK | |
| 2 | Elephant | "Kiss Kiss" by Tarkan | WIN | |
| 3 | King | "Me kõik jääme vanaks" by Getter Jaani feat. Mihkel Raud | RISK | |
| Wildcard | Bull | "Born to Be Wild" by Steppenwolf | WIN | |
Sing-Off
| 1 | Flamingo | "Con te partirò" by Andrea Bocelli | undisclosed | SAFE |
| 2 | King | "Mamma Maria" by Ricchi e Poveri | Helle-Moonika Helme | OUT |

=== Episode 5 (21 April) ===
| # | Stage Name | Song | Result | |
|---|---|---|---|---|
| 1 | Flamingo | "Don't Stop Me Now" by Queen | RISK | |
| 2 | Elephant | "Levoton Tuhkimo" by Dingo | WIN | |
| 3 | Puma | "Your Man" by Josh Turner | WIN | |
| 4 | Kitty | "Welcome to Estonia" by Tanel Padar & The Sun | WIN | |
| 5 | Sauna Whisk | "Celebration" by Kool & the Gang | RISK | |
| 6 | Bull | "I Wanna Be Your Dog" by The Stooges | WIN | |
Sing-Off
| 1 | Flamingo | "Nagu merelaine" by Silvi Vrait | undisclosed | SAFE |
| 2 | Sauna Whisk | "Guantanamera" | Jüri Makarov | OUT |

=== Episode 6 (28 April) ===
| # | Stage Name | Song | Result | |
|---|---|---|---|---|
| 1 | Elephant | "Zitti e buoni" by Måneskin | RISK | |
| 2 | Puma | "Ühega miljoneist" by 2 Quick Start | WIN | |
| 3 | Bull | "You Should Be Dancing" by Bee Gees | WIN | |
| 4 | Flamingo | "Rap God" by Eminem | RISK | |
| 5 | Kitty | "Ooh Aah... Just a Little Bit" by Gina G | WIN | |
Sing-Off
| 1 | Elephant | "Ai Se Eu Te Pego" by Michel Teló | undisclosed | SAFE |
| 2 | Flamingo | "I Will Always Love You" by Whitney Houston | Desiree Mumm | OUT |

=== Episode 7 (5 May) ===
| # | Stage Name | Song | Result | |
|---|---|---|---|---|
| 1 | Puma | "Cha Cha Cha" by Käärijä | WIN | |
| 2 | Bull | "Seven Nation Army" by The White Stripes | RISK | |
| 3 | Kitty | "Valged ööd" by Getter Jaani & Koit Toome | RISK | |
| 4 | Elephant | "Papaoutai" by Stromae | WIN | |
Sing-Off
| 1 | Bull | "Nii sind ootan" by Smilers | undisclosed | SAFE |
| 2 | Kitty | "Summertime" by Ella Fitzgerald & Louis Armstrong | Nele-Liis Vaiksoo | OUT |

=== Episode 8 (12 May) ===
| # | Stage Name | Song | Identity | Result |
|---|---|---|---|---|
| 1 | Bull | "Canción del Mariachi" by Antonio Banderas & Los Lobos | undisclosed | SAFE |
| 2 | Elephant | "Baddadan" by Chase & Status & Bou | undisclosed | SAFE |
| 3 | Puma | "Segased lood" by Karl-Erik Taukar | Ant Nurhan | THIRD |
Sing-Off
| 1 | Bull | "Born to Be Wild" by Steppenwolf | Orm Oja | RUNNER-UP |
| 2 | Elephant | "Zitti e buoni" by Måneskin | Genka | WINNER |

== Season 5 ==
The fifth season was announced on 23 February 2025 and started airing on 16 March 2025 and concluded on 4 May 2025. It featured 10 celebrities from the field of entertainment, music, film and theatre, journalism and politics.

=== Celebrities ===
| Stage name | Celebrity | Notability | Episodes | | | | | | | |
| Stage name | Celebrity | Notability | 1 | 2 | 3 | 4 | 5 | 6 | 7 | 8 |
|---|---|---|---|---|---|---|---|---|---|---|
| Mürakaru ("Noise Bear") | Saara Pius | Actress/singer | WIN | | WIN | | WIN | WIN | WIN | WINNER |
| Karvakoll ("Fur Coat") | Liis Lemsalu | Singer | | RISK | | WIN | WIN | WIN | RISK | RUNNER-UP |
| Rebane ("Fox") | Karl Robert Saaremäe | Actor | | WIN | RISK | | WIN | RISK | WIN | THIRD |
| Sfinks ("Sphinx") | Kirsti Timmer | Journalist | | WIN | | WIN | WIN | WIN | OUT | |
| Diskodiiva ("Disco Diva") | Jüri Pootsmann | Singer | RISK | | | RISK | RISK | OUT | | |
| Pallimeri ("Ball Pit") (WC) | Sepo Seeman | Actor | | | WIN | | OUT | | | |
| Pärlikarp ("Pearl Shell") (WC) | Merle Randma-Aru | TV personality | | | | OUT | | | | |
| Süda ("Heart") | Epp Kärsin | TV personality | WIN | | OUT | | | | | |
| Vana Toomas ("Old Thomas") | Jaak Madison | Politician | | OUT | | | | | | |
| Jalgpall ("Football") | Taavi Libe | Journalist | OUT | | | | | | | |

The masked singer won their face-off and remained in the competition.
The masked singer lost their face-off and was in the bottom three/two, but was not eliminated.
The masked singer was safe from elimination.
The masked singer was eliminated from the competition and unmasked upon their elimination.

== Episodes ==
=== Episode 1 (16 March) ===
| # | Stage Name | Song | Result | |
|---|---|---|---|---|
| 1 | Noise Bear | "push it" by Nublu feat. Maria Kallastu | WIN | |
| 2 | Disco Diva | "Yes Sir, I Can Boogie" by Baccara | RISK | |
| 3 | Football | "Rannalinna Restoranis" by Kukerpillid | RISK | |
| 4 | Heart | "La Isla Bonita" by Madonna | WIN | |
Sing-Off
| 1 | Disco Diva | "La Voix" by Malena Ernman | undisclosed | SAFE |
| 2 | Football | "Ainult unustamiseks" by Smilers | Taavi Libe | OUT |

=== Episode 2 (23 March) ===
| # | Stage Name | Song | Result | |
|---|---|---|---|---|
| 1 | Fox | "The Fox (What Does the Fox Say?)" by Ylvis | WIN | |
| 2 | Fur Coat | "The Code" by Nemo | RISK | |
| 3 | Old Thomas | "Võõra linna tuled" by Mart Helme & Hübriid | RISK | |
| 4 | Sphinx | "Don't Be So Shy" by Imany | WIN | |
Sing-Off
| 1 | Fur Coat | "La vie en rose" by Édith Piaf | undisclosed | SAFE |
| 2 | Old Thomas | "Amerika" by Rammstein | Jaak Madison | OUT |

=== Episode 3 (30 March) ===
| # | Stage Name | Song | Result | |
|---|---|---|---|---|
| 1 | Heart | "No Limit" by 2 Unlimited | RISK | |
| 2 | Noise Bear | "Hooked on a Feeling" by Blue Swede | WIN | |
| 3 | Fox | "L.O.V.E." by Nat King Cole | RISK | |
| Wildcard | Ball Pit | "Tequila" by The Champs | WIN | |
Sing-Off
| 1 | Heart | "Summertime Sadness" by Lana Del Rey | Epp Kärsin | OUT |
| 2 | Fox | "See viis" by Jam | undisclosed | SAFE |

=== Episode 4 (30 March) ===
| # | Stage Name | Song | Result | |
|---|---|---|---|---|
| 1 | Fur Coat | "Sex Bomb" by Tom Jones and Mousse T. | WIN | |
| 2 | Disco Diva | "Meiecundimees üks Korsakov läks eile Lätti" by Winny Puhh | RISK | |
| Wildcard | Pearl Shell | "Speak Softly Love (Parla Piu Piano)" by Nikolas Lappas | RISK | |
| 3 | Sphinx | "Hopa'pa-rei!" by Ithaka Maria | WIN | |
Sing-Off
| 1 | Disco Diva | "Can't Get You Out Of My Head" by Kylie Minogue | undisclosed | SAFE |
| 2 | Pearl Shell | "Amado Mio" by Pink Martini ft. China Forbes | Merle Randma-Aru | OUT |

=== Episode 5 (13 April) ===
| # | Stage Name | Song | Result | |
|---|---|---|---|---|
| 1 | Fur Coat | "Aeg ei peatu" by Apelsin | WIN | |
| 2 | Ball Pit | "Da Da Da" by Trio | RISK | |
| 3 | Fox | "As It Was" by Harry Styles | WIN | |
| 4 | Disco Diva | "Nii kuum" by Nexus | RISK | |
| 5 | Sphinx | "Sweet Dreams" by Marilyn Manson | WIN | |
| 6 | Noise Bear | "Sidur pidur gaas gaas" by 42GO | WIN | |
Sing-Off
| 1 | Ball Pit | "Around the World" by Daft Punk | Sepo Seeman | OUT |
| 2 | Disco Diva | "Rulli Rulli Rulli" by Öed | undisclosed | SAFE |

=== Episode 6 (20 April) ===
| # | Stage Name | Song | Result | |
|---|---|---|---|---|
| 1 | Sphinx | "Hea tuju laul" by Anne Veski | WIN | |
| 2 | Noise Bear | "Uptown Funk" by Bruno Mars | WIN | |
| 3 | Fox | "Counting Stars" by OneRepublic | RISK | |
| 4 | Fur Coat | "Aluspükse" by 5miinust & Nublu | WIN | |
| 5 | Disco Diva | "Tragedy" by Bee Gees | RISK | |
Sing-Off
| 1 | Fox | "Angel" by Sarah McLachlan | undisclosed | SAFE |
| 2 | Disco Diva | "Espresso" by Sabrina Carpenter | Jüri Pootsmann | OUT |

=== Episode 7 (27 April) ===
| # | Stage Name | Song | Duetpartner | Result | |
|---|---|---|---|---|---|
| 1 | Fox | "APT." by Bruno Mars & Rosé | Alika Milova | WIN | |
| 2 | Fur Coat | "Doomino" by Liis Lemsalu & Stefan | Stefan | RISK | |
| 3 | Sphinx | "Valged ööd" by Getter Jaani & Koit Toome | Koit Toome | RISK | |
| 4 | Noise Bear | "I'll Be There for You" by The Rembrandts | INGER | WIN | |
Sing-Off
| 1 | Fur Coat | "These Boots Are Made for Walking" by Nancy Sinatra | | undisclosed | SAFE |
| 2 | Sphinx | "Ma Ei Maga, Ma Ei Söö" by Boris Björn Bagger & Siiri Sisask | | Kirsti Timmer | OUT |

=== Episode 8 (4 May) ===
| # | Stage Name | Song | Identity | Result |
|---|---|---|---|---|
| 1 | Fox | "Heart of Glass" by Blondie | Karl Robert Saaremäe | THIRD |
| 2 | Noise Bear | "I Was Made for Lovin' You" by Kiss | undisclosed | SAFE |
| 3 | Fur Coat | "GoldenEye" by Tina Turner | undisclosed | SAFE |
Sing-Off
| 1 | Noise Bear | "push it" by Nublu feat. Maria Kallastu | Saara Pius | WINNER |
| 2 | Fur Coat | "Aeg ei peatu" by Apelsin | Liis Lemsalu | RUNNER-UP |
