= Nexus =

Nexus is a Latin word for connection, usually where multiple elements meet. It may refer to:

== Arts, entertainment, and media ==
=== Fictional entities ===
- Nexus, a common name for a hub area in Yume Nikki and the like
- Nexus, a fictional place in the TV series Charmed (broadcast 1998–2006)
- Nexus, a large, insect-like Necromorph in the game Dead Space 3
- Nexus, a series of androids in the book Do Androids Dream of Electric Sheep? (1968) by Philip K. Dick
  - Nexus, the corresponding series of replicants in the film adaptation Blade Runner (1982)
- Nexus, a structure at the starting point of each team in League of Legends that the other team must destroy in order to win
- Nexus, the multiplayer meeting platform in the game No Man's Sky in the form of a space station
- Multiversal Nexus, the center of the DC Multiverse
- Planet Nexus, the main setting for the MMORPG WildStar
- The Nexus, the name of the setting of Heroes of the Storm
- The Nexus, a central hub used to bind together various worlds in the game Demon's Souls
- The Nexus, a communications complex in Quake 4
- The Nexus, a safe haven area in Realm of the Mad God
- The Nexus, the central plot element in the 1994 film Star Trek Generations
- The Nexus, a space station in the game Mass Effect: Andromeda
- Ultraman Nexus, the eponymous alien superhero broadcast 2004–2005
- The Nexus, a place connecting multiple realms in The Death Gate Cycle

=== Gaming ===
- Nexus, the brand of the Nexus Mods online modding community
- Dragonlance Nexus, a fansite created in 1996 as "Dragon Realm"
- Nexus: The Jupiter Incident, a 2004 science fiction themed real-time tactics computer game
- Nexus: The Kingdom of the Winds, a 1996 Pay to Play MMORPG
- Ratchet & Clank: Into the Nexus, a platform game developed by Insomniac Games, also known as Ratchet & Clank: Nexus
- Nexus, a digital platform for various tabletop role-playing game tools created by Demiplane

=== Literature ===
- Nexus (comics), an American comic book series by Mike Baron and Steve Rude in 1981
- Nexus (Ramez Naam novel), 2012 cyberpunk thriller novel by Ramez Naam
- Nexus, the final novel published in 1959 in The Rosy Crucifixion trilogy by Henry Miller
- Nexus: A Brief History of Information Networks from the Stone Age to AI, a 2024 non-fiction book by Yuval Noah Harari

=== Music ===
==== Groups and labels ====
- Nexus (Argentine band), a progressive rock band from Argentina
- Nexus (ensemble), a Toronto-based percussion ensemble that performs jazz, world music, and western avant-garde music
- Nexus (Estonian band), an Estonian pop band formed in 2003 which split up in 2006
- Nexus (Greek band), a Greek industrial rock band formed by vocalist/keyboardist Mike Pougounas
- The Nexus, a duo consisting of David Sneddon and James Bauer-Mein
- Nexus Music, a Danish record label and production company

==== Albums ====
- Nexus (Another Level album), 1999
- Nexus (Argent album), 1974
- Nexus (Sarah Fimm album), 2004
- Nexus (Gene Harris album), 1975
- Nexus (Pat Martino album), 2015
- The Nexus (album), by Aramanthe, 2013

==== Songs ====
- "Nexus" (ClariS song)
- "Nexus", from Bethlehem's 1998 album Sardonischer Untergang im Zeichen irreligiöser Darbietung
- "Nexus", from Dan Fogelberg's 1981 album The Innocent Age
- "Nexus", from Opshop's 2004 album You Are Here
- "Nexus", from Silent Planet's 2023 album Superbloom
- "Nexus 4/Shine", a 2008 single by L'Arc-en-Ciel
- "The Nexus", a composition from the Astral Projection 2002 album Amen
- "The Nexus", from Amaranthe's 2013 album The Nexus
- "IV. The Nexus", from Norma Jean's 2016 album Polar Similar

=== Periodicals ===
- Nexus (Australian magazine), a bi-monthly alternative news magazine
- Nexus (literary magazine), a Kenyan literary journal later renamed Busara
- Nexus (student magazine), the weekly students' magazine of the Waikato Students Union at the University of Waikato, New Zealand
- Daily Nexus, the university newspaper for the campus of the University of California, Santa Barbara, US
- The Nexus, the student newspaper of Camosun College, British Columbia, Canada
- The Nexus, neo-Nazi journal run by Kerry Bolton

=== Wrestling ===
- The Nexus (professional wrestling), a defunct professional wrestling stable in the WWE

=== Television channels ===
- Nexus Television, a Bangladeshi television channel

== Brands and enterprises ==
- Nexus (animation studio), a Japanese animation studio
- NEXUS (non-profit), an organization headquartered in Washington, D.C.
- Nexus Audio Recording Studio, in Oakland, California, US
- Nexus Automotive, an importer and manufacturer in Pakistan
- Nexus Studios, an animation and film production company
- Nexus (transport executive), the Passenger Transport Executive for the Tyne and Wear region, England

== Facilities and structures ==
- Nexus (building), a high-rise building in Seattle, Washington, US
- Nexus Place, a building in London owned by Tishman Speyer

== Law and government ==
- NEXUS, a trusted traveler program of Canada and the US
- Nexus, a person under a debt bondage contract called a nexum in ancient Rome
- Nexus, an aspect of state income tax code in the US
- Nexus of contracts, a legal theory
- Nexus clause, provision of the Australian Constitution regarding the composition of parliament

== Philosophy and metaphysics ==
- Nexus (process philosophy), a term coined by Alfred North Whitehead to show the network actual entity from universe
- Causal nexus, chain of causality between two or more processes

== Science and technology ==
=== Biochemistry ===
- 2C-B (or Nexus), a psychedelic drug of the 2C family
- Nexus of a gap junction, a specialized intercellular connection between a multitude of animal cell-types

=== Mobile devices ===
- Google Nexus, a discontinued line of Android devices co-manufactured by Google
  - Nexus One, a 2010 smartphone co-manufactured with HTC
  - Nexus Player, a 2014 digital media player co-manufactured with Asus
  - Nexus Q, a 2012 digital media player

=== Other computing uses ===
- Nexus (data format), a common data format for neutron, X-ray, and muon science
- Nexus (standard), a debugging interface for embedded systems
- Nexus (web browser), the first web browser and editor
- Cisco Nexus switches, modular network switches designed for data centers
- Landmark Nexus, reservoir simulation software
- Nexus file, a widely used file format used in bioinformatics, specifically phylogenetics
- Sonatype Nexus, a software repository manager

== Transportation ==
- Nexus (transport executive) in north-east England
- Gilera Nexus, a motorcycle by Gilera
- Nexus Mustang, a two place homebuilt aircraft
- Shimano Nexus, a brand of bicycle components (geared bicycle hubs)
- General Dynamics Nexus, a reusable rocket concept design created in the 1960s

== Other uses ==
- NEXUS, an annual cultural festival of Sri Venkateswara College
- Water, energy and food security nexus
- Water-energy nexus
- Junction and nexus, a pair of syntactic (and semantic) kinds of relation
- Project Nexus, an international payment system

== See also ==
- Nexis or LexisNexis, a research corporation
- Nexxus, a line of hair care products
- North East Conference on Science and Skepticism (NCSS), run by the New England Skeptical Society
