= Ilz (disambiguation) =

Ilz or ILZ may refer to:

- Ilz, a river in Germany
- ILZ, the IATA code for Žilina Airport
- Ilz, Styria, a town in Austria

== See also ==
- Ilze Hattingh
- Ilze Jaunalksne
