= Agris (given name) =

Latvian masculine given name

- Gender: Male
- Name day: 24 September

Origin
- Region of origin: Latvia

Agris is a Latvian language masculine given name. Individuals bearing the name Agris include:

- Agris Daņiļevičs (born 1963), Latvian choreographer and dance teacher
- Agris Elerts (born 1967), Latvian luger
- Agris Galvanovskis (born 1972), Latvian basketball player
- Agris Kazeļņiks (born 1973), Latvian strongman competitor
- Agris Saviels (born 1982), Latvian ice hockey defenceman
