= A-Eiropa =

Latvian musical group

A-Europa, also known as A-Eiropa, is a Europop band from Latvia. The name A-Eiropa originally stood for "Austrumeiropa" which means "Eastern Europe" in Latvian.

A quite unusual cultural phenomenon is the fact that the group most often releases two versions of songs - one in Latvian and another in Russian (same music, different verses) - or mixes both languages in the same song.

The originator and voice of the group is Artūrs Duboks, who lives in the city of Daugavpils in Latvia.

The group has several times ranked in the top of the hits list for national radio stations and abroad. A-Eiropa's hits have included "Baltās rozes"/"Белые розы" (White roses), "Jūrmala"/"Юрмала" (Jūrmala) and others.
