= Ilze Jaunalksne =

Latvian journalist

- Born: 19 November 1976 (age 49); Jūrmala, Latvian SSR
- Education: University of Latvia
- Occupation: Journalist
- Years active: 1999-present
- Partner: Gundars Rēders
- Children: 2

Ilze Jaunalksne-Rēdere, (born November 19, 1976, in Jūrmala) is a Latvian journalist and an author and anchor of the TV3 Latvia current affairs program Nekā personīga (Nothing Personal) since 2008. From 2005 to 2008 she was an anchor for the Latvian Television channel LTV1 current affairs program De Facto.

In March 2006 on De Facto, she broke the story of Latvian national political leaders from various different parties buying votes. Her reporting on this caused a minister to be forced to resign, and some high-ranking political figures to be indicted. In retaliation, her phone was illegally tapped and transcripts of her conversations released to the media by her opponents in the government.

In response to this invasion of her privacy, Jaunalksne took the government to court for defamation of character, which was the first such case in Latvia. She won, with the Latvian Financial Police being ordered to pay her 100,000 lats ($187,000) in damages for illegally recording her calls and making the transcripts public, and the Finance Ministry and State Revenue Service being found guilty of invading her privacy.

She received a 2007 International Women of Courage award. However, she could not attend the ceremonies since she was about to give birth.

In 2019 Jaunalksne married fellow journalist Gundars Rēders. In 2021 she was awarded the Order of the Three Stars 4th Class.
