= Nexus (Estonian band) =

Estonian pop band

- Origin: Estonia
- Genres: Pop music
- Years active: 2003-2006
- Members: Janne Saar, Merlyn Uusküla, Helen Randmäe

Nexus was an Estonian pop band formed in 2003 that split up in 2006. It consisted of singers Janne Saar, Merlyn Uusküla and Helen Randmäe. The band's first two albums were electronic and up-tempo with a pop sound, while their last album featured rock influences. Their live band featured drummer Boriss Hrebtukov (Borka), bassist Viljar Norman (Villu) and guitarist Kristjan Kaasik (Kaska). In 2023, Nexus performed a reunion concert for their 20th anniversary.

== Discography ==
- Nexus (2003)
- Nexus 2 (2004)
- Nii head tüdrukud ei tee (2005)
- Best of Nexus (2006)
