= Agris Daņiļevičs =

Latvian choreographer and dance teacher

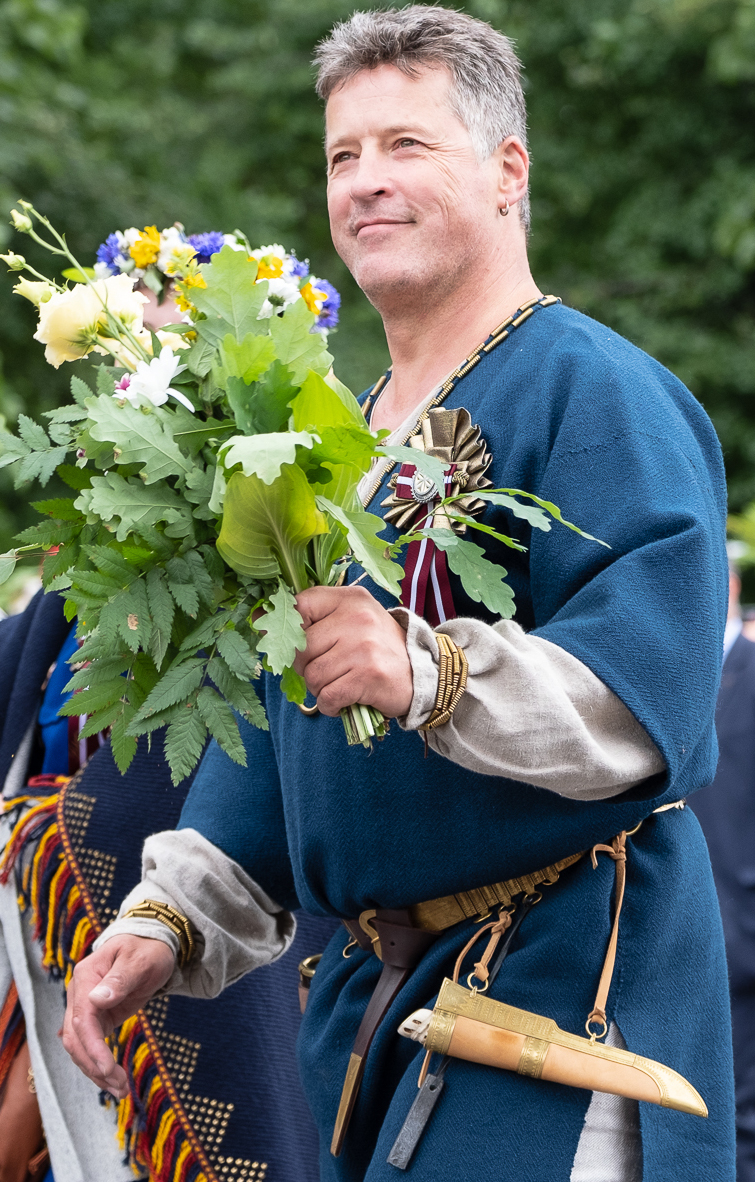
Agris Daņiļevičs at the Latvian Song and Dance Festival (2018)

Agris Daņiļevičs (born 26 October 1963 in Sigulda) is a Latvian choreographer and dance teacher.

== Biography ==
In 1985, he graduated from the Department of Culture and Art Sciences of the Latvian Conservatory. In 2008, he obtained a master's degree in theater directing at the Latvian Academy of Culture.

In the 1980s, he worked in the folk dance ensemble "Gundega", initially as a tutor, later as an artistic director. In 1985, he became head of the Krimulda Parish dance group "Dzirnas", then in 1998 head of the dance school "Dzirnas". In 2002, he founded dance school "Dzirnas" in Riga.

His choreographies have been used at the Latvian Song and Dance Festival, the Latvian School Youth Song and Dance Festival, Expo 2000 and elsewhere. He has been a member of the jury of several TV shows, as well as participated in the TV3 Latvia show "Koru kari 1 " ("Choir Wars") as a member of the Sigulda choir.

== Awards and decorations ==
- 2011: Knight of the Order of the Three Stars
- 1998: Spēlmaņu nakts Award for the best motion direction of the year for the performance of the opera Alčīna
