= Eesti otsib superstaari season 3 =

Season of television series

Eesti otsib superstaari
- Season 3
- Hosted by: Tanel Padar; Ithaka Maria
- Judges: Mihkel Raud; Maarja-Liis Ilus; Rein Rannap
- Winner: Ott Lepland
- Runner-up: Birgit Varjun
- Finals venue: Linnahall

Release
- Original network: TV3
- Original release: September 6 – December 20, 2009

Season chronology
- ← Previous; Season 2 Next → Season 4

The third season of Eesti otsib superstaari premiered on September 6, 2009. The winner of the season was Ott Lepland.

In Autumn 2008 TV3 announced that the third season would be postponed. The show was replaced by new show Eesti otsib lemmiklaulu (Estonia is looking for a favourite song). In June 2009 TV3 announced that the auditions for third season will start in August 2009.

In July 2009, Estonian Public Broadcasting (ERR) announced that one of the judges, Heidy Purga, is not allowed to take part of that program. Purga is a director of ERR's radio station, Raadio 2. ERR explained that the decision was made, because there is a lot work to do in Raadio 2 at the moment and they will not allow Purga to take part in competitors program.

Several days later TV3 announced new hosts and a new judge. The hosts for the third season are a Eurovision Song Contest-winning rockstar Tanel Padar and singer Ithaka Maria. Heidy Purga was replaced by singer Maarja-Liis Ilus.

This season also produced representatives of Estonia in the Eurovision Song Contest three times in a row: Robin Juhkental, who made the semifinals on the show, represented his country as a lead singer of Malcolm Lincoln in 2010; Getter Jaani, who finished in fourth place, sang for Estonia in 2011 and Ott Lepland, the winner of the season, had his turn in 2012 achieving sixth place in the contest. Five years later, Semifinalist Elina Nechayeva scored an 8th place at the Grand Finale of the contest.

== Auditions ==
Auditions for 2009 were held in Pärnu (August 19), Rakvere (August 26), Tartu (August 29 & 30) & Tallinn (August 22 & 23) Only about 60–80 singers qualified to the Theatre round.

== Theatre rounds ==
Theatre rounds were held on September 7 & 8, 2009 in Vene Teater (Russian Theatre in Estonia). 25 new singers qualified to the semi-finals.

== Semi-finals ==
Twenty-five new singers qualified to the studio rounds: 13 female and 12 male. The studio rounds take place in two weeks. First week is girls' week and the second is boys' week. During the week two shows are taking place. In the first show all girls or boys are participating. The judges have the right to send one participant directly to the final. Among others eight new singers are sent to the second show. In the second show four singers are sent to the finals by televoters.

=== Girls' Round 1 ===
- Kristiina Freimane – "I Don't Want to Talk About It" by Crazy Horse
- Getter Jaani – "Ma tõde tean" by Nele-Liis Vaiksoo
- Birgit Varjun – "I Remember You" by Skid Row
- Kerli Kivilaan – "Ordinary People" by John Legend
- Liina Uibo – "Respect" by Otis Redding
- Maria Alanurme – "Hands Clean" by Alanis Morissette
- Eliisa Kõiv – "Human" by The Killers
- Anna Kutšinskaja – "Love You Inside Out" by The Bee Gees
- Liisa Orav – "Ride" by Cary Brothers
- Sabrina Abdullajeva – "Heartless" by Kanye West
- Elina Nechayeva – "Sunday Morning" by Maroon 5
- Anne Arrak – "State of Mind" by Raul Midón
- Kene Vernik – "Taking Off" by The Cure

Eliminated: Kristiina Freimane, Maria Alanurme, Liisa Orav, Anna Kutšinskaja
Advanced to the final (Judges' choice): Kene Vernik

=== Girls' Round 2 ===
- Getter Jaani – "Cruella de Vil" from a film One Hundred and One Dalmatians
- Kerli Kivilaan – "Ööviiul" by Erko Niit
- Elina Nechayeva – "What's Up?" by 4 Non Blondes
- Eliisa Kõiv – "No End" by The Ark
- Sabrina Abdullajeva – "Hero" by Chad Kroeger featuring Josey Scott
- Anne Arrak – "Sacrifice" by Anouk
- Liina Uibo – "Nobody's Wife" by Anouk
- Birgit Varjun – "Knockin' on Heaven's Door" by Bob Dylan

Eliminated: Kerli Kivilaan, Elina Nechayeva, Sabrina Abdullajeva, Liina Uibo
Advanced to the final: Getter Jaani, Eliisa Kõiv, Anne Arrak, Birgit Varjun

=== Boys' Round 1 ===
- Sten-Martin Saarest – "Olen valinud tee" by Tõnis Mägi
- Robin Juhkental – "The Way You Make Me Feel" by Michael Jackson
- Kristen Kasuk – "I Love Rock 'n' Roll" by Arrows
- Mick Pedaja – "Crazy" by Gnarls Barkley
- Andrei Ozdoba – "Get It Together" by Seal
- Marten Kuningas – "Starman" by David Bowie
- Anis Arumets – "A Modern Myth" by Thirty Seconds to Mars
- Beno Kudrin – "Broken Strings" by James Morrison
- Keito Kaljulaid – "Ain't No Sunshine" by Bill Withers
- Jaanus Saago – "In the Pines"
- Ott Lepland – "Permanent" by David Cook
- Karel Tallermaa – "Everything" by Michael Bublé

Eliminated: Sten-Martin Saarest, Robin Juhkental, Kristen Kasuk
Advanced to the final (Judges' choice): Anis Arumets

=== Boys' Round 2 ===
- Mick Pedaja – "Üksikud hinged" by traFFic
- Ott Lepland – "All by Myself" by Eric Carmen
- Andrei Ozdoba – "Angels" by Robbie Williams
- Beno Kudrin – "Hallelujah" by Leonard Cohen
- Jaanus Saago – "Billie Jean" by Michael Jackson
- Karel Tallermaa – "Love Foolosophy" by Jamiroquai
- Keito Kaljulaid – "Tears in Heaven" by Eric Clapton
- Marten Kuningas – "Gold" by Spandau Ballet

Eliminated: Karel Tallermaa, Beno Kudrin, Keito Kaljulaid, Mick Pedaja
Advanced to the final: Marten Kuningas, Ott Lepland, Andrei Ozdoba, Jaanus Saago

== Finalists ==
(Ages stated at time of contest)

Contestant	Age	Hometown	Voted off	Liveshow theme
Ott Lepland	22	Jüri	Winner	Grand Finale
Birgit Varjun	23	Sangaste	20 December 2009	Grand Finale
Marten Kuningas	23	Tallinn	13 December 2009	Song from Mother's/Father's Youth & Duets
Getter Jaani	16	Tallinn	6 December 2009	Ivo Linna Songs & Current Hits
Jaanus Saago	19	Suislepa	29 November 2009	Dance Songs & Country Songs
Anis Arumets	18	Tartu	22 November 2009	Acoustic Songs
Anne Arrak	21	Tartu	25 October 2009; 15 November 2009	Pop Hits; Love Songs
Kene Vernik	24	Tartu	8 November 2009	My Birth Year
Eliisa Kõiv	19	Elva	1 November 2009	Songs from the TV Show "Eesti otsib lemmiklaulu"
Andrei Ozdoba	23	Tallinn	1 November 2009	Songs from the TV Show "Eesti otsib lemmiklaulu"

== Finals ==
=== Top 10: Pop-hits ===
- Marten Kuningas – "Song 2" by Blur
- Getter Jaani – "Iseendale" by Eda-Ines Etti
- Birgit Varjun – "Cryin'" by Aerosmith
- Andrei Ozdoba – "Elevation" by U2
- Ott Lepland – "Everybody Hurts" by R.E.M.
- Kene Vernik – "Wicked Game" by Chris Isaak
- Jaanus Saago – "Black Hole Sun" by Soundgarden
- Anne Arrak – "With or Without You" by U2
- Eliisa Kõiv – "They Don't Care About Us" by Michael Jackson
- Anis Arumets – "Can't Take My Eyes off You" by Frankie Valli

Bottom three: Getter Jaani, Jaanus Saago, Anne Arrak
Bottom two: Getter Jaani, Anne Arrak
Eliminated: ~~Anne Arrak~~ No one

=== Top 10: Songs from TV show "Eesti otsib lemmiklaulu" ===
- Andrei Ozdoba – "Aeg ei peatu" by Apelsin
- Anne Arrak – "Rahu" by Ruja
- Ott Lepland – "Eestlane olen ja eestlaseks jään" by Alo Mattiisen
- Anis Arumets – "Juulikuu lumi" by Terminaator
- Getter Jaani – "Laul põhjamaast" by Ülo Vinter
- Marten Kuningas – "Mägede hääl" by Mahavok
- Jaanus Saago – "Valgus" by Gunnar Graps
- Birgit Varjun – "Eesti muld ja Eesti süda" by Ruja
- Eliisa Kõiv – "Depressiivsed Eesti väikelinnad" by HU?
- Kene Vernik – "Massikommunikatsioon" by Singer Vinger

Bottom three: Andrei Ozdoba, Anis Arumets, Eliisa Kõiv
Eliminated: Andrei Ozdoba, Eliisa Kõiv

=== Top 8: Songs from singers' birth year ===
- Birgit Varjun – "Who Wants to Live Forever" by Queen
- Marten Kuningas – "Take On Me" by a-ha
- Getter Jaani – "See maailm uus" from the Disney film Aladdin
- Anis Arumets – "Smells Like Teen Spirit" by Nirvana
- Jaanus Saago – "Blaze Of Glory" by Jon Bon Jovi
- Kene Vernik – "Money For Nothing" by Dire Straits
- Ott Lepland – "Dude (Looks Like a Lady)" by Aerosmith
- Anne Arrak – "First Time" by Robin Beck

Bottom three: Anis Arumets, Jaanus Saago, Kene Vernik
Eliminated: Kene Vernik

=== Top 7: Love songs ===
- Getter Jaani – "I'm a Believer" by The Monkees
- Jaanus Saago – "Nothing Else Matters" by Metallica
- Birgit Varjun – "Bitch" by Meredith Brooks
- Marten Kuningas – "Valged roosid" by Tarmo Pihlap
- Ott Lepland – "You Can Leave Your Hat On" by Randy Newman
- Anne Arrak – "Still Loving You" by Scorpions
- Anis Arumets – "Starlight" by Muse

Bottom three: Jaanus Saago, Anne Arrak, Marten Kuningas
Bottom two: Marten Kuningas, Anne Arrak
Eliminated: Anne Arrak

=== Top 6: Acoustic round ===
- Jaanus Saago – "Teisel pool vett" by Urmas Alender
- Birgit Varjun – "Dear Mr. President" by P!nk
- Ott Lepland – "Hüvasti, kollane koer" by Urmas Alender
- Getter Jaani – "The Climb" by Miley Cyrus
- Anis Arumets – "The Kill" by Thirty Seconds to Mars
- Marten Kuningas – "Space Oddity" by David Bowie

Bottom two: Getter Jaani, Anis Arumets
Eliminated: Anis Arumets

=== Top 5: Dance & country songs ===
- Getter Jaani – "Stop It (I Like It)" by Rick Guard
- Ott Lepland – "What's My Name" by Snoop Dogg
- Jaanus Saago – "Celebration" by Kool & the Gang
- Marten Kuningas – "Let's Dance" by David Bowie
- Birgit Varjun – "I Kissed a Girl" by Katy Perry
- Getter Jaani – "Ice Cream Freeze (Let's Chill)" by Miley Cyrus
- Ott Lepland – "Angel" by Sarah McLachlan
- Jaanus Saago – "The First Cut Is the Deepest" by Cat Stevens
- Marten Kuningas – "Love Will Tear Us Apart" by Joy Division
- Birgit Varjun – "Blue" by LeAnn Rimes

Bottom two: Birgit Varjun, Jaanus Saago
Eliminated: Jaanus Saago

=== Top 4: Ivo Linna songs & current hits ===
- Marten Kuningas – "Luiged läinud, lumi maas"
- Birgit Varjun – "Sülitan vaid alla tuult"
- Getter Jaani – "Taas punab päiksekiirtes pihlapuu"
- Ott Lepland – "Kohtumistund"
- Marten Kuningas – "Moonduja" by Birgit Õigemeel
- Birgit Varjun – "Sober" by P!nk
- Getter Jaani – "Happy" by Leona Lewis
- Ott Lepland – "Light On" by David Cook

Bottom two: Getter Jaani, Birgit Varjun
Eliminated: Getter Jaani

=== Top 3: Song from mother's/father's youth & Duets ===
- Ott Lepland – "One Vision" by Queen
- Marten Kuningas – "Naer" by Virmalised
- Birgit Varjun – "Still Got the Blues" by Gary Moore
- Ott Lepland with Sandra Nurmsalu – "Rändajad" by Urban Symphony
- Marten Kuningas with Vaiko Eplik – "Blackbird" by The Beatles
- Birgit Varjun with Erik Mermaa – "Hero" by Chad Kroeger featuring Josey Scott

Eliminated: Marten Kuningas

=== Superfinale: The contestants' favourite & Christmas song & Winner's song ===
The superfinal of Eesti otsib superstaari was held on December 20, 2009, in Linnahall Arena, Tallinn. Both superfinalists performed three songs: a well-known Christmas song, their own favourite performance of the season and winner's song. The winner was chosen by viewers through telephone and SMS voting.

- Ott Lepland - "Kohtumistund" by Ivo Linna
- Birgit Varjun - "Blue" by LeAnn Rimes
- Ott Lepland - "The Little Drummer Boy"
- Birgit Varjun - "Amazing Grace"
- Ott Lepland - "I Will Talk and Hollywood Will Listen" by Robbie Williams
- Birgit Varjun - "You Shook Me All Night Long" by AC/DC

Winner: Ott Lepland
Runner-up: Birgit Varjun

=== Elimination chart ===
Legend
Did Not Perform	Female	Male	Top 25	Top 10	Winner

Safe	Safe First	Safe Last	Eliminated

Stage:		Semi				Finals								
Week:		10/08	10/11	10/15	10/18	10/25	11/01	11/08	11/15	11/22	11/29	12/06	12/13	12/20
Place	Contestant	Result												
1	Ott Lepland				Top 10									Winner
2	Birgit Varjun		Top 10								Btm 2	Btm 2		Runner-Up
3	Marten Kuningas				Top 10				Btm 2				Elim	
4	Getter Jaani		Top 10			Btm 2				Btm 2		Elim		
5	Jaanus Saago				Top 10	Btm 3		Btm 2	Btm 3		Elim			
6	Anis Arumets			Top 10			Btm 3	Btm 3		Elim				
7	Anne Arrak		Top 10			Saved			Elim					
8	Kene Vernik	Top 10						Elim						
9–10	Eliisa Kõiv		Top 10				Elim							
9–10	Andrei Ozdoba				Top 10		Elim							
Semi	Keito Kaljulaid				Elim									
Semi	Beno Kundrin				Elim									
Semi	Mick Pedaja				Elim									
Semi	Karel Tallermaa				Elim									
Semi	Robin Juhkental			Elim										
Semi	Kristen Kasuk			Elim										
Semi	Sten-Martin Saarest			Elim										
Semi	Sabrina Abdullajeva		Elim											
Semi	Kerli Kivilaan		Elim											
Semi	Elina Netšajeva		Elim											
Semi	Liina Uibo		Elim											
Semi	Maria Alanurme	Elim												
Semi	Kristiina Freimane	Elim												
Semi	Anna Kutšinskaja	Elim												
Semi	Liisa Orav	Elim												
