= Loaded with Zoul =

2010 album by Malcolm Lincoln

Loaded With Zoul

Studio album by Malcolm Lincoln
- Released: 20 May 2010
- Recorded: 2010
- Genre: Electropop, New wave revival
- Length: 37:09
- Label: Universal Music
- Producer: Vaiko Eplik, Robin Juhkental

Singles from Loaded With Zoul
- 1. "Siren" Released: 7 May 2010; 2. "Loaded With Zoul" Released: 2010

Loaded With Zoul is the debut album by the Estonian duo Malcolm Lincoln, released 20 May 2010 on Universal Music. The release date coincides with frontman Robin Juhkental's birthday.

The album was produced by Vaiko Eplik and Robin Juhkental, mixed by Siim Mäesalu, and mastered at Finnvox Studios. The record was physically released in the Baltic States and Scandinavia, but is also available as a digital download internationally.

Two singles were released from the album: "Siren" and "Loaded With Zoul".

Robin Juhkental has described the album as "electronic music, but in the style of the 1960s and 70s".

== Track listing ==
All songs written by Robin Juhkental, except track 4, written by Reigo Vilbiks and Robin Juhkental.

No.	Title	Length
1.	"Loaded With Zoul"	2:37
2.	"Where Did We Loze Our Way"	3:14
3.	"I Wanna"	3:09
4.	"Wake Me Up"	3:08
5.	"I'm Ztill Ztanding"	3:36
6.	"Duya Duya Duya"	4:18
7.	"FunkZhite"	2:24
8.	"Danz and Wadz Da Cloudz"	3:01
9.	"Uu Monica"	3:01
10.	"Siren"	2:54
11.	"Body of Da Chrizt"	3:19
12.	"Found a Way"	2:28
