= Getter Jaani =

Estonian singer (born 1993)

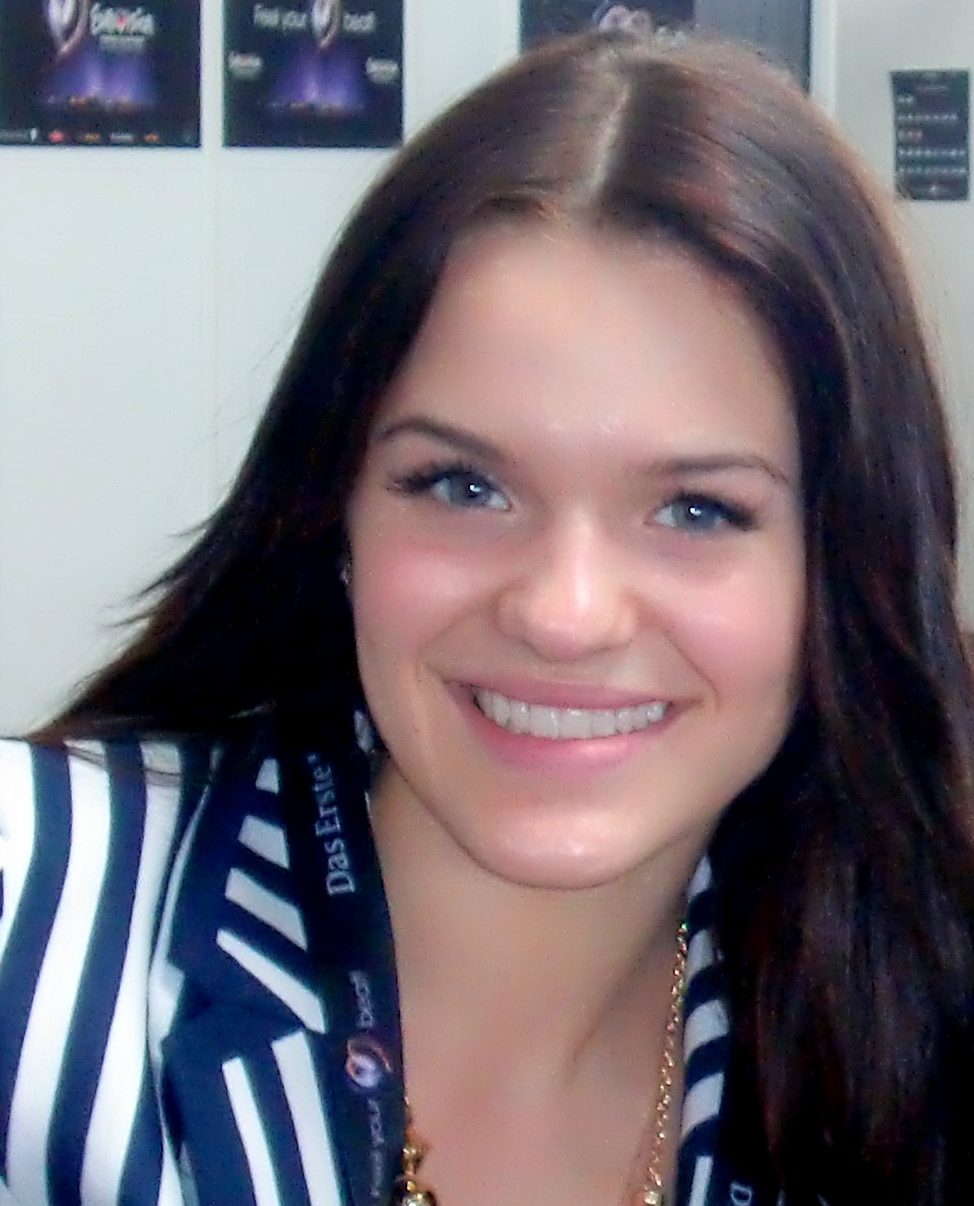
- Jaani at the Eurovision Song Contest 2011

Background information
- Born: Getter Roomet; 3 February 1993 (age 33); Tallinn, Estonia
- Genres: Pop
- Occupations: Singer, actress
- Years active: 2009–present
- Label: Moonwalk
- Website: www.getterjaani.ee

Getter Jaani (born 3 February 1993) is an Estonian singer and actress. She represented Estonia in the Eurovision Song Contest 2011 with the song "Rockefeller Street".

== Early life ==
Getter was born and raised in Tallinn. In 2015, she graduated night school and was awarded a high school diploma.

Besides Estonian, she also has Russian ancestry.

== Career ==
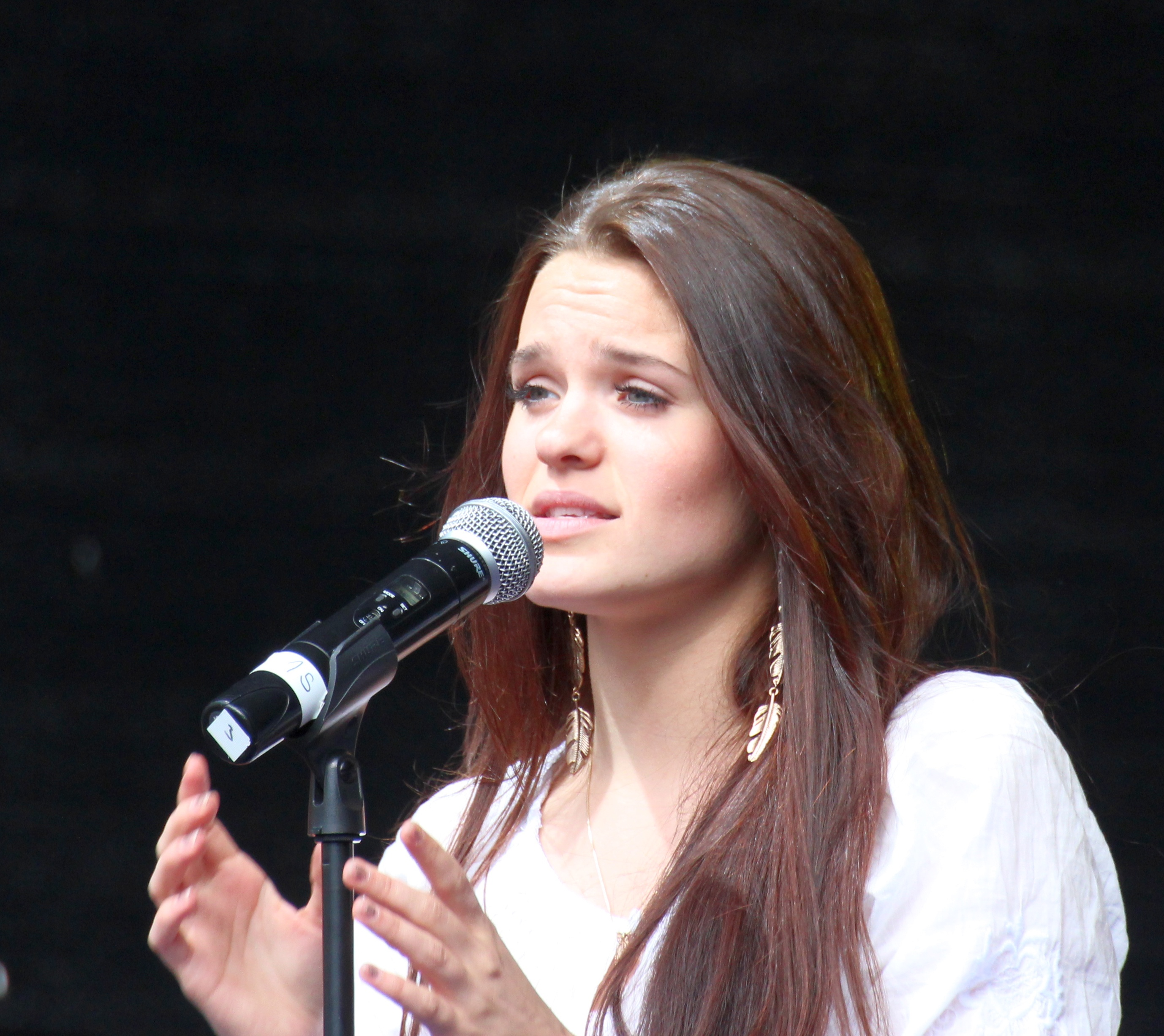
Jaani performing in May 2012

Jaani first became publicly known in Estonia in 2009 as a participant in the third season of Eesti otsib superstaari, the Estonian version of Pop Idol. She finished fourth and her performance gained her the role of Sharpay Evans in the Estonian version of High School Musical.

Jaani represented Estonia in the Eurovision Song Contest 2011, with her entry "Rockefeller Street" coming in 24th place in the final. That same year, she participated as a celebrity contestant on Tantsud tähtedega, the Estonian version of Dancing with the Stars.

In 2012, Jaani presented the scores on behalf of Estonia for the grand-finals of the Eurovision Song Contest 2012 in Baku, Azerbaijan.

In 2013, Jaani landed the role of Sandy in the musical Grease.

Jaani's Eurovision song "Rockefeller Street" later became an internet meme after a video of two Chinese men playing a "Nightcore" version of the song using the rhythm game osu! following them dancing to the song became popular on social media. Their dance moves also became popular, spreading to apps and sites such as TikTok and YouTube in 2018. The original song is in E♭ minor while the meme nightcore version is in G minor, having been sped up by 1.25x with the pitch also increased. Jaani spoke out about this in 2019 on "etv", "When I heard the new version which is a lot faster, the original Rockefeller Street seems like a great lullaby next to it."

== Songs performed on Eesti otsib superstaari ==
Week	Title	Original artist	Result
Semi-finals
1	"Ma tõde tean"	Nele-Liis Vaiksoo	Safe
2	"Cruella de Vil"	Bill Lee	Safe
Finals
1	"Iseendale"	Eda-Ines Etti	Bottom two
2	"Laul Põhjamaast"	Ülo Vinter	Safe
3	"See maailm uus" ("A Whole New World")	Brad Kane & Lea Salonga	Safe
4	"I'm a Believer"	The Monkees	Safe
5	"The Climb"	Miley Cyrus	Bottom two
6	"Stop it (I Like It)"	Rick Guard	Safe
6	"Ice Cream Freeze (Let's Chill)"	Miley Cyrus	Safe
7	"Taas punab pihlakaid"	Ivo Linna	Eliminated
7	"Happy"	Leona Lewis	Eliminated

== Discography ==
=== Albums ===
Album Title	Album details	Peak chart positions
Album Title	Album details	EST
Rockefeller Street	Released: 1 May 2011; Label: Moonwalk; Format: CD, Digital download	3
DNA	Released: 12 December 2014; Label: Moonwalk; Format: CD, Digital download	—

=== Extended plays ===
- 2010: Parim Päev EP (Moonwalk)
- 2011: Jõuluvalgus

=== Singles ===
Title	Year	Peak chart positions		Album
Title	Year	EST Air.	IRE	Album
"Vaid Suve" (featuring Chapter One)	2010	*	—	
"Parim päev"	2010	*	—	Parim Päev EP
"Grammofon"	2010	*	—	Parim Päev EP
"Rockefeller Street"	2011	*	44	Rockefeller Street
"Valged ööd" (featuring Koit Toome)	2011	164	—	Rockefeller Street
"Me kõik jääme vanaks"	2011	*	—	Rockefeller Street
"Talveöö" (featuring Koit Toome and Karl Madis)	2011	*	—	Jõuluvalgus
"NYC Taxi"	2012	*	—	DNA
"Jõuluvalgus"	2012	*	—	Jõuluvalgus
"Kes on süüdi"	2013	*	—	Non-album single
"Meelelahutajad" (featuring Maia Vahtramäe)	2013	*	—	DNA
"Rannamaja" (featuring Koit Toome)	2014	*	—	DNA
"DNA"	2015	*	—	DNA
"Lootuste tänaval"	2015	*	—	DNA
"Kullaväljade tuul"	2016	*	—	Non-album singles
"The Game"	2025	19	—	Non-album singles
"—" denotes a recording that did not chart or was not released in that territory. "*" denotes that the chart did not exist at that time.

== Music videos ==
- "Rockefeller Street" (2011, live)
- "Talveöö" (2011, live)
- "NYC Taxi" (2012)
- "Sulle, kes sa kaugel" (2012, live with Koit Toome)
- "Kes on süüdi" (Feb, 2013)
- "Meelelahutajad" (Nov, 2013)

Awards and achievements
Preceded by Malcolm Lincoln and Manpower 4 with Siren	Estonia in the Eurovision Song Contest; 2011	Succeeded by Ott Lepland with Kuula
