= Eesti otsib superstaari season 4 =

Season of television series

Eesti otsib superstaari
- Season 4
- Hosted by: Evelin Pang; Hele Kõrve
- Judges: Mihkel Raud; Maarja-Liis Ilus; Rein Rannap
- Winner: Liis Lemsalu
- Runner-up: Artjom Savitski
- Finals venue: Nokia Concert Hall, Tallinn

Release
- Original network: TV3
- Original release: February 13 – June 12, 2011

Season chronology
- ← Previous; Season 3 Next → Season 5

The fourth season of Eesti otsib superstaari premiered on February 13, 2011, on TV3. The show was won by Liis Lemsalu.

On 9 December 2010, Mihkel Raud, one of the judges, said on his Twitter account, that the fourth season starts in the beginning of 2011. On December 13, it was confirmed by TV3.

There were no changes in the judges' panel. The judges were Mihkel Raud, Maarja-Liis Ilus and Rein Rannap. The hosts for the fourth season were two actresses, Hele Kõrve and Evelin Pang.

Liis Lemsalu, the winner of the show, was awarded with €10,000 and a record contract with the Universal Music. The show is followed by a tour "Eesti superstaar - Live tuur" around Estonia in June 2011.

== Auditions ==
Auditions for 2011 season were held in Pärnu (January 16), Tallinn (January 22–23), Tartu (January 29- 30) and Jõhvi (February 6, 2011). Only 60 singers were given the 'yellow cards' and qualified to the theatre rounds.

== Theatre rounds ==
As only 20 of the sixty participants were male, all boys automatically qualified to the second round. Twenty-two girls qualified to the second round.

In the second round, participants were divided into 21 duos. Duos performed either Ott Lepland and Lenna Kuurmaa's "Sinuni" or James Morrison and Nelly Furtado's "Broken Strings". After second round, all the participants were divided into three groups named "Yes", "Maybe" and "No". People in groups "Yes" and "Maybe" qualified to the third round.

In the third round, girls were given a choice to sing either Janis Joplin's "Piece of My Heart" or Katy Perry's "Firework". Boys chose between Koit Toome's "Mälestused", Robbie Williams' "Let Me Entertain You" and Kings of Leon's "Use Somebody". Ten male and ten female participants advanced to the semi-finals a.k.a. studio rounds.

== Semi-finals a.k.a. Studio rounds ==
The studio rounds took place on March 27, April 3 and 10. In the first studio round 10 girls performed and in the second 10 boys performed. After nationwide televote, three participants from each semi-final qualified to the finals. The judges chose 10 participants from the first two rounds to the third round. Televoters voted three of them to the finals. Tenth finalist was chosen by the judges as a wildcard.

=== First week ===
Girls' round took place on March 27, 2011.

- Marit Kesa – "Usu ometi" by Mahavok
- Triin Niitoja – "Whataya Want from Me" by Adam Lambert
- Katrin-Merili Poom – "Lost" by Anouk
- Raahel Pilpak – "Poker Face" by Lady Gaga
- Liis Lemsalu – "Vanaisa kiri" by Indigolapsed
- Marilyn Ollep – "Not as We" by Alanis Morissette
- Reilika Saks – "Howl" by Florence and the Machine
- Rosanna Lints – "The Voice Within" by Christina Aguilera
- Liis Reisner – "Pühendus" by Tõnis Mägi
- Teele Viira – "Sex on Fire" by Kings of Leon

Advanced to the final: Triin Niitoja, Rosanna Lints, Teele Viira
Advanced to the second chance semi-final (jury's choice): Katri-Merili Poom, Liis Lemsalu, Liis Reisner, Marilyn Ollep, Marit Kesa, Raahel Pilpak

=== Second week ===
Boys' week took place on April 3, 2011.

- Indrek Rebane – "Eternity" by Robbie Williams
- Mikk Tivas – "You Found Me" by The Fray
- Taavi Kendra – "Love Me Or Not" by Dub FX
- Leemet Onno – "What Are Words" by Chris Medina
- Kevin Johannson – "Say You Don't Want It" by One Night Only
- Jaan Lehepuu – "Saatanlik naine" (Devil Woman) by Jaak Joala
- Lauri Antsov – "Neutron Star Collision" by Muse
- Artjom Savitski – "The Kill" by Thirty Seconds to Mars
- Imre Saarna – "Hello" by Lionel Richie
- Dario Hoffren – Withdrew

Advanced to the final: Leemet Onno, Jaan Lehepuu, Imre Saarna
Advanced to the second chance semi-final (jury's choice): Artjom Savitski, Kevin Johannson, Lauri Atsov, Mikk Tivas

=== Third week ===
The second chance semi-final took place on April 10, 2011. Four of them qualified.

- Lauri Antsov – "Rapunzel" by Lenna Kuurmaa
- Raahel Pilpak – "Sind otsides" by Mikronid
- Kevin Johannson – "Jäljed" by Tõnis Mägi
- Marit Kesa – "Don't Let The Sun Go Down On Me" by Elton John
- Marilyn Ollep – "Vaiki kui võid" by Ruja
- Mikk Tivas – "Tule kui leebe tuul" by Henry Laks
- Liis Reisner – "In My Defence" by Freddie Mercury
- Katrin-Merili Poom – "Kaunilt kaua" by Tõnis Mägi
- Liis Lemsalu – "At Last" by Etta James
- Artjom Savitski – "Nii vaikseks kõik on jäänud" by Ruja

Advanced to the finals: Liis Lemsalu, Kevin Johannson, Artjom Savitski
Advanced to the finals (jury's choice): Katrin-Merili Poom

== Finals ==
=== Week 1 ===
The first final show took place on 17 April 2011. The theme of the show was "Big songs". Participants sang the biggest hits of all time.

Contestants' performances
Act	Order	Song	Result
Rosanna Lints	1	"Listen" by Beyoncé	Safe
Jaan Lehepuu	2	"Billie Jean" by Michael Jackson	Eliminated
Triin Niitoja	3	"Ironic" by Alanis Morissette	Safe
Imre Saarna	4	"The Show Must Go On" by Queen	Safe
Leemet Onno	5	"Every Breath You Take" by The Police	Bottom Three
Teele Viira	6	"Tainted Love" by Soft Cell	Safe
Artjom Savitski	7	"Koit" by Tõnis Mägi	Safe
Liis Lemsalu	8	"I Have Nothing" by Whitney Houston	Safe
Kevin Johannson	9	"Viva la Vida" by Coldplay	Bottom Two
Katrin-Merili Poom	10	"I Don't Wanna Miss A Thing" by Aerosmith	Safe

=== Week 2 ===
The second final show took place on 24 April 2011. Participants sang songs in Estonian.

Contestants' performances
Act	Order	Song	Result
Artjom Savitski	1	"Kuu on päike" by Tanel Padar & The Sun	Safe
Katrin-Merili Poom	2	"Veel" by Anne Veski	Eliminated
Triin Niitoja	3	"Ainult unustamiseks" by Smilers	Bottom Three
Leemet Onno	4	"Michelangelo" by Ivo Linna	Bottom Two
Liis Lemsalu	5	"15 magamata ööd" by Ines	Safe
Kevin Johannson	6	"Vana klaver" by Kalmer Tennosaar	Safe
Rosanna Lints	7	"Oma laulu ei leia üles" by Heli Lääts	Safe
Teele Viira	8	"Armastan vaid sind" by Ivo Linna	Safe
Imre Saarna	9	"Veenus" by Tõnis Mägi	Safe

=== Week 3 ===
The third final show takes place on May 1, 2011. The finalists are singing dance tracks from the 1970s and 1980s.

Contestants' performances
Act	Order	Song	Result
Teele Viira	1	"You Spin Me Round (Like A Record)" by Dead or Alive	Safe
Imre Saarna	2	"Disco Inferno" by The Trammps	Eliminated
Rosanna Lints	3	"I'm Every Woman" by Chaka Khan	Bottom Three
Kevin Johannson	4	"Faith" by George Michael	Bottom Two
Leemet Onno	5	"Rosanna" by Toto	Safe
Triin Niitoja	6	"Flashdance... What a Feeling" by Irene Cara	Safe
Artjom Savitski	7	"Take On Me" by A-ha	Safe
Liis Lemsalu	8	"I Wanna Dance With Somebody" by Whitney Houston	Safe

=== Week 4 ===
The fourth final show took place on May 8, 2011. The finalists sang songs from world's biggest superstars of all time.

Contestants' performances
Act	Order	Song	Result
Liis Lemsalu	1	"Proud Mary" by Tina Turner	Bottom Three
Leemet Onno	2	"Metsaneid" by Tõnis Mägi	Eliminated
Teele Viira	3	"Papa Don't Preach" by Madonna	Safe
Artjom Savitski	4	"Sailing" by Rod Stewart	Safe
Rosanna Lints	5	"It's a Man's Man's Man's World" by James Brown	Safe
Kevin Johannson	6	"Mr. Tambourine Man" by Bob Dylan	Safe
Triin Niitoja	7	"Another Day in Paradise" by Phil Collins	Bottom Two

=== Week 5 ===
The fifth final show took place on May 15, 2011. Contestants sang Big band songs with Bel-Etage Orchestra.

Contestants' performances
Act	Order	Song	Result
Kevin Johannson	1	"A Hard Day's Night"	Eliminated
Rosanna Lints	2	"All the Things You Are"	Safe
Triin Niitoja	3	"What a Wonderful World"	Bottom Two
Artjom Savitski	4	"Sunny"	Safe
Liis Lemsalu	5	"L-O-V-E"	Bottom Three
Teele Viira	6	"Close to You"	Safe

=== Week 6 ===
The sixth final show took place on May 22, 2011. Contestants sang a hit from their year of birth and a song which is composed or has been performed by one of the judges.

Contestants' performances
Act	Order	First song	Order	Second song	Result
Teele Viira	1	"Sweet Child O' Mine" by Guns N' Roses	6	"Tango" by Ruja (Rein Rannap)	Eliminated
Artjom Savitski	2	"Under The Bridge" by Red Hot Chili Peppers	7	"Üksinduse aeg" by Maarja-Liis Ilus (Comp. Rein Rannap)	Safe
Triin Niitoja	3	"I Just Can't Stop Loving You" by Michael Jackson	8	"Annabel" by Mr. Lawrence (Mihkel Raud)	Bottom Two
Liis Lemsalu	4	"Smells Like Teen Spirit" by Nirvana	9	"Sajab lund" by Maarja-Liis Ilus	Safe
Rosanna Lints	5	"You Oughta Know" by Alanis Morissette	10	"Must lind" by Ruja (Rein Rannap)	Safe

=== Week 7 ===
The seventh final show took place on May 29, 2011. Contestants sang a song composed by Hendrik Sal-Saller and a song in foreign language (other than Estonian and English).

Contestants' performances
Act	Order	Sal-Saller's song	Order	Song in foreign language	Result
Triin Niitoja	1	"Nii sind ootan"	5	"Manos al Aire" by Nelly Furtado	Eliminated
Rosanna Lints	2	"Olen Kuul"	6	"En Cambio No" by Laura Pausini	Safe
Artjom Savitski	3	"Keelatud viljade turg"	7	"María" by Ricky Martin	Safe
Liis Lemsalu	4	"Üle tumeda vee"	8	"Den fyrste song eg høyra fekk"	Safe

=== Week 8 ===
The eight final show took place on June 5, 2011. Contestants sang a song about love and a celebrity duet.

Celebrity duets:

- Liis Lemsalu with Oliver Kuusik
- Artjom Savitski with Hele Kõre
- Rosanna Lints with Tõnis Mägi

Contestants' performances
Act	Order	Celebrity duets	Order	Love song	Result
Liis Lemsalu	1	"Messiah" by George Frideric Handel	4	Someone Like You" by Adele	Safe
Artjom Savitski	2	"Siis kui maailm magab veel" by Kristjan Kasearu & Hele Kõrve	5	"Shot" by The Rasmus	Safe
Rosanna Lints	3	"Aeg on lahkuda" by Tõnis Mägi	6	"Can't Stop Lovin' You" by Van Halen	Eliminated

=== Super-final ===
The super-final show took place on June 12, 2011. Contestants sang their favourite song they had performed before in the show, a patriotic song and a "winner" song.

Contestants' performances
Act	Order	Favourite song	Order	Patriotic song	Order	Winner song	Result
Artjom Savitski	1	"Sailing" by Rod Stewart	3	"Sind surmani" by Alo Mattiisen	5	"Closer to the Edge" by Thirty Seconds to Mars	Runner-up
Liis Lemsalu	2	"At Last" by Etta James	4	"Mis maa see on?" by Siiri Sisask	6	"Crazy in Love" by Beyoncé	Winner

== Elimination chart ==
Legend
Female	Male	Top 20	Top 10	Winner

Safe	Bottom Three	Bottom Two	Eliminated	Wild Card Choice	Did Not Perform

Stage:		Semi Finals		Wild; Card	Finals								
Week:		3/27	4/03	4/10	4/17	4/24	5/01	5/08	5/15	5/22	5/29	6/05	6/12
Place	Contestant	Result											
1	Liis Lemsalu	Saved		Viewers				Bottom 3	Bottom 3				Winner
2	Artjom Savitski		Saved	Viewers									Runner-up
3	Rosanna Lints	Top 10					Bottom 3					Elim	
4	Triin Niitoja	Top 10				Bottom 3		Bottom 2	Bottom 2	Bottom 2	Elim		
5	Teele Viira	Top 10								Elim			
6	Kevin Johannson		Saved	Viewers	Bottom 2		Bottom 2		Elim				
7	Leemet Onno		Top 10		Bottom 3	Bottom 2		Elim					
8	Imre Saarna		Top 10				Elim						
9	Katrin-Merili Poom	Saved		Judges		Elim							
10	Jaan Lehepuu		Top 10		Elim								
Wild; Card	Lauri Antsov		Saved	Elim									
Wild; Card	Marit Kesa	Saved		Elim									
Wild; Card	Marilyn Ollep	Saved		Elim									
Wild; Card	Raahel Pilpak	Saved		Elim									
Wild; Card	Liis Reisner	Saved		Elim									
Wild; Card	Mikk Tivas		Saved	Elim									
Semi	Indrek Rebane		Elim										
Semi	Taavi Kendra		Elim										
Semi	Reilika Saks	Elim											
	Dario Hoffren	Withdrew											

== Ratings ==
Episode	Date	Official rating (thousands)	Weekly rank
Auditions 1	13 February	180.00	4
Auditions 2	20 February	Unknown (Did not reach top 10 of the week)	
Auditions 3	27 February	Unknown (Did not reach top 10 of the week)	
Auditions 4	6 March	Unknown	19
Theatre rounds 1	13 March	164.00	10
Theatre rounds 2	20 March	166.00	9
Semi-final 1	27 March	168.00	9
Semi-final 1 (Results)	27 March	185.00	5
Semi-final 2	3 April	174.00	5
Semi-final 2 (Results)	3 April	Unknown (Did not reach top 10 of the week)	
Semi-final 3	10 April	Unknown	13
Semi-final 3 (Results)	10 April	Unknown (Did not reach top 10 of the week)	
Final 1	17 April	163.00	7
Final 1 (Results)	17 April	Unknown	11
Final 2	24 April	161.00	7
Final 2 (Results)	24 April	172.00	4
Final 3	1 May	159.00	8
Final 3 (Results)	1 May	165.00	6
Final 4	8 May	Unknown	14
Final 4 (Results)	8 May	Unknown	13
Final 5	15 May	190.00	6
Final 5 (Results)	15 May	187.00	7
Final 6	22 May	143.00	9
Final 6 (Results)	22 May	189.00	3
Final 7	29 May	184.00	4
Final 7 (Results)	29 May	184.00	3
Final 8	5 June	157.00	2
Final 8 (Results)	5 June	182.00	1
Superfinal	12 June	203.00	2
Superfinal (Results)	12 June	221.00	1
