= Lemsalu =

Lemsalu may refer to:

- Estonian name of Latvian town Limbaži
- Marek Lemsalu (born 1972), Estonian football player
- Liis Lemsalu (born 1992), Estonian singer, winner of the fourth season of Eesti otsib superstaari
