= Mr. Rockefeller =

Mr. Rockefeller may refer to:

- John D. Rockefeller, American oil magnate
- "Mr. Rockefeller", a 1976 Bette Midler song from the Songs for the New Depression

== See also ==
- Rockefeller, surname
