= Malcolm Lincoln =

Estonian musical group

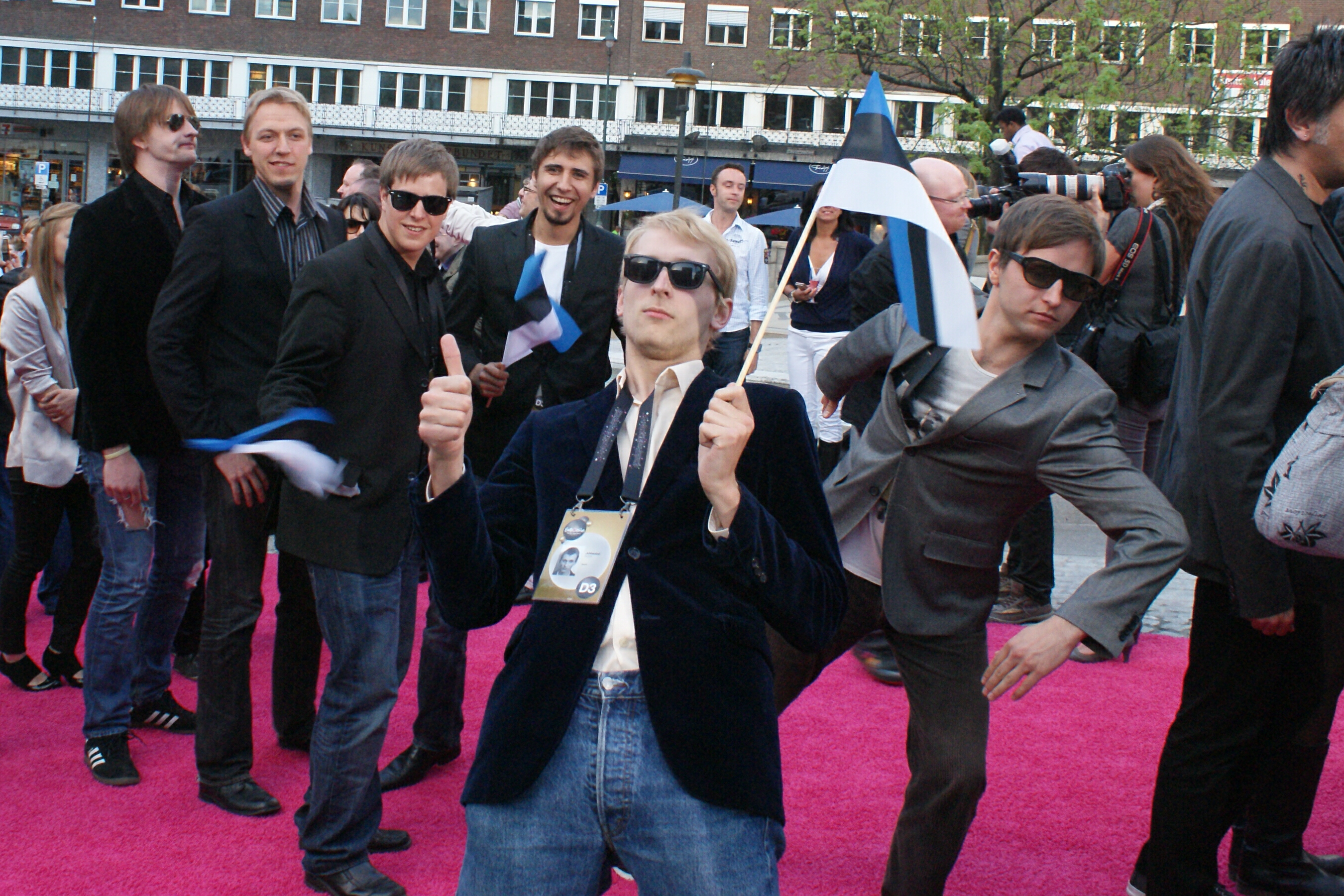
- Malcolm Lincoln with Manpower 4 in Oslo, 2010.

Background information
- Origin: Estonia
- Genres: Electropop
- Years active: 2009–2012
- Labels: Universal Music, Mortimer Snerd
- Past members: Robin Juhkental; Uku Kübar; Märt Tomson; Aap Odres; Madis Kubu; Jakob Juhkam; Johan Alexander Petti; Hans Kurvits; Siim Raidma

Malcolm Lincoln was an Estonian band that formed in October 2009. The members are Robin Juhkental, Jakob Juhkam, Siim Raidma, Ott Adamson, Johan Alexander Petti and Hans Kurvits. The original lineup consisted of Robin Juhkental (vocals/electronics) and Madis Kubu (bass). Juhkental has described their style as "electronic pop with a slightly quirky undertone". The band's name originates from the game show Who Wants to Be a Millionaire?, where a woman incorrectly answered "Malcolm Lincoln" to a question involving the first name of Abraham Lincoln, the 16th President of the United States. Malcolm Lincoln, together with a group of backing vocalists called Manpower 4, won the competition Eesti Laul 2010 with the song "Siren" and represented Estonia in the Eurovision Song Contest 2010. The band released their debut album Loaded With Zoul in May 2010.

== History ==
Malcolm Lincoln first started out as a solo-project of Robin Juhkental, when in the autumn of 2009 he uploaded his first songs to MySpace under the name Malcolm Lincoln. Later, he asked Madis Kubu to join him for their first gig on 31 October 2009 in Tallinn. In December, Vaiko Eplik, an Estonian singer-songwriter and producer, contacted Juhkental and offered releasing a small volume of records under his label Mortimer Snerd and with himself as the producer. Later, Juhkental submitted two potential songs from the upcoming album – "I'm Still Standing Here" and "Siren" – to the song contest Eesti Laul 2010. "Siren" was picked as one of the 10 final songs and later exited the final competition, held on 12 March, as the winning song. It was performed together with a vocal quartet Manpower 4. As a result of winning Eesti Laul 2010, Malcolm Lincoln represented Estonia at the Eurovision Song Contest 2010. In the end of April 2010, Malcolm Lincoln signed an artist contract with Universal Music. The band released their debut album Loaded With Zoul on 20 May 2010. They performed at the first semi-final of Eurovision Song Contest on 25 May 2010 in Bærum, but failed to qualify for the final. In February 2011, Malcolm Lincoln went through a line-up change and Ott Adamson and Jakob Juhkam were added to the band. The band competed again in Eesti Laul 2012 with the song "Bye" but did not make it to the final.

== Discography ==
=== Albums ===
- Loaded With Zoul (2010)

=== Singles ===
- "Siren" (2010)
- "Loaded With Zoul" (2010)
- "Man On The Radio" (2011)
- "Bye" (2012)

Awards and achievements
Preceded by Urban Symphony with "Rändajad"	Estonia in the Eurovision Song Contest (with Manpower 4); 2010	Succeeded by Getter Jaani with "Rockefeller Street"
