= Rockefeller =

Rockefeller is a German surname, originally given to people from the now-abandoned village of Rockenfeld near Neuwied in the Rhineland and commonly referring to subjects associated with the Rockefeller family. It may refer to:

== People with the name ==
=== Rockefeller family ===
- John D. Rockefeller Sr. (1839–1937), founder of the Standard Oil Company
- Laura Spelman Rockefeller (1839–1915), wife of John D.R., namesake of Spelman College
- William Rockefeller (1841–1922), brother of John D.R.
- Bessie Rockefeller Strong (1866–1906), daughter of John D.R.
- Alta Rockefeller Prentice (1871–1962), daughter of John D.R., founder Alta House (settlement house)
- Edith Rockefeller McCormick (1872–1932), daughter of John D.R., feminist, philanthropist
- John D. Rockefeller Jr. (Junior) (1874–1960), son of Senior
- Abby Aldrich Rockefeller (1874–1948), wife of Junior
- Percy Avery Rockefeller (1878–1934), son of William
- Margaret Rockefeller Strong de Larraín, Marquesa de Cuevas (1897–1985), daughter of Bessie Rockefeller Strong, granddaughter of Laura Spellman Rockefeller and John D. Rockefeller
- James Stillman Rockefeller (1902–2004), grandson of William, a gold medal winner at the 1924 Paris Olympics, president of The First National City Bank of New York, now Citibank
- John D. Rockefeller III (1906–1978), third-generation, grandson of John D.R.
- Nelson Rockefeller (1908–1979), third-generation, 41st vice president of the United States and 49th governor of New York
- Laurance Rockefeller (1910–2004), third-generation, conservationist
- Winthrop Rockefeller (1912–1973), third-generation, governor of Arkansas
- David Rockefeller (1915–2017), third-generation, banker and statesman, founder of the Trilateral Commission
- John D. "Jay" Rockefeller IV (1937-2026), fourth-generation, Democratic U.S. Senator for West Virginia
- Michael Rockefeller (1938 – c. 1961), fourth-generation, youngest son of Nelson and his first wife
- Winthrop Paul Rockefeller (1948–2006), Republican lieutenant governor of Arkansas
- Richard Rockefeller (1949–2014), fourth-generation, physician, son of David
- Mark Rockefeller (born 1967), fourth-generation, son of Nelson
- Ariana Rockefeller (born 1982), fifth-generation, granddaughter of David

=== Other people with the name ===
- Alan Rockefeller, American mycologist
- Charles M. Rockefeller, American officer
- Clark Rockefeller (born Christian Karl Gerhartsreiter, 1961), convicted murderer and impostor
- Claudius Rockefeller (1849–1918), American football player and lawyer
- Helen C. Rockefeller (1907–1957), American composer
- Lewis K. Rockefeller (1875–1948), US Representative from New York, Republican; not related to the John D. Rockefeller branch of the family dynasty

== Places ==
- John D. Rockefeller Jr. Memorial Parkway, a road between Yellowstone National Park and Grand Teton National Park
- Laurance S. Rockefeller Preserve, a preserved area within Grand Teton National Park
- Rockefeller State Park Preserve, a state park in New York State
- Rockefeller Park in Cleveland, Ohio

== Arts, entertainment, and media ==
- Beto Rockfeller, a 1968 Brazilian telenovela
- "Rockefeller Street," a song by Estonian singer Getter Jaani
  - Rockefeller Street (album), the song's parent album
- "The Rockafeller Skank", a song by British musician Fatboy Slim

== Institutions ==
- Rockefeller Brothers Fund, principal third-generation philanthropy
- Rockefeller Center, a major New York City building complex
- Rockefeller College, a residential college at Princeton University
- Rockefeller Foundation, principal family philanthropic organization
- Rockefeller Group, former owner of Rockefeller Center
- Rockefeller Institute of Government, a public policy research unit which conducts studies related to government in the United States
- Rockefeller Museum, an archaeological museum in Jerusalem
- Rockefeller Music Hall, a music venue in Oslo, Norway
- Rockefeller University, a private research university in New York City

== Other uses ==
- Oysters Rockefeller, a dish made with oysters
- Rockefeller drug laws

== See also ==
- Cinderella Rockefella, a novelty song, a hit for Esther and Abi Ofarim in 1968
- Roc-A-Fella Records, a large American hip hop record label
- Mike Rockenfeller, a German racing driver
- Rockefeller Republican
