= Elina Nechayeva =

Estonian soprano

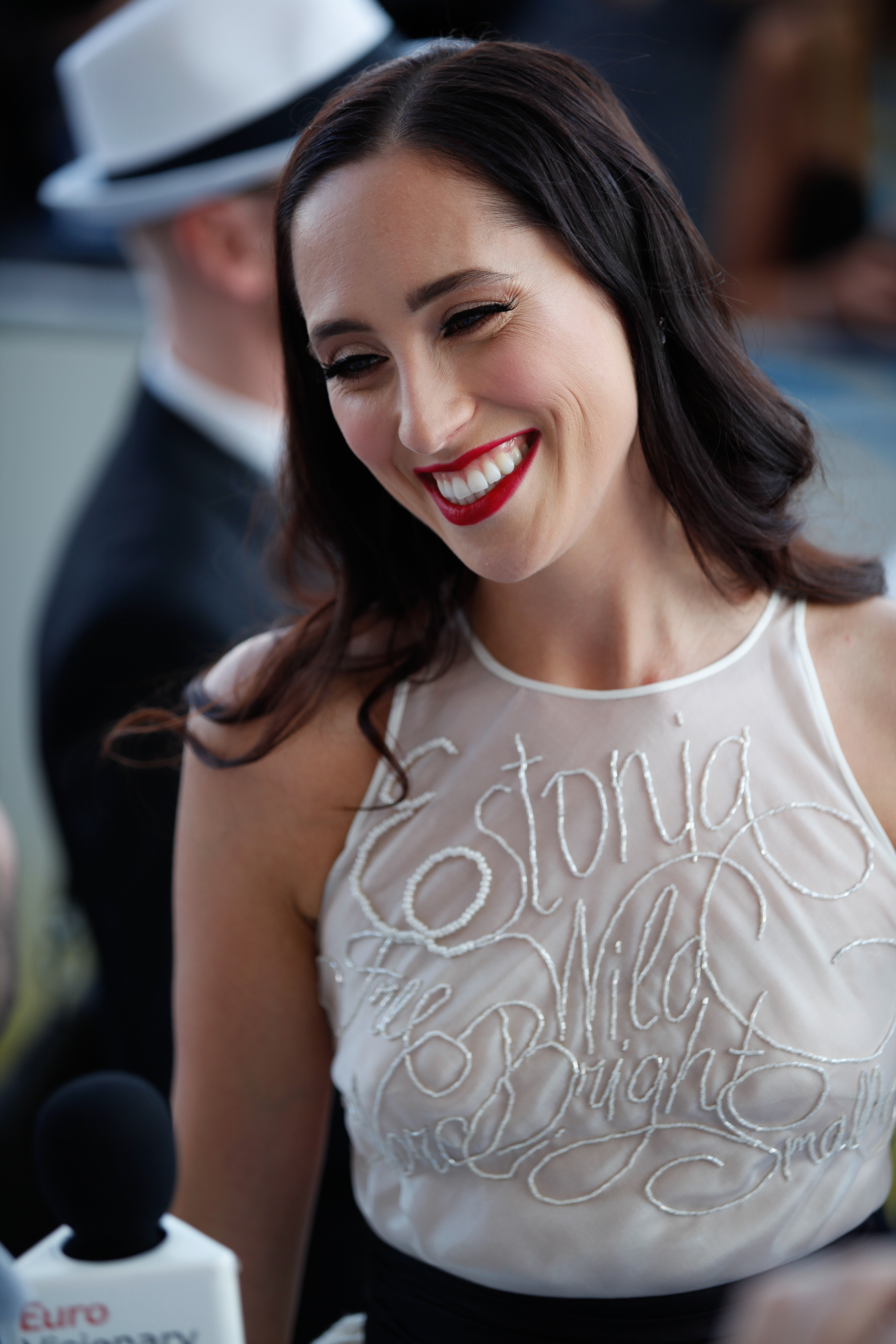
- Nechayeva in 2018

Background information
- Born: Elina Netšajeva; 10 November 1991 (age 34); Tallinn, Estonia
- Genres: Opera; operatic pop; classical crossover
- Occupation: Soprano
- Instruments: Vocals
- Years active: 2009–present
- Website: www.elinanechayeva.com

Elina Nechayeva (Estonian: Elina Netšajeva; born 10 November 1991) is an Estonian soprano. She represented Estonia in the Eurovision Song Contest 2018 in Lisbon, Portugal, with the song "La forza".

== Career ==
In 2009, she made her public debut in the third season of Eesti otsib superstaari, where she participated, but was eliminated in the preliminary girls' round. She graduated from Tallinn French School in 2011. She participated in the ETV competition Klassikatähed 2014 and was one of the three finalists. In 2016, she graduated from the Estonian Academy of Music and Theatre with a master's degree in classical singing. Nechayeva was one of the hosts for the semi-finals of Eesti Laul 2017, along with Marko Reikop. On 3 March 2018, Nechayeva won Eesti Laul 2018 with the Italian-language song "La forza", and she represented Estonia in the Eurovision Song Contest 2018 and came in 8th in the Grand Final.

She also made an appearance in the 2020 American musical comedy film Eurovision Song Contest: The Story of Fire Saga.

She finished second in the second season of the Estonian version of Masked Singer, playing ‘the Phoenix’.

She returned to Eesti Laul in 2022 with the song "Remedy", written by Sven Lõhmus and finishing 8th in the final.

In theatre, she has played Giannetta in Donizetti's "L’elisir d’amore", Juliette Vermont Lehár's "The Count of Luxembourg", Fire's Shadow/Princess’ Shadow/The Nightingale in Ravel's "L’enfant et les sortileges" and Eurydike in Offenbach's "Orpheus in the Underworld". She has also appeared in drama roles and played Eliza Doolittle in Loewe's "My Fair Lady".

== Personal life ==
In December 2017, she anglicized her stage name changing its spelling from Netšajeva to Nechayeva, with the same pronunciation.

She is of mixed Chuvash, Estonian, and Russian ancestry, notably becoming the first Eurovision participant of Chuvash descent.

== Discography ==
=== Singles ===
| Title | Year | Peak chart positions | | Album |
| Title | Year | EST | FRA | Album |
|---|---|---|---|---|
| "La forza" | 2018 | 19 | 115 | The Sound of Beauty |
| "La voce dell'alba" | 2019 | 1 | 87 | Non-album singles |
| "Lind" | 2020 | – | – | Non-album singles |
| "Dans mes rêves" | 2020 | – | – | Non-album singles |
| "What They Say" | 2021 | – | – | Non-album singles |
| "Remedy" | 2021 | – | – | Non-album singles |
| "Ave Maria" | 2022 | – | – | The Sound of Beauty |
| "Plan€t B" | 2022 | – | – | Non-album single |
| "You Raise Me Up" | 2025 | – | – | Dreams |

=== Albums ===
| Year | Name | Label | Format | Language |
|---|---|---|---|---|
| 2021 | The Sound of Beauty | | CD | German, French, Italian, Latin, Estonian, English |
| 2025 | Dreams | Enmusic | CD, digital download, streaming | English |

| Preceded by Koit Toome & Laura with "Verona" | Estonia in the Eurovision Song Contest; 2018 | Succeeded by Victor Crone with "Storm" |
