= Valged ööd =

2011 song by Getter Jaani and Koit Toome

Single by Getter Jaani and Koit Toome

from the album Rockefeller Street
- Released: 22 May 2011
- Genre: Electropop, dance
- Length: 3:50
- Label: Moonwalk
- Songwriter: Sven Lõhmus
- Producer: Sven Lõhmus

Getter Jaani singles chronology
| "Rockefeller Street" (2011) | "Valged ööd" (2011) | "Me kõik jääme vanaks" (2011) |

"Valged ööd" ("White Nights") is the fourth single by Estonian singer Getter Jaani, which is released by the Estonian record label Moonwalk. It features vocals from Koit Toome. "Valged ööd" was released on 22 May 2011 as a Digital download. The single was taken from Getter Jaani's second album Rockefeller Street.

== Track listing ==
Digital download - Single
| No. | Title | Length |
|---|---|---|
| 1. | "Valged ööd" (with Koit Toome) | 3:50 |

== Charts ==
Chart performance
| Chart (2024) | Peak position |
|---|---|
| Estonia Airplay (TopHit) | 164 |

== Release history ==
| Country | Date | Format | Label |
|---|---|---|---|
| United Kingdom | 22 May 2011 | Digital download | Moonwalk |
