= Ott Lepland (album) =

2010 album by Ott Lepland

Studio album by Ott Lepland
- Released: 13 April 2010
- Genre: Pop rock, alternative rock
- Length: 39:42
- Label: Crunch Industry
- Producer: Danel Pandre

Ott Lepland chronology
Ott ja sõbrad (1996)	Ott Lepland (2010)	Laulan ma sind (2011)

Singles from Ott Lepland
- 1. ""Otsides ma pean su jälle leidma"" Released: December 2009; 2. ""Süte peal sulanud jää"" Released: March 2010; 3. ""Läbi öise Tallinna"" Released: April 2010; 4. ""Üheskoos on olla hea"" Released: June 2010

Ott Lepland is Estonian singer Ott Lepland's first solo studio album after his work as a child singer in the 1990s. The album was released on 13 April 2010 in Estonia, and was presented in a series of concerts beginning 16 April in Tallinn.
