= Ott Lepland =

Estonian singer

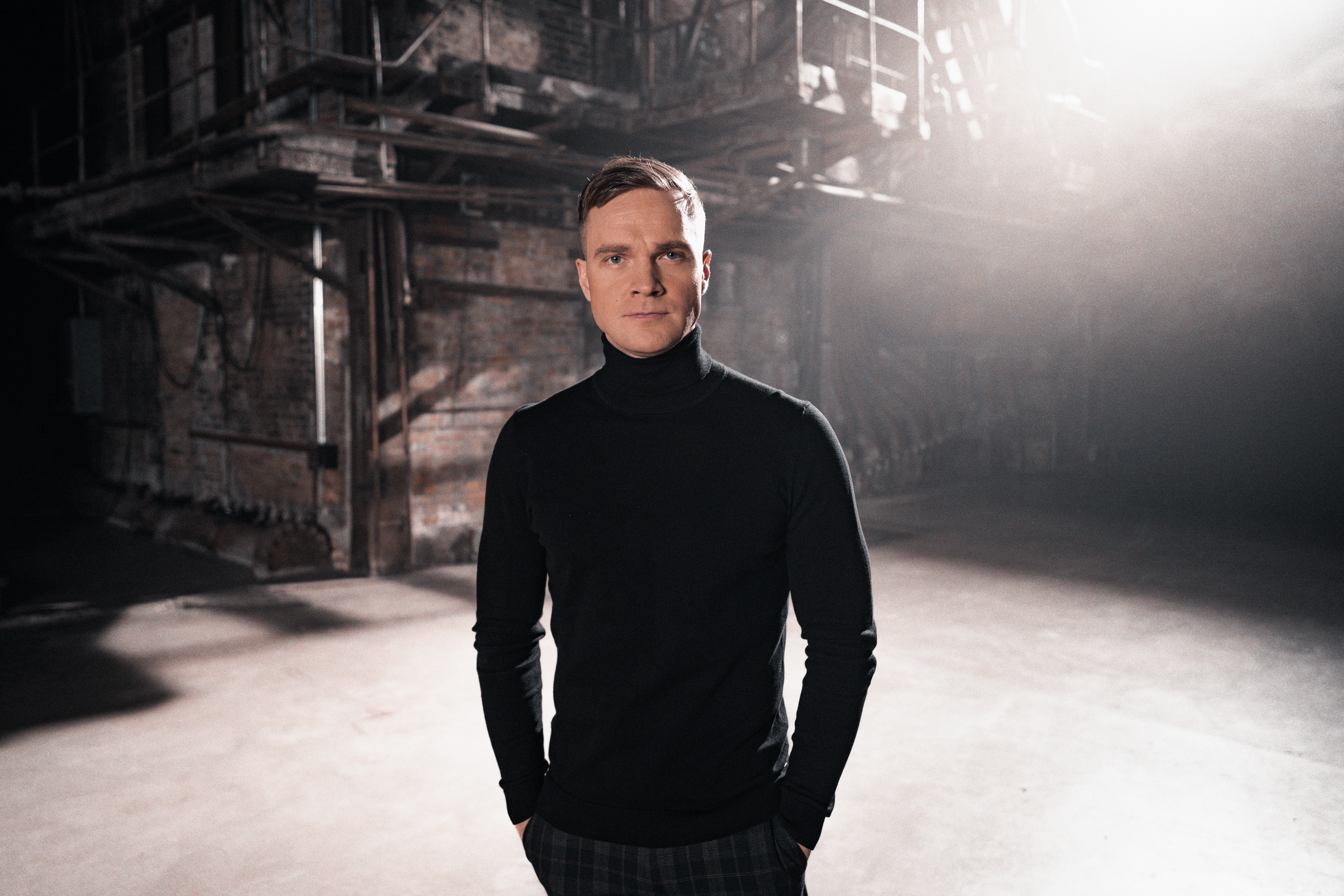
- Ott Lepland in 2020.

Background information
- Born: 17 May 1987 (age 38)
- Origin: Tallinn, then part of Estonian SSR, Soviet Union
- Genres: Pop, Rock
- Instruments: Vocals, piano, keyboards
- Years active: 1995–present
- Label: Crunch Industry
- Website: www.facebook.com/ottlepland

Ott Lepland (born 17 May 1987) is an Estonian singer. He first received national mainstream attention in 2009, after winning the third season of Eesti otsib superstaari. Lepland represented Estonia in the Eurovision Song Contest 2012 in Baku, Azerbaijan with the song "Kuula" placing 6th in the final.

== Biography ==
Lepland has been singing since he was a child. He released four albums with children songs in 1995 and 1996. At the moment Lepland is studying at Georg Ots' Tallinn Music School pop and jazz singing. He has also studied piano for ten years.

Ott has performed in several plays, including the role of Troy Bolton in Estonian State Puppet & Youth Theatre's musical, the Estonian version of High School Musical.

In 2010, Lepland released his self-titled first album after winning the Estonian version of Pop Idol. The self-titled album consists of 12 songs, including singles "Otsides ma pean su jälle leidma", "Süte peal sulanud jää", etc.

In December 2010, a fan book of Lepland was released, it is titled "Lubage mul olla. Ott Lepland." (Let me be. Ott Lepland) with subtitle "8 kuud superstaarina" (8 months as a superstar).

In 2011, Ott participated in another TV3 TV show Laulupealinn (Capital of songs/singing), where Ott represented Estonian town Kärdla. Every week, Lepland had to perform with partners from Kärdla or Hiiu County, including his grandmother, nephew, and a local mixed choir. Lepland won the show and Kärdla has now the title of Singing Capital of Estonia.

== Songs performed in Eesti otsib superstaari ==
Week	Title	Original artist	Result
Semi-final: Boys Round 1	"Permanent"	David Cook	Safe
Semi-final: Boys Round 2	"All by Myself"	Eric Carmen	Safe
Top 10 (Week 1)	"Everybody Hurts"	R.E.M.	Safe
Top 10 (Week 2)	"Eestlane olen ja eestlaseks jään"	Ivo Linna	Safe
Top 8	"Dude (Looks Like a Lady)"	Aerosmith	Safe
Top 7	"You Can Leave Your Hat On"	Randy Newman	Safe
Top 6	"Hüvasti, kollane koer"	Urmas Alender	Safe
Top 5	"Angel"	Sarah McLachlan	Safe
Top 5	"What's My Name?"	Snoop Dogg	Safe
Top 4	"Kohtumistund"	Ivo Linna	Safe
Top 4	"Light On"	David Cook	Safe
Top 3	"One Vision"	Queen	Safe
Top 3	"Rändajad" duet with Sandra Nurmsalu	Urban Symphony	Safe
Superfinal	"The Little Drummer Boy"		Victory
Superfinal	"Kohtumistund"	Ivo Linna	Victory
Superfinal	"I Will Talk and Hollywood Will Listen"	Robbie Williams	Victory

== Discography ==
- "Oti jõululaulud" (Seafarm Recs; 1995)
- "Oti suvelaulud" (Seafarm Recs; 1996)
- "Ott ja Valged jänesed" (BG Muusik; 1996)
- "Ott ja sõbrad" (BG Muusik; 1996)
- "Ott Lepland" (Crunch Industry; 2010)
- "Laulan ma sind" (Crunch Industry; 2011)
- "Öö mu kannul käib" (Crunch Industry; 2012)
- "Siinpoolne" (Crunch Industry; 2015)
- "Maailm mu ees" (Crunch Industry; 2016)
- "Tagasirändur" (with Rein Rannap) (Full House Agency; 2018)

== Singles ==
- "Otsides ma pean su jälle leidma" (December 2009)
- "Süte peal sulanud jää" (February 2010)
- "Läbi öise Tallinna" (April 2010)
- "Üheskoos on olla hea" (June 2010)
- "Kohtume jälle" (October 2010)
- "Sinuni" (with Lenna Kuurmaa) (December 2010)
- "Öö" (April 2011)
- "Tunnen elus end" (October 2011)
- "Kuula" (January 2012)
- "Imede öö" (May 2012)
- "Kodu" (November 2012)
- "Maagiline maa" (December 2012)
- "Jõesäng" (with Tanel Padar and Jalmar Vabarna) (February 2013)
- "Planeet oma teel" (May 2013)
- "Pool tundi veel" (January 2014)
- "Jäädagi nii" (June 2014)
- "Värvid" (with Tanel Padar and Jalmar Vabarna) (16 June 2014)
- "Kiigu ja liugle" (with Tanel Padar, Jalmar Vabarna and Kõrsikud) (November 2014)
- "Ajaga võidu" (15 January 2015)
- "Iga päev" (4 May 2015)
- "Hingesugulane" (October 2015)
- "Sinine safiir" (May 2016)
- "Ärtukuningas" (October 2016)
- "Maailm mu ees" (26 January 2017)
- "Siin me kokku saime" (June 2017)
- "Aeg" (7 February 2018)
- "Süda taob" featuring. Liis Lemsalu (26 April 2018)
- "Uued ootused" (15 May 2019)
- "Kõik mis hea" (23 October 2019)
- "Lootuses" (12 May 2020)
- "Vaikida võib" featuring. Púr Múdd (4 December 2020)
- "Maailm me käes" (17 May 2021)
- "Mina veel Sind ei tea" (7 October 2021)
- "Jõulud rõõmsaks" (1 December 2021)
- "Aovalguses" (11 December 2021)
- "Hommikud" (15 June 2022)
- "Lõpmatuses" (15 March 2023)
- "Kuuvalgus" (12 February 2024)
- "Liiv tuule käes" (31 May 2024)

Awards and achievements
Preceded by Getter Jaani with Rockefeller Street	Estonia in the Eurovision Song Contest; 2012	Succeeded by Birgit Õigemeel with Et uus saaks alguse
Preceded by Jana Kask	Winner of Eesti otsib superstaari 2009	Succeeded by Liis Lemsalu
