= Põhjamaa =

Estonian song

"Põhjamaa" (Estonian for Northern/Nordic Land/Country), also "Laul Põhjamaast" (Estonian for Song of the Northern/Nordic Land/Country), is a song by Enn Vetemaa to a melody by Ülo Vinter, originally for an Estonian musical adaptation of Pippi Longstocking. The song has been recurring in Estonian Song Festivals. "Põhjamaa" was considered by some to be a good candidate for the anthem of Republic of Estonia after it reestablished its independence but it was deemed unfitting as its subject was Sweden, not Estonia.

== Lyrics ==
Estonian original

Põhjamaa, me sünnimaa,
tuulte ja tuisuööde maa,
range maa ja kange maa,
virmaliste maa.

Põhjamaa, me sünnimaa,
iidsete kuuselaante maa,
lainte maa ja ranna maa,
sind ei jäta ma.

On lumme uppund metsasalud,
vaiksed taliteed,
nii hellad on su aisakellad,
lumel laulvad need.

Põhjamaa, me sünnimaa,
karmide meeste kallis maa,
taplemiste tallermaa,
püha kodumaa.

Põhjamaa, me sünnimaa,
hinges sind ikka kannan ma,
kaugeil teil sa kallis meil,
sind ei jäta ma.

English translation

Northern land, our birth-land,
a land of wind and blizzard nights,
a rough land and a tough land,
a land of northern lights.

Northern land, our birth-land,
a land of ancient firwoods,
a land of waves and beaches,
never shall I leave you.

There's snow drowned spinneys,
quiet snowpaths,
so tender are your sleigh bells,
singing on the snow.

Northern land, our birth-land,
a dear land of tough men,
battlefield of carnage,
the holy homeland.

Northern land, our birth-land,
in soul I'll keep carrying you,
so dear to us on foreign trails,
never shall I leave you.
