= Koit Toome =

Estonian singer (born 1979)

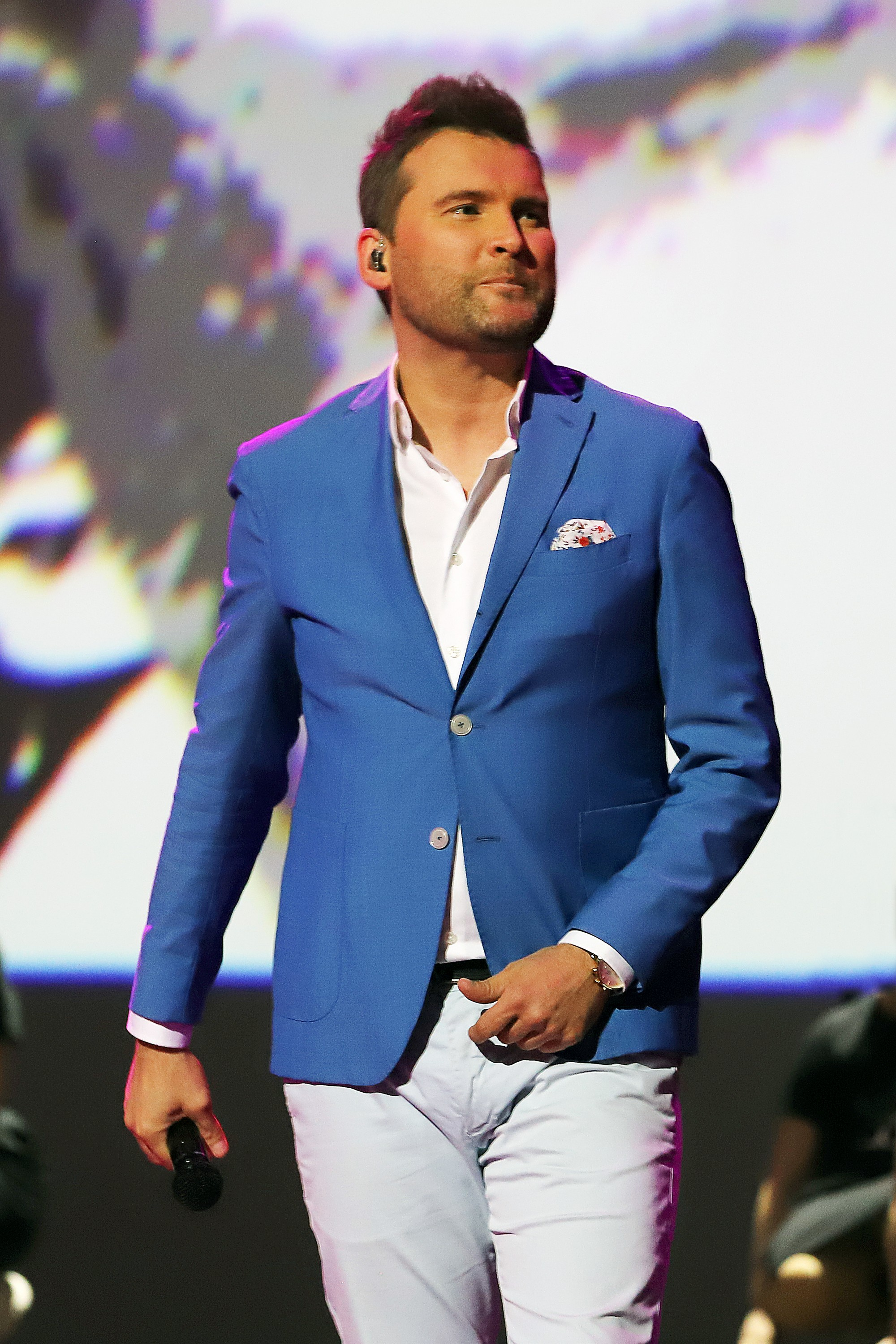
- Toome performing in 2022

Background information
- Born: 3 January 1979 (age 47); Tallinn, then part of Estonian SSR, Soviet Union
- Genres: Pop
- Occupations: Singer; voice actor
- Instruments: Vocal; piano; accordion
- Years active: 1995–present

Koit Toome (born 3 January 1979) is an Estonian singer and musical actor.

He has represented Estonia in the Eurovision Song Contest twice. In 1998, he finished 12th with the song "Mere lapsed". In 2017, he sang a duet with Laura Põldvere, entitled "Verona".

== Career ==
Koit Toome was discovered in the music school in 1994 by the music producer Mikk Targo who was initially planning to launch a solo career for Koit. It later turned out that Koit's schoolmate and initial backing vocalist Sirli Hiius harmonized perfectly with Koit. Due to this, Koit's solo turned into a pop duo, Code One, which enjoyed a successful run of top hits that over the years have become evergreens. Toome and Hiius sometimes nevertheless perform together, despite having called the active years as a singing duo to an end years ago.

In 1998, Koit Toome represented Estonia at the Eurovision Song Contest, held in Birmingham. He finished 12th with 36 points with the song "Mere lapsed". The same year he recorded his debut solo album of mostly self-penned material on it. Toome has released five albums all together, both as a solo artist, and with Code One. His latest studio album, "Kaugele siit" ("Far from here") was released in March 2010.

In 2007, Koit Toome was declared as the winner of Tantsud tähtedega (Dancing with the Stars) with his partner on floor, Kertu Tänav.

Koit Toome has also embarked on a voice acting career, dubbing animated films. He provided the Estonian voice for Lightning McQueen in the Disney movie Cars among others.

In 2017, Koit Toome and Laura Põldvere won Eesti Laul with the duet "Verona." They thereafter represented Estonia in the Eurovision Song Contest 2017 in Kyiv, Ukraine. The duo failed to advance to the Grand Final and finished in 14th place (placing 6th in the televoting & 17th with the juries), despite being a big fan favourite and seen as likely qualifiers beforehand, being 5th in the 2nd semi-final by odds and 5th by OGAE voting overall.

Toome attempted to represent Estonia in the Eurovision Song Contest 2021 by participating in Eesti Laul 2021 with his song "We Could Have Been Beautiful". He placed fourth in the national final.

== Musical theatre ==
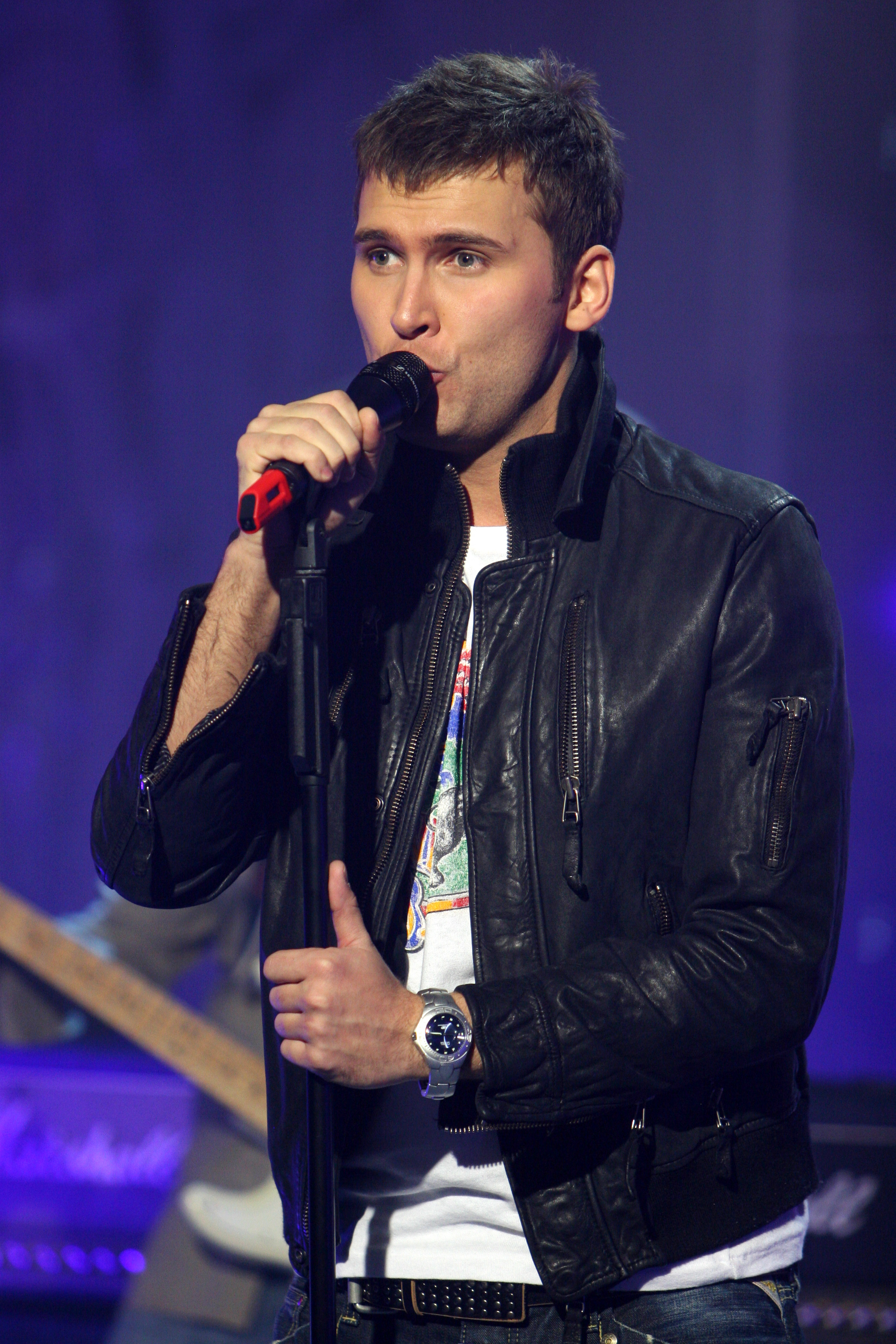
Toome performing in 2007

Koit Toome is professionally active in musical theatre. As a leading actor, he has so far played the roles of the protagonists only with no exception in his native Estonia, and also with touring companies.

His debut, Alfred in Tanz der Vampire (Tallinn, 2000) was shortly followed by Marius of Les Misérables (Tallinn, 2001), Chris in Miss Saigon (Tallinn, 2002, reprised in Helsinki City Theatre) and Tony in West Side Story (Tartu, 2005). Leading roles in Chess, Rent and Hair were to follow in Estonia and (Germany).

In Endla Theatre in Pärnu, he played the lead in Peter Quilter's musical Boyband, depicting the life of a fictional boyband Freedom. The show would stay on stage for a successful run of 100 performances, and for 5 seasons.

Koit Toome was starring as Raoul in The Phantom of the Opera in theatre Vanemuine (2014–2016), but he took over the leading role of "Phantom" from its originator, the Norwegian tenor Stephen Hansen for the final run of performances in 2016/2017 and 2020/2021. Koit Toome continues at the Vanemuine theatre for the Estonian revival of Les Misérables, now cast as Jean Valjean. It premiered in November 2017.

== Personal life ==
Koit's uncle Indrek Toome was the Prime Minister of Estonia from 1988 to 1990.

== Discography ==
=== Singles ===
==== As lead artist ====
Title	Year	Peak chart positions	Album
Title	Year	EST	Album
"Valged ööd" (with Getter Jaani)	2011	1	Rockefeller Street
"Talveöö" (with Getter Jaani and Karl Madis)	2011	—	Jõuluvalgus
"Rannamaja" (with Getter Jaani)	2014	1	DNA
"Verona" (with Laura)	2017	2	Non-album single
"—" denotes a recording that did not chart or was not released in that territory.

==== As featured artist ====
Title	Year	Album
"Pole Piiri" (Metsakutsu featuring Koit Toome)	2016	Kuhu Koer On Maetud
"Your Stories" (Cartoon featuring Koit Toome)	2017	NCS: Colors

== Filmography ==
=== Dubbing ===
Year	Film	Role	Notes
2006	Cars	Lightning McQueen	Estonian voice-dub

Awards and achievements
Preceded by Maarja-Liis Ilus with "Keelatud maa"	Estonia in the Eurovision Song Contest; 1998	Succeeded by Evelin Samuel and Camille with "Diamond of Night"
Preceded by Jüri Pootsmann with "Play"	Estonia in the Eurovision Song Contest (with Laura Põldvere); 2017	Succeeded by Elina Nechayeva with "La forza"
