= Liis Lemsalu =

Estonian singer

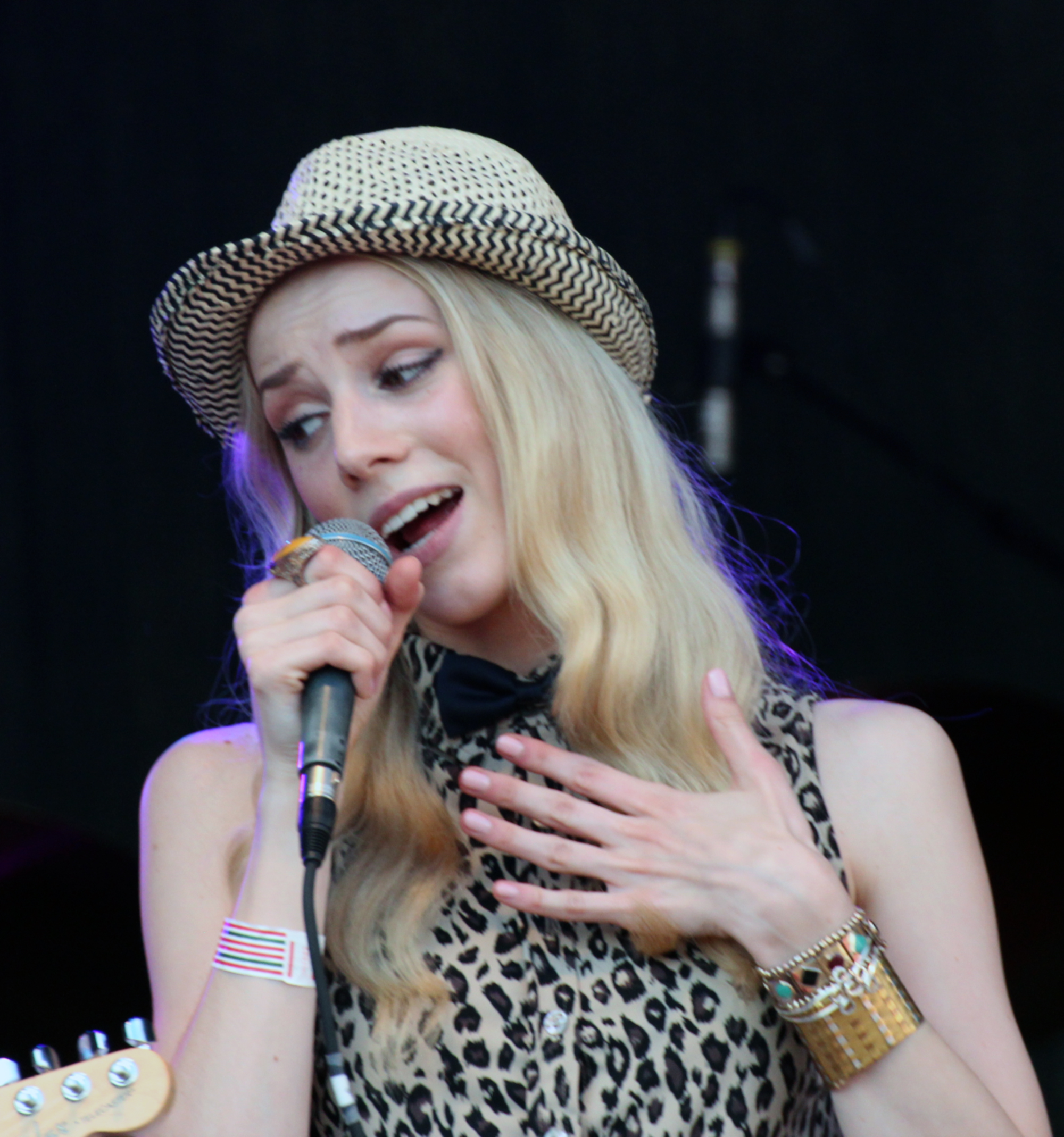
- Lemsalu in 2012

Background information
- Born: 20 October 1992 (age 33); Pärnu, Estonia
- Genres: Pop; soul; R&B
- Occupation: Singer
- Years active: 2011–present
- Label: Warner music

Liis Lemsalu (born October 20, 1992, in Pärnu, Estonia) is an Estonian singer.

== 2011: Eesti otsib superstaari ==
Lemsalu rose to fame as the winner of the fourth season of Eesti otsib superstaari, the Estonian version of Idol series. After winning, Liis went on tour with other participants of Eesti otsib superstaari and released a single "Kõnnime seda teed" together with the runner-up of the show, Artjom Savitski. She was then signed to Universal Music Group.

=== Songs performed in Eesti otsib superstaari ===
Week	Title	Original Artist	Result
Semi-finals
Semi-final: Week 1	"Vanaisa kiri"	Indigolapsed	Jury Wildcard
Semi-final: Week 3	"At Last"	Etta James	Qualified to the Finals
Finals
Week 1	"I Have Nothing"	Whitney Houston	Safe
Week 2	"15 magamata ööd"	Eda-Ines Etti	Safe
Week 3	"I Wanna Dance with Somebody (Who Loves Me)"	Whitney Houston	Safe
Week 4	"Proud Mary"	Tina Turner	Bottom three
Week 5	"L-O-V-E"	Nat King Cole	Bottom three
Week 6	"Smells Like Teen Spirit"	Nirvana	Safe
Week 6	"Sajab lund"	Maarja-Liis Ilus	Safe
Week 7	"Üle tumeda vee"	Smilers	Safe
Week 7	"Den fyrste song eg høyra fekk"	Per Sivle	Safe
Week 8	"Messiah"	George Frideric Handel	Safe
Week 8	"Someone Like You"	Adele	Safe
Finale	"At Last"	Etta James	Victory
Finale	"Mis maa see on?"	Siiri Sisask	Victory
Finale	"Crazy in Love"	Beyoncé	Victory

== 2012-2015: First album Liis Lemsalu, Eesti Laul & first EP RULES ==
After the success of her first singles such as "Shining Star" or "Wanna Get Down", Liis Lemsalu released her first album : Liis Lemsalu. One of the songs was sent to Eesti Laul, Estonia's selection for the Eurovision Song Contest four times. "Made Up My Mind" was chosen among the 20 semi-finalist of Eesti Laul 2012 and reached the final finishing second of her semi-final with a first place in the jury ranking and a second place with the televote. In the final, she finished 5th with 12 points. After this success she tried again a year later, with "Uhuu" but was eliminated in the second semi-final of Eesti Laul 2013, finishing 9th with 10 points.

She came back two years later for Eesti Laul 2015 with Egert Milder and the song "Hold On", but once again failed to qualify. She finished 7th in the semi-final with 9 points. After Eesti Laul, she released her first EP RULES with containing only songs in English like her Eesti Laul song, "Got To Be" (English version of "Rohkem Värve") or the successful single "Breaking the rules".

== 2016-present: Second album +1 & Eesti Laul ==
After 2015, Lemsalu gained a lot of popularity after her biggest hit "Sinu Ees" ("In Front Of You" in English) was released in May 2016. The song was awarded Song of the Year by Radio Elmar after spending 14 weeks consecutively at the top of their rankings.

In late 2016, she was announced as part of the line up of Eesti Laul 2017 with the song "Keep Running". She qualified for the final at the end of the first round, finishing fourth, and finished 7th in the final with 10 points. Lemsalu also made an Estonian version of the song "Aeg on Käes". Then, she released her second album "+1" which contained all her single since from 2016 and 2017 and five new songs, most of the singles became or were already big radio hits.

Since "+1", she released "Tähed Me Jalge All", "Kehakeel", "Halb või hea" and "Doomino" with the singer Stefan. In 2021, she signed with Warner Music and released the song "Magusvalus".

== Discography ==
=== Album ===
- Liis Lemsalu (2011)
- RULES (EP) (26 November 2015)
- +1 (30 November 2017)

=== Singles ===
- "Kõnnime seda teed" (15 June 2011; together with Artjom Savitski)
- "Shining Star" (22 September 2011)
- "Wanna Get Down" (3 November 2011)
- "Täitugu soovid" (28 November 2011)
- "Made Up My Mind" (Eesti Laul 2012)
- "Lighting in the Bottle" (13 September 2012)
- "Uhhuu" (Eesti Laul 2013)
- "Rohkem värve" / "Got To Be" (English version) (2 September 2013)
- "Sulle võin kindel olla" (3 October 2013)
- "That Kinda" (5 May 2014)
- "Slowly Dying" (4 November 2014)
- "Hold On" featuring Egert Milder (Eesti Laul 2015 semi-finalist 7 out of 10 with 9 points)
- "Fire" (25 May 2015)
- "Breaking the Rules" (12 November 2015)
- "Sinu ees" ("In Front of You" in English) (31 May 2016)
- "Keep Running" / "Aeg on Käes" (Estonian version) (Eesti Laul 2017 Finalist, 7 out of 10 with 10 points)
- "Sinuga koos" ("Next to You" in English) (29 March 2017)
- "Ei Peatu" (1 September 2017)
- "Püüab meid" (27 November 2017)
- "Süda taob" with Ott Lepland (26 April 2018)
- "Tähed Me Jalge All" (June 2019)
- "Kehakeel" (September 2019)
- "Halb või hea" (25 August 2020)
- "Magusvalus" (14 October 2021)

== Personal life ==
Lemsalu studied at the Tallinn Nõmme Gymnasium. She is a daughter of a former professional football player Marek Lemsalu.

Awards and achievements
Preceded by Ott Lepland	Winner of Eesti otsib superstaari 2011	Succeeded by Rasmus Rändvee
