= Artjom Savitski =

Estonian singer and audio technician

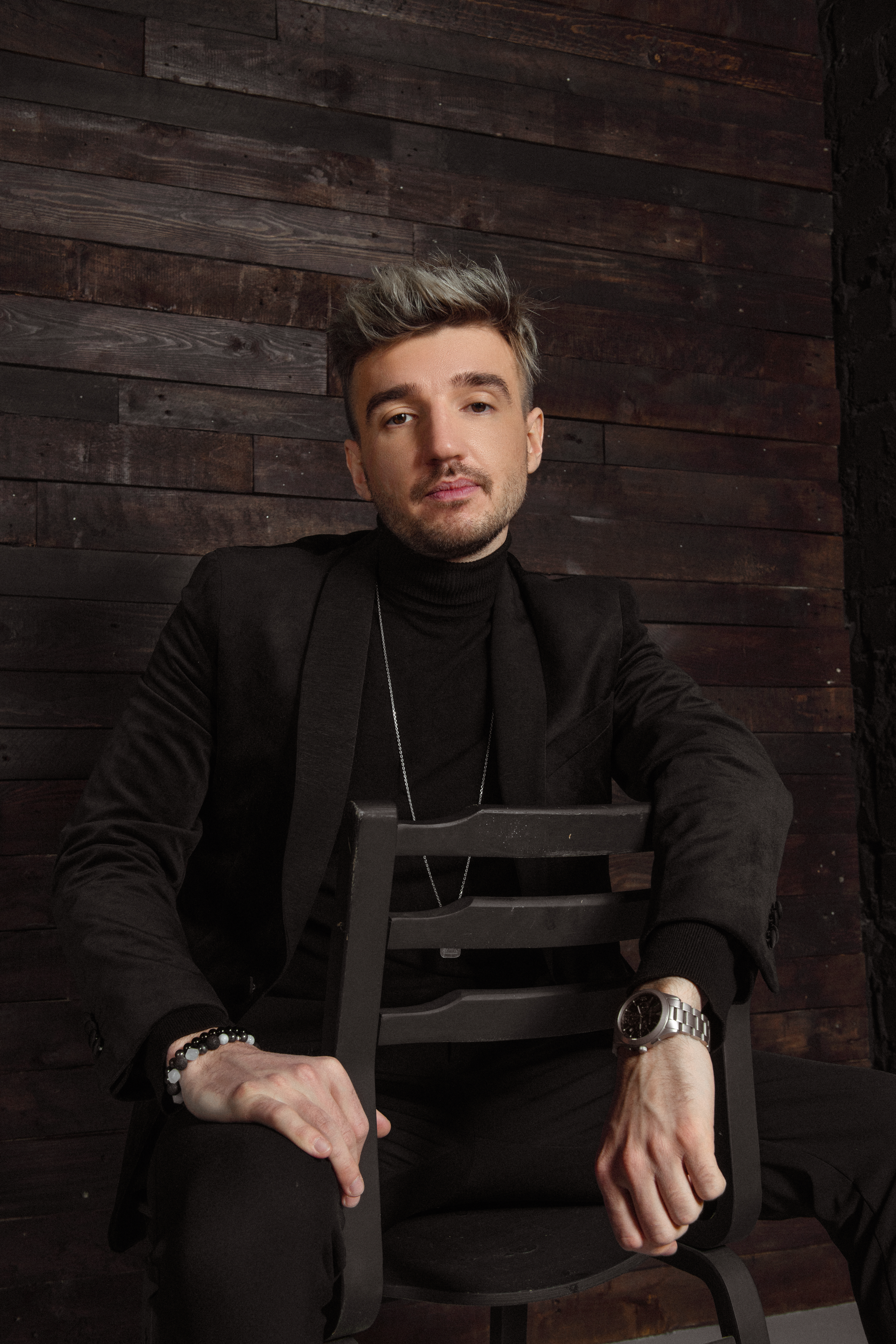
Artjom Savitski

Artjom Savitski (born 27 January 1992 in Tallinn) is an Estonian singer and audio technician. He graduated from Tallinn University of Technology where he specialised in telecommunications. He has worked at Jüri Pihel's studio as an audio technician. In 2011, he achieved second place in the television program Eesti otsib superstaari.
