= Rockefeller Street (album) =

2011 album by Getter Jaani

Studio album by Getter Jaani
- Released: 2 May 2011
- Recorded: 2010–2011
- Genres: Dance-pop; electropop
- Label: Moonwalk
- Producer: Sven Lõhmus

Getter Jaani chronology
| Parim Päev EP (2010) | Rockefeller Street (2011) | DNA (2014) |

Singles from Rockefeller Street
- 1. "Rockefeller Street" Released: 24 January 2011; 2. "Valged ööd" Released: 23 May 2011; 3. "Me kõik jääme vanaks" Released: 30 October 2011

Rockefeller Street is the debut album by Estonian pop singer Getter Jaani. It was released on 2 May 2011. The first single released from the album was "Rockefeller Street", which was released on 24 January 2011. The second single released from the album was "Valged ööd", which was released on 23 May 2011.

== Singles ==
- "Rockefeller Street" is the first single released from the album. Jaani represented Estonia with the song at the Eurovision Song Contest 2011 held in Düsseldorf, Germany. In the final, she scored 44 points and finished in 24th place. Reached #3 on the Estonian charts.
- "Valged ööd" is the second single released from the album. The song features vocals from Estonian singer Koit Toome and was released on 23 May 2011. Reached #1 on the Estonian charts.
- "Me kõik jääme vanaks" is the third single from the album. The song features guitar from Mihkel Raud and was released on 30 October 2011.

== Track listing ==
- All songs written and arranged by Sven Lõhmus, except where noted.

| No. | Title | Length |
|---|---|---|
| 1. | "Rockefeller Street" | 3:13 |
| 2. | "Valged ööd" | 3:50 |
| 3. | "Robot" | 3:58 |
| 4. | "Grammofon" | 3:38 |
| 5. | "Must klaver" | 3:13 |
| 6. | "Parim päev (written by Heini Vaikmaa, Sven Lõhmus)" | 3:36 |
| 7. | "Me kõik jääme vanaks" (feat. Mihkel Raud) | 4:40 |
| 8. | "Saladus" | 3:31 |
| 9. | "Teater" | 3:23 |
| 10. | "Ebareaalne" | 3:21 |
| 11. | "Alles alguses" | 4:45 |
| 12. | "Rockefeller Street" (Remix) | 3:50 |

== Charts ==
Weekly chart performance
| Chart (2011) | Peak position |
|---|---|
| Estonian Albums (Eesti müügitabel) | 3 |

== Release history ==
| Country | Date | Format | Label |
|---|---|---|---|
| Worldwide | 2 May 2011 | Digital download | Moonwalk |
| Estonia | 2 May 2011 | CD | Moonwalk |
