= Rockefeller Street =

2011 song by Getter Jaani

Single by Getter Jaani

from the album Rockefeller Street
- Released: 24 January 2011
- Genre: Pop; Dance; Europop; Bubblegum dance; Doo-wop
- Length: 3:13
- Label: Moonwalk
- Composer(s): Sven Lõhmus
- Lyricist(s): Sven Lõhmus

Getter Jaani singles chronology
"Grammofon" (2010)	"Rockefeller Street" (2011)	"Valged ööd" (2011)

Alternative cover
- Nightcore remix cover

Music video
- "Rockefeller Street" on YouTube

Eurovision Song Contest 2011 entry
- Country: Estonia
- Artist(s): Getter Jaani
- Language: English
- Composer(s): Sven Lõhmus
- Lyricist(s): Sven Lõhmus

Finals performance
- Semi-final result: 9th
- Semi-final points: 60
- Final result: 24th
- Final points: 44

Entry chronology
- ◄ "Siren" (2010)
- "Kuula" (2012) ►

Official performance video
- "Rockefeller Street" (Grand Final) on YouTube

"Rockefeller Street" is a song by Estonian singer and actress Getter Jaani. It was released on 24 January 2011 by Moonwalk Records as the lead single for Jaani's debut studio album, Rockefeller Street. Written by Sven Lõhmus, "Rockefeller Street" was the Estonian entry at the Eurovision Song Contest 2011, held in Düsseldorf, where it placed 24th, one away from last place in the grand final.

While the critical response to the song was positive, the Eurovision performance was negatively received. "Rockefeller Street" drew commercial success, peaking at number three in Estonia. Years after the song was performed at Eurovision, an unofficial nightcore version of the song became an Internet meme, leading to an increase in streams of the song and Jaani releasing an official nightcore version of the song.

== Background and composition ==
"Rockefeller Street" was written by Estonian songwriter Sven Lõhmus. He had previously written both Suntribe's "Let's Get Loud" and Urban Symphony's "Rändajad", the Estonian entries for the Eurovision Song Contest in 2005 and 2009, respectively. In an interview with the Maltese Eurovision fan podcast Eurovision Radio International, Getter Jaani described "Rockefeller Street" as a "fairy tale", with the street representing "[where] all your dreams can come true and you can be whoever you want to be". In the same interview, while Jaani admitted the place was imaginary, she stated that she had felt that she had been there in her imagination numerous times. In another interview, Jaani said that on the street, ballerinas danced to "Swan Lake", and the place was near a river adorned with pearls and gems. According to ESCToday writer Marcus Klier, the "up-tempo dance song" tells a story about a night out partying in New York City, with its title referring to the Rockefeller family.

"Rockefeller Street" was officially announced to compete in Eesti Laul 2011, Eesti Rahvusringhääling (ERR)'s national final to select Estonia's representative for the Eurovision Song Contest 2011, on 16 December 2010. According to Lõhmus, the song was not created specifically for the Eurovision Song Contest; it was only entered into Eesti Laul 2011 as a way to promote the single itself. On 24 January 2011, it was released as a digital download along with all other songs competing in Eesti Laul 2011.

== Critical reception ==
Editors of The Edge, the University of Southampton's entertainment magazine, described "Rockefeller Street" as "catchy" and said the song could do well in the Eurovision Song Contest despite a lackluster performance; they wrote that the song was going after the "pity vote" by using cheap props. Silvi Vrait, the Estonian representative for the Eurovision Song Contest 1994, thought that the song could do well in the contest, considering it "nice and happy... just right for Eurovision". Katri Soe-Surén, writing for the German newspaper Süddeutsche Zeitung, gave "Rockefeller Street" a positive review, saying that it was comparable to a song written by Lady Gaga or Madonna.

In the months heading into the Eurovision Song Contest 2011, "Rockefeller Street" was considered one of the favorites to win the contest based on betting odds. On the first set of betting odds released on 15 March, Jaani was third in the odds, only behind France's Amaury Vassili and Norway's Stella Mwangi. By 31 March, she increased to second place. Days before the second semi-final, Jaani decreased back to third place for the overall contest, but was considered the favorite to the win the semi-final.

== Eurovision Song Contest ==
=== Eesti Laul 2011 ===
Estonia's broadcaster Eesti Rahvusringhääling (ERR) organized a 20-entry competition, Eesti Laul 2011 with two semi-finals culminating into a grand final to select its entrant for the Eurovision Song Contest 2011. The two semi-finals were held on 12 and 19 February, and the final was held on 26 February. The winning song in the final was selected over two rounds of voting: the first round results selected the top three songs via a combination of jury and public voting, while the second round (superfinal) determined the winner solely by public televoting.

"Rockefeller Street" was officially announced to compete in the competition on 16 December 2010, on the Eesti Televisioon (ETV) entertainment program Ringvaade. It was placed into the first semi-final, where it managed to qualify to the grand final in first place. In the grand final, she advanced to the superfinal along with Outloudz's "I Wanna Meet Bob Dylan". In the superfinal, Jaani managed to garner 28,102 votes, over 10,000 more than Outloudz's song, winning the Estonian spot for the Eurovision Song Contest 2011.

=== At Eurovision ===
The Eurovision Song Contest 2011 took place at the Düsseldorf Arena in Düsseldorf, Germany. It consisted of two semi-finals held on 10 and 12 May, respectively, and the final on 14 May 2011. According to Eurovision rules, all countries, except the host and the "Big Five" (France, Germany, Italy, Spain, and the United Kingdom), were required to qualify from one semi-final to compete in the final; the top ten countries from each semi-final progressed to the final. In a press conference held on 17 January 2011, a special allocation press conference was held to determine which countries would perform in each semi-final. Estonia was placed into the second semi-final, performing in the second half of the show.

For its Eurovision performance, "Rockefeller Street" was altered, with minor changes being made to accommodate the three-minute time limit that the Eurovision Song Contest had set for each performance. Jaani performed the song 15th in the second semi-final, after Romania's Hotel FM and before Belarus' Anastasia Vinnikova. Minor changes to Jaani's performance were also made; Jaani wore an all-pink dress and carried a cloth that turned into a staff, with a skyscraper background added on LED screens that were made to represent the Manhattan skyline. The male background dancers described to be "symbolic guardians and protectors of the fairy princess Getter". "Rockefeller Street" finished ninth, receiving 60 points and securing a spot in the grand final.

Jaani performed a repeat of her performance in the grand final on 14 May. The song was performed in eighth, after Sweden's Eric Saade and before Greece's Loukas Yorkas. The song received negative reactions. Ithaka Maria, an Estonian television host who competed against Jaani in Eesti Laul 2011, reacted negatively to the Eurovision performance: "If the Estonian team set itself the biggest goal of getting to the final, it was achieved [...] to say that Estonia did well in [Eurovision] is, to put it mildly, ridiculous!" Writers for The Guardian, Heidi Stephens and Stuart Heritage, gave the performance a highly negative review, writing, "Christ alive, what is THIS?... [she looks] like a satanic doll standing on a set made out of rubbish cardboard boxes with buildings drawn on them... 'Everything is a little bit weird now', she sings, and she's not wrong."

After the results were announced, Jaani finished 24th with 44 points, only ahead of Switzerland's Anna Rossinelli. No country gave the song 12 points; the maximum given to the song was seven, given by Finland, Ireland, and Lithuania. Õhtuleht's Karoliina Vasli described the result as "disappointing", and said that "hopes were not fulfilled". In response to her finish, Jaani said that she did not feel any disappointment on her result, instead praising on the fact that she was able to get to the grand final.

== Internet phenomenon ==
Years after the contest, an unofficial version of "Rockefeller Street", edited to have a faster tempo and higher pitch, became an internet phenomenon in Asia; 1.5 million videos using that song had been posted to TikTok by 9 January 2019 according to ERR. The song was later featured on a February 2019 episode of American talk show The Tonight Show Starring Jimmy Fallon. An official nightcore version of the song was eventually released on 14 December 2018.

Sven Lõhmus, the writer of "Rockefeller Street", made positive remarks on the song's popularity despite a lack of royalties. He felt royalties were not the most important thing for him, instead praising how a relatively unknown Estonian pop song had made it into mainstream pop culture: "This is an intense precedent... it is unlikely that any Estonian songs become so popular around the world that Asians and Americans dance to them." He also said that due to the song's popularity, many would ask "who wrote the story", saying that "they will eventually find me". By early 2020, Lõhmus and Jaani stated hopes of signing with a major American record company.

== Track listing ==
- Digital download (Note: This acts as a summary of all versions of the song released for digital download.)
1. "Rockefeller Street" – 3:13

== Charts ==
Chart (2011)	Peak position
Belgium (Ultratip Bubbling Under Flanders)	40
Estonia (Top 40)	3
Ireland (IRMA)	44
UK Indie (OCC)	33

== Release history ==
Country	Date	Format(s)	Label	Ref.
Various	24 January 2011	Digital download	Moonwalk	
Various	14 December 2018	Digital download (Nightcore)	Moonwalk	
