= Robin Juhkental =

Estonian singer (born 1988)

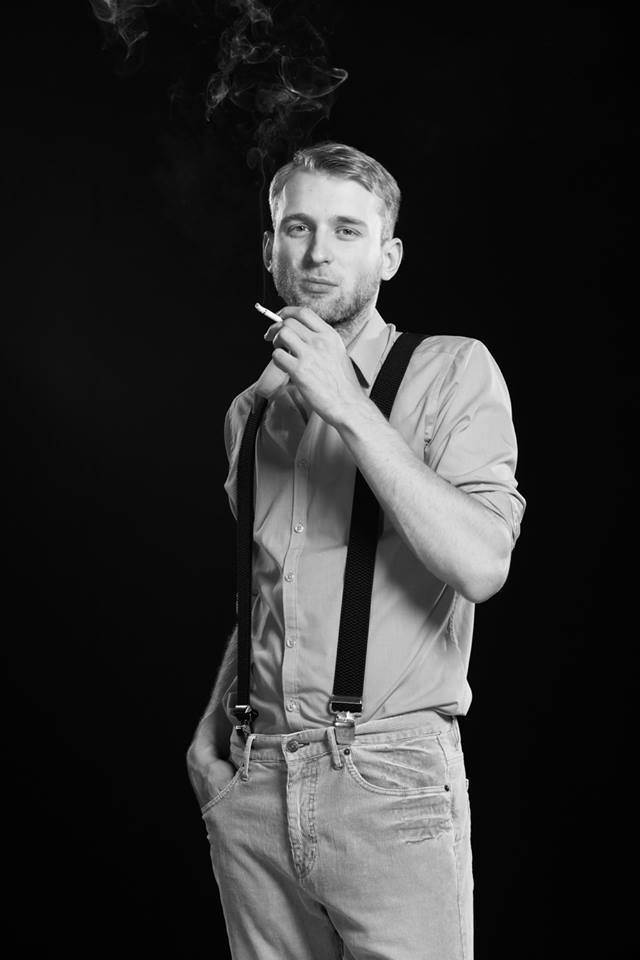

Background information
- Born: 20 May 1988 (age 37); Tallinn, then part of Estonian SSR, Soviet Union
- Genres: Electropop
- Occupation: Singer-songwriter
- Instrument: Vocals
- Labels: Universal Music, Mortimer Snerd (previously)
- Website: myspace.com/malcolmlincoln

Robin Juhkental (born 20 May 1988) is an Estonian singer. He is the frontman of Malcolm Lincoln.

Juhkental studied at Kivimäe põhikool and Tallinna Nõmme Gümnaasium. He has also studied road engineering in Tallinn University of Applied Sciences.

Juhkental has never taken any singing lessons. He participated as a contestant in the Kaks takti ette (2007) and Eesti otsib superstaari (2009) television shows. Malcolm Lincoln, along with a group of backing vocalists called Manpower 4, won the competition Eesti Laul 2010 with the song "Siren" and represented Estonia in the Eurovision Song Contest 2010. Malcolm Lincoln returned in Eesti Laul 2012 with the song "Bye", placing 7th in the semifinal. Juhkental also participated in Eesti Laul 2015 with the song "Troubles", which reached the finals. In 2023, he participated in Eesti Laul again with the song "Kurbuse matused" but finished in last place in the second semi-final and was not selected in the second chance round, thus failing to qualify for the final.

Juhkental employs a surrealist approach to writing song lyrics: he first babbles, records the nonsense and then thinks about which words the sounds resemble. His lyrics are mostly in English. He believes he is not a good enough poet to write lyrics in Estonian, but considers English to be so messy that lyrics written in it will seem less bad than they would in Estonian.
