= Estonia in the Eurovision Song Contest 2010 =

- Eurovision Song Contest 2010
- Participating broadcaster: Eesti Rahvusringhääling (ERR)
- Country: Estonia
- Selection process: Eesti Laul 2010
- Selection date: 12 March 2010

Competing entry
- Song: "Siren"
- Artist: Malcolm Lincoln
- Songwriters: Robin Juhkental

Placement
- Semi-final result: Failed to qualify (14th)

Participation chronology

Estonia was represented at the Eurovision Song Contest 2010 with the song "Siren", written by Robin Juhkental, and performed by Malcolm Lincoln and Manpower 4. The Estonian participating broadcaster, Eesti Rahvusringhääling (ERR), organised the national final Eesti Laul 2010 in order to select its entry for the contest. Ten songs competed in the national final and the winner was selected over two rounds of voting. In the first round, a jury panel and a public vote selected the top two to qualify to the super final. In the super final, "Siren" performed by Malcolm Lincoln and Manpower 4 was selected as the winner entirely by a public vote.

Estonia was drawn to compete in the first semi-final of the Eurovision Song Contest which took place on 25 May 2010. Performing during the show in position 3, "Siren" was not announced among the top 10 entries of the first semi-final and therefore did not qualify to compete in the final. It was later revealed that Estonia placed fourteenth out of the 17 participating countries in the semi-final with 39 points.

== Background ==
Prior to the 2010 contest, Eesti Televisioon (ETV) until 2007, and Eesti Rahvusringhääling (ERR) since 2008, had participated in the Eurovision Song Contest representing Estonia fifteen times since ETV's first entry in 1994, winning the contest on one occasion: in 2001 with the song "Everybody" performed by Tanel Padar, Dave Benton, and 2XL. Following the introduction of semi-finals for the 2004 contest, Estonia has, to this point, managed to qualify to the final on one occasion. In 2009, "Rändajad" performed by Urban Symphony managed to qualify to the final where the song placed sixth.

As part of its duties as participating broadcaster, ERR organised the selection of its entry in the Eurovision Song Contest and broadcast the event in the country. Following reports in October 2009 that ERR may be forced to withdraw from the 2010 contest in combat to a 7% cut in its spending budget, the broadcaster confirmed its participation on 6 November 2009 after securing funding through a 1.5 million kroon donation by foundation Enterprise Estonia. Since their debut, the Estonian broadcaster has organised national finals that feature a competition among multiple artists and songs in order to select its entry. ERR organised the newly formed Eesti Laul competition in 2009, and on 16 November 2009, it announced the organisation of Eesti Laul 2010 in order to select its 2010 entry.

== Before Eurovision ==
=== Eesti Laul 2010 ===
The logo of Eesti Laul 2010

Eesti Laul 2010 was the second edition of the Estonian national selection Eesti Laul, organised by ERR to select its entry for the Eurovision Song Contest 2010. The competition consisted of a ten-song final on 12 March 2010 at the Nokia Concert Hall in Tallinn, hosted by Ott Sepp and Märt Avandi and broadcast on ETV, via radio on Raadio 2 as well as streamed online at the broadcaster's official website err.ee and the official Eurovision Song Contest website eurovision.tv.

==== Competing entries ====
On 16 November 2009, ERR opened the submission period for artists and composers to submit their entries up until 7 January 2010. All artists and composers were required to have Estonian citizenship or be a permanent resident of Estonia. A record 155 submissions were received by the deadline—breaking the previous record of 110, set during the 2009 edition. An 11-member jury panel selected 10 finalists from the submissions and the selected songs were announced during the ETV entertainment program Ringvaade on 11 January 2010. The selection jury consisted of Ardo Ran Varres (composer), Olavi Paide (producer), Erik Morna (Raadio 2 head of music), Toomas Puna (Raadio Sky+ program director), Ingrid Kohtla (Tallinn Music Week organiser), Helen Sildna (Tallinn Music Week organiser), Owe Petersell (Raadio Elmar chief editor), Meelis Meri (DJ), Koit Raudsepp (Raadio 2 presenter), Siim Nestor (music critic) and Valner Valme (music critic).

Among the competing artists were previous Eurovision Song Contest entrants Lenna Kuurmaa and Piret Järvis (lead singer of Disko 4000), who both represented Switzerland in 2005 as member of the band Vanilla Ninja. Rolf Junior have competed in the previous edition of Eesti Laul. Lenna Kuurmaa's entry was written by Vaiko Eplik, who represented Estonia in 2003 as member of the band Ruffus. On 20 December 2009, "Made Me Cry", written and to have been performed by Nikita Bogdanov, was disqualified from the competition due to the songs being published before 1 September 2009 and replaced with the song "Siren" performed by Malcolm Lincoln and Manpower 4.

Artist	Song	Songwriter(s)
3 Pead	"Poolel teel"	Janek Murd; Erkki Tero
Disko 4000	"Ei usu"	Piret Järvis; Sander Loite; Paul Oja; Kallervo Karu
Groundhog Day	"Teiste seest kõigile"	Tõnn Tobreluts; Tauno Tamm; Keio Münti; Indrek Mällo
Iiris Vesik	"Astronaut"	Iiris Vesik; Ago Teppand
Lenna Kuurmaa	"Rapunzel"	Vaiko Eplik
Malcolm Lincoln and Manpower 4	"Siren"	Robin Juhkental
Marten Kuningas and Mahavok	"Oota mind veel"	Heini Vaikmaa; Oskar Ove
Mimicry	"New"	Timmo Linnas; Kaspar Ehlvest; Ivar Kaine; Kene Vernik; Paul Lepasson
Tiiu Kiik	"The One and Only Love"	Tiiu Kiik
Violina feat. Rolf Junior	"Maagiline päev"	Mihkel Mattisen; Timo Vendt; Rolf Roosalu; Liis Lass

==== Final ====
The final took place on 12 March 2010. Ten songs competed during the show and the winner was selected over two rounds of voting. In the first round, a jury (50%) and public televote (50%) determined the top two entries to proceed to the superfinal. The public vote in the first round registered 18,804 votes. In the superfinal, "Siren" performed by Malcolm Lincoln and Manpower 4 was selected as the winner entirely by a public televote. The public televote in the superfinal registered 22,224 votes. In addition to the performances of the competing entries, Urban Symphony, who represented Estonia in 2009, and the band Metsatöll, performed as the interval acts. The jury panel that voted in the first round of the final consisted of Eda-Ines Etti (singer), Owe Petersell (Raadio Elmar chief editor), Anne Erm (composer), Siim Nestor (music critic), Alar Kotkas (composer), Helen Sildna (Tallinn Music Week organiser), Erik Morna (Raadio 2 head of music), Tanel Padar (singer), Tauno Aints (composer), Silvi Vrait (singer) and Kerli Kõiv (singer).

Final – 12 March 2010
R/O	Artist	Song	Jury		Televote		Total	Place
R/O	Artist	Song	Votes	Points	Votes	Points	Total	Place
1	3 Pead	"Poolel teel"	43	2	348	1	3	10
2	Marten Kuningas and Mahavok	"Oota mind veel"	67	7	1,195	5	12	5
3	Mimicry	"New"	33	1	851	4	5	8
4	Tiiu Kiik	"The One and Only Love"	44	3	636	2	5	9
5	Violina feat. Rolf Junior	"Maagiline päev"	83	9	2,586	8	17	3
6	Disko 4000	"Ei usu"	48	4	657	3	7	7
7	Iiris Vesik	"Astronaut"	64	6	1,792	7	13	4
8	Lenna Kuurmaa	"Rapunzel"	101	10	4,484	10	20	1
9	Groundhog Day	"Teiste seest kõigile"	48	5	1,790	6	11	6
10	Malcolm Lincoln and Manpower 4	"Siren"	74	8	4,465	9	17	2

Detailed Jury Votes
R/O	Song	I. Etti	O. Petersell	A. Erm	S. Nestor	A. Kotkas	H. Sildna	E. Morna	T. Padar	T. Aints	S. Vrait	K. Kõiv	Total
1	"Poolel teel"	4	9	4	6	2	3	5	2	4	3	1	43
2	"Oota mind veel"	5	8	8	7	3	1	7	8	9	7	4	67
3	"New"	2	1	6	1	5	2	3	1	3	1	8	33
4	"The One and Only Love"	1	7	7	3	4	4	6	3	5	2	2	44
5	"Maagiline päev"	9	6	5	8	7	8	10	7	6	8	9	83
6	"Ei usu"	3	3	2	5	6	5	1	6	8	6	3	48
7	"Astronaut"	7	4	1	4	8	6	8	5	2	9	10	64
8	"Rapunzel"	10	10	9	10	9	7	9	10	10	10	7	101
9	"Teiste seest kõigile"	6	5	3	2	1	9	2	4	7	4	5	48
10	"Siren"	8	2	10	9	10	10	4	9	1	5	6	74

Superfinal – 12 March 2010
R/O	Artist	Song	Televote	Place
1	Malcolm Lincoln and Manpower 4	"Siren"	12,001	1
2	Lenna Kuurmaa	"Rapunzel"	10,223	2

== At Eurovision ==
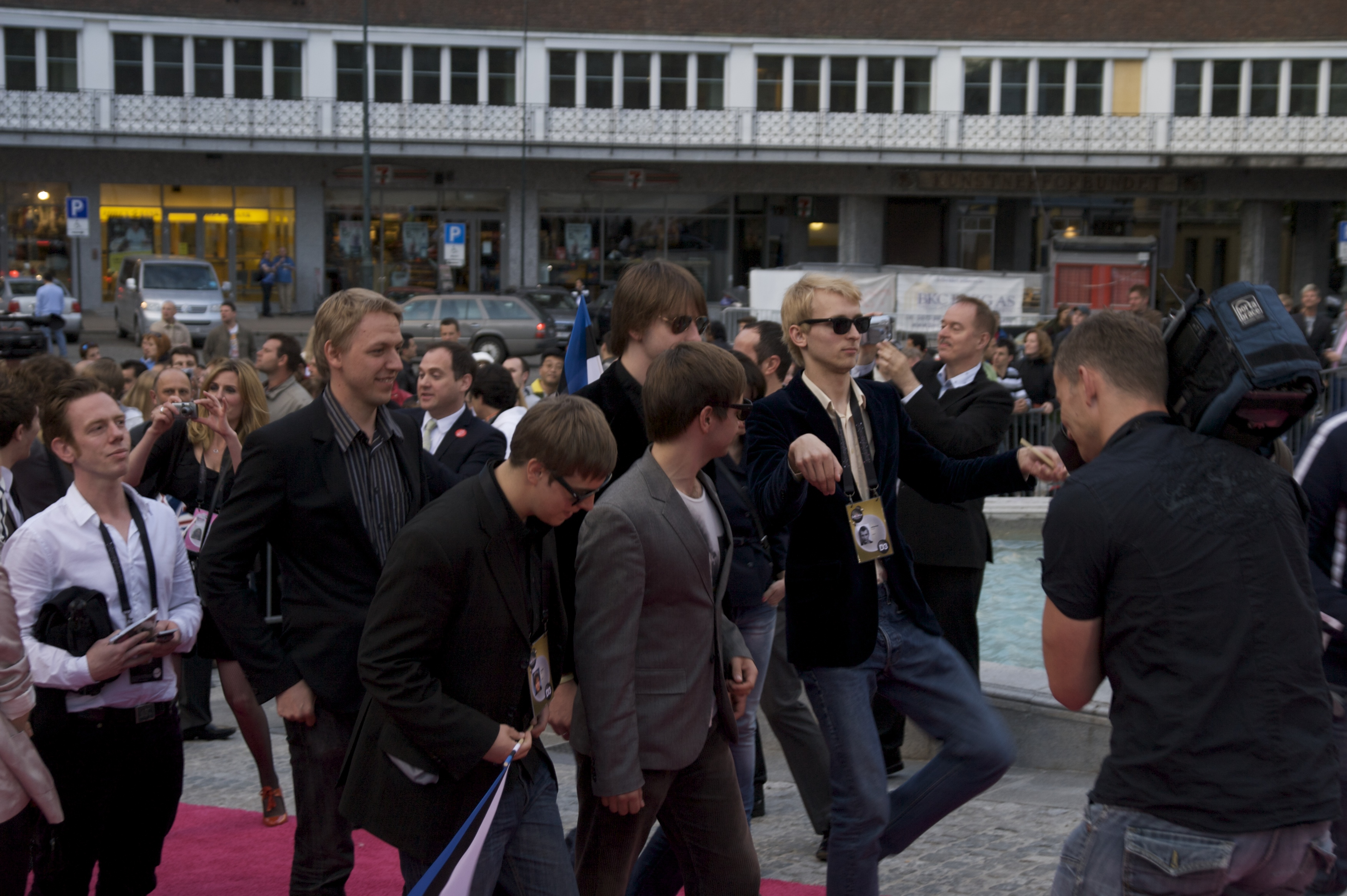
Malcolm Lincoln and Manpower 4 at the Eurovision Opening Party in Oslo

According to Eurovision rules, all nations with the exceptions of the host country and the "Big Four" (France, Germany, Spain, and the United Kingdom) are required to qualify from one of two semi-finals in order to compete for the final; the top ten countries from each semi-final progress to the final. The European Broadcasting Union (EBU) split up the competing countries into six different pots based on voting patterns from previous contests, with countries with favourable voting histories put into the same pot. On 7 February 2010, an allocation draw was held which placed each country into one of the two semi-finals, as well as which half of the show they would perform in. Estonia was placed into the first semi-final, to be held on 25 May 2010, and was scheduled to perform in the first half of the show. The running order for the semi-finals was decided through another draw on 23 March 2010 and Estonia was set to perform in position 3, following the entry from Russia and before the entry from Slovakia.

The two semi-finals and the final were broadcast in Estonia on ETV with commentary by Marko Reikop and Sven Lõhmus. ERR appointed Rolf Junior as its spokesperson to announce the Estonian votes during the final.

=== Semi-final ===
Malcolm Lincoln and Manpower 4 took part in technical rehearsals on 16 and 20 May, followed by dress rehearsals on 24 and 25 May. This included the jury show on 24 May where the professional juries of each country watched and voted on the competing entries.

The Estonian performance featured the lead singer of Malcolm Lincoln, Robin Juhkental, performing on stage and joined by the members of Manpower 4 as backing vocalists and a pianist, all in plum/maroon jackets and wearing silk scarves with the stage displaying dark blue and white lighting with spotlights on the performers. During the performance, Juhkental displayed a special dance routine and concluded the performance by falling down to his knees.

At the end of the show, Estonia was not announced among the top 10 entries in the first semi-final and therefore failed to qualify to compete in the final. It was later revealed that Estonia placed 14th in the semi-final, receiving a total of 39 points.

=== Voting ===
Voting during the three shows consisted of 50 percent public televoting and 50 percent from a jury deliberation. The jury consisted of five music industry professionals who were citizens of the country they represent. This jury was asked to judge each contestant based on: vocal capacity; the stage performance; the song's composition and originality; and the overall impression by the act. In addition, no member of a national jury could be related in any way to any of the competing acts in such a way that they cannot vote impartially and independently. The following members comprised the Estonian jury: Gerli Padar (singer, represented Estonia in 2007), Imre Sooäär (songwriter), Olav Osolin (music critic), Priit Pajusaar (songwriter) and Ewert Sundja (musician).

Following the release of the full split voting by the EBU after the conclusion of the competition, it was revealed that Estonia had placed sixteenth with the public televote and ninth with the jury vote in the first semi-final. In the public vote, Estonia scored 22 points, while with the jury vote, Estonia scored 64 points.

Below is a breakdown of points awarded to Estonia and awarded by Estonia in the first semi-final and grand final of the contest, and the breakdown of the jury voting and televoting conducted during the two shows:

==== Points awarded to Estonia ====
Points awarded to Estonia (Semi-final 1)
Score	Country
12 points	Finland; Latvia
10 points	
8 points	
7 points	
6 points	
5 points	Poland
4 points	Portugal
3 points	
2 points	Iceland
1 point	Albania; Belarus; Bosnia and Herzegovina; Greece

==== Points awarded by Estonia ====
Points awarded by Estonia (Semi-final 1)
Score	Country
12 points	Russia
10 points	Finland
8 points	Belgium
7 points	Iceland
6 points	Latvia
5 points	Portugal
4 points	Belarus
3 points	Malta
2 points	Greece
1 point	Serbia

Points awarded by Estonia (Final)
Score	Country
12 points	Germany
10 points	Russia
8 points	Georgia
7 points	Norway
6 points	Turkey
5 points	Denmark
4 points	Iceland
3 points	Belgium
2 points	Ireland
1 point	France
