= Vaiko Eplik =

Estonian composer and singer

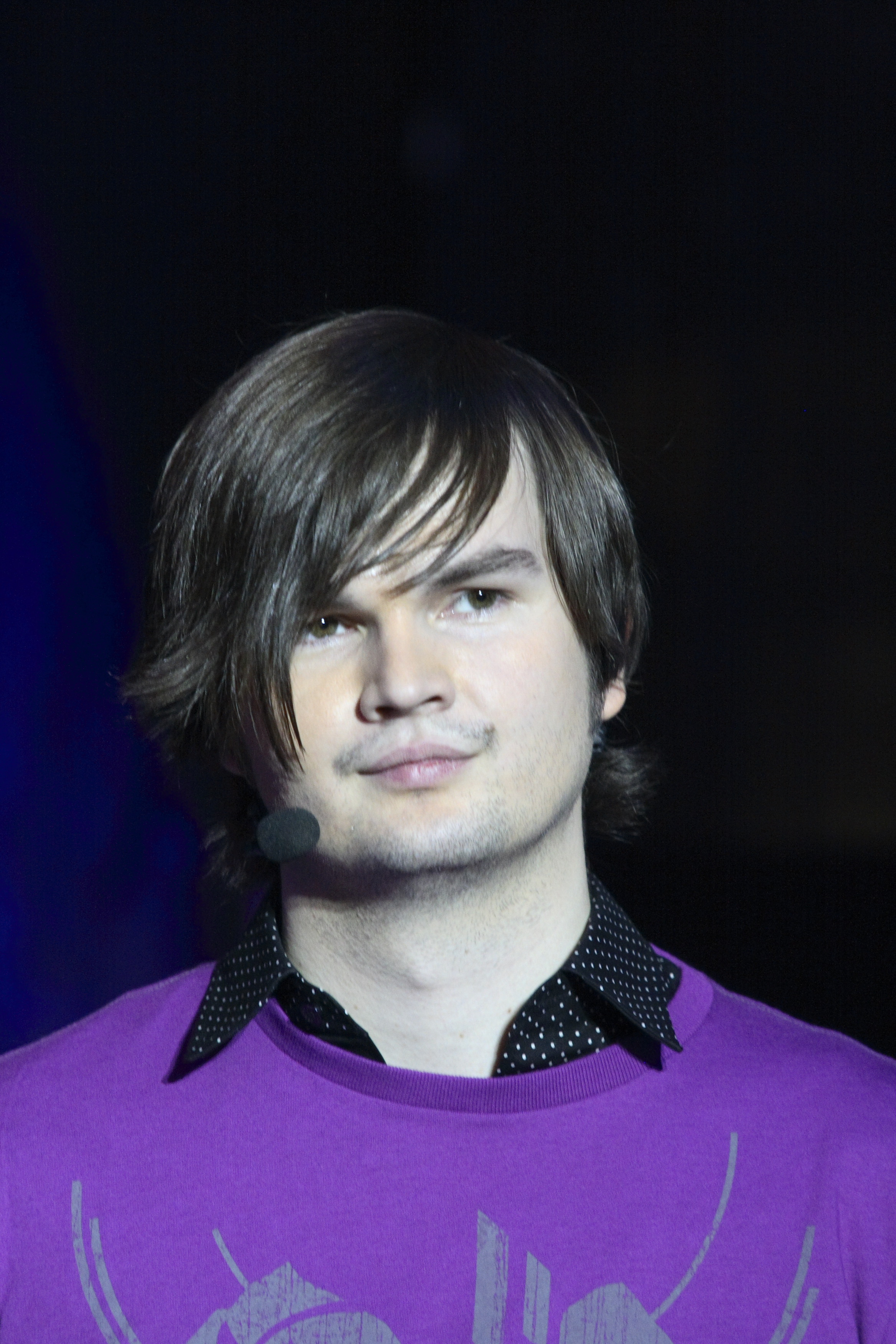
Vaiko Eplik, 2007

Vaiko Eplik (born 1 August 1981) is an independent Estonian pop-composer, producer, singer and multi-instrumentalist.

Eplik was born in Rapla, Estonia, into a music-loving family. Eplik studied music at the Tallinn Music School, specialising in pop-jazz singing and also studied the guitar, which he now teaches. The British Council nominated Eplik for the International Young Music Entrepreneur of the Year award in 2008 in the following words: "Vaiko is a highly creative and engaging individual who is clearly passionate about music. He is obviously a highly influential figure in the Estonian industry. The judges appreciate his integrity and his thought-through artistic approach. He has defined his own business model that reflects his aspirations and expectations and that allows him to quietly champion a different approach."

He has been part of several collectives: Claire's Birthday, Ruffus and Koer. In 2006, Eplik started his solo project under the name Eliit. He has released eight albums, regularly reaching the top of Estonian album charts. In 2014, he released two albums in close sequence, "Nõgesed" ("Nettles") and "Nelgid" ("Carnations"). He has emphasised his aspiration to "earn enough money to get by, and keep being intelligent and free to be creative with music." Eplik is a principled independent artist, producing his music at home and releasing it under his independent record label. In 2006 he commented on it in the following words:"Home-made music has no rival... From now on to in about five years time, record companies will be bankrupt."

He also co-wrote and produced the songs for the debut album of the Estonian singer Lenna Kuurmaa, Lenna, and recently composed music for the Estonian animation "Suur maalritöö" ("The Great Painter"), based on the illustrations of Edgar Valter and released in 2013.

== Discography ==
=== Albums ===
- Vaiko Eplik ja Eliit – 1 (2006)
- Vaiko Eplik ja Eliit – 2 Aastaajad (2007)
- Vaiko Eplik ja Eliit – 3 Kosmoseodüsseia (2008)
- Vaiko Eplik – Neljas (2009)
- Vaiko Eplik & Kristjan Randalu – Kooskõla (2011)
- Vaiko Eplik – V ehk tants klavessiini ümber (2011)
- Vaiko Eplik – Varielu (2012)
- Vaiko Eplik – Nõgesed (2014)
- Vaiko Eplik – Nelgid (2014)
- Vaiko Eplik – Kirevase (2016)
- Vaiko Eplik – Uus karjäär uues linnas (2018)
- Vaiko Eplik – Sireleis (2019)
- Vaiko Eplik - Tilda Ja Tolmuingel (2020)

=== Charted singles ===
Title	Year	Peak chart positions	Album
Title	Year	EST Air.	Album
"Lausu tõtt" (Noëp Remix) (Nublu and Vaiko Eplik featuring Noëp)	2025	32	Non-album single

=== Collaborations ===
- Claire's Birthday – Venus (2000)
- Claire's Birthday – City Loves (2001)
- Claire's Birthday – Future Is Now (2003)
- Ruffus – Lessons in Pop (2005)
- Koer – Pure (2004)
- Lenna Kuurmaa – Lenna (2010)
