= Channel 6 =

Channel 6 may refer to:

== Television and radio channels, networks and stations ==
- Channel 6 (El Salvador), a Salvadoran television channel owned by Telecorporación Salvadoreña
- Channel 6 (Ireland), an Irish television channel (2006–2009)
- Channel 6 (Israel), an Israeli kids cable television channel
- Channel 6 (Korea), flagship station of South Korean television and radio network Seoul Broadcasting System
- Channel 6 – Bariloche, a television station in San Carlos de Bariloche, Argentina
- Channel 6 (San Rafael, Argentina)
- CCTV-6, a Chinese television channel
- CCN TV6, television channel on Trinidad and Tobago
- CNS TV 6, a Guyanese television channel
- RTV 6, a television station in Indianapolis, Indiana, United States
- SBS6, a commercial TV channel in the Netherlands
- Six TV, a former television channel in the United Kingdom
- Tokyo Broadcasting System Television and Japan News Network members TV station in Japan
- TV6 (Estonia), a television channel broadcasting to Estonia
- TV6 (Latvia), a television channel broadcasting to Latvia
- TV6 (Lithuania), a television channel broadcasting to Lithuania
- TV6 (Poland), a Polish television channel
- TV6 (French TV channel), a defunct French television channel
- WRTV channel 6, an ABC-affiliated television station in Indianapolis, Indiana, United States
- Multimedios Televisión, a Mexican regional television network broadcasting on virtual channel 6 and branding as "Canal Seis"
- 3e, a television channel in Ireland, known as Channel 6 from 2006 to 2009
- Canal 6 (Chile), a defunct Chilean television station
- Canal 6 (Nicaraguan TV channel), a Nicaraguan television channel
- Repretel 6, a Costa Rican television channel
- 6'eren, a Danish pay television channel
- TVNZ 6, a defunct New Zealand television channel
- ViuTVsix, a Hong Kong English-language television channel
- Super Six (TV channel), an Italian television channel
- Channel Six Dundee, a defunct television station in Dundee, United Kingdom
- Edinburgh Television, a defunct television station in Edinburgh, United Kingdom

== Fiction ==
- Channel 6, a fictional television channel in The Simpsons; see Media in The Simpsons
- Channel 6, a fictional television station in the Teenage Mutant Ninja Turtles; see Teenage Mutant Ninja Turtles (1987 TV series)
- Channel 6 News, a fictional TV Station in Bob's Burgers
- Channel 6 Studios, a fictional studio in Regular Show

== See also ==
- 6 News (disambiguation), the news departments of various television stations
- TV6 (disambiguation), the name of television networks, channels and stations in various countries
- Channel 6 branded TV stations in the United States
- Channel 6 digital TV stations in the United States
- Channel 6 low-power TV stations in the United States
- Channel 6 radio stations in the United States
- Channel 6 TV stations in Canada
- Channel 6 virtual TV stations in Canada
- Channel 6 virtual TV stations in the United States
- FM extended band in Brazil, current allocation of VHF channels 5 and 6 in Brazil
