= Baltic Robinson =

Television series aired on Baltic states

- Also known as: Robinsonid, Robinsoni, Robinzonai (2000–02); Džunglistaar, Džungļu zvaigznes, Džiungles (2004)
- Created by: Charlie Parsons
- Theme music composer: Jon Rekdal
- Countries of origin: Estonia; Latvia; Lithuania
- Original languages: Estonian; Latvian; Lithuanian
- No. of seasons: 4

Original release
- Network: TV3 (Estonia, Latvia, Lithuania)
- Release: 30 September 2000 – 18 December 2004

Related
- Survivor

Baltic Robinson was a popular television show that aired in the Baltic region of Europe from 2000 to 2004 and was the first pan-regional edition of Robinson, or Survivor as it is referred to in some countries.

During its five-year (four-season) run, the show was hosted by Emil Rutiku for Estonian, Vytautas Kernagis for Lithuanian and Pauls Timrots for the Latvian audience. Due to the show's success, at least one contestant, Kristīne Koļadina, was given her spin-off show, which aired and was popular with viewers in her home country of Latvia.

The name alludes to both Robinson Crusoe and The Swiss Family Robinson, two stories featuring people marooned by shipwrecks.

== Format ==
The Robinson format was developed by Planet 24, a United Kingdom TV production company owned by Charlie Parsons and Bob Geldof. Their company, Castaway Television Productions, retained the rights to the concept when they sold Planet 24 in 1999. Mark Burnett later licensed the format to create the American show Survivor in 2000.

Fifteen contestants are put into a survival situation and compete in a variety of physical challenges. Early in each season, three teams compete, but later on, the teams are merged and the competitions become individual. At the end of each show, one contestant is eliminated from the show by the others in a secret "island council" ballot.

== Seasons ==
List of Baltic Robinson seasons
Year	Hosts	Channel	Location	Days	Participants	Winner	Runner-up	2nd-Runner-Up
2000	Emil Rutiku; Mārtiņš Freimanis; Vytautas Kernagis	TV3	Kõrgelaid, Estonia	?	15	Zane Mukāne	Monika Verbutaitė	Inga Vahar
2001	Emil Rutiku; Pauls Timrots; Vytautas Kernagis	TV3	Malaysia	40	13	Māris Šveiduks	Siiri Kuusmann	Linas Samaška
2002	Emil Rutiku; Pauls Timrots; Vytautas Kernagis	TV3	Malaysia	37	15	Rimas Valeikis	Ranno Rätsep	Kristīne Koļadina
2004	Tõnu Kark; Raimonds Dombrovskis; Vytautas Kernagis	TV3	Malaysia	15	18 VIP	Dagmāra Legante	Renata Ražnauskienė	Koit Toome
