= Television in Latvia =

Television in Latvia was first tested in 1937 and introduced in 1954. Latvia was the first country in the Baltic States which started broadcasting.

Initial research into television broadcasting in Latvia started in 1932, and the first experimental broadcast of television in Latvia took place on 10 November 1937 during a public viewing at the Latvian Radio Society (Latvian: Latvijas Radio biedrība) in Riga, using an amateur-made oscilloscope with the screen size of 45x50 cm. A Philips custom-built Nipkow disk transmitter used a frequency channel provide by the Department of the Post and Telegraph (Pasta un telegrāfa departaments, PTD) to transmit moving images with the speed of 12,5 frames per second. There were plans to launch regular broadcasts of "visual radio" by the Latvian Radiophone in the early 1940s, but these were suspended by the occupation of Latvia and World War II.

The first contemporary test broadcasts started on 6 November 1954 from a studio in Soviet Riga in black-and-white, which were seen by all 20 then-owners of television sets. Regular scheduled broadcasting of Latvian Television (LTV) started on 20 November 1954 with a premiere of the 1954 Soviet Latvian war epic Victorious Return. At the beginning, LTV didn't have rights to create their own programming except live shows. In 1955, the Riga Television studio in Nometņu iela, Āgenskalns was created to produce its own programming and the first TV tower in Latvia was built. In 1986, a new TV building and broadcasting tower were unveiled in Zaķusala.

Since 1991, the first private television studios started broadcasting. Color television was introduced in 1974. At the beginning, color system used was SECAM and only color programming that was available in color, was a retransmission of the Moscow Central Television. But in 1998 SECAM was swapped for PAL. Digital television was started testing in May 2002 and all terrestrial analogue stations stopped broadcasting on 1 June 2010 after introducing it. Advertising on public broadcasters, such as Latvian Television (LTV) was phased out on 1 January 2021. TV4 and TV24 ceased free-to-air broadcasting on 1 January 2025. Currently only LTV1, LTV7, ReTV, Radio SWH TV, EWTN TV and the Ukrainian Rada channel are the only such channels.

On 16 July 2026, Tet announced the end of DTT Pay-TV services from 1 January 2027.

The independent, state budget-financed National Electronic Mass Media Council (NEPLP) is the national media watchdog (similar to Ofcom in UK).

Most of the non-Latvian television programs are dubbed, some are subtitled, but some are both dubbed and subtitled. This is a list of television channels that broadcast for a Latvian language audience.

== TV channels ==
No.	Channel name	Free-to-air	Available in HD	Owner	Description
1.	LTV1	Yes	Yes	Latvijas Sabiedriskais medijs	documentaries, news, politics, satire, series, films, children's programming
2.	LTV7	Yes	Yes	Latvijas Sabiedriskais medijs	sport, entertainment, series, films
3.	TV3	No	Yes	All Media Latvia	films, series, sports, news
4.	TV4	No	Yes	4.vara	sports, educational programmes, discussion events, conference live streams
5.	TV3 Life	No	Yes	All Media Latvia	women's programmes, lifestyle programmes, series, films
6.	360 TV	No	Yes	Helio Media	series, films, documentaries
7.	TV6	No	Yes	All Media Latvia	men's programmes, series, films, sports
8.	STV	No	Yes	Helio Media	women's programmes, lifestyle programmes, series
9.	TV3 Mini	No	Yes	All Media Latvia	children's programming, series, films
10.	TV24	No	Yes	TV Latvija	news, politics, series, culture, lifestyle programmes
11.	ReTV	Yes	Yes *Only website	Re MEDIA	regional programmes, news, documentaries
12.	Radio SWH TV	Yes	Yes	AS RADIO SWH	business, entertainment, culture, music, popular science, sports, news, lifestyle, leisure, economy, art
13.	Best4Sport TV	No	Yes	B4 Media UP	sports
14.	Go3 Sport 1	No	Yes	All Media Estonia	sports
15.	FX Latvia	No	Yes	Fox Networks Group Espana	entertainment, series, films
16.	FX Life Latvia	No	Yes	Fox Networks Group Espana	entertainment, series, films
17.	National Geographic Latvia	No	Yes	NGC Europe Limited	nature, science, documentaries
18.	Discovery Channel Europe	No		Discovery Corporate Services Limited	science, documentaries
19.	Latvijas Šlāgerkanāls	No		Mūzikas Video Kanāls	music, mostly Schlager
20.	Mūzikas Video	No	Yes *Only website	Mūzikas Video Kanāls	music
21.	KidZone Max	No		Duo Media Networks OÜ (DMN Latvija)	children's programming (from 06:00 to 23:45 hrs. only), music (from 23:45 to 06:00 hrs.)
22.	Pingvīns	No		Teledistribution	children's programming in Latvian, Russian.
23.	Duo 3	No	Yes	Duo Media Networks OÜ (DMN Latvija)	series, films
24.	Duo 6	No	Yes	Duo Media Networks OÜ (DMN Latvija)	films, comedy series
25.	Kanal 7	No	Yes	Duo Media Networks OÜ (DMN Latvija)	Russian, films, series, news
26.	8TV	No	Yes	Helio Media	Russian, entertainment, films, series
27.	Duo 5	No	Yes	Duo Media Networks OÜ (DMN Latvija)	crime, series
28.	Animal Planet Europe	No		Discovery Corporate Services Limited	nature, documentaries
29.	TLC Europe	No		Discovery Corporate Services Limited	lifestyle
30.	Food Network Europe	No		Discovery Corporate Services Limited	cooking food
31.	HGTV Europe	No		Discovery Corporate Services Limited	lifestyle
32.	Investigation Discovery Europe	No		Discovery Corporate Services Limited	investigations, crime
33.	TLC Europe	No		Discovery Corporate Services Limited	lifestyle
34.	Nat Geo Wild Latvia	No	Yes	NGC Europe Limited	nature, animal documentaries

== Local / regional / international TV stations ==
- TV Kurzeme – only in Liepāja
- Lemon TV – Cable TV (Latvia), DVB-T – only in Vidzeme area
- LRT – Latgale Regional Television (only in Latgale)
- Kurzemes TV – only in Kurzeme
- OTV (Ogres TV) – only in Ogre
- LRT+ – cable TV, only in Daugavpils and Riga in Cable
- Valmieras TV – only in Valmiera
- TV Viļāni – only in Viļāni
- VTV (Vidzemes TV) – only in Vidzeme
- TV Jūrmala – only in Jūrmala, Tukums and Rīga

== Defunct channels ==
- MTV Latvia - Interrupted broadcast at November 2009 due to budget issues. Later replaced with MTV Lithuania & Latvia, which closed at the end of 2009 due to the same budget issues.
- RBS TV - Interrupted broadcast in October 1995.
- LZK (Latvia) (Latvijas Ziņu kanāls – Latvian News Channel) - Announced defunct on 9 December 2011 and closed on 30 December.
- NTV-5 - Interrupted broadcast in August 1996.
- Picca TV - Interrupted broadcast in August 1996, which was succeeded by LNT.
- TV5 - Interrupted broadcast on 31 March 2016 due to budget issues.
- LNT - Interrupted broadcast in 28 February due to rebranded television model in TV3 Group. Channel got replaced by TV3 Life on 1 March 2020.
- 31. kanāls - Interrupted broadcast in September 1998, which was succedeed by TV3.
- Kanāls 2 - Interrupted broadcast in 28 February due to rebranded television model in TV3 Group. Channel got replaced by TV3 Mini on 1 March 2020.
- Sportacentrs.com TV - Interrupted broadcast at January 1, 2022, with all sports programs of the channel moving to TV4.
- PBK Igaunija – Estonian branch of the Russian Channel One, closed on 2 March 2022, after checking.
- PBK Lietuva - Lithuanian branch of the Russian Channel One, closed on 2 March 2022, after checking.
- TV Rain - Revoked license on 6 December 2022 and closed on 8 December 2022 due to violations.
