= TV3 Gold =

- Country: Estonia
- Broadcast area: Estonia

Programming
- Picture format: 1080i HDTV

Ownership
- Owner: TV3 Group
- Sister channels: TV3; TV6; TV3 Gold; TV3 Life; Go3 Films; Go3 Sport

History
- Launched: 10 March 2025
- Replaced: TV3 Plus (Estonian feed)

TV3 Gold is an Estonian television channel owned by Providence Equity Partners. The channel replaced the second Estonian version of TV3 Plus, a Russophone network, and specializes in reruns of older TV series. The channel is available as an add-on service.

== History ==
The physical channel capacity used by TV3 Gold launched on 1 April 2022, after the closure of the former TV3 Plus being replaced by TV3 Life. This happened in the early weeks of the Russian invasion of Ukraine. The channel was set up as a free-to-air channel on Levira's digital terrestrial platform, to cater to the Russophone community as a whole.

In February 2025, TV3 Plus announced the replacement of the channel by TV3 Gold, which would broadcast in Estonian, airing American and European productions (from the 90s onwards) and also reruns of TV3 Estonia's series. The rationale for its closure was due to a decline in demand from the Russian-speaking population and advertisers.

== See also ==
- List of Estonian television channels
