= Baltic Robinson 2004 =

Season of television series

- Season 4
- Presented by: Tõnu Kark; Raimonds Dombrovskis; Vytautas Kernagis
- No. of days: 15
- No. of castaways: 18
- Winner: Dagmāra Legante
- Runners-up: Renata Ražnauskiene; Koit Toome
- Location: Malaysia

Release
- Original network: TV3 (Estonia, Latvia, Lithuania)
- Original release: September 11 – December 18, 2004

Season chronology
- ← Previous; 2002

Baltic Robinson: 2004 (also known as Jungle Star) was the fourth season of Expedition Robinson (known as Survivor in certain countries) aired in the Baltic region and the third to be filmed in Malaysia. The season aired from 11 September 2004 until December 18, 2004 and is based upon a format originally devised by the now-defunct British production company, Planet 24.

== Season summary ==
The central premise of the 2004 edition was the sole participation of celebrity contestants. Other changes that were made involved a filming period of 15 days (unlike the 30-day duration of preceding seasons) and the division of the contestants into two "tribes" through the use of a method known as a "schoolyard pick" (when team leaders interchangeably choose from a pool of people in order to form competing teams.)

Latvian finalist Dagmāra Legante (13 votes) eventually won the prize of €10 000, prevailing over the Lithuanian representative, Renata Ražnauskiene (7 votes), and the Estonian representative, Koit Toome (6 votes). Legante dominated in the competition stage of the season, earning five of her votes from the challenges. In comparison, Toome and Ražnauskiene earned two votes and one vote respectively during this phase of the competition.

== Finishing order ==
Country	Contestant	Original Tribe	Tribal Swap	Merge Tribe	Finish
Eesti	Kati Murutar; 37, Tallinn	Elephants			1st Voted Out; 1st Jury Member; Day 4
Latvija	Ģirts "Ozols" Rozentāls; 25, Riga	Elephants			Eliminated by Kati; 2nd Jury Member, 3rd Jury Member; Day 4
Lietuva	Vitalijus "Cololo" Cololo; 30, Vilnius	Elephants			Eliminated by Kati; 2nd Jury Member, 3rd Jury Member; Day 4
Eesti	Eve Kivi; 66, Tallinn	Tigers			2nd Voted Out; 4th Jury Member; Day 5
Lietuva	Edilija "Geltona" Šliauderienė; 21, Klaipėda	Elephants			3rd Voted Out; 5th Jury Member; Day 6
Latvija	Regnārs Vaivars; 30, Riga	Tigers	Elephants		4th Voted Out; 6th Jury Member; Day 7
Lietuva	Alanas Chošnau; 30, Vilnius	Elephants	Elephants		5th Voted Out; 7th Jury Member; Day 8
Latvija	Aivars "Vilipsōns" Vilipsōns; 40, Riga	Tigers	Tigers		6th Voted Out; 8th Jury Member; Day 9
Eesti	Kadi Toom; 22, Tallinn	Elephants	Elephants		7th Voted Out; 9th Jury Member; Day 10
Lietuva	Liveta Kazlauskienė; 39, Vilnius	Tigers	Tigers	Merged Tribe	8th Voted Out; 10th Jury Member; Day 11
Latvija	Alla Petropavlovska; 44, Riga	Tigers	Tigers	Merged Tribe	9th Voted Out; 11th Jury Member; Day 12
Eesti	Erich Krieger; 43, Tallinn	Tigers	Tigers	Merged Tribe	10th Voted Out; 12th Jury Member; Day 13
Eesti	Jaanus Raidal; 41, Tallinn	Tigers	Tigers	Merged Tribe	Lost Jury Votes; 13th Jury Member, 14th Jury Member, 15th Jury Member; Day 14
Latvija	Kristīne Nevarauska; 23, Riga	Elephants	Tigers	Merged Tribe	Lost Jury Votes; 13th Jury Member, 14th Jury Member, 15th Jury Member; Day 14
Lietuva	Stanislovas Buškevičius; 46, Vilnius	Tigers	Tigers	Merged Tribe	Lost Jury Votes; 13th Jury Member, 14th Jury Member, 15th Jury Member; Day 14
Eesti	Koit Toome; 25, Tallinn	Elephants	Elephants	Merged Tribe	2nd-Runner-Up; Day 15
Lietuva	Renata Ražnauskiene; 25, Vilnius	Tigers	Elephants	Merged Tribe	Runner-Up; Day 15
Latvija	Dagmāra Legante; 26, Riga	Elephants	Elephants	Merged Tribe	Sole Survivor; Day 15
