= TV3 Mini =

- Country: Latvia
- Broadcast area: Latvia, online
- Headquarters: Riga

Programming
- Picture format: 1080i (HDTV)

Ownership
- Owner: All Media Latvia
- Sister channels: TV3; TV6; TV3 Plus; TV3 Life; Go3 Films; Go3 Sport

History
- Launched: 1 March 2020
- Replaced: Kanāls 2

Links
- Website: Official website

TV3 Mini is a Latvian television channel, created in 2020 to replace Kanāls 2. The channel caters viewers ages 4 to 11, entirely in Latvian.

== History ==
Kanāls 2 was attached to Latvijas Neatkarīgā Televīzija. In November 2019, TV3 announced the shutdown of LNT and the renaming of its channels under the TV3 umbrella. The license was revoked on 24 January 2020. Its license was used to carry the new TV3 Mini channel, which started broadcasting on 1 March 2020. The creation of a children's channel was, alongside the women's channel (TV3 Life, which replaced LNT), to cater to an important group of viewers. Launch programming included the popular British preschool series Peppa Pig, Russian series Masha and the Bear and a package of Disney titles. For 2020, the channel would implement original content, as well as educational content from abroad.

During its first month on air, it attracted 83,983 viewers in the 4-11 target demographic. Peppa Pig alone attracted 26,893 viewers, airing 440 times for an average of 44 hours that month, while The Little Prince was seen by one out of four viewers of the channel. Three movies from the Home Alone franchise (1, 2 and 4) also attracted a large young audience.

The channel started airing Ukulele, a series created by Ausma, creator of the popular Latvian children's franchise Tutas lietas, on 2 April 2021. On 3 March 2025, the channel started airing Cocomelon in Latvian.
