= Baltic Robinson 2000 =

2000 Baltic television season

- Season 1
- Presented by: Emil Rutiku; Mārtiņš Freimanis; Vytautas Kernagis
- No. of castaways: 15
- Winner: Zane Mukāne
- Runners-up: Monika Verbutaitė; Inga Vahar
- Location: Kõrgelaid, Estonia
- No. of episodes: 13

Release
- Original network: TV3 Estonia; TV3 Latvia; TV3 Lithuania
- Original release: September 30 – December 24, 2000

Season chronology
- Next → 2001

Baltic Robinson 2000, was the first version of Expedition Robinson, or Survivor to air in the Baltic region of Europe. 15 contestants faced off against each in three teams of five representing their nation trying to survive and win immunity and avoid tribal council. Due to the nature of the season, each tribe (country) had to have at least one representative be a part of the final three and reach the final tribal council. The season notably wasn't filmed in a tropical location but filmed on the unhabitated island of Kõrgelaid in Estonia.

The season aired on the local countries network TV3 with its premiere on 30 September 2000 in Estonia and Lithuania with Latvia airing the following day. The season concluded on 24 December 2000 where Latvian Zane Mukāne won in a final challenge against Lithuanian Monika Verbutaitė and Estonian Inga Vahar to win a Mazda 626 alongside the title of Robinson.

== Finishing order ==
| Contestant | Original Tribe | Merged Tribe | Finish |
|---|---|---|---|
| Riina Tärn; 51, Tallinn | Eesti | | 1st Voted Out; Day 4 |
| Vilnis Auzāns †; 39, Bauska | Latvija | | 2nd Voted Out; Day 8 |
| Aleksėjus Karpovas; 45, Vilnius | Lietuva | | 3rd Voted Out; Day ? |
| Normunds Zandbergs; 31, Sigulda | Latvija | | 4th Voted Out; Day ? |
| Rainer ? 29, Estonia | Eesti | | 5th Voted Out; Day ? |
| Daiga Štrausa; 29, London, England | Latvija | | 6th Voted Out; Day ? |
| Šarūnas Nacevičius; 28, Vilnius | Lietuva | Robinson | 7th Voted Out; Day ? |
| Sven Kase; 30, Võru | Eesti | Robinson | 8th Voted Out; Day ? |
| Danutė Martinkėnienė; 42, Vilnius | Lietuva | Robinson | 9th Voted Out; Day ? |
| Audrius Povilaitis; 30, Vilnius | Lietuva | Robinson | 10th Voted Out; Day ? |
| Dimitri Kosjakov; 26, Narva | Eesti | Robinson | 11th Voted Out; Day ? |
| Reinis Rubenis; 26, Riga | Latvija | Robinson | 12th Voted Out; Day ? |
| Inga Vahar; 26, Haapsalu | Eesti | Robinson | 2nd Runner-up; Day ? |
| Monika Verbutaitė; 19, Pakruojis | Lietuva | Robinson | Runner-up; Day ? |
| Zane Mukāne; 20, Ķekava | Latvija | Robinson | Robinson; Day ? |
