= Baltic Robinson 2002 =

Season of television series

- Season 3
- Presented by: Emil Rutiku; Pauls Timrots; Vytautas Kernagis
- No. of days: 37
- No. of castaways: 15
- Winner: Rimas Valeikis
- Runners-up: Ranno Rätsep; Kristine Koļadina
- Location: Malaysia
- No. of episodes: 11

Release
- Original network: TV3 (Estonia, Latvia, Lithuania)
- Original release: October 5 – December 15, 2002

Season chronology
- ← Previous; 2001 Next → 2004

Baltic Robinson: 2002, was the third version of Expedition Robinson, or Survivor to air in the Baltic region of Europe. This season premiered on October 5, 2002 and aired until December 15, 2002.

== Season summary ==
Like in the first two seasons, the three tribes were divided based on the contestants country of origin. Along with this, each tribe was given the name of the country of its contestants origin in that country's native language. As the first twist of the season, in episode one all three tribes were forced to vote out one member. What the contestants didn't know was that these three eliminated players would later return to the game after the merge in episode five. As there were twelve players in the merge tribe and three finalists, there was a nine-member jury. As each country had to be represented in the final three, contestant Ranno Rätsep became a finalist in episode eight when Maris Valdre, the only other remaining member of the Estonian tribe left in the game, was voted out. Because of this, Ranno was immune from the final elimination challenge in episode ten when all remaining Latvian and Lithuanian contestants had to compete against contestants from their home country for a spot in the final three. Ultimately, it was Rimas Valeikis of Lithuania who won the season with 4 votes against him, the runner up was Estonian Ranno Rätsep with 6 votes against him and the second runner up was Latvian Kristine Koļadina with 8 votes against her given by the jury.

== Finishing order ==
Contestant	Original Tribe	Merged Tribe	Finish
Jaanus Valk; Returned to game	Eesti		1st Voted Out; Day 2
Madara Šlēkste; Returned to game	Latvija		1st Voted Out; Day 2
Gediminas Urbonas; Returned to game	Lietuva		1st Voted Out; Day 2
Baiba Liepiņa; 26, Alsunga	Latvija		2nd Voted Out; 1st Jury Member; Day ?
Rima Naujokienė; 35, Tauragė	Lietuva		3rd Voted Out; 2nd Jury Member; Day ?
Kaie Kiis; 20, Venevere	Eesti		4th Voted Out; 3rd Jury Member; Day ?
Reno Laidre; 24, Karula	Eesti	Robinson	5th Voted Out; 4th Jury Member; Day ?
Jaanus Valk; 35, Vändra	Eesti	Robinson	6th Voted Out; 5th Jury Member; Day ?
Madara Šlēkste; 21, Bauska	Latvija	Robinson	7th Voted Out; 6th Jury Member; Day ?
Gediminas Urbonas; 40, Vilnius	Lietuva	Robinson	Evacuated; 7th Jury Member; Day ?
Maris Valdre; 21, Tallinn	Eesti	Robinson	8th Voted Out; 8th Jury Member; Day ?
Andris Upenieks; 27, Ogre	Latvija	Robinson	9th Voted Out; 9th Jury Member; Day ?
Irmantas Mickevičius; 27, Vilnius	Lietuva	Robinson	Lost Challenge; 10th Jury Member; Day ?
Jānis Dūdums; 23, Riga	Latvija	Robinson	Lost Challenge; 11th Jury Member; Day ?
Ugnė Kazickienė; 24, Vilnius	Lietuva	Robinson	Lost Challenge; 12th Jury Member; Day ?
Kristine Koļadina; 21, Liepāja	Latvija	Robinson	2nd-Runner-Up; Day 37
Ranno Rätsep; 20, Tartu	Eesti	Robinson	Runner-Up; Day 37
Rimas Valeikis; 25, Vilnius	Lietuva	Robinson	Sole Survivor; Day 37

== Voting history ==
	Original Tribes						Merged Tribe										
Episode #:	1			2	3	4	5	6	7	8		9	10		Reunion		
Eliminated:	Gediminas; 3/5 votes	Jaanus; 3/5 votes	Madara ?/5 votes	Baiba; 2/4 votes	Rima; 3/4 votes	Kaie; 2/4 votes	Reno; 3/8 votes	Jaanus; 5/12 votes	Madara; 5/10 votes	Gediminas; No vote	Maris; 3/8 votes	Andris; 5/7 votes	Irmantas; Ugnė; No vote	Jānis; No vote	Kristine; 8/18 votes^{1}	Ranno; 6/18 votes^{1}	Rimas; 4/18 votes
Voter	Vote																
Rimas	Gediminas				Rima		Reno	Jaanus	Jānis		Maris	Andris	1st			Ranno	
Ranno		?				Kaie		Jaanus	Madara		Jānis	Immune			Kristine		
Kristine			?	Baiba			Jānis	?	Gediminas		Maris	Andris; Irmantas		1st		Ranno	
Ugnė	Gediminas				Rima		Reno	Jaanus	Madara		Ranno	Andris	2nd		Kristine		
Jānis			?	Andris			Andris	Jaanus	Madara		Ranno	Andris		2nd			Rimas
Irmantas	Gediminas				Rima		Reno	Jaanus	Madara		Maris	Andris	3rd			Ranno	
Andris			?	Baiba			Jānis	Madara	Gediminas		Jānis	Irmantas				Ranno	
Maris		?				Kaie	Andris	Andris	Madara		Kristine	~~Rimas~~			Kristine		
Gediminas	Irmantas			On Goal Island				Andris	Andris		~~Andris~~				Kristine		
Madara			Andris	On Goal Island				Andris	Andris		~~Andris~~						Rimas
Jaanus		Kaie		On Goal Island				Andris	~~Rimas~~								Rimas
Reno		Jaanus				Maris	Maris	Irmantas									Rimas
Kaie		Jaanus				Ranno									Kristine		
Rima	Irmantas				Irmantas										Kristine		
Baiba			?	Jānis												Ranno	

^1As Kristina and Ranno both lost plank, they each had additional votes against them at the final tribal council.
