= Baltic Robinson 2001 =

Season of television series

- Season 2
- Presented by: Emil Rutiku; Pauls Timrots; Vytautas Kernagis
- No. of days: 40
- No. of castaways: 13
- Winner: Māris Šveiduks
- Runners-up: Siiri Kuusmann; Linas Samaška
- Location: Malaysia
- No. of episodes: 10

Release
- Original network: TV3 (Estonia, Latvia, Lithuania)
- Original release: October 6 – December 15, 2001

Season chronology
- ← Previous; 2000 Next → 2002

Baltic Robinson: 2001, was the second version of Expedition Robinson, or Survivor to air in the Baltic region of Europe. This season premiered on 6 October 2001 and aired until December 15, 2001.

== Season summary ==
Like in the first season, the three tribes were divided based on the contestants country of origin. Along with this, each tribe was given the name of the country of its contestants origin in that country's native language. For an unknown reason there were only twelve contestants when this season started as opposed to the usual fifteen. When it came time for the merge a joker, Siiri Kuusmann from Estonia, entered the competition. As another twist, at the fifth tribal council two players were eliminated instead of the usual one. Due to the medical emergency that saw Vidmantas Lietuvninkas evacuation from the game, Linas Samaška from Lithuania became the first finalist of the season in episode eight. By the end of the same episode, Māris Sveiduks also became a finalist when the only other contestant from Latvia that remained, Anna Steina, was voted out at tribal council. As Māris won the final immunity challenge in episode nine, he and he alone would vote to determine who of Siiri Kuusmann and Viive Rižski would be the finalist from Estonia and the final contestant through to the final. When it came time for the final a combination of votes cast by jurors, votes cast by the public, and penalty votes from plank decided the winner. Ultimately, Māris Sveiduks of Latvia who won the season with just 2 votes against him, the runner up was Estonian Siiri Kuusmann with 13 votes against her and the second runner up was Lithuanian Linas Samaška with 19 votes against him.

== Finishing order ==
Contestant	Original Tribe	Merged Tribe	Finish
Urmas Heinmaa; 38, Pärnu	Eesti		1st Voted Out; 1st Jury Member; Day 3
Ieva Vizbaraite; 19, Vilnius	Lietuva		2nd Voted Out; 2nd Jury Member; Day 4
Lāsma Štāle; 19, Riga	Latvija		3rd Voted Out; 3rd Jury Member; Day 6
Vaida Blistrubiene; 30, Mažeikiai	Lietuva		4th Voted Out; 4th Jury Member; Day ?
Helena-Reet Ennet; 22, Tartu	Eesti	Robinson	5th Voted Out; 5th Jury Member; Day ?
Allan Prooso; 29, Tallinn	Eesti	Robinson	6th Voted Out; 6th Jury Member; Day ?
Oskārs Brambergs; 26, Riga	Latvija	Robinson	7th Voted Out; 7th Jury Member; Day ?
Vidmantas Lietuvninkas; 44, Tauragė	Lietuva	Robinson	Evacuated; 8th Jury Member; Day ?
Anna Šteina; 28, Riga	Latvija	Robinson	8th Voted Out; 9th Jury Member; Day ?
Viive Rižski; 45, Viimsi	Eesti	Robinson	9th Voted Out; 10th Jury Member; Day ?
Linas Samaška; 23, Kaunas	Lietuva	Robinson	2nd-Runner-Up; Day 40
Siiri Kuusmann; 25, Tallinn		Robinson	Runner-Up; Day 40
Māris Šveiduks; 41, Liepāja	Latvija	Robinson	Sole Survivor; Day 40

On April 15, 2011 Estonian representative Urmas Heinmaa died in his sleep. At the time of his death Heinmaa was 48.

== Voting history ==
	Original Tribes				Merged Tribe								
Episode #:	2	3	4	5	6		7	8		9	Reunion		
Eliminated:	Urmas; 3/4 votes	Ieva; 3/4 votes	Låsma; 3/4 votes	Vaida; 2/3 votes	Helena-Reet; 5/8 votes^{1}	Allan; 3/8 votes^{1}	Oskārs; 4/7 votes	Vidmantas; No vote	Anna; 3/5 votes	Viive; 1/1 vote	Linas; 19/34 votes^{2}	Siiri; 13/34 votes^{2}	Māris; 2/34 votes^{2}
Voter	Vote												
Māris			Låsma		Allan		Oskārs		Anna	Viive	Jury vote		
Siiri	Not in game						Oskārs		Anna		Jury vote		
Linas		Ieva		Vaida	Helena-Reet		Vidmantas		Anna	Immune	Jury vote		
Viive	Urmas				Helena-Reet		Oskārs		Siiri		Linas		
Anna			Låsma		Allan		Oskārs		Māris		Linas		
Vidmantas		Ieva		Vaida	Helena-Reet		Viive					Siiri	
Oskārs			Låsma		Helena-Reet		Māris				Linas		
Allan	Urmas				Helena-Reet						Linas		
Helena-Reet	Urmas				Allan						Linas		
Vaida		Ieva		Linas								Siiri	
Låsma			Māris								Linas		
Ieva		Linas										Siiri	
Urmas	Viive										Linas		

	Merged Tribe		
Episode #:	Reunion		
Country	Vote		
Estonia	Linas(x4)		Māris(x2)
Latvia	Linas(x2)	Siiri(x4)	
Lithuania	Linas(x4)	Siiri(x2)	

^1As Siiri was new in episode six, she was not permitted to vote or be voted for at the fifth tribal council.

^2As Linas and Siiri both lost plank, they each had additional votes against them at the final tribal council. The public of each country was also voting to give additional votes to two of the three finalists. The finalist who placed first in the polls in each country would receive four votes against them, the person who placed second would receive two votes against them, and the person who placed third would receive no additional votes.
