= 31. kanāls =

Latvian television channel

- Country: Latvia
- Broadcast area: Riga, Pierīga
- Headquarters: Riga

Programming
- Picture format: SECAM (576i 4:3 SDTV) (till 1998); PAL (576i 4:3 SDTV) (1998)

Ownership
- Owner: Elita Mīlgrāve (TV 3); Vladimirs Sušickis (WNA); Māris Ozoliņš (WNA/SIA "31. kanāls")

History
- Launched: 2 July 1990 (experimental channel), 1 July 1992
- Closed: 19 September 1998

31. kanāls (Channel 31) was a Latvian commercial television channel, which started broadcasting in the 1990s. The coverage area was limited to Riga and the larger Pierīga region. Several companies owned the channel throughout its history.

== History ==
On 4 May 1992, the commercial television company NTV-5 started operating on UHF channel 31. Around the same time, the Christian program Gaisma and IGE TV started airing. On 31 December, NTV-5 left the frequency. The following day, the TV channel Laine started broadcasting on the frequency, and in late January, Russian channel RTR. During the course of that year, the Swedish media company Kinnevik Media International AB and Jānis Čakste's successor, Kārlis Čakste, began operating on the channel, as TV3. On 1 July 1994, RTR left the frequency and had its airtime occupied by Taska Limited, and later controlled by Norwegian interests, partitioned between "Kanāls 2" (Tuesdays, Wednesdays and Thursdays), Kinnevik/TV3 (Fridays and Saturdays) and Baltkom (Sundays and Mondays). At night, TV3 aired TV Pūce's programs.

From 1993, Kinnevik and TV3 distributed international television series to air on Latvijas Televīzija's two channels, LTV1 and LTV2, mainly from the United States and Australia: Neighbours, Saved by the Bell, E Street, The Bold and the Beautiful, Paradise Beach, Murder, She Wrote, among others. TV3's programming on the frequency included Sporta pasaule, Kino, kino, kino, Latvju ziņģe, and even action series such as The A-Team, Miami Vice and the Venezuelan telenovela Cara sucia. Its key staff included Elita Mīlgrāve, Arvīds Babris and Andris Ušackis.

On 5 May 1996, TV3 left 31. kanāls and the Latvian market due to financial difficulties, as well as an act of protest for the loss of its broadcasting rights on the UHF frequency, in the network formerly used by ORT's relays, as well as the merger of NTV-5 and Picca TV to form a new channel, Latvijas Neatkarīgā Televīzija (LNT), which started broadcasting in August that year. In mid-1996, Kanāls 2 ceased operating on the frequency. On 30 August 1996, the rights for the frequency were acquired by SIA Informācijas Analītiskais Dienests "Pasaules ziņu aģentūra" (WNA or VNA TV). Broadcasts on the frequency started on 9 December 1996. On 17 March 1997, SIA "Pasaules ziņu aģentūra" was sold to Crosstrade Incorporated Latvia Limited, and on 21 March, WNA TV's director became Māris Ozoliņš, who had previously worked for other commercial television channels. On 11 June 1997, 51% of the shares were acquired by AS PAREKSS-BANKA (33,5%), Māris Ozoliņš (12,5%) and SIA Culture Studio Ltd (5%). The sixth Parliamentary Inquiry Commission of the Latvian Saeima criticized VNA's programming on 31. kanāls for its violent programming, as well as giving an unusually high amount of airtime for programs in the Russian language.

On 20 January 1998, SIA Pasaules ziņu aģentūra was renamed SIA 31. kanāls. From 1 February, 31. kanāls alongside LNT, LTV and "TV Rīga" (later TV5) switched its color standard from SECAM to PAL. On 12 June 1998, 49% of SIA 31. kanāls was sold to Swedish company Modern Times Group subsidiary MTG Broadcasting AB; 49% to AS PAREKSS-BANKA, and 2% to Kārlis Čakste. On 27 August, Māris Ozoliņš left the post of director of 31. kanāls. On 17 September, SIA 31. kanāls was renamed SIA TV 3 Latvia, while at 1:25pm on 19 September, 31. kanāls shut down and was replaced by TV3.

== Identity ==
When Kinnevik began as a distributor of content and providing programming for the channel, it used the universal brand employed by the TV3 channels in Sweden, Norway and Denmark. As an on-screen bug, a crude, text-based recreation was used instead.

Kanāls 2's logo was a numeral 2, similar to the one found in the logo for the Estonian Kanal 2, seen from a tilted perspective and with different colors for each row of 2s, stacked vertically.

31. kanāls used an abstract 31 shape for its news operation.

When WNA took over, its screen bug was an uppercase WNA wordmark which was later replaced by an abstract blue shape resembling a diamond.
