= Ģirts =

- Gender: Male
- Name day: 5 May

Origin
- Region of origin: Latvia

Ģirts is a Latvian masculine given name and may refer to:

- Ģirts Ankipāns (born 1975), Latvian ice hockey player
- Ģirts Dzelde (born 1963), Latvian professional tennis player
- Ģirts Feldbergs (born 1993), Latvian swimmer
- Ģirts Karlsons (born 1981), Latvian football striker
- Ģirts Ķesteris (born 1964), Latvian actor
- Ģirts Valdis Kristovskis (born 1962), Latvian politician
- Ģirts Līcis (born 1970), Latvian entrepreneur and television presenter
