= TV6 =

TV6 or TV-6 may refer to:

- TV6 (1994), Nordic television channel, renamed Viasat Nature/Crime in 1998
- TV6 (Algerian TV channel)
- TV6 (Estonian TV channel), Estonian television channel launched in 2008
- TV6 (French TV channel), defunct French television channel broadcasting in 1986 and 1987, predecessor to M6
- TV6 (Latvian TV channel), Latvian television channel launched in 2007
- TV6 (Lithuanian TV channel), Lithuanian television channel launched in 2008
- TV6 (Swedish TV channel)
- TV6 (Poland), Polish television channel launched in 2011
- TV-6 (Russia), defunct first Russian commercial television channel launched in 1993 and closed in 2002
- TV6 (Swedish TV channel), Swedish television channel launched in 2006
- CCN TV6, television channel on Trinidad and Tobago
- Channel 6 (Ireland), Irish television channel, closed in 2009
- WLUC-TV, Marquette, Michigan, United States
- TV6, A defunct Malaysian Channel owned by RTM.

== See also ==
- Channel 6 (disambiguation)
