= Kanāls 2 =

- Country: Latvia
- Broadcast area: Latvia
- Headquarters: Riga

Ownership
- Owner: All Media Baltics

History
- Launched: 29 May 2006
- Closed: 1 March 2020
- Former names: Latvijas Mūzikas Kanāls (2006-2012)

Kanāls 2 (Channel 2) was a Latvian television channel, which opened on 29 May 2006. The channel was owned by TV3 Group. It aired foreign and Latvian series, feature films, Latvian and foreign music videos and informational and entertainment programming. Until 29 January 2012, its name was Latvijas Mūzikas Kanāls (LMK, Latvian Music Channel). The channel was available in almost all cable TV companies in Latvia, as well as the subscription digital terrestrial television service from Lattelecom.

On 7 November 2019, TV3 Group announced its shutdown and replacement by TV3 Mini, a children's channel, coinciding with the shutdown of LNT.

== History ==
Latvijas Mūzikas Kanāls (or LMK) started broadcasting on 29 May 2006, airing entertainment programs, hit charts, shows and concerts. The channel offered the latest music videos from new Latvian music talents, 24 hours a day. It had ten original programs at launch as well as theme blocks featuring music videos. It also offered a morning program featuring news regarding culture, music and fashion. LMK was relayed overnight on LNT. As of July 2019, its successor channel Kanāls 2 aired music videos from 5am to 8am and then again from 12am to 2am.

LMK started the "LMK Aktuālo klipu TOP 20" charts in February 2008, where viewers voted on the top videos for free on its website and send paid text messages. Only the most recent videos on LMK entered the chart, and if the video received the fewest votes, it was removed from the chart. The format was limited to twenty music videos per time.

Talks in 2010 were made to integrate LMK into the LNT ecosystem, by competing with TV6 and positioning in the same demographic.

In 2011, LMK and telecommunications operator OKarte initiated the branded content format OKartes skatuve". The format's essence was to allow the members to express themselves freely and creatively - to create original songs, a stage persona, take care of marketing and finances. All the management related to the creation of music and the creation of the group was completely transferred to the hands of the members themselves. During the week, the contestants had to prepare a performance for the big concert on Friday, two songs that the contestants performed back-to-back at the concert. One song was an original song created by the participants in the show, the other a well-known song that the participants performed in their own interpretation. Since the tone of the music industry is primarily set by the fans, the show's only decision-makers on seating arrangements at the concert were the television viewers. The group "Jātnieki" became the winners of the musical show "OKartes skutave".

On 9 January 2012, TV5, LNT and LMK were acquired by the Swedish media company Modern Times Group. In line with this acquisition, the channel was renamed Kanāls 2 on 29 January 2012. In conjunction with the change in name and format, the channel would increase its entertainment output, as well as technological and programming improvements, coupled with the addition of the channel to Viasat Latvia, reaching 100,000 new subscribers.

In October 2013, Kanāls 2, alongside LNT and TV5, converted to 16:9 widescreen.

On 26 July 2018, the channel was acquired by All Media Baltics and, at the same time, began broadcasting in high definition.

The channel's closure was announced on 7 November 2019, being replaced by TV3 Mini from 1 March 2020.
