= Viņas melo labāk =

- Genre: Soap opera
- Directed by: Sigita Račka (Season 1-8), Māris Bezmers (Season 9-10)
- Starring: Karīna Tatarinova; Andris Bulis; Evija Skulte; Lauris Dzelzītis; Elīna Vāne; Alise Polačenko; Inita Sondore; Kārlis Neimanis; Jānis Vimba; Kristīne Nevarauska
- Theme music composer: Žilvins Lili - "Meitenes vēl pasakām tic"
- Country of origin: Latvia, with the original version of the show "Moterys meluoja geriau" being originated in Lithuania
- Original language: Latvian
- No. of seasons: 10
- No. of episodes: 702

Production
- Producer: Rimvīds Martinaitis
- Running time: 24 min

Original release
- Network: TV3 Latvia, TV3 Life
- Release: 2013 – 2022

Viņas melo labāk ('They [females] Lie Better') is a Latvian summer daytime soap opera broadcast by TV3 Latvia. It ran on TV for 10 seasons and has featured well-known Latvian actors including Andris Bullis, Lauris Reiniks, Evija Skulte, and Karīna Tatarinova.

The show is a Latvian adaptation and remake of the iconic original Lithuanian TV series Moterys Meluoja Geriau (Women Lie Better), starring the lead actors Edita Užaitė (Kristina), Inga Norkutė (Meda), Jūratė Budriūnaitė (Margo / Margarita / Matrona), Jurgita Jurkutė (Jolanta), Vytautas Šapranauskas (Paulius), Agnė Šataitė (Ugnė), Ramūnas Rudokas (Marijus), Marius Jampolskis (Donatas), Gintarė Latvėnaitė (Jūratė) and Nerijus Gadliauskas (Robertas).

The show was created by Sigita Račka and Rimvīds Martinaitis, and was watched by 784,000 Latvian residents on TV and video platforms in the first 4 weeks of airing.

On May 27, 2019, the show's seventh season began airing from Mondays through Thursdays.

== History ==
The first series of soap opera “Viņas melo labāk” began in July 2013 which was broadcast on TV3 Latvia. At the time, “Viņas melo labāk” was the only daytime soap opera after “UgunsGrēks” ended on TV3 Latvia. “Viņas melo labāk” new series airs each summer on weekdays.

== Storyline ==
When Viņas melo labāk began in 2013, the TV series was about the lonely Kristīne, who is single, her friend Marta, who has been married, but spends time with other men, workaholic Margo, and Jolanta, who came to Riga from a small town in search of happiness. The women encounter unexpected adventures when many other characters join the soap opera. Within the first four weeks of the series, “Viņas melo labāk” achieved success on TV screens and on video streaming platforms and applications after it became watched by 784,000 Latvian residents.

== Cast ==
In the first season of “Viņas melo labāk,” there were four main female characters – Marta, Margarita, Jolanta and Kristīne. In season 6, there were 30 characters. In 5 years, including the current characters, there have been 47 actors who have appeared on this soap opera, including the well-known Latvian singer and actor Lauris Reiniks.

Character	Actor
Margarita Sirmā	Karīna Tatarinova
Māris Krauze	Andris Bulis
Marta Kļava	Evija Skulte
Arvis Šmēdiņš	Lauris Dzelzītis
Kondrāds Savickis	Kārlis Neimanis
Kārlis Vasalnieks	Lauris Subatnieks
Baiba Damberga	Elīna Vāne
Jolanta Jurkute	Alise Polačenko
Konstantīns Ēķis	Kristians Kareļins
Olga	Sarnīte Rubule
Kristīne	Inita Sondore
Silvestrs Sirmais	Arnis Līcītis
Jānis	Juris Hiršs
Dainis	Artis Robežnieks
Roberts Šņoriņš	Māris Bezmers
Irēna Šņoriņa	Velta Līvija Straume
Ričards	Juris Strenga
Marija Šmēdiņa	Anete Krasovska
Simona	Ērika Eglija
Mārtiņš	Ģirts Luiziniks
Reinis Blūms	Gints Aidžāns
Dina Blūma	Ieva Florence
Gatis Būms	Normunds Laizāns
Artūrs	Ivars Auziņš
Fēlikss Šmakovs	Juris Bartkevičs
Ketija Šmakova	Lelde Dreimane
Artis Duklāvs	Dainis Gaidelis
Jekaterina Lovčenko	Maija Doveika
Lauris	Jurijs Djakonovs
Igors (Zobs)	Lauris Reiniks
Liāna Strēle	Agnese Zeltiņa
Sandra	Maija Arvena Ozoliņa
Viesturs	Ainārs Ančevskis
Samanta	Kristīne Belicka
Markus Larsens	Mārtiņš Upenieks
Lauma Vilmane	Inga Tropa
Raivo (Mellais)	Gints Grāvelis
Madara	Zane Dombrovska
Ligita	Dita Lūriņa
Sandis	Edijs Zalaks
Samanta Sokpāne	Liene Sebre
Agnese	Anete Bendika
Nauris	Jurģis Spulenieks
Indulis	Jānis Ārmanis
Arnis	Ivars Kļavinskis
Katrīna	Inga Krasovska
Toms	Kaspars Zāle

== Executive production and head writing team ==
Director – Sigita Račka

Producer – Rimvīds Martinaitis

Assistant – Gatis Upesleja

TV Operators – Sandris Polis and Igors Stāds

Sound engineer – Ainars Ašmanis

Costume and make-up artist – Kristīne Anderosne

== Theme song ==
Each season has started with the title song “Meitenes vēl pasakām tic” (“Girls Still believe in Fairy Tales”). The song is composed by Lithuanian composer Žilvins Lili, written by Guntars Račs, arranged by Gints Stankevičs and performed by Latvian singers Ieva Karēvica and IGO (Rodrigo Fomins).
