= LZK =

LZK may refer to:

- Latvijas Ziņu Kanāls, a defunct Latvian television news channel
- An alias for the MAP3K13 enzyme
- Łódzkie Zakłady Kinotechniczne (ŁZK), a former Polish manufacturer of film projectors
- The Doppler radar code of the National Weather Service North Little Rock, Arkansas

== See also ==
- LZKZ
