= TV3+ =

TV3+ may refer to:

- TV3+ (Danish TV channel)
- TV3+ (Norwegian TV channel)
- TV3 Plus, a TV channel in the Baltic states
