= Latvijas Ziņu Kanāls =

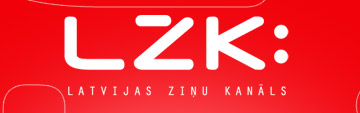
- Country: Latvia
- Broadcast area: Latvia
- Headquarters: Riga

Programming
- Picture format: PAL (576i 4:3 SDTV)

Ownership
- Owner: AS Latvijas Neatkarīgā Televīzija

History
- Launched: 2006
- Closed: 30 December 2011

Latvijas Ziņu Kanāls (LZK, Latvian News Channel) was the first news channel from Latvia. It operated for five years before shutting down in 2011. The channel employed the resources of Latvijas Neatkarīgā Televīzija and local television stations.

== History ==
LZK started broadcasting in 2006 initially only in Riga and Vidzeme. On 3 September 2007, coverage increased to include Latgale, following the signing of an agreement with local television station Latgales Reģionālā Televīzija, representing an increase in 240,000 potential new viewers. As part of this development, LZK increased its regional correspondent points outside of Riga.

Talks emerged in March 2010 regarding the creation of a holding led by LNT founder Andrejs Ēķis involving five channels, LNT, TV5, LZK, LMK and a regional channel, while LZK would absorb the regional stations, creating a uniform channel with regional programms from all of Latvia being available nationwide, counting from 1 July, the date where Latvia's analog TV signals were switched off. In August 2010, TV5 became its sole owner; on 21 December 2011, LZK's shutdown request was approved by the NEPLP, before ultimately shutting down on 30 December. The closure of the channel was likely owing to the merger of LNT with MTG Latvia. The regulator subsequently cancelled the license.
