= Ģirts Ķesteris =

Latvian actor

- Born: 14 February 1964 (age 61); Valmiera, Latvian SSR, Soviet Union
- Occupation: Actor

Ģirts Ķesteris (born 14 February 1964) is a Latvian actor. He is employed by the Valmiera Drama Theatre. In 1994 he won the Spēlmaņu nakts gada aktieris award for best actor.

== Selected filmography ==
Year	Film	Role
1988	Māja bez izejas	Zjabļiks
1988	Viss kārtībā	
2002–2006	Neprāta cena (TV series)	Leons
2004	Rudens rozes	Robežsargs
2007	Nerunā par to	Henrijs
2007	Rīgas sargi	Arnolds
2009–2017	UgunsGrēks (TV series)	Leons, Fēlikss
2012	Gulf Stream Under the Iceberg	
2012	Dream Team 1935	
2016	Swingers	Valdis
2021	The Year Before the War	Freud
2024	Marija's Silence	Leonid Zakovsky
