= Bitė Group =

Lithuanian telecommunications group

- Bitė Group Headquarters in Vilnius
- Type: Private
- Industry: Telecommunications
- Founded: 1995
- Headquarters: Vilnius, Lithuania
- Area served: Latvia; Lithuania
- Key people: Pranas Kuisys
- Products: Mobile telephony
- Revenue: €321.355 million (2023)
- Operating income: €64.244 million (2023)
- Net income: €55.982 million (2023)
- Owner: Providence Equity
- Parent: PLT VII Finance S.à r.l.
- Website: www.bitegroup.net

Bitė Group (Lithuanian: Bitės grupė) is a Lithuanian telecommunication conglomerate currently owned by Providence Equity Partners since 2016, having been owned by TDC in Denmark until 2007 and by Mid Europa Partners between 2007 and 2016. Of Baltic states, Bitė mainly operates in telecommunication sector in Lithuania and Latvia, but through its media business TV3 Group (which Bitė assumed through Providence's acquisition of Viasat's Baltic business in 2017), it has an additional presence in Estonia.

Bitė Group is a long standing regional partner of Vodafone, having first signed a Partner Network Agreement for its Lithuanian mobile service in 2003. The agreement was extended to its Latvian service in 2006.

For years, Bitė Group has been represented by Bite Finance International B.V., a company registered in the Netherlands. Since acquisition by US-based equity investment firm Providence Equity in 2016, it's represented by PLT VII Finance S.à r.l. registered in Luxembourg whose ultimate owner is Providence Equity GP L.P.. which is registered in the Cayman Islands.

== History ==
Bitė began its operation in Lithuania in 1995.

On 21 July 2003, Bitė signed a Partner Network Agreement for Lithuania with British multinational mobile telecommunication company Vodafone.

In 2005, Bitė entered Latvian market. Following this, Bitė's Partner Network Agreement with Vodafone was extended to its Latvian service in April 2006.

In early 2007, Danish company TDC announced the sale of Bitė Group to Mid Europa Partners.

In December 2015, Mid Europa Partners announced that it was selling the group to Providence Equity Partners; the sale was completed in February 2016.

In March 2017, it was announced that Providence was acquiring Viasat's Baltic media and satellite television business for €115 million from Swedish company Modern Times Group (MTG), which was in the process of transforming itself into a video game company. In May 2017, it was emerged that Providence-owned Bitė would be the party to purchase MTG assets in question. The sale was completed in October 2017. The newly formed pan-Baltic media company, initially named All Media Baltics, was renamed TV3 Group in 2019. In 2020, a bond issue was carried out, during which Bitė Group raised 620 million euros. In January 2023, TV3 Group, controlled by Bitė Group, signed an agreement to acquire radio stations operated by M-1.

== Operations ==
=== Lithuania ===
Bitė began its operation as a mobile network operator in 1995 with its services over GSM, becoming the second company to provide mobile telephony in Lithuania (the first being Omnitel, which was later merged with Teo and rebranded as Telia in 2017).

Bitė subsequently launched EDGE services (2.5G) in 2004, HSDPA services (3.5G) in 2006, and LTE-A service in 2014.

On 1 December 2025, Bitė will switch off 3G network.

=== Latvia ===
Bitė entered Latvian telecommunications market in 2005 through its subsidiary Bite Latvija.

=== Estonia ===
Bitė Group is yet to have a presence in Estonian telecommunications market, but it has expressed its intention to launch their business there once they win the Estonian 5G spectrum auction.

Meanwhile, TV3 Group's Estonian subsidiary AS TV Play Baltics operates direct-to-home satellite television service Home3 (formerly known as Viasat and TVPlay Home) for customers there and two other Baltic countries.

== Assets ==
Telecommunications

- Lithuania: UAB Bitė Group
  - UAB Bitė Lietuva
  - UAB TeleTower
- Latvia: SIA Bite Latvija
  - SIA TeleTower
  - SIA Unistars

Media (UAB All Media Group, d.b.a. TV3 Group)

- Estonia: AS All Media Eesti (television broadcaster)
  - Media Invest Holding AS (radio broadcaster)
  - All Media Digital OÜ
  - Buduaar Media OÜ
  - Artist Media OÜ
- Latvia: SIA All Media Latvia (television and radio broadcaster)
- Lithuania: UAB All Media Lithuania (television broadcaster)
  - UAB All Media Radijas (radio broadcaster)
  - UAB All Media Digital
- AS Go3 Baltics (operator of Home3, Go3 and pan-Baltic TV channels licensed in Estonia)
- Bite Broadcasting Services Ltd (operator of pan-Baltic TV channels licensed in the United Kingdom)
