= Gribi būt miljonārs? =

Latvian game show

- Logo
- Created by: David Briggs; Mike Whitehill; Steven Knight
- Presented by: Mārtiņš Ķibilds; Ģirts Līcis
- Country of origin: Latvia

Original release
- Network: TV3
- Release: 4 September 2002 – 2008

Gribi būt miljonārs? (English translation: Want to be a millionaire?) is a Latvian game show based on the original British format of Who Wants to Be a Millionaire?.

The show was hosted by Mārtiņš Ķibilds from 2002 to 2007, before being replaced by Ģirts Līcis for the final season.

Gribi būt miljonārs? was broadcast from 2002 to 2008. It was shown on the Latvian TV station TV3 on Wednesday at 20:20 (UTC+2).

== Rules ==
The main goal of the game was to win 50,000 lati (20,000 lati - 2003 to 2005 and 10,000 lati - 2002 to 2003) by answering 15 multiple-choice questions correctly. When a contestant got the fifth question correct, he would leave with at least 100 lati (50 lati - 2003 to 2005 and 25 lati - 2002 to 2003). When a contestant got the tenth question correct, he would leave with at least 1,000 lati (500 lati - 2003 to 2005 and 320 lati - 2002 to 2003). There were three lifelines - "fifty fifty", "phone a friend" and "ask the audience". Later, at the third season, there was sometimes a fourth lifeline, that you could get if you answer at least five questions. It was called, "three wise men". It meant, that in 30 seconds three celebrities could tell you what they think is the answer to the question.

== Prizes ==
Payout structure
Question number	Question value		
Question number	2002–2003	2003–2005	2005–2008
15	10,000 lati (€14,216)	20,000 lati (€28,431)	50,000 lati (€71,078)
14	5,000 lati (€7,108)	10,000 lati (€14,216)	25,000 lati (€35,539)
13	2,500 lati (€3,554)	5,000 lati (€7,108)	10,000 lati (€14,216)
12	1,250 lati (€1,777)	2,500 lati (€3,554)	5,000 lati (€7,108)
11	640 lati (€910)	1,250 lati (€1,777)	2,000 lati (€2,843)
10	320 lati (€455)	500 lati (€711)	1,000 lati (€1,422)
9	160 lati (€227)	250 lati (€355)	500 lati (€711)
8	80 lati (€114)	125 lati (€178)	325 lati (€462)
7	40 lati (€57)	80 lati (€114)	225 lati (€320)
6	30 lati (€43)	60 lati (€85)	125 lati (€178)
5	25 lati (€36)	50 lati (€71)	100 lati (€142)
4	20 lati (€28)	40 lati (€57)	80 lati (€114)
3	15 lati (€21)	30 lati (€43)	60 lati (€85)
2	10 lati (€14)	20 lati (€28)	40 lati (€57)
1	5 lati (€7)	10 lati (€14)	20 lati (€28)
Milestone Top prize

== Winners ==
There is only one winner in Latvian version, Elita Rumpe, who win 10,000 lati on 18 December 2002.

== Gallery ==
Fragment of the show: Ķibilds thanks contestant for playing
