= Edinburgh Television =

Defunct television station in Edinburgh, United Kingdom

Ownership
- Owner: Channel Six Broadcasting Ltd.

History
- Launched: 2000
- Closed: 2002

Availability

Terrestrial
- Craigkelly transmitting station: Channel 52

Edinburgh Television was an RSL television station catering Edinburgh, Scotland's capital. The station was owned by Channel Six Broadcasting.

== History ==
Edinburgh Television was set up by Channel Six Broadcasting, who also bid for a station in Dundee, which was overshadowed by David Rushton's plan for the capital. The station broadcast on UHF channel 52 delivering a text-based information service for most of the day. Around May 2000, broadcasts started.

In December 2000, Local Broadcasting Group acquired Edinburgh Television's licence, as well as a number of other RSL stations in the UK, while in September 2001, it announced that its frequency would be used by a local news channel for Edinburgh, which was critical of Scottish TV's Glasgow-centric news service.

== Programming ==
The station initially aired arts programming, though the bulk of its programming consisted of the Infostream service. It also relayed Sky News and produced a limited amount of original programmes. The channel also aired Art in Scotland, alongside Channel Six.

== See also ==
- Local television in the United Kingdom
