= Mārtiņš Ķibilds =

Latvian journalist (1973–2019)

- Born: July 23, 1973; Saldus, Latvia
- Died: October 26, 2019 (aged 46); Amsterdam, Netherlands
- Occupations: Television presenter, journalist
- Years active: 1994–2019

Mārtiņš Ķibilds (July 23, 1973 – October 26, 2019) was a Latvian journalist.

Ķibilds hosted Gribi būt miljonārs?, a local version of the game show Who Wants to Be a Millionaire?, from its inception in 2002 until 2007. He was producer and host of shows such as Atslēgas, Adreses and Kultūrdeva. Ķibilds was also the chairman of Latvian Architects' Association.
