= TV3 Group (Baltics) =

Media group of the Baltic States

TV3 Group (Baltics) is a pan-Baltic commercial broadcasting company owned by Providence Equity Partners through Bitė Group in Lithuania, previously a part of Viasat operations and then Modern Times Group. It is considered "the leading media group operating across Estonia, Latvia, and Lithuania".

== Assets ==
- Estonia
  - Television (TV3, TV6, TV3 Life, TV3 Gold)
  - Digital (TV3.ee (TV3 Uudised, Buduaar))
  - Radio (Star FM, Power Hit Radio, Star FM Eesti, Star FM+)
- Latvia
  - Television (TV3, TV6, TV3 Life, TV3 Mini, TV3 Plus)
  - Digital (TV3.lv (TV3 Play))
  - Radio (Star FM, Radio 3 (planned), Top Radio)
- Lithuania
  - Television (TV3, TV6, TV8, TV3 Plus)
  - Digital (TV3.lt (TV3 Play))
  - Radio (Radio 3, Power Hit Radio)
- Pan-Baltic
  - Streaming (Go3)
  - Television (Go3 Films, Go3 Sport (Open, 1, 2, 3, 4))
  - Satellite (Home3)

Following the Russian invasion of Ukraine, TV3 Group announced that it would cease broadcasting content produced in Russia.

== Sports coverage ==
Since at least 2023, TV3 Group has carried NBA and WNBA games across its 3-country territory.

TV3 is also the longtime television partner of the International Basketball Federation (FIBA).

In 2024, TV3 Group acquired the live sports portfolio of Viaplay Group, which includes coverage of the Premier League, UEFA Champions League, men’s national team association football, Formula One, and the National Hockey League.
