= Spēlmaņu nakts gada aktieris =

Latvian theatre award

Spēlmaņu nakts gada aktieris is an annual award given to best stage actor in Latvia.

Year	Winner	Play	Theatre
1994	Ģirts Ķesteris	Spoku sonāte, Ferdinando	Valmieras Drāmas teātris
1995	Ivars Puga	Salemas raganas	Latvijas Nacionālais teātris
1996	Armands Reinfelds	Kā lēna un mierīga upe ir atgriešanās	Jaunais Rīgas teātris
1997	Jakovs Rafalsons	Nāves deja	Mihaila Čehova Rīgas Krievu teātris
1998	Tālivaldis Lasmanis	Ivanovs, Varkaļu pagasta skolotājs, Kamīnā klusi dzied vējš	Valmieras Drāmas teātris
1999	Juris Bartkevičs	Paula kungs, ART	Dailes teātris, Mūris
1999	Ivars Stonins	Kaupēn, mans mīļais!	Liepājas teātris
2000	Rūdolfs Plēpis	Sapņu spēles jeb Dvēseles kumēdiņi	Daugavpils teātris
2001	Jakovs Rafalsons (2.)	Skapēna blēdības	Mihaila Čehova Rīgas Krievu teātris
2002	Aigars Vilims	Tumšie brieži, Pazudušais dēls	Valmieras Drāmas teātris
2003	Uldis Dumpis	Dzelzszāle, Ienesīgā vieta	Latvijas Nacionālais teātris
2004	Ivars Puga (2.)	Kam no Vilka kundzes bail?	Latvijas Nacionālais teātris
2005	Andris Keišs	Latviešu stāsti, Mēnesis uz laukiem, Līze Luīze	Jaunais Rīgas teātris
2006	Gundars Āboliņš	Soņa, Ledus. Kolektīva grāmatas lasīšana ar iztēles palīdzību Rīgā	Jaunais Rīgas teātris
2006	Artūrs Skrastiņš	Spilvencilvēks, Naži vistās	Dailes teātris
2007	Egons Dombrovskis	CV (Tēvocis Vaņa), Killera dienasgrāmata, Sniegbaltītes skola	Liepājas teātris
2008	Juris Lisners	Jūdas skūpsts, Smiltāju mantinieki (Mājās)	Latvijas Nacionālais teātris
2009	Vilis Daudziņš	Vectēvs	Jaunais Rīgas teātris
2010	Kaspars Znotiņš	Ziedonis un visums	Jaunais Rīgas teātris
2011	Andris Keišs	Otello	Jaunais Rīgas teātris
2012	Ģirts Krūmiņš	Oblomovs, Vigīlija. Sapnis par nomodu	Jaunais Rīgas teātris
