= Regīna Devīte =

Latvian actress

- Born: January 18, 1956 (age 70); Amur region, USSR ( now Russia)
- Occupation: Actress

Regīna Devīte (born January 18, 1956) is a Latvian actress. She is working as an actress and show manager at Valmiera Drama theater since 1978.Throughout her career, she has appeared in over 40 different plays and shows. She is best known for her role in a Latvian TV show ‘’ Ugunsgrēks’’.

== Early life ==
Regīna Devīte was born in Amur region, Russia, on January 18, 1956. She was born in exile, her family returned to Latvia, when Regīna was 1 year old. In 1974, she graduated from Valmiera Secondary School No. 4. In 1977 she graduated from the Riga Technical School of Cultural and Educational Workers, then continued her studies at the Institute of Theater Arts in Moscow, from which she graduated in 1985.

== Career ==
Regīna Devīte is working as an actress and show manager at Valmiera Drama Theater since 1978. Throughout her career, she has appeared in over 40 different plays and shows. Inga Jēruma's book "From Zenta to Zenta" about Regīna Devīte, the director's life and career in theater over 30 years, was published in 2012.

=== TV roles ===
- Astrīda ("Divi vienā", 2018)
- Zenta Upīte ("Zentas brīvdienas", 2013)
- Zenta Upīte ("UgunsGrēks", 2009–2017)
- Zenta Upīte ("Neprāta cena", 2008)
- Elizabete (“Salavecīša personiskā dzīve”, 1982)

=== Theatre roles ===
- Lūcija (A.Menčels "Rudenīgais blūzs", 2015)
- Katja (A. Ostrovska „Līgava bez pūra”, 2012)
- Pulkveža kalpone (J. Hašeka „Šveiks”, 2012)
- Dollija Hemma (T. Viljamsa "Orfejs pazemē", 2011)
- Mudrīte (E. Sniedze "Mākoņains, iespējams skaidrosies", 2011)
- Galmadāma (F. Šillera "Marija Stjuarte", 2010)
- Boila kundze (A. Kristi "Peļu slazds", 2009)
- Regīna Devīte (R. Devīte ''Sieviete ar dzeltenām brillēm'')
- Pindracīša ( Z. Neimanis '' Skroderdienas silmačos'')

== Popularity as Zenta ==
She gained wide recognition for her role as Zenta in the television series '' Ugunsgrēks''.As Zenta she has also played in the Latvian national television's series'' Neprāta cena'' and series '' Zentas brīvdienas''. The name Zenta comes from Regina's mother, who was called Zenta.
