= Svešā seja =

Latvian TV show

- Genre: Soap opera
- Created by: Inta Gorodecka
- Theme music composer: Musiqq Tommy Boyce; Bobby Hart
- Country of origin: Latvia
- Original language: Latvian
- No. of seasons: 2
- No. of episodes: 134

Production
- Producer: Inta Gorodecka
- Running time: 27 minutes
- Production company: SIA Ugunsgrēks

Original release
- Network: TV3
- Release: September 18, 2017 – May 17, 2018

Svešā seja is a Latvian television series that premiered in Latvia on TV3 on September 18, 2017. The series was created by the same team which had worked on popular Latvian TV series UgunsGrēks. The series starred actors Dārta Daneviča and Vita Vārpiņa from Dailes Theatre and actors Kaspars Dumburs and Egils Melbārdis from the Latvian National Theatre. The opening theme was "Atbalss" by the band Musiqq.

On April 11, 2018, it was announced that channel TV3 had decided to discontinue the series. The series finale aired on May 17, 2018.

== Characters ==
- Artis Muižnieks (Kaspars Dumburs) — anesthesiologist-reanimatologist, owner of Rihards' plastic surgery clinic, Rihards' illegitimate son. Wants to take revenge against Rihards for his mother's Žanna death. Džeina liked him, but Artis avoided her, while keeping secret that he is Džeina's brother. Later Rihards found out that Artis is his son. After father's death he owns half the clinic and father's house. Likes Laura.
- Madara Kreicberga (Dārta Daneviča) — nurse, owner of Rihards' plastic surgery clinic. In "Vītoliņi" guest house Jansons with Kazimirs kidnapped her and held her hostage at Jansons' art gallery. Escaped when police arrived. When returning from abroad found out that her husband Rihards is dead and that she now owns half of Rihards' clinic.
- Kristaps Cīrulis (Stefans) (Egils Melbārdis) — escaped from prison. After his wish for no one to recognise him, Laura operated a plastic surgery on him and gave him a "different face".
- Laura (Iveta Pole) — plastic surgeon at Rihards' plastic surgery clinic. Likes Artis.
- Ērika Muižniece (Vita Vārpiņa) — owner of the restaurant "Toskāna", Rihards' former wife. Has two children – Bruno and Džeina. Tends to secretly sneak out with Žoržu, to make Rihards jealous.

== Series overview ==
Season	Episodes	Originally released	
Season	Episodes	First released	Last released
1	66	September 18, 2017	December 21, 2017
2	68	January 29, 2018	May 17, 2018
