= UgunsGrēks =

Latvian TV soap

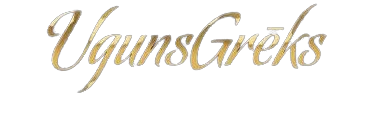
- Genre: Soap opera
- Based on: The Cost of Frenzy
- Written by: Gunta Kalniņa Inta Bernova Vilnis Bīriņš
- Directed by: Inta Gorodecka
- Starring: Uldis Dumpis; Regīna Devīte; Ilze Vazdika; Jakovs Rafalsons; Ilze Pukinska; Egils Melbārdis; Zane Daudziņa; Ģirts Ķesteris
- Theme music composer: Tumsa — "Mans neatklātais super NLO" (season 1-2); Kaža — "Tici vai nē" (season 3—9); Gunārs Kalniņš -"Divi Vēji" (season 10-15); Arturs Šingirejs (Dons) -"Tepat" (season 16-17)
- Country of origin: Latvia
- Original language: Latvian
- No. of seasons: 17
- No. of episodes: 1204

Production
- Producer: Baiba Saleniece
- Running time: 23-53 minutes

Original release
- Network: TV3 Latvia
- Release: 2009 – 2017

Related
- Zentas holidays UgunsGrēks Christmas

FireSin (Latvian: UgunsGrēks) is a Latvian daytime soap opera that was broadcast on TV3 Latvia from 2009 until 2017. It was one of the longest-running scripted television programs in Latvia, airing nearly every weekday from March 15, 2009. It last aired on 19 May 2017. UgunsGrēks is the sequel to the LTV1 show The Cost of Frenzy (Latvian: Neprāta cena). After a 5-year hiatus, the show got unexpectedly renewed for another season. It was confirmed by an article on April 11, 2022. The show has been available to stream on the platform Go3 since October 10, 2022, and was aired on February 13, 2023, on TV3, but the project was short-lived because the director Inta Gorodecka died on May 5, 2023, at age 65.

The show was created by Inta Gorodecka and Baiba Saleniece. The show's storylines were written by Inta Bernova and Gunta Kalniņa. The program featured an ensemble cast, headed by its longest-serving actors Ģirts Ķesteris as Leons Timmermanis, Jakovs Rafalsons as Vadims Felzenbahers, Zane Daudziņa as Helene Felzenbahere, Ilze Vazdika as Milda Upīte, Egīls Melnbārdis as Gunārs Liepiņš, Uldis Dumpis as Aivars Pētersons and Regīna Devīte as Zenta Upīte. In 2014, the show was the most-watched soap opera in Latvia, with an audience of an estimated 1 762 000 viewers. The series ended in May 2017 and was replaced by Svešā seja as a new day time soap opera, which was produced by the same creative team.

== Premise ==
Set in a seaside town, the series follows the daily lives of a luxurious hotel's (after Season 9, two hotels) staff and guests.

== Seasons ==
Season	Episodes	Originally aired		Viewers (average)
Season	Episodes	First aired	Last aired	Viewers (average)
1	55	March 15, 2009	June 16, 2009	210 800
2	83	August 24, 2009	January 13, 2010	213 700
3	72	February 8, 2010	June 10, 2010	245 300
4	73	August 22, 2010	December 23, 2010	226 700
5	93	February 13, 2011	June 22, 2011	236 200
6	82	August 21, 2011	December 23, 2011	215 600
7	71	February 13, 2012	June 14, 2012	221 500
8	60	September 10, 2012	December 20, 2012	213 800
9	68	February 18, 2013	June 20, 2013	194 700
10	60	September 9, 2013	December 19, 2013	185 500
11	69	January 20, 2014	May 29, 2014	164 900
12	68	September 15, 2014	December 19, 2014	184 200
13	80	January 19, 2015	June 8, 2015	190 000
14	60	September 7, 2015	December 17, 2015	190 032
15	64	February 1, 2016	May 19, 2016	193 393
16	70	September 19, 2016	December 30, 2016	154 500
17	76	January 30, 2017	May 19, 2017	183 200

== History ==
The storyline began in 2006 with a series called The Cost of Frenzy (Latvian: Neprāta cena). In March 2009 only ten days before the expected series premiere, TV3 Latvia came out with a disclaimer that The Cost of Frenzy would no longer be broadcast on the LTV1 network and would now be shown on TV3 Latvia with its new name UgunsGrēks. The new series brought new characters and multiple storylines over the years.

UgunsGrēks ended on May 19, 2017. After 17 seasons, the show's running channel decided to cancel the show. UgunsGrēks final episode was an hour long and TV3 Latvia showed a special live broadcast with the casts after party with actors from all the seasons. The creative team began to work on a new daily soap opera called Svešā seja, which premiered on September 18, 2017, in the same time slot that UgunsGrēks had aired. Svešā seja did not receive the same success that UgunsGrēks had, and was cancelled less than a year later on May 17, 2018, only ever airing 2 seasons.

== Storyline ==
When UgunsGrēks premiered in 2009, the TV series revolved around the tragedies and triumphs of the Pētersons family, their friends and enemies in little city near the sea where the Pētersons family-owned a hotel. Storylines in the show followed the lives of residents of the Peterson hotel with the usual threads of love, marriage, divorce, family life, and the intrigue of the resort's ownership.

Over time, new families with their own hotels were brought to the show to interact with the Peterson family and serve as competitors for more dramatic storylines. One of the longest-running storylines involved a doctor named Leon, his love life and happiness. From the beginning until the 9th season of the series Leon was the main leading male character in Ugunsgrēks. This plot-line was made even more complex when the love of his life Marta Peterson played by Dita Lūriņa was killed in the bomb explosion. After this accident, Leon was left blind and alone. The 9th Season he finally found his true love and married his love interest for 4 seasons – Elizabete Ziemele played by Maija Doveika. After this, Leon went to Germany and his storyline ended.

With Leon's storyline ending, the viewers were reintroduced with Leons daughter Ieva Timmermane now played by Inga Tropa. Ieva became even more involved in the storyline as the series showed the audience Āboltiņi family who had built a new hotel Mare SPA near the Peterson resort. A love triangle between Ieva, a son from the Āboliņi family and Viesturs, Aivars friend and his firm bought the hotel after Dana stole it from Ieva, in order to save the son she had to choose between. Their love triangle lasted for 3 seasons. The story-line ended in the 14th season when Aivars offered Ieva to go back to England and she did, so in result, she chose none of them.

== Cast ==
When UgunsGrēks debuted, the cast consisted of six main characters (Leons Timmermanis, Marta Pētersone, Aivars Pētersons, Oto Pētersons, Elza Timmermane, Rihards Baumanis). As the show continued, the cast increased to 12 actors, and more over the next years. Throughout the show's run, there were over 200 actors that had a role in the TV series. Ģirts Ķesteris is seen in most of the episodes, because he has been in the show from the beginning.

Original cast member Mārtiņs Freimanis, who played Oto Pētersons, remained on contract with Ugunsgrēks until his sudden death on 27 January 2011. In the series, Martiņš Freimanis' character Oto moved to England and was never heard from again.

Cast member Ģirts Ķesteris holds the record for appearing in the most episodes since the beginning of the series. The actor played two roles: Leons Timmernanis, the hotel doctor, and the role of his long lost twin brother Fēlikss Seņkovs from Russia.

In the final years of UgunsGrēks the casting director hired many new cast members to appeal to their younger viewers. The new cast members were Vanda Saulīte (Dārta Daneviča), Signe Kļaviņa (Anta Aizupe), Sandija (Marija Linarte) Olafs Birznieks, (Gints Andžāns).

The cast of UgunsGrēks
Character	Actor
Aivars Pētersons	Uldis Dumpis
Aldis Putniņš	Juris Lisners
Aleksis Grīnbergs	Ainārs Ančevskis
Alise Sokolova	Jana Lisova
Anna	Ilona Balode
Annija Lazdiņa	Ance Muižniece
Antons Dambītis	Rūdolfs Plēpis
Anna Jagudina	Polina Orlova
Augusts Andersons	Pāvils Andress
Beatrise Hartmane	Gunta Virkava
Cēzars Andersons	Normunds Bērzs
Česlavs Komarovskis	Uldis Anže
Dana Āboliņa	Līga Zeļģe
Daniels	Mārtiņš Meiers
Dāvids Ozols	Madars Zvagulis
Deniss Tarasovs	Ģirts Liuziniks
Dins	Jēkabs Reinis
Donāts Jagudins	Aldis Siliņš
Edgars Pētersons	Mārtiņš Freimanis
Edijs Āboliņš	Artūrs Dīcis
Elizabete Timmermane (ex. Ziemele, Tarasova, Andersone)	Maija Doveika
Elza Baumane	Ilze Ķuzule-Skrastiņa
Elīna	Laura Atelsone
Ernests Jansons	Uldis Norenbergs
Eva Grīnberga	(Ieva Pļavniece
Evelīna	Dana Lāce
Feldmanis	Juris Kalniņš
Fēlikss Seņkovs	Ģirts Ķesteris
Gatis Āboliņš	Mārtiņš Brūveris
Georgs Lapsa	Arnolds Osis
Guna	Anete Krasovska
Gunārs Liepiņš	Egils Melbārdis
Helēna Jagudina (ex. Felzenbahere)	Zane Daudziņa
Ieva Timmermane	Gabriela Utāne, Inga Tropa
Indulis Strautiņš	Jānis Jarāns
Ingeborga Bergmane	Zanda Štrausa
Intars	Emīls Kivlenieks
Ivo Balodis	Ivars Puga
Jana	Sarmīte Rubule
Jānis Bērziņš	Madars Zvagulis
Jānis Grīnbergs	Mārtiņš Liepa
Jānis Ziemelis	Voldemārs Šoriņš
Jānis Ziemelis Jr.	Ralfs Dragons
Jevgēnija Seņkova	Jekaterina Frolova
Jezups Martinovs	Kristaps Rasims
Juris Strazdiņš	Vilnis Briedis
Karīna Grāvīte	Zane Burnicka
Kaspars	Āris Matesovičs
Katrīna	Helēna Vasiļevska
Kitija Kārkliņa	Anna Šteina
Kriss	Ivars Lūsis
Krista Zariņa	Marija Linarte
Kristaps	Ivo Martinsons
Laimonis Blumbergs	Pēteris Liepiņš
Leons Timmermanis	Ģirts Ķesteris
Lidija Āboliņa	Olga Dreģe
Līga Eglīte	Kristīne Nevarauska
Luīze Apine	Madara Melne-Tomsone
Lūcija Andersone	Rasma Garne
Madara	Zane Meldere
Magda Zariņa	Daiga Gaismiņa-Šiliņa
Maksis	Arturs Krūzkops
Manfrēds Ķirsis	Edgars Pujāts
Mareks	Jānis Āmanis
Markuss	Rihards Lepers
Marta Timmermane	Dita Lūriņa
Megija	Karina Lučiņina
Miervaldis	Leons Krivāns
Milda Upīte	Ilze Vazdika
Mirdza Liepiņa	Indra Burkovska
Nikolajs Gončarovs	Ģirts Jakovļevs
Oksana Griščeņko	Jeļena Sigova
Olafs Birznieks	Gints Andžāns
Oto Pētersons	Mārtiņš Freimanis
Pēteris Jagudins	Andris Bērziņš
Ramona Vintere	Ieva Aleksandrova - Eklone
Rasa Dimaitīte	Liene Gāliņa
Rasma Blumberga	Indra Briķe
Rihards Baumanis	Artūrs Skrastiņš
Rita Liepiņa	Marija Bērziņa
Roze	Baiba Neja
Rūdolfs	Valdis Lūriņš
Sabīne Zivtiņa	Māra Mennika
Sandija	Marija Linarte
Santa Ziemele	Jūlija Ļaha
Sarmīte	Jana Herbsta
Serafima Seņkova	Veronika Plotņikova
Sibilla Gončarova	Lāsma Kugrēna
Signe Kļaviņa	Anta Aizupe
Silvija Felzenbahere	Ilze Pukinska
Sintija Saulīte	Evija Skulte
Sofija Hartmane	Elīna Dzelme
Solveiga	Anita Kvāla
Svjatoslavs Zaicevs	Uldis Siliņš
Dakteris Sūna	Juris Abramenko
Terēza Rakēviča	Marta Grase
Teodors Grīnbergs	Arno Upenieks
Vadims Felzenbahers	Jakovs Rafalsons
Vanda Saulīte	Dārta Daneviča
Viktorija	Inga Misāne-Grasberga
Viktors	Pāvels Griškovs
Visvaldis	Dainis Ozoliņš
Zenta Upīte	Regīna Devīte
Zigmārs Bergmanis	Aigars Vilims

== Executive producing and head writing team ==
- The co-creator and original executive producer- Baiba Saleniece
- Director- Inta Gorodecka
- The first long-term head writer- Gunta Kalniņa, Inta Bernova and Vilnis Bīriņš

== Domestic broadcast ==
According to MTG TV LATVIA, UgunsGrēks was the most widely distributed soap opera and TV show in Latvia with episodes not just broadcast via TV3 Latvia, but also via Kanals2 and as of June 2012, episodes were offered via TV3play.

== Related shows ==
=== The Cost of Frenzy ===
This series aired four days of the week and consisted of 5 main characters (Aurēlija Anužīte as Anna Pētersone, Juris Žagars as Roberts, Ģirts Ķesteris as Leons Timmermanis, Kristīne Nevarauska as Līga, Jakovs Rafalsons as Vadims Felzenbahers).

=== Zenta's holidays ===
This mini-series sitcom was shown on TV3 from August to October 2013. The series follows a character from UgunsGrēks, the hotel's maid Zenta Upīte, on her holidays. The cast consisted of Indra Burkovska (Dainuvīte), Baiba Neja (Dace), Ivars Kļavinskis (Zigis), Andris Bērziņš (Gastons) and Sergejs Čerņikovs (policeman).

=== Christmas special ===
At Christmas 2015, the cast of UgunsGrēks surprised their fans by releasing a Christmas special event. This special featured all of the major characters from the 14th season - Aivars, Milda, Lidija, Krista, Dāvids, Jezups, Magda, Intars, Sandija, Gunārs, Helēna, Fēlikss, Jevgēņija, Dana and Gatis. All the characters participated in Christmas activities – baking gingerbread, decorating a Christmas tree and performing. The special aired (repeatedly in 2016) at 8.00 pm on TV3 Latvia.

== Opening title sequences and theme song ==
The opening title sequences were different nearly every season from the show's debut in 2009, however there have been only 3 theme songs. The first title sequence of UgunsGrēks featured all characters from season one and the Martiņš Freimanis song "Mans neatklātais super NLO." The second season started with a different sequence, but the same theme song by Martiņš Freimanis. In the next years, the characters changed but the concept of the opening titles stayed the same, although the theme songs were different. From the third season to the ninth, the theme song "Tici vai nē" was performed by Kārlis Būmeisters. For the next five seasons the opening song Divi vēji was written and performed by Gunārs Kalniņš. In the last two UgunsGrēks had their theme song written and performed by Latvian pop singer Dons.
