= Channel 6 (San Rafael, Argentina) =

LV 84 TV Canal 6
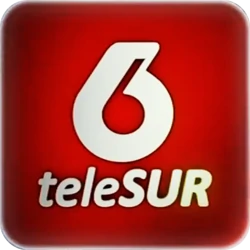
- San Rafael, Mendoza; Argentina
- Channels: Analog: 6 (VHF); Digital: 20 (UHF)
- Branding: Canal Seis Telesur

Programming
- Language: Spanish
- Affiliations: América TV

Ownership
- Owner: Grupo Álvarez; (TV Río Diamante S.A.)

History
- Founded: 19 April 1964

Technical information
- Licensing authority: ENACOM

Links
- Website: www.canal6sanrafael.com.ar

Canal 6 (call sign LV 84 TV) is a television station broadcasting from San Rafael, Mendoza. It carries programs from América TV and is owned by Grupo Álvarez.

== History ==
On 10 October 1963, through Decree 9066, the National Executive Branch awarded businessman Pedro Espasandín Rial a license to exploit the frequency of Channel 6 in the city of San Rafael, province of Mendoza. On December 9, with the publication of Decree 1333, the Executive Branch revoked it as illegitimate, declaring the granting of the permit established by the Decree annulled. 9066/63.

The license began its regular broadcasts on 19 April 1964 as LV 84 TV Channel 6 of San Rafael. The station was founded by brothers Andrés and Roberto Espasandín. Initially, the brothers were going to install the station in the city of Mendoza, however, at the request of Pedro (grandfather of Andrés and Roberto, who financially supported the project) they decided to install it in that city. Initially, most of the programs were live. A test color signal was made in 1969 to three or four television sets in the area.

In 1974, during the presidency of Isabel Perón, Channel 6 was nationalized. In 1978, it started conducting regular color tests with support from the Japanese company Hitachi.

The Federal Broadcasting Committee, through Decree 641 of 16 March 1979 and through Resolution 269 of 5 May 1981, called for competition to award the license to Channel 6. On 1 December 1982, through Decree 1376, the National State awarded the license to TV Rio Diamante.

In 1983, the Espasandín recovered the license; however, they had to pay for the color television equipment that the State incorporated into the channel.

In 1994, the channel was sold to a company (Diario Los Andes) operated by the owners of channels 7 and 9 of Mendoza (who also operated the LV10 radio station in the capital of Mendoza). Shortly after, the company was divided; the owners of 7 stayed with Channel 6, and those of 9 took charge of LV10.

In September 1997, Grupo UNO (today Grupo América) acquired 3 over-the-air television stations (among them, Canal 6).
