= TV6 (Estonian TV channel) =

Estonian television channel

Coordinates: 59°26′3.88″N 24°51′25.77″E

TV6 Estonia TV6 Eesti
- Logo used since 1 November 2022
- Country: Estonia
- Broadcast area: Estonia
- Headquarters: Peterburi tee 81, Tallinn, Estonia

Programming
- Picture format: 1080i (HDTV)

Ownership
- Owner: TV3 Group
- Sister channels: TV3; TV3 Gold; TV3 Life; Go3 Films; Go3 Sport

History
- Launched: 24 March 2008

Availability

Terrestrial
- ZuumTV: Channel 11

TV6 Estonia is an entertainment television channel broadcasting to Estonia featuring series, music, fashion and sports.

The channel's programming has been primarily geared towards men, and features a selection of cartoons, TV series and movies from comedy, reality, action-adventure, science fiction, fantasy, and horror genres.

Local programming typically features one local soap opera, one local reality television show, and a bevy of local sports shows and live sports transmissions.

Television shows broadcast on the channel are mostly U.S.-based, and current fare includes The Simpsons, Family Guy, Fresh Off the Boat, The Big Bang Theory, Agents of S.H.I.E.L.D., New Girl, and Last Man on Earth.

== History and availability ==
It was launched on 24 March 2008, as all of the current channels (the big three – ETV, Kanal 2, TV3) were obliged to have digital sister channels at or by the end of March 2008. On 9 January 2010, although TV6 Estonia did leave the free-to-air MUX1, it continues programming in terrestrial subscription-based MUX2, and is also available on cable and IPTV. Estonia turned analogue television transmissions off on 1 July 2010.

TV6, as with other channels of the All Media Baltics group in the Baltic states, switched to HD broadcasting on 26 July 2018.

== Selection of currently airing programming ==
As of January 2017:

- The A-Team (A-Rühm)
- Agents of S.H.I.E.L.D. (S.H.I.E.L.D.i agendid)
- Alarm für Cobra 11 – Die Autobahnpolizei (Kutsuge Cobra 11)
- America's Funniest Home Videos (Kõige naljakamad koduvideod)
- Ax Men (Kirvemehed)
- Beauty & the Beast (Kaunitar ja koletis)
- The Big Bang Theory (Suure paugu teooria)
- Blue Bloods (Politseipere)
- Bob's Burgers (Bobi burgerid)
- Bones (Kondid)
- Brickleberry
- Container Wars (Konteinerisõjad)
- Elu keset linna (Life in the Centre of the City, an Estonian soap opera)
- Extreme Makeover: Home Edition (Totaalne Muutumine: Kodu Eri)
- Family Guy (Perepea)
- Fresh Off the Boat (Värskelt maabunud)
- Hawaii 5-0
- Homeland (Kodumaa)
- Last Man on Earth (Viimane mees Maa peal)
- New Girl (Uus tüdruk)
- NCIS (NCIS Kriminalistid)
- Puhkus Mehhikos (Paradise Hotel, Russian version, reality TV)
- Power Hit Radio KICKSTART (night chat show)
- Royal Pains (Rikaste valud)
- Salem (Salemi nõiad)
- The Simpsons (Simpsonid)
- South Park
- Stargate SG-1 (Tähevärav SG-1)
- Strongman Champions League (Rammumees 2013)
- Top Gear
- The X-Files (Salatoimikud)
- Vikings (Viikingid)

== Previous programming ==
- 13: Fear is Real (13: Hirmul on suured silmad)
- Access Hollywood (Hollywoodi Südames)
- American Idol (Ameerika otsib Superstaari)
- The Cleaner (Puhastaja)
- Californication
- Criss Angel Mindfreak (Trikimees Criss Angel)
- The Dead Zone (Surnud Tsoon)
- Eureka
- Futurama
- Harper's Island (Harperi Saar)
- Highlander: The Raven (Surematu)
- Hommikustuudio (Morningstudio)
- How I Met Your Mother (Kuidas ma kohtasin su ema)
- In Plain Sight (Kaitseinglid)
- Journeyman (TV series) (Ajarändur)
- King of Kings
- Kinominutid (Movieminutes)
- Kodu Keset Linna (Home in the Center of the City)
- Kälimehed
- Life on Mars (Elu nagu Marsil)
- Mad About You (Hull Sinu Järele)
- Maximum Exposure (Meeletu Maailm)
- Mental (Hulluarst)
- My Name Is Earl (Minu nimi on Earl)
- Naistemaailm (Womensworld)
- Nash Bridges
- The Office (Kontor)
- The Pretender (Kameeleon)
- Prison Break (Põgenemine)
- Queer Eye (Appi Tõttab Stiilne Viisik)
- The Return of Jezebel James (Jezebel Jamesi tagasitulek)
- Scare Tactics (Hirmukool)
- The Sentinel (Tunnimees)
- Sex and the City (Seks ja Linn)
- Stargate Atlantis (Tähevärav Atlantis)
- The Strip (Kuldrannik)
- Swingtown
- The Unit (Üksus)
- Whacked Out Sports (Meeletu Maailm)
- Wipeout (Rajalt Maha)
