= Swingers (2016 film) =

Latvian film

- Theatrical film poster
- Directed by: Andrejs Ēķis
- Screenplay by: Rasa Bugaviciute-Pēce; Andrejs Ēķis
- Story by: Rasa Bugaviciute-Pēce
- Produced by: Kristians Alhimionoks; Zanda Senkova
- Starring: Intars Rešētins; Kristīne Nevarauska; Elīna Vāne; Ģirts Kesteris; Kristīne Belicka; Jurijs Djakonovs; Jānis Jubalts
- Cinematography: Imants Zakitis
- Edited by: Erkis Martins
- Production companies: Cinevilla Studio; Forum Cinemas; Platforma Filma
- Release date: 9 December 2016 (Latvia)
- Running time: 104 minutes
- Country: Latvia
- Language: Latvian

Swingers (Latvian: Svingeri) is a 2016 Latvian comedy film directed by Andrejs Ēķis.

== Plot ==
Swingers is a light comedy about relationships. The film follows a group of characters who all desire to flirt, whether it be at a swingers' party or during a sudden encounter on a balcony.

Kristīne Belicka plays the mistress of an older man with whom she is having relationship problems. She retreats to her balcony, where she meets an attractive young gay actor (Jurijs Djakonovs) who is also having relationship problems with his male partner. Crawling into his apartment through the balcony, she eventually seduces him and he has sex with a woman for the first time. It is revealed that the mistress and the gay actor have the same older male lover when he catches them together.

== Release and reception ==
The film was a top 10 box office hit in Latvia during 2016, earning €262,825 from 49,640 admissions within three weeks of its theatrical run. The project was creating using an unprecedented investment of €250,000 from Forum Cinemas and the film earned back a quarter of its budget during the opening weekend. The film was the seventh most successful Latvian film of 2017, earning 58,560 admissions.

Remakes of the film were created in Estonia, Finland, Lithuania, Norway, Russia and Ukraine. Adapters in Estonia were hesitant to re-make the film, alleging that the film was chauvinistic.

== Background ==
The filmmaker, Andrejs Ēķis, has stated that he made the film in order to disprove the famous saying that "Latvians do not talk about sex." Sex is a topic that is uncommonly explored in Latvian cinema.

== Cast ==
- Kristīne Belicka
- Intars Rešētins
- Kristīne Nevarauska
- Elīna Vāne
- Ģirts Kesteris
