= Tutas lietas =

Tutas lietas (literally Tuta's Things) is a Latvian video series and franchise for children, for the 2-5 target audience, available on digital platforms and linear TV channels. The author of the idea of the series is Marta Selecka, who in 2018 came to create a children's series together with a group of like-minded people. The first episode of the program was filmed on 8 March 2018 (first broadcast on LMT Straume smart TV service in June 2018). The main emphasis in the plot is on getting to know the world through games and songs. The main character of the series, the cheerful and kind-hearted Tuta (Liene Sebre), together with her play friends, Fox, Fenek and Badger, creates a friendly and safe environment for children to learn new knowledge and skills.

== Overview ==
Marta Selecka created the series in 2018 coinciding with the birth of her own child, by setting up her own company (which eventually became Ausma) to produce quality content for children. Her idea was supported by like-minded staff, who were also parents of young children, facing a context where the amount of children's programs in Latvian was virtually nonexistent. The series stars the human character Tuta (played in the original Latvian version by Liene Sebre) accompanied by a fennec fox name Fenec (Feneks in Latvian) teaching basic knowledge to children: learning to talk, colors, words, shapes and other key things. By early September 2018, the first full season had become a success on LMT's platform, with three out of the 21 episodes of the first season among the top streamed in the service.

The series also features original songs, mostly created by Laura Polence, who later on composed a string of successful songs for children in the Latvian language, boosting Ausma and its franchises's success. A songbook with 22 songs, mostly from Tutas lietas, was released in August 2021.

In addition to the video series, Tutas lietas also has an extensive line of events and merchandise, most of which is concentrated in Latvia. In 2024, a summer tour (Labu labais labirints, The Really Good Labyrinth) was held in seven Latvian cities.

== International versions ==
The Tutas lietas media franchise has been exported and adapted to several foreign markets, mostly on OTT services and YouTube. Most foreign language versions are reshot adaptations, however the Turkish version is a mere redub of the original Latvian show.

An English version, Nanny Tuta, is circulating on several streaming platforms, among them Toon Goggles.

A Ukrainian version (Тутині скарби) was released digitally shortly after the outbreak of war in Ukraine. Filming began in June 2022 and Tuta is played by Ukrainian refugee Lidiya Baranova, who fled to Riga in March 2022. The initial agreement with LMT, which financed part of the Ukrainian version and made available on the service, included eight episodes and Ukrainian versions of existing songs from the property.

The European Portuguese version, Tutices, was released in 2023. The adaptation was created by Latvian-turned-Portuguese Ilze Amândio, a Latvian who married a Portuguese man not long after moving in 2008. She discovered the original Latvian series while being pregnant of her first son, eventually becoming her first choice online. Over time, she felt an urge to create a localized version of the series, owing largely to the influx of Brazilian Portuguese content consumed by Portuguese children online, which she thought was troublesome for the target demographic, meaning that Tutices would easily fill the content gap. She had contacts with the original Latvian producers and began adapting season 1. Tuta is played by Inês Fonseca Shortly after its release, it inked a deal with RTP to release the episodes on its digital platform RTP Play and on the linear channel RTP África.

adaptēts arī citās valodās runājošām auditorijām — ir tapušas “Tutas lietu” versijas angļu (“Nanny Tuta”), zviedru (“Tottas Saker”), igauņu (“Tuta asjad”), portugāļu (“Tutices”) un ukraiņu valodā (“Тутині скарби”).
