= Kõrgelaid =

Island in Estonia

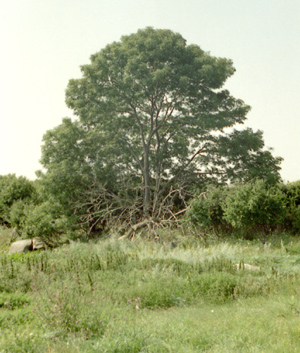
Solitary tree (Fraxinus excelsior) on Kõrgelaid

Kõrgelaid is a small, uninhabited, moraine-based island in the Baltic Sea, belonging to the country of Estonia. Its coordinates 58°45′09″N 23°05′35″E.

Kõrgelaid lies off the western coast of the Estonian mainland between the islands of Hiiumaa and Muhu, just south of the small island of Rooglaid. It is administered by Hiiu County. The island encompasses roughly 16 hectares and is part of the Hiiumaa Islets Landscape Reserve.

Kõrgelaid had previously been inhabited and even offered travelers inns in which visitors could stay. The island has now been uninhabited for several decades. In 2000, the island was the location for a reality television show titled Baltic Robinson, in which five Estonians, five Latvians and five Lithuanians competed against one another in a series survival challenges.

== See also ==
- List of islands of Estonia
