= Channel 6 virtual TV stations in Canada =

The following television stations operate on virtual channel 6 in Canada:

- CBMT-DT in Montreal, Quebec
- CBWT-DT in Winnipeg, Manitoba
- CHAU-DT-4 in Chandler, Quebec
- CHEK-DT in Victoria, British Columbia
- CHKM-DT in Kamloops, British Columbia
- CIII-DT in Paris, Ontario
- CIII-DT-6 in Ottawa, Ontario
- CIMT-DT-6 in Rivière-du-Loup, Quebec
- CJPM-DT in Saguenay, Quebec
