= Channel 6 TV stations in Canada =

The following television station broadcasts in analog on channel 6 in Canada:

- CFTK-TV-1 in Prince Rupert, British Columbia

== Defunct ==
- CFCN-TV-7 in Bassano, Alberta
- CFCN-TV-11 in Sparwood, British Columbia
- CFCN-TV-15 in Mount Goldie, British Columbia
- CFCN-TV-17 in Waterton Park, Alberta
- CFQC-TV-2 in North Battleford, Saskatchewan
- CFRE-TV-2 in Fort Qu'Appelle, Saskatchewan
- CFTS-TV in Teslin, Yukon
- CHAT-TV in Medicine Hat, Alberta
- CHBC-TV-8 in Canoe, British Columbia
- CJCB-TV-1 in Inverness, Nova Scotia
- CJCH-TV-6 in Caledonia, Nova Scotia
- CJOH-TV-6 in Deseronto, Ontario
- CKCK-TV-2 in Willow Bunch, Saskatchewan
- CKPG-TV-4 in Mackenzie, British Columbia
- CKRN-TV-2 in Ville-Marie, Quebec
