= NTV-5 =

- Country: Latvia
- Broadcast area: Riga, Pierīga
- Headquarters: Riga

Ownership
- Owner: Marina Gulmane

History
- Launched: 4 May 1992
- Closed: August 1996

NTV-5 was the first commercial television channel in Latvia and the first independent television channel, created two years after the Day of the Restoration of Latvian Independence. The channel started broadcasting on 4 May 1992 on UHF channel 31 (31. kanāls), but in August 1996, Andrejs Ēķis decided to merge NTV-5 and Picca TV, to create LNT. Its general director was Marina Gulmane.

== History ==
NTV-5 was publicly announced in December 1991, a few months after Latvia's de facto independence, when a contest for television presenters was announced in the press. Technical and preparational work had been carried out before, but during the contest, a wave of promising talents was discovered. This meant that, alongside the extant presenters on the state network Latvian Television, new, promising voices with a new visual language appeared, alongside a new news style, never before seen on national television. The author of the idea was Marina Gulimane, who became its director-general. Its line-up included several programs, including programs on national cultural societies, language learning (Scandinavian languages, Lithuanian and Estonian language courses), cycles on international literature and documentaries on Latvian history. NTV-5's news department was presided by journalist Kārlis Streips.

On 10 October 1996, VNĪA concluded an agreement with SIA "Televīzijas kompānija NTV-5" regarding changes to the contract for management of households at Elijas Street 17, Riga, concluded on 24 August 1995, creating more favorable conditions for SIA "NTV-5", however the Rural Project (Lauku projekts), which included the 17 Elijas Street building, had already been transferred to the Privatization Agency with the act of accepting the transfer concluded on 1 October 1996.

== Identity ==
The logo of the channel was a four-sided diamond shape. It had a copper version on studios and a plain white version as a channel bug.
