= Dagmāra Legante =

Latvian actress

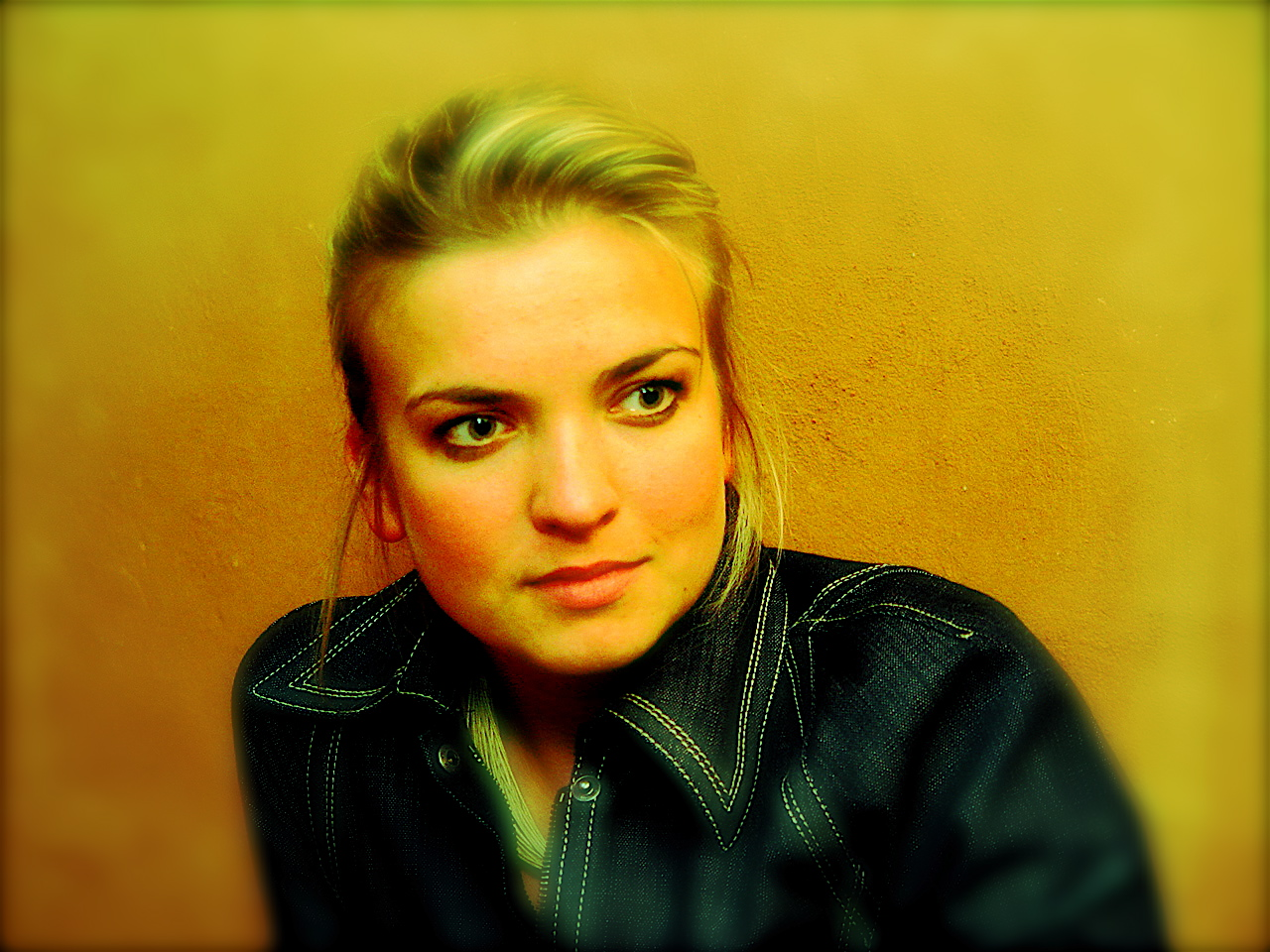
- Born: 9 December 1977 (age 48); Riga, Latvia
- Occupations: television personality, model, actress
- Spouse: Normunds Celmiņš
- Children: 2

Dagmāra Legante-Celmiņa (born Dagmāra Legante December 9, 1977 in Riga) is a Latvian TV personality, model, actress.

Legante has participated in several LNT humor and various other shows ("Oh Lord," "Oddly," "Music lesson," "Why not!"). In 2004, she became the winner of the TV show "Baltic Jungle Star" for the first season. In the final, Dagmāra Legante beat Renata Ražnauskienė from Lithuania and Koit Toome from Estonia. In 2008, together with Oleg Kuznetsov, participated in the TV3 show "Dancing with Star 2", but was voted out of the show. In 2010, together with Normunds Rutulis led the talent show "O! Karte Academy".

Legante has played in two drama theater plays: "The Fierce Tears of Peter von Kant" (2003), "Lodes over Broadway". Also, she has starred in Jānis Streičs's 2010 film Rudolf's Legacy.

Legante is married to businessman Normunds Celmiņš. On October 8, 2010 they had their first daughter Šarlote and in November 2013 their second daughter.

In 2018, together with Justs Sirmais, she co-hosted Supernova 2018.
