= 6 News =

6 News may refer to:

== News channels ==
- 6 News Australia
- 6 News Lawrence, in Lawrence, Kansas

== News departments ==
These television stations use the name "6 News" for their news programming:

- KFDM, in Beaumont, Texas
- KRIS-TV, in Corpus Christi, Texas
- WATE-TV, in Knoxville, Tennessee
- WLNS-TV, in Lansing, Michigan
- WRTV, in Indianapolis, Indiana
