= TV6 (Latvian TV channel) =

Latvian television channel

TV6 Latvia TV6 Latvija
- Broadcast area: Latvia

Programming
- Picture format: 1080i (HDTV)

Ownership
- Owner: All Media Latvia
- Sister channels: TV3; TV3 Plus; TV3 Life; TV3 Mini; Go3 Films; Go3 Sport

History
- Launched: April 22, 2007

Links
- Website: http://www.tv6.lv/

TV6 Latvia (Latvian: TV6 Latvija) is an entertainment television channel broadcasting to Latvia featuring series, music, fashion and sports. It was launched on April 22, 2007. The programmes broadcast on the channel include The Simpsons, United States of Tara, Las Vegas, Harper's Island, American Idol, Survivor, My name is Earl, Family Guy, Shark, CSI: Miami, The Office, Sex and the City and more.

The name, logo (to 2022) and graphics were borrowed from the Swedish channel of the same name, but their content differs somewhat as TV6 Sweden has a more male skew and doesn't carry fashion or music programming.

TV6 Latvia also broadcasts sports content: matches of the basketball teams and hockey teams, UEFA European competitions (e.g., the UEFA Champions League etc.) in 2019 moved to sport channel. Previously, the channel also broadcast matches of the IIHF Ice Hockey World Championships before the rights passed on the rivals LTV7 in 2017.

TV6, as with other channels of the All Media Baltics group in the Baltic states, switched to HD broadcasting on 26 July 2018.

On 26 August 2022, after 15 years using the Viasat era logo, the channel changed their logo. It was a natural step to change the visual identity of the channel, thus concluding the change of all brands within the "TV3 Group" media group. The logo change occurred during the program Farm (Lauku Sēta).
