= Picca TV =

- Country: Latvia
- Broadcast area: Riga, Pierīga
- Headquarters: Riga

Ownership
- Owner: Andrejs Ēķis

History
- Launched: April 1994
- Closed: August 1996

Picca TV was a Latvian independent television channel, active from April 1994 to August 1996, when it merged with NTV-5 to form LNT. Its studio was located at 40/42 Moscow Street (now Latgale Street) in Riga. Its founder and owner was Andrejs Ēķis. The company was registered on 19 January 1994 under the legal name Oriģināli televīzijas raidījumi (Original Television Programs) and broadcast in Latvian, Russian and English.

It was characterized for its entertaining, colorful and off-beat productions, such as colorful commercials, children's programs and so on. Its most popular program was Lampu drudzis, a quiz show presented by Viesturu Dūli where three participants answered questions which were revealed on a board. The channel also had the comedy series Pelikāns.

In 1996, its founder Andrejs Ēķis unilaterally agreed to merge with NTV-5. Some of Picca's staff continued to work for the new channel, some even continuing until its closure on 1 December 2019. LNT can be considered a successor of Picca, considering that it inherited its founder, who also became the new channel's general manager. On 28 February 2001, LNT repeated a set of five episodes of Pelikāns dated 1995, ahead of the 2001 Latvian municipal elections, before the 8pm news.
