= Channel Six Dundee =

Defunct television station in Dundee, United Kingdom

Ownership
- Owner: Channel Six Broadcasting Ltd.

History
- Launched: 31 May 2001
- Closed: May 2002

Availability

Terrestrial
- Angus transmitting station: Channel 49

Channel Six Dundee was an RSL television station operational in the city of Dundee, broadcasting from the Tay Bridge transmitter. It existed for one year before shutting down due to financial difficulties.

== History ==
Plans for a local television station covering Dundee started in 1999, but the plan was overshadowed by a similar station for Edinburgh, Edinburgh Television. In January 2000, Channel Six had entered into an agreement with AH Media, providing it with advertising sales. The channel initially projected a daily 18-hour schedule. The licence was approved in 2001. David Rushton, Channel Six's managing director, was confident in its success, especially since its transmitter was stronger than that of the Edinburgh station, operating at the same power as the mainstream channels, the BBC channels and Grampian. Dave Rushton invested £500,000 setting up the channel.

At 11:59pm on 31 May 2001, Channel Six started broadcasting, with nearly 125,000 viewers receiving the signal. Its first programme was the music video for Sing by Travis, followed at midnight by music videos and at 6am by cartoons. Its facilities were located at Seabraes Lane on the Perth Road, and was positioned as a youth channel, airing predominantly music videos, akin to MTV. During school holidays, it aired animated series. Further plans for the station included the launch of a record label by the end of the year, as a platform to launch local talents.

The station started with a staff of seven, however, by September, it was down to six, while the number of potential viewers increased to 142,000, with a 160,000 target by spring 2002. It was the only RSL station to deliver a full-time music service. The channel became a success among teens and young adults for its music videos.

Within less than a year, Channel Six lost money, which led to its liquidation due to the lack of a plan from viewers. Normal service continued until the channel's closure was announced. Around May 2002, the channel shut down. There was a petition which received 5,000 signatories, approximately 12.5% of the viewing audience, which was not approved. The company had to find a liquidator in July 2002. In August 2003, the company was formally liquidated.

Its archives were donated to Summerhall TV in 2015.

== Programming ==
Channel Six's programmes were a mix of music and arts aimed primarily at an under-35 audience. Music videos made up a significant part of its programming. Viewers could dial to the channel and request a music video to air. Local bands could send music videos and local artists could submit short films. In Control Shift, film students from the University of Dundee submitted their short films to air on the channel. It also aired previews of exhibitions and plays, as well as broadcast of local events, such as the switching on of the Roseangle Christmas Lights. The channel also aired Art in Scotland, alongside Edinburgh Television. Negotiations were underway in February 2002 to air Art in Scotland, which it produced, to the English-based Artsworld channel, while other local television stations were interested in its blocks of music videos.

== See also ==
- Local television in the United Kingdom
