= First Baltic channel =

Russian-language television channel in the Baltic states

First Baltic channel Pirmais Baltijas kanāls Pervõi Baltiiski Kanal Pirmasis Baltijos kanalas Первый Балтийский канал
- Country: Latvia
- Broadcast area: Estonia; Latvia; Lithuania
- Headquarters: Riga, Latvia

Programming
- Languages: Latvian; Russian
- Picture format: 16:9 576i

Ownership
- Owner: Baltic Media Alliance
- Sister channels: NTV Mir Baltic; REN TV Baltic

History
- Launched: 4 September 2002
- Replaced: ORT TEM
- Closed: 26 October 2021 (Latvia); 22 February 2022 (Estonia); 25 February 2022 (Lithuania); 2 March 2022 (PBK Estonia and "PBK Lithuania" in Latvia)

First Baltic channel (Latvian: Pirmais Baltijas kanāls, Estonian: Pervõi Baltiiski Kanal, Lithuanian: Pirmasis Baltijos kanalas, Russian: Первый Балтийский канал, romanized: Pervyy Baltiyskiy kanal; abbreviated PBK or ПБК) was a Baltic pay television channel based on the largest Russian Channel One to broadcast its programs in the Baltic states. It has been launched on 4 September 2002 in all thee Baltic states. The channel also broadcast the local news program Latvian time (Russian: Латвийское время) since June 2003.

The channel has ceased broadcasting in Latvia on 26 October 2021 due to misinformation about COVID-19 and two other violations. Following the Russian invasion of Ukraine in 2022, its license was revoked and the channel was effectively banned in all three Baltic States.

== Other channels ==
=== First Baltic music channel ===
First Baltic music channel (Latvian: Pirmais Baltijas muzikālais kanāls; Russian: Первый Балтийский музыкальный канал) was a Russian-language music television channel launched in 2005. The channel was broadcasing in Estonia, Germany, Latvia, Lithuania, Russia and Ukraine. The channel ceased broadcasting on 1 November 2017 and was replaced by Dom Kino.

=== First Baltic channel in Estonia ===
First Baltic channel had the localized version of it for Estonia.

In Estonia First Baltic channel co-operated with the news portal Delfi and the newspaper MK-Estonia. Delfi portal also offered news bulletins of the program Estonian News (Russian: Новости Эстонии) for viewing.

=== First Baltic channel in Lithuania ===
First Baltic channel had the localized version of it for Lithuania.

On 15 October 2013, broadcasting of this channel in Lithuania was suspended by court decision for three months due to broadcasting of the program "Man and the Law" (in Russian: Человек и закон) with a report on January events of 1991 in which the attack by the Soviet army and special units was denied. Jolanta Butkevičienė, chairman of the board of BMA Lietuva apologised to residents of Lithuania for "a program about the bitter events of 13 January 1991 that offended the civil feelings of every Lithuanian for the whole country". Channel broadcasting in Lithuania was resumed on 15 January 2014, but the program "Man and the Law" is no longer broadcast in Lithuania and other Baltic countries.

On 25 February 2022, the channel broadcasting in Lithuania was suspended for a period of three years due to warmongering and spreading Russian propaganda. The channel didn't restart its broadcasting since.

=== PBK Estonia and PBK Lithuania ===
On 20 April 2021 PBK Estonia (PBK Igaunija) or PBK+ was launched in Latvia and it was not the Estonian version of First Baltic channel. The channel broadcast films and other programs from the main channel.

On 1 October 2021 PBK Lithuania (PBK Lietuva) was launched in Latvia to broadcast its programs from Russian NTV channel.

Both of them has ceased broadcasting on 2 March 2022 due to the revocation of its broadcasting licence.
