= TV3 Life =

- Country: Latvia
- Broadcast area: Latvia, online
- Headquarters: Riga

Programming
- Picture format: 1080i (HDTV)

Ownership
- Owner: All Media Latvia
- Sister channels: TV3; TV6; TV3 Plus; TV3 Mini; Go3 Films; Go3 Sport

History
- Launched: 1 March 2020

Links
- Website: Official website

TV3 Life is a Latvian television channel, created in 2020 to replace LNT. Its programming consists mainly of national and international lifestyle programming.

== History ==
The channel traces back to the merger between LNT and TV3, approved on 9 January 2012, where both channels would continue operating their separate news units. Seven years later, on 7 November 2019, All Media Baltics announced the shutdown of LNT, being replaced by a new channel, part of a larger plan to unite all channels under the TV3 brand.

On 24 January 2020, it was announced Latvian regulator that NEPLP approved the conversion of LNT into TV3 Life, effective 1 March. The new plan involved the reduction in the amount of generalist television networks into niche channels would reduce the level of competition.

Among the launch titles were Latvian series Viņas melo labāk and miniseries Viņš. Robertiņš.

== In Estonia ==
The Estonian version of the channel was announced in late January 2022 and started broadcasting on 1 March 2022, replacing the Russian-language 3+ channel. Most of the content was acquired, while original programming was kept at a minimum due to high costs. The new channel refrained from airing Novosti Tallinna (Новости Таллинна), which had 260,000 viewers on 3+ Estonia, instead moving it to three channels — Duo 7 (a Russian-language channel from Postimees Group), 1+2 and TVN.
