= TV3 (Estonian TV channel) =

Estonian television channel

Coordinates: 59°26′4.17″N 24°51′27.04″E

TV3 Estonia TV3 Eesti
- Country: Estonia
- Broadcast area: Estonia and Worldwide

Programming
- Picture format: 1080i HDTV

Ownership
- Owner: TV3 Group
- Sister channels: TV6; TV3 Gold; TV3 Life; Go3 Films; Go3 Sport

History
- Launched: 6 March 1996

Links
- Website: tv3.ee

Availability

Terrestrial
- Elisa: MUX6, DVB-T, SD (Pay TV)
- Levira: MUX4, HEVC, DVB-T2, Full HD

TV3 (Estonian: TV kolm) is a commercial television channel targeted at an Estonian language audience owned by Providence Equity Partners.

== History ==
It was founded in 1996 after two recently established television stations, EVTV and RTV, were merged.

TV3 has three sister channels. TV6 is a television channel targeted at entertainment television channel in Estonia, launched in 2008. TV3 Life is an entertainment television channel, launched as a digital sister channel to TV3 in 2022. Third channel TV3 Gold was launched in 2025.

For several years, TV3 had better ratings than the other private channel, Kanal 2. The situation changed in 2006, when Kanal 2 made some big changes in their programme. TV3 ratings fell and shows had problems getting enough viewers to reach the Top 10 of the week. Later that year, programme director Jüri Pihel left TV3.

In 2009 all Baltic TV3 channels introduced new red-white visual identity, logo and slogan. The slogan was "Tere tulemast koju!" (lit. 'Welcome home!'). News programme "Seitsmesed uudised" (lit. 'News at 7') was discontinued and changed with a new "TV3 uudised" (TV3 News), which had the same format as Latvian and Lithuanian TV3 News programmes, the program is returning in 2023.

In January 2011 Mikko Silvennoinen, a Finnish television host, journalist and producer, was hired as the new programme director. In February TV3 changed their news programme format and "Seitsmesed uudised" was brought back. On 15 August, TV3 once again changed their visual identity and logo from red to purple, which was so far used in Norwegian, Danish, Hungarian and Slovenian TV3s. Also a new slogan was introduced: "Rohkem elu, rohkem meelelahutust!" (lit. 'More life, more entertainment!').

TV3, as with other channels of the All Media Baltics group in the Baltic states, switched to HD broadcasting on 26 July 2018.

== Currently airing (as of June 2014) ==
=== Estonian shows and series ===
Original name	English translation	Notes
Eesti otsib superstaari	Estonia's Looking for a Superstar	Estonian version of Pop Idol
Elu keset linna	Life in the middle of the city	drama series
Faktuaalne kaamera	Factual Camera	Sketch comedy
Heimari kokaklubi	Heimar's Cooking Club	Cooking
Kaua võib!		
Kolmeraudne	Triple-Barrel Shotgun	Talkshow
Kättemaksukontor	Revenge office	Comedy-crime series
Naistesaade	Women's Show	Fashion, clothing, makeup
Nurjatud tüdrukud	Mean Girls	Drama series
Nurgakivi	Cornerstone	Building, architecture, interior design
Ment	A Cop	Sitcom
Omakohus		
Randevuu	Rendezvous	Dating Show, Estonian version of Russian show Давай поженимся!
Seitsmesed uudised	News at 7	News
Sind otsides	Looking for you	Reality series, Estonian version of Russian series Жди меня
Suletud uste taga	Behind Closed Doors	Series of real-life stories
Stiilipäevik	Style Diary	Style makeover show
STOP!	—	Traffic topics
Teekond iseendani	Road to Yourself	Reality series about alternative medicine

=== Foreign shows and series ===
Original name	Estonian translation	Origin
America's Funniest Home Videos	Kõige naljakamad koduvideod	United States
Blue Bloods	Politseipere	United States
The Bold and the Beautiful	Vaprad ja ilusad	United States
Britain's Got Talent	Briti Talent	United Kingdom
Bones	Kondid	United States
Castle	—	United States
CSI: Crime Scene Investigation	CSI: Kriminalistid	United States
CSI: Miami	—	United States
CSI: NY	CSI: New York	United States
The Event	Sündmus	United States
The Finder	Leidja	United States
Glee	—	United States
Hawaii Five-0	Hawaii 5-0	United States
Hercules: The Legendary Journeys	Herakles	United States
Homeland	Kodumaa	United States
Knight Rider (1982 TV series)	—	United States
Lie to Me	Vale jälgedel	United States
MasterChef	Meisterkokk	United States
Midsomer Murders	Midsomeri mõrvad	United Kingdom
Modern Family	Moodne perekond	United States
My Kitchen Rules	-	Australia
Psych	Meisterdetektiiv Spencer	United States
Top Gear	—	United Kingdom
The A-Team	A-Rühm	United States
de:We are Family! So lebt Deutschland	Selline on elu	Germany
Wipeout	Rajalt maha	United States
Xena: Warrior Princess	Sõjaprintsess Xena	United States
Under the Dome	Kupli all	United States
The Americans	Ameeriklased	United States
Alarm für Cobra 11	Kutsuge Cobra 11	Germany
My Little Pony: Friendship Is Magic	Minu Väike Poni: Sõprus On Imeline	United States/ Canada

== Logos ==
TV3 logo used up until 2009.

Logo 2011–2015.

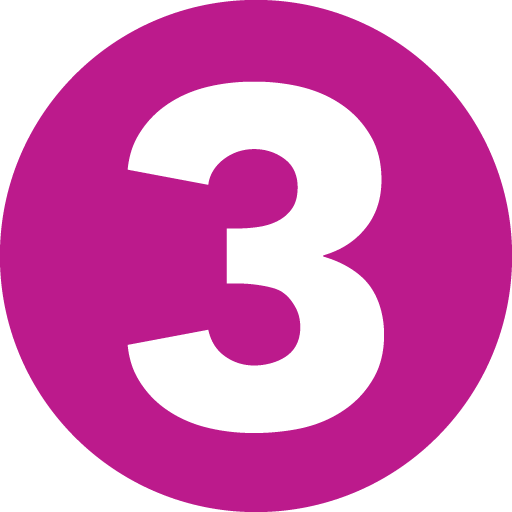
Logo 2015–2019.

2019–Present

== See also ==
- List of Estonian television channels
- TV3 (Viasat)
