= TV5 (Latvian TV channel) =

Latvian television channel

- Country: Latvia
- Broadcast area: Latvia
- Headquarters: Riga, Latvia

Programming
- Language(s): Russian
- Picture format: 576i (16:9 SDTV)

Ownership
- Owner: Modern Times Group

History
- Launched: 1 June 1996; 29 years ago
- Closed: 31 March 2016; 9 years ago
- Former names: TV Riga (1996-2001)

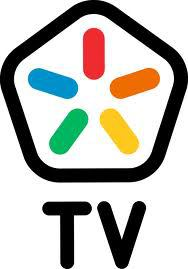
The logo was from 2001 to 2011 and from 2011 to 2012 was a silver color.

TV5 was a Latvian television channel, created in June 1996. All programs were broadcast in Russian. The channel showed Russian serials, movies, news and hockey broadcast out of Arēna Rīga. Until October 2001 the name was TV Riga. TV5 was owned by Modern Times Group. Financial reasons forced TV5 to cease broadcast in March 2016.

== History ==
In June 1996, TV Riga started broadcasting. This channel broadcast took place in the Riga Radio and TV Tower. The broadcasting radius was 70 kilometers around Riga. In 1999, for a short period, the channel license was revoked because the National Radio and Television Council complained about channel activity, but in order to obtain the permission to broadcast the channel in March 2001, it resumed its activities.

On 1 October 2001 TV Riga changed its name and began to broadcast as TV5. Initially, TV Riga broadcast in Latvian and Russian, but with the renaming the Latvian ceased.

TV5 reached 80% of the Latvian territory. It was one of the Latvian television channels whose programming was done completely in Russian. Recorded programs were subtitled in Latvian, but live programming in Russian was not translated. This channel was also available on cable television and internet.

In March 2010, together with TV5, LNT acquired the Latvian company "Independent national media".

On 14 December 2010 at 14.00 the signal of TV5 via Astra 4A satellite, served by SES Astra, was paused. SES Astra explained it with the channel debts, but the channel management avoided giving any explanations.

On 9 January 2012, the channels TV5, LNT and Kanāls 2 became the owner of the Swedish media company Modern Times Group.

TV5 had extended periods of time working at a significant loss and to reduce LNT's losses, it was decided that TV5 was to be terminated for financial reasons on 31 March 2016.
