= TV3 Plus =

Latvian television channel

TV3 Plus is a Baltic pay television channel owned by the Providence Equity Partners broadcasting to the community in the Baltic states. It was launched on 1 November 2003 in Latvia.

Its programming consists of simulcasts of many global entertainment shows, and, in the past, benefitted from MTG's ownership in STS Media and Peretz.

TV3 Plus was the second most popular channel in Latvia's Russophone market with a viewing share of 5.2% in May 2007, ahead of REN TV Baltic, but after the dominating First Baltic channel.

TV3 Plus, as with other channels of the All Media Baltics group in the Baltic states, switched to HD broadcasting on 26 July 2018.

Since the Russian invasion of Ukraine, from 28 February 2022, TV3 Group has decided to stop rebroadcasting content produced in Russia, providing additional access to Ukrainian and world news channels. The original Estonian channel closed on 1 March 2022 being replaced by TV3 Life; the decision was taken weeks before the invasion of Ukraine started. However, the decision backfired and a new Estonian version opened one month later on 1 April. This version would close on 10 March 2025, being replaced by TV3 Gold, a series channel.

The Lithuanian version opened on 1 June 2022. It was created in response to the increase of illegal methods of receiving banned Russian channels.
