= Latvijas Neatkarīgā Televīzija =

Company based in Latvia

- LNT logo
- Country: Latvia
- Broadcast area: Latvia, online
- Headquarters: Elijas iela 17, Riga (1996–2016)

Programming
- Language: Latvian
- Picture format: 1080i (HDTV)

Ownership
- Owner: Modern Times Group (2012–2018); All Media Baltics (2018–2020)

History
- Launched: 29 August 1996
- Closed: 1 March 2020
- Replaced by: TV3 Life

Links
- Website: LNT

Latvian Independent Television (Latvian: Latvijas Neatkarīgā Televīzija, LNT) was a major private television company in Latvia, founded in 1996. LNT featured TV series, news and entertainment programmes, airing 24 hours a day in Latvian. It went off the air on 1 March 2020, and was replaced by TV3 Life.

In March 2009 it was the most viewed television channel in Latvia, from research data by TNS Latvia. LNT was switched on 18.8% of the time in March, according to LETA.

== History ==
The predecessors of LNT were the first private Latvian TV station - news channel NTV-5 launched on 4 May 1992, and the morning television channel Picca TV which was launched in 1994 by entrepreneur Andrejs Ēķis. Already at the end of 1994, merger talks between the two emerged, but these were just rumors. Both companies formalized their merger on 16 February 1996. The joint bid for the third national network was approved on 20 March 1996. The merged LNT started on 29 August 1996. The new station positioned itself as a challenger to the then-monopoly in Latvia of the state broadcaster Latvian Television and declared itself as the "first nationwide, family entertainment channel", broadcasting locally produced news programs and imported films and entertainment, which at the represented 40% of the airtime.

In the beginning, most of the private programming was acquired from Russian media companies, but by 2002 it was reported that the company had made deals with Western companies such as Paramount, Warner Bros. and BBC.

In December 1999, Polsat founder Zygmunt Solorz-Żak bought the channel, aiming to merge its management with Estonia's TV1 and Lithuania's BTV to establish a Baltic television network. Then in August 2003, Polsat announced its intentions to unload its Latvian assets to News Corporation. The channel started providing a morning news service on 5 October 2004, 900 sekundes, the first of its kind in Latvia.

On 8 August 2007, Rupert Murdoch's News Corporation acquired 100% of LNT and 70% of its sister channel TV5 for an undisclosed sum.

On 9 January 2012 it was announced that the channel would be bought by the media conglomerate Modern Times Group together with the Russian language channel TV5 and the Latvian Music Channel (now: Channel 2) for an undisclosed sum. The move was later approved by the Council of Competitiveness of Latvia on the condition that TV3, which MTG already owned, and LNT would retain independent news boards for at least five years.

Since October 2017 the channel was a part of All Media Baltics, a company owned by investment firm Providence Equity Partners. LNT, as with other channels of the All Media Baltics group in the Baltic states, switched to HD broadcasting on 26 July 2018.

On 8 November 2019, it was announced that the channel LNT would be replaced by a new channel for women named TV3 Life, a sister channel of TV3. On 1 December 2019, the very last edition of LNT News aired. On 1 January 2020, LNT had new idents. On 1 March 2020, LNT was replaced with TV3 Life.

== Achievements ==
In 2007, the channel LNT took the first place in the list of the most loved brands in Latvia in the television category, and the sixth place in the list of brands of all industries. The same year the network introduced a symbol pin for Lāčplēsis Day, which was subsequently supported by the Latvian Ministry of Defence – a victory sign-shaped Latvian flag ribbon worn on the left chest. Often it is worn throughout November by many Latvians ever since.

In 2008, Haralds Burkovskis, the host of the LNT channel's "LNT Top 10" and "Made in Latvia" (Ražots Latvijā) programs, received the Cicero Award for excellence in journalism. The morning program "900 seconds" produced by "LNT News Service" received an award from the National Radio and Television Council (NEPLP) as the best television program of the year. In the "European Hit Radio" nomination, the "Best advertisement of the year – media" award was won by the radio advertisement "Sveša jīva" created by the LNT TV series.

On 20 April 2009, LNT channel was presented with the "Zelta vilnis" (Golden Wave) awards in the following nominations: "News program of the year" - LNT program 900 seconds (900 sekundes), "Documentary program of the year" – LNT program at Degpunktā (Action/Boiling Point), "Special edition of the year" – LNT program Goodness Day, "Producer of the Year" – LNT creative director Niks Volmārs, "Television face of the year" – LNT program and TV show host Māris Grigalis, "Musical show of the year" – LNT show Singing families (Dziedošās ģimenes), "Translation of the year" winner of the Young Wave 2009 competition coverage on LNT and TV5 channel, "Television face of the year" – LNT project manager Lauris Reiniks, "Lifestyle program of the year" – LNT program Sirmais Food Karate (Sirmā ēdienkaratē).

On 4 May 2009, Katrīne Pasternaka, the host of LNT's charity actions "Kindness Day" (Labestības diena) and "Angels over Latvia" (Enģeļi pār Latviju), received the Order of Three Stars. In the "Password 2009" social category, the LNT charity campaign "Angels over Latvia" won.

On 22 March 2010, the Golden Wave (Zelta vilnis) awards were presented to LNT channel in the following nominations: "News program of the year" – LNT program 900 seconds, "Entertainment show of the year" – LNT show Latvian Golden Talents (Zelta talants) 2010, "Producer of the Year" – LNT project Goodness Day, Ilze Ancāne, producer of the Singing Family of Latvia and Voice of the Nation, "Life style program of the year" – LNT program Housing Question, "15 minutes of glory of the year" - Kaspars Zlidnis and Latvian Street gymnasts LNT Latvian Golden Talents.

The LNT channel received the Cicero Award of the Latvian Academy of Sciences for the project "Kindness Day".

== See also ==
- Television in Latvia
