= TV3 (Latvian TV channel) =

Latvian television channel

TV3 Latvia TV3 Latvija
- Country: Latvia
- Broadcast area: Latvia, online
- Headquarters: Riga

Programming
- Picture format: 1080i (HDTV)

Ownership
- Owner: All Media Latvia
- Sister channels: TV6; TV3 Plus; TV3 Life; TV3 Mini; Go3 Films; Go3 Sport

History
- Launched: 19 September 1998

Links
- Website: Official website

TV3 Latvia (Latvian: TV trīs) is a Latvian commercial television channel targeted at a Latvian language audience owned by All Media Baltics, a company owned by investment firm Providence Equity Partners.

== History ==
Screenshot of TV3 Latvia in 2009

Kinnevik was first involved on Latvian television in 1993, by sharing airtime on 31. kanāls in the Riga area, as well as by distributing American and Australian TV series to LTV1 and LTV2. TV3 occupied the frequency on Fridays and Saturdays. The initial agreement ended on 5 May 1996 due to financial difficulties and as a sign of protest against the merger of two stations to create LNT, which occupied the former ORT network.

TV3 was launched on 19 September 1998 replacing 31. kanāls, but did not receive a terrestrial license until 2001. The channel has since increased its viewing share to become the most popular channel in Latvia as of September 2007, surpassing its then-closest rival LNT.

Until 2013, there was a free-TV terrestrial TV channel, since 2014 it became a pay channel, terrestrial TV. Initially, it was planned to leave the free channel, already in 2012, but the media regulator forbade it. Changes took place along with LNT.

TV3, as with other channels of the All Media Baltics group in the Baltic states, switched to HD broadcasting on 26 July 2018.

The next step for the channel's development was December 2019 when changed stamp and starting 2020, when the LNT News Service was reorganized and merged with the News Service of the TV3 channel, news service a new look as well as a new morning news show 900 sekundes (previously, LNT was seen from 2004 to 2019).

The network also has four sister channels: TV3 Life (lifestyle programming), TV3 Mini (children's programming), TV3 Sport and TV3 Film.

== Programming ==
Acquired programming on TV3 include CSI: Crime Scene Investigation, CSI: Miami, CSI: NY, CSI: Vegas, Bones, Castle, Lie to Me, Servant of the People and several other shows. The channel also features many Latvian programmes, including the news programme TV3 Ziņas (TV3 News), Degpunktā (In the spotlight), investigative news programme Nekā personīga (Nothing Personal) and TV series UgunsGrēks, Svešā seja, Viņas melo labāk and Nemīlētie, as well as entertainment and musical programs. Also airing the sport's events like Ice Hockey World Championships (from 2000 to 2017), FIBA Basketball World Cup and EuroBasket (since 2002, with exceptions 2019 FIBA Basketball World Cup and EuroBasket 2022, they were only shown by TV6.) and Formula One (from 2009 to 2010).

== Logos ==
2002–2009

2009–2013

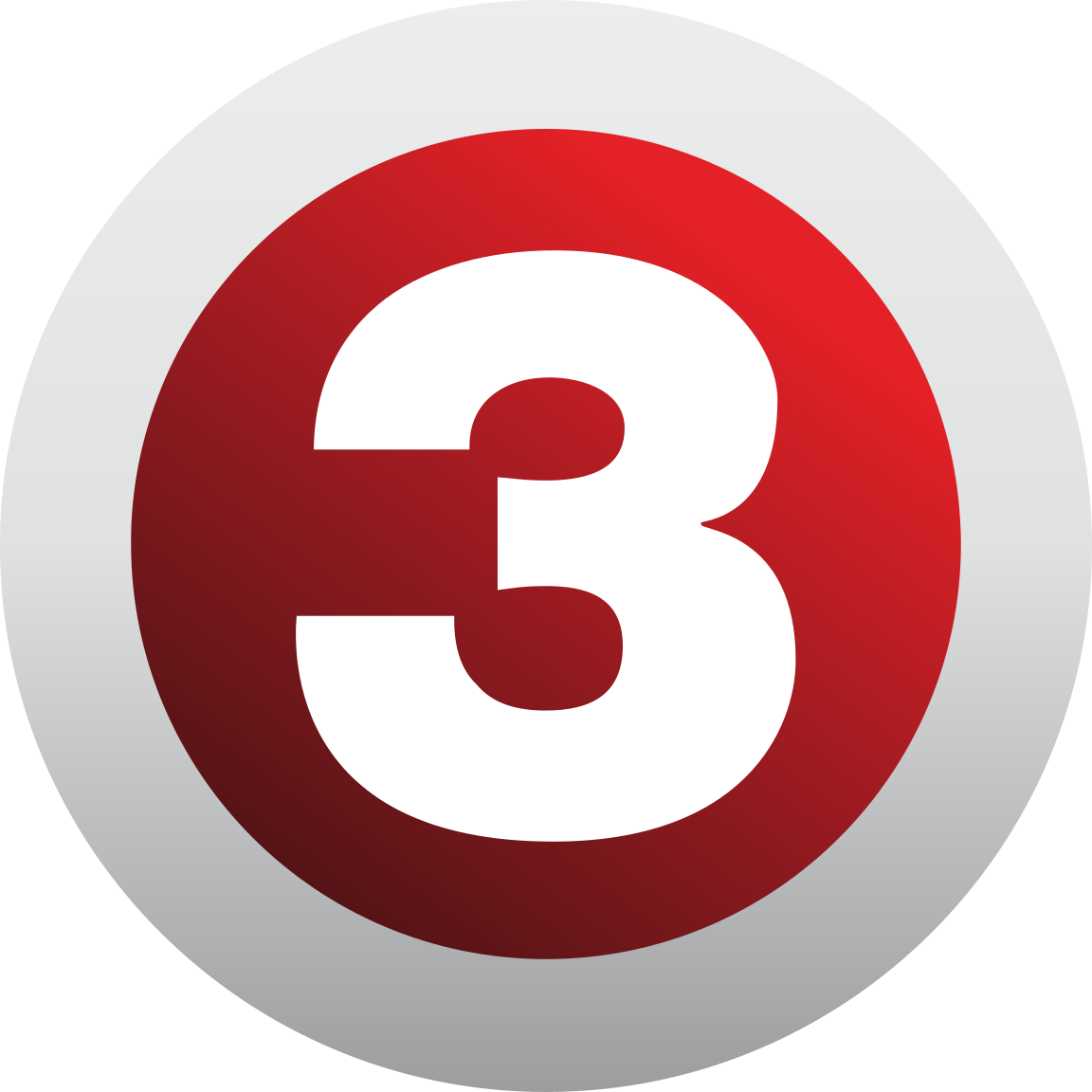
2013–2018

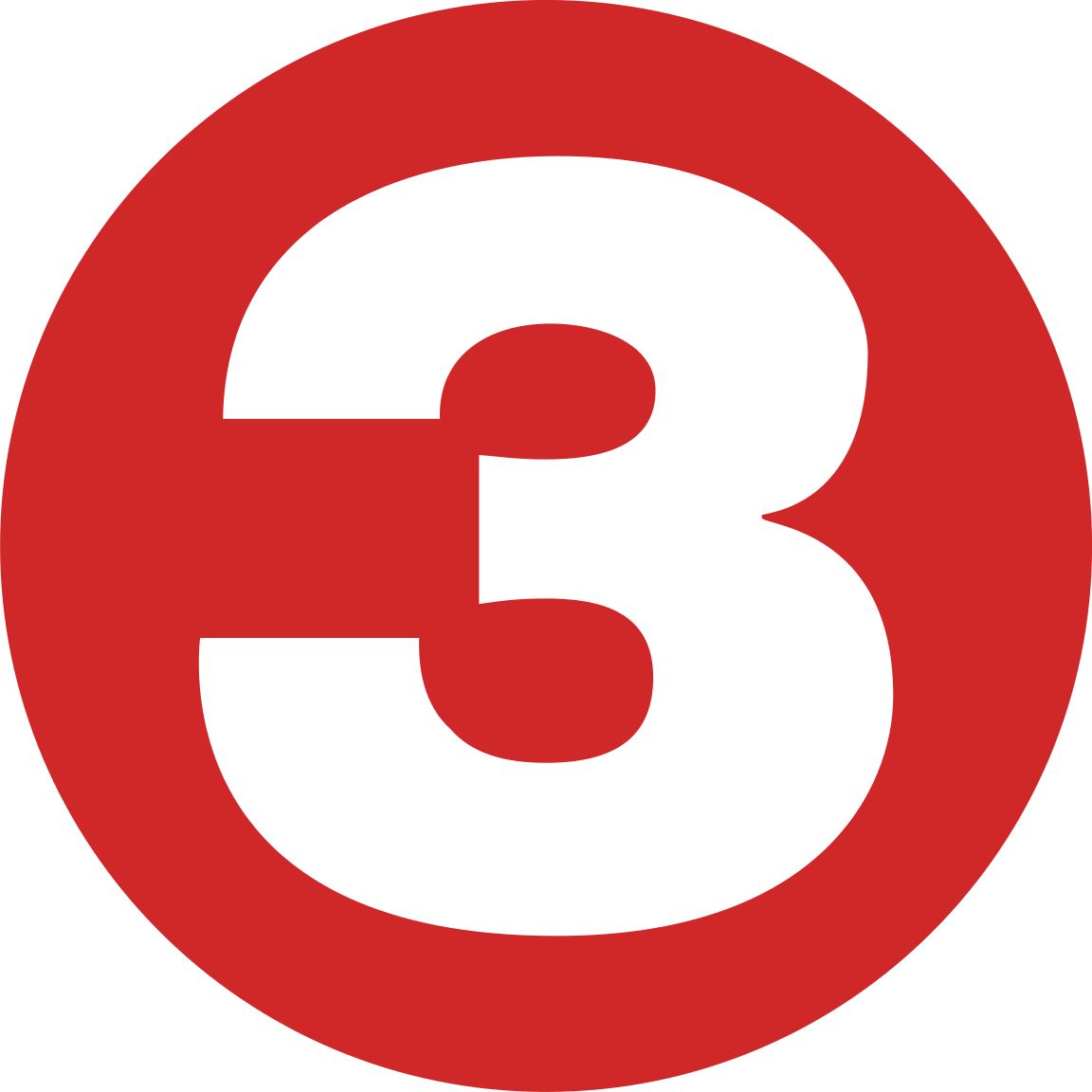
2018–2019

1 December 2019–present

== See also ==
- List of Latvian television channels
- TV3 (Viasat)
