= Vytautas Kernagis =

- Born: Vytautas Kernagis; 19 May 1951
- Origin: Vilnius, Lithuania
- Died: 15 March 2008 (aged 56)
- Genres: Sung poetry, pop, rock, folk
- Occupations: Vocalist, actor, television presenter.
- Years active: 1966–2007

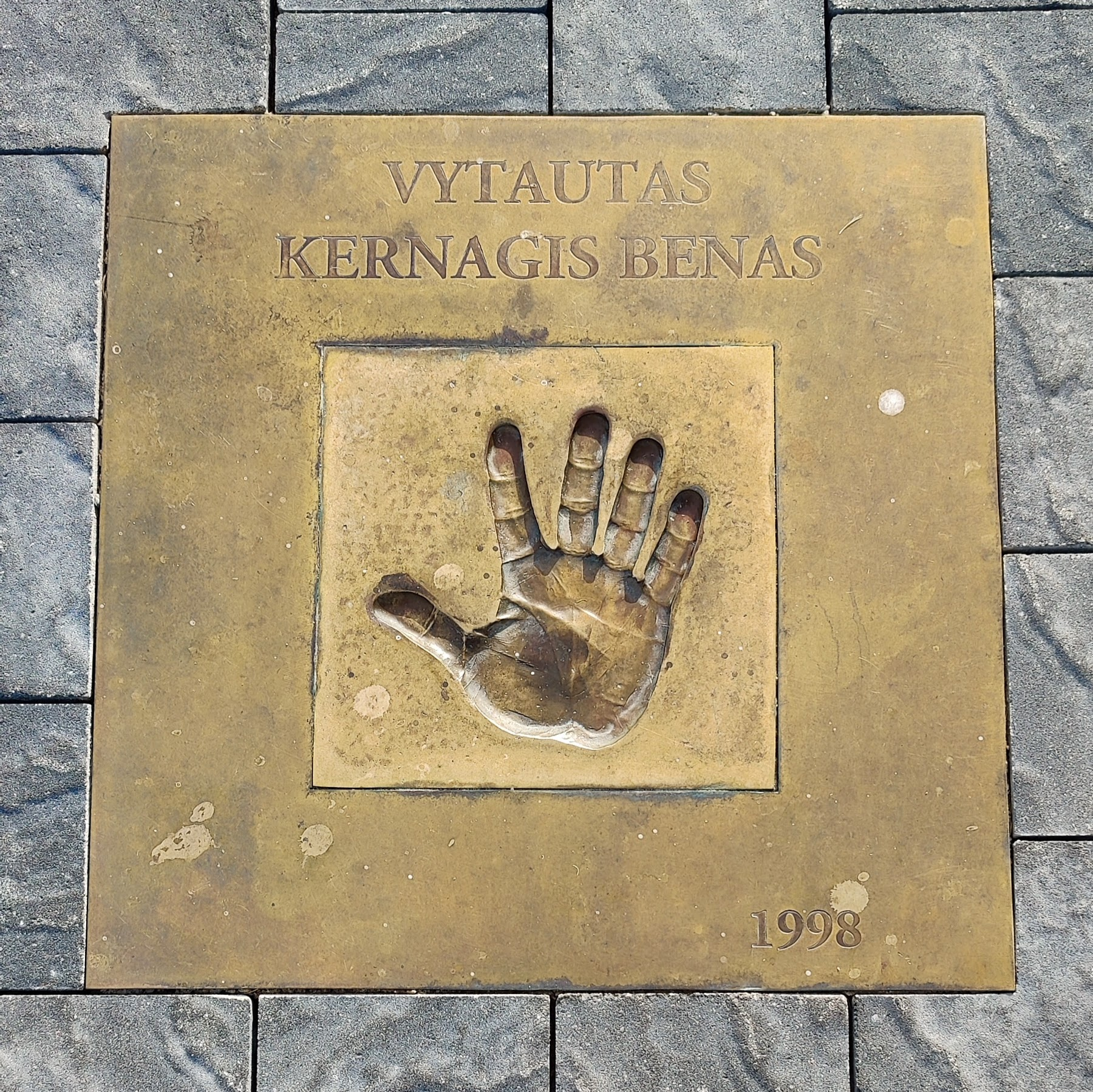
Handprint of Vytautas Kernagis-Benas at the "Walk of Fame" in Nida, Lithuania

Vytautas Kernagis (19 May 1951 – 15 March 2008) was a Lithuanian singer-songwriter ("bard") actor, director, and television announcer. He is considered to be a pioneer of Lithuanian sung poetry.

== Biography ==
Vytautas Kernagis was born to the family of actors Aleksandras Kernagis and Gražina Blynaite-Kernagienė. In 1973 he graduated from the Lithuanian Academy of Music and Theatre. In 1975 he enrolled in correspondence courses on stage directing at State Institute of Theatre Arts in Moscow, from which he graduated in 1980.

He was a member of the pioneering Lithuanian big beat bands Aisčiai (1966–1968) and Rupūs miltai (1969–1972).

Kernagis recorded his first album of sung poetry in 1978. Kernagis also took part in the first Lithuanian rock opera Devil's Bride, first Lithuanian musical Fire Hunt with Beaters (1976), and first Lithuanian musical for a puppet theatre Šokantis ir dainuojantis mergaitės vieversėlis.

Kernagis hosted the 1st season (2007) of Žvaigždžių duetai TV show.

Kernagis suffered from gastric cancer and died March 15, 2008. He was cremated and interred in the Antakalnis Cemetery in Vilnius.

== Filmography ==
=== Acting ===
- lt:Kai aš mažas buvau (When I was little) (1968)
- lt:Maža išpažintis (Little confession) (1971)
- lt:Atsiprašau (I'm sorry) (1982)
- lt:Kažkas atsitiko (Something happened) (1986)
- Anastasija (Anastasia) (2006)

=== Singing ===
- lt:Kam girnos muzika (1972)
- Devil's Bride (1974), the first Soviet musical
- Fire Hunt with Beaters

== Discography ==
- Akustinis (1978 LP album, 1994 CD ir MC, 2006, Vilniaus plokštelių studija)
- Baltojo nieko dainelės (1979, Vilniaus plokštelių studija; 2000, „"Čiki Piki")
- Vytautas Kernagis (1979 LP, Melodia C60-10889-90)
- Kabaretas „Tarp girnų" (1982 small vinyl, 1984 LP, Vilniaus plokštelių studija)
- Vytautas Kernagis Čikagoje (1985, Cassettes studija)
- Dainos teatras:
  - Žvilgsnis nuo kalno (1986, Vilniaus plokštelių studija)
  - Eik savo keliu (1987, Vilniaus plokštelių studija)
  - Povo link... (1989, Vilniaus plokštelių studija)
  - Apie medžioklę (1990, Vilniaus plokštelių studija)
- Keistumas (1991 m., "Lituanus")
- Dainos teatras – Abėcėlė (1993, "Bomba")
- Vaikai vanagai (1994, "Bomba")
- Kabaretas „Tarp girnų“ 1979–1994 (1994 m., "Bomba")
- Baltas paukštis (1998, Vilniaus plokštelių studija)
- Teisingos dainos (2003, "Tigris")
- Dainos teatras (2006)
- Klasika (2007, 5 CD collection):
  - Akustinis
  - Baltojo nieko dainelės
  - Dainos teatras
  - Teisingos dainos

== Awards and remembrance ==
- 1995 – Antanas Šabaniauskas music award
- 2000 – "Bravo" music award
- 2002 – Officer's Cross of the Order of the Lithuanian Grand Duke Gediminas
- 2007 – Lithuanian National Prize for Culture and Arts, for the professionalism in modern creativity and artistry.

A bench sculpture in Nida by Romualdas Kvintas.

A sculpture to his song in Marijampolė.

A sculpture bench with a guitar by Gediminas Avenue, Vilnius.

In 2022 the documentary film Kernagis by director Andrius Lekavičius was released. The film is based, among other materials, on Kernagis's videotaping of his life himself for over 10 years.

== See also ==
- lt:Vytauto Kernagio diskografija
