= Go3 Films =

- current logo
- Country: Lithuanian, Latvian, Estonian.
- Broadcast area: Estonia; Latvia; Lithuania
- Headquarters: Estonia

Programming
- Languages: Estonian, Latvian, Lithuanian
- Picture format: 16:9 (1080i HDTV)

Ownership
- Owner: UAB All Media Lithuania, SIA "All Media Latvia", AS All Media Eesti

History
- Launched: 1 December 2019
- Replaced: TV1000 Premium

Go3 Films is a Baltic movie channel owned by TV3 Group. It launched on 1 December 2019, replacing TV1000 Premium in the region. Broadcasting is done in Estonian, Latvian, Lithuanian and Russian languages.

== History ==
The original TV1000 Premium channel was operational as early as 2008. On 1 November 2009, Elion added Viasat's premium networks, including TV1000 Premium.

On 1 December 2019, TV3 Group renamed the channel TV3 Film as part of a corporate brand realignment. On 8 August 2023, the channel was renamed Go3 Film, the group chose the Go3 brand for its premium television networks.
