= Mass media in Estonia =

Since 1991 Estonia has changed from being a former Soviet republic to a member of the European Union and the European Monetary Union, making a rapid transformation in several fields, including the mass media, which is a vibrant and competitive sector. For many years Estonia has been among the top ten in Reporters Without Borders’ (RSF) Press Freedom Index. In 2017 it was ranked 12th out of 180 countries by RSF while Freedom House assigned Estonia’s press freedom a score of 16/100 (with 1 corresponding to the most free status). A cross-media landscape that embraces traditional media (press, radio and television) as well as the Internet and digital media characterises the contemporary media system in Estonia.

== Historical background ==
The Estonian Soviet Socialist Republic (ESSR) became the first republic within the Soviet sphere of influence to declare state sovereignty from Moscow in 1988. The ESSR was renamed as the Republic of Estonia on May 8, 1990, while the independence of the country was re-established in 1991, when it was also recognized by the Soviet Union. The free and independent journalism that flourished in the 1920s and 1930s has been increasingly repressed after the Soviet occupation. Between 1945 and 1988 newspapers and other media channels operated as propaganda instrument for the communist party. Since 1988 media have played an important role in the national liberation process, while after the independence Estonia witnessed a rapid development of media business, with a proliferation of media actors. This was followed in the 1990s by an increase in competition between corporations until they merged into bigger companies which were often bought by foreign investors. The same tendency continued in the 2000s, which is why several media in Estonia were owned by foreign companies until recently.

== Media landscape ==
Between 1991 and 1994 the Estonian media was characterized by a highly diversified landscape. These were the years of emancipation from both state and political forces for the Estonian mass media, while adapting to market conditions. After mid-1990s the media landscape extended and kept on preserving its diversified nature, although the importance of print media decreased in favour of television and, later, of digital media. Commercial television and radio stations started to proliferate, with an increase of competition in the advertising market. In the same years six national newspapers merged into four, while the inflow of foreign, mainly Nordic, capitals has become more important. Two companies - the Norvegian Shibsted and the Swedish Bonnier - became the principal owners of the four merged newspapers. The control of large sectors of Estonian media market by foreign companies allowed the media to be free from the influence of local oligarchs that, on the other hand, have been very influential in Latvian and Lithuanian media. Today a small group of local private companies owns most newspapers, though some small publications receive aid from regional or municipal governments. Estonia's most popular medium is television, while print media's popularity has been reducing in favour of online media outlets. Television channels and media portals are both in Estonian and in Russian, because of the Russian ethnic minority of the country which accounts for around 320.000 people over a total population of 1.318.000. Still, findings show that Estonia has two radically different information fields: one for Estonian speaking audiences and one for Russian speakers.

=== Print and online media ===
Estonia has four main daily Estonian-language newspapers: Postimees, Eesti Päevaleht, Õhtuleht, and the business daily Äripäev. There are also two major weeklies, Eesti Ekspress and Maaleht that add up to over fifteen local newspapers. In October 2017 the Postimees Group decided to close the print editions of two of the country's last Russian-language national newspapers, Postimees na Russkom Yazyke and Den za Dnyom. This way national daily print media in Russian has disappeared. All major newspapers have gone online in recent years, and several online-only news portals have extensive readership. Estonia has a reputation for the wide use of information technology. According to the BBC in 2016 1.2 million Estonians (around 91% of the population) were using the Internet. According to Statistics Estonia 2009 figures, more than 60% of the population used the Internet for media and cultural consumption, while among young people (up to 30 years), almost 100% use the Internet. The biggest and most visited online news portal is Delfi (web portal), both in Estonian and Russian and it is operated by the Express Grupp. According to a 2016 Eurobarometer survey 56% of people in Estonia uses the websites as their primary source of information.

=== Television and radio ===
The Eesti Rahvusringhääling (Estonian Public Broadcasting, ERR), which emerged from the merger of Estonian Radio and Television in 2007, operates two television stations Eesti Televisioon (ETV), ETV2 and five radio stations. The ERR in autumn 2015 launched ETV+, a Russian-language television station for the Russian-language minority of the country, to provide an alternative to the channels transmitted by the Russian Federation. Kanal2 (owned by the Estonian Eesti Media Group) and TV3 (owned by Swedish Modern Times Group) are the primary national commercial television channels. Another local TV station, Alo TV, operates in Tartu, second largest city in Estonia. In 2008 digital TV platforms, including sister channels of ETV, Kanal2 and TV3, started their activities, including stations in Finnish, Swedish, Russian and Latvian. Television is Estonia's most popular medium. In addition, 44% of Estonians also affirm to use the Internet to watch television. In Estonia there are around 35 private radio stations with programmes broadcast both in Estonian and in Russian and radio is the primary source of information for 51% of Estonians.

== Legal framework ==
Freedom of speech and of the press are guaranteed by the Constitution. The Broadcasting Act, approved in 1994, regulated broadcasting until it was revised according to the EU Audiovisual Media Services Directive, becoming in 2010 the Media Services Act. These laws, together with the 2007 National Broadcasting Law represent the legal framework of media in Estonia. Cultural norms are highly influential in the country and over-regulation is generally avoided. The Estonian Ministry of Culture is responsible of issuing licenses in relation to content, while the Estonian Technical Surveillance Authority issues technical licences. The principle of access to information is outlined in the Constitution, and the Public Information Act establishes mechanisms for access and obliges authorities to assist citizens in the process. According to the Council of Europe’s Convention on Access to Official Documents anyone can request information held by public authorities at no cost. The Public Broadcasting Council (RHN), which supervises the public broadcaster ERR, is composed of 4 media professionals and one representative of each political fraction. Their election is made in Parliament. In 2016, in total, there were 10 members of the Council. Under the law, the Council operates independently.

In 2009 the Estonian Supreme Court decided that online media are deemed responsible for comments posted by their readers. Estonia’s largest website, Delfi, was fined in 2013 for one of these comments and referred the case to the European Court of Human Rights (ECHR). In the Delfi AS v. Estonia (2015) ECtHR 64669/09 case the ECHR ruled that holding Estonian news site Delfi liable for anonymous defamatory comments posted online from its readers, even when they are removed upon request, was not a violation of the Article 10 of the European Convention on Human Rights's guarantees of the freedom of speech.^{[1]} The ruling was unexpected, because of potential conflicts with the "actual knowledge" standard of Article 14 of the EU's E-Commerce Directive.^{[2]} It also raises anxieties as to the extent freedom of expression on the Internet has been compromised. However, the ECHR on 2 February 2016 acknowledged in the case Magyar Tartalomszolgáltatók Egyesülete and Index.hu Zrt v. Hungary that publishers cannot be held liable for comments posted on their sites if they have a notice-and-take-down system operating effectively.

In June 2025, an Estonian journalist named Svetlana Burceva was found guilty of treason and violating international sanctions for contributing to Russian state media publications, and was sentenced to six years in prison.

== Censorship and media freedom ==
In 2017 Estonia was ranked 12th out of 180 countries by RSF^{[1]} while Freedom House assigned Estonia’s press freedom a score of 16/100 (with 1 corresponding to the most free status). Media outlets in Estonia are free to express a variety of positions and they are not generally subject to political interference. However, since 2009 the Courts have started to argue more about the liability of professional content providers in cases where an individual has suffered severely. Journalists could be imprisoned if they refused to reveal their sources in cases of serious crimes. This is considered a factor that could put pressure on independent journalism. The Public Broadcasting Council is considered as impartial and professional, although it has a high presence of government representatives. Violence against journalists is rare, and no major incidents were reported in recent years.

== Media ownership ==
As a result of the country’s 2009 economic crisis, a number of print media stopped publishing, while others dismissed employees and reduced salaries. The crisis also led to significant declines in the advertising market, causing serious financial difficulties to many commercial broadcasters. In autumn 2013, Eesti Meedia (now Postimees Group) and its largest daily newspaper Postimees, were purchased from the Schibsted Group by its Estonian management. The Swedish corporation Bonnier Group was bought out from Ekspress Grupp by Eesti Media in 2001. The small media market in Estonia is concentrated among these companies, with competitors Ekspress Grupp and Eesti Media controlling most of the sector and cross-media ownership also persists.

In addition to Postimees daily, what is now Postimees Group owns the TV channels Kanal 2, Kanal 11 (now Duo 4), Kanal 12 (now Duo 5) and MyHits, the radio stations Kuku, Elmar and Narodnoye Radio, five local newspapers, several internet portals, and the news agency Baltic News Service (BNS), which covers all three Baltic states. In March 2017 Postimees journalists accused daily's owner of meddling with the editorial policy of the news outlet. "To our knowledge, for the first time in the history of Postimees, we are told about what [to write] and how we should write. It is prescribed to us whom to cover and with what degree of criticism," said the department heads of the daily in a memo sent to the publication’s owner, the Estonian entrepreneur Margus Linnamäe, and its general manager, Sven Nuutmann, denouncing an unprecedented pressure on their professional freedom.

On the other hand, Ekspress Grupp publishes Estonia’s largest weekly newspapers Eesti Ekspress and Maaleht, as well as the daily paper Eesti Päevaleht. Ekspress Meedia, which is one of the main subsidiaries of the media group also operates Delfi news portals in Estonia, Latvia and Lithuania. OÜ Hea Lugu (book publishing company), AS SL Õhtuleht (publisher of the daily Õhtuleht), AS Ajakirjade Kirjastus (publisher of several magazines such as Kroonika), are among other subsidiaries of the Ekspress Grupp.
