= List of radio stations in Estonia =

This is a list of radio stations in Estonia. DAB+ broadcasting was started in December 2022 (test) and 1 September 2025 (regular broadcast, official start).

== Radio Groups ==
- ERR
  - Vikerraadio (The station was launched in 1967) (FM and MUX R1 DAB+)
  - Raadio 2 (The station was launched in 1993)
  - Klassikaraadio (The station was launched in 1995)
  - Raadio 4 (Russian language station. The station was launched in 1993) (FM and MUX R1 DAB+)
  - Raadio Tallinn (The station was launched in 2006) With night retranslations BBC World Service and RFI Monde (MUX R1 DAB+ in Estonia, Tallinn 103.5 FM)
  - R2 Altpop (MUX R1 DAB+)
- Duo Media Networks
  - Kuku (The station was launched in 1992) (MUX R1 DAB+ and FM)
  - Elmar (The station was launched in 1997) (FM and MUX R3 DAB+)
  - MyHits (launched in 2016, former name Radio Uuno) (FM and MUX R3 DAB+)
  - 11 thematic stations (MUX R3 DAB+):
    - Elmari tantsuõhtu
    - Elmari Kuld
    - MyHits Dance (before 16 December 2026 also on Narva 93.2 FM, Kohtla-Nõmme 100.4 FM, Viljandi 93.7 FM)
    - MyHits Rock
    - Kidzone
    - Duo
    - Duo Hitmix
    - Duo Softmix (before 3 January 2027 internet only (replaced to Duo Christmas on DAB+))
    - Duo Party
    - Duo Gold
    - Duo Country
- TV3 Group
  - Star FM (FM and MUX R1 DAB+)
  - Power Hit Radio (MUX R1 DAB+ and FM)
  - Star FM Eesti (MUX R1 DAB+ and FM)
  - Star FM+ (before 30 November 2026) (Russian-language station) (Tallinn 107.1 FM, Kohtla-Nõmme 106.9 FM, Narva 89.0 FM) (launched in 2023, former name Radio Volna)
- Sky Media
  - Sky Plus
  - Retro FM (launched in 2005, former name Raadio 3)
  - Rock FM (launched in 2017)
  - Relax FM (launched in 2019)
  - SKY Radio (launched in 1995, in Russian language. Tallinn 98.4 FM, Rakvere 93.8 FM, Kohtla-Järve 102.1 FM, Narva 107.9 FM, Tartu 107.2 FM)
  - Super Radio (in Russian language. Tallinn 90.6 FM, Rakvere 99.2 FM, Kohtla-Järve 89.5 FM, Narva 103.6 FM, Tartu 101.2 FM) (launched in 2023, former name Russkoe Radio)
  - Kiss FM (launched in 2023) (Tallinn 93.2 FM)
  - Legendaarne raadio (launched in 2024/2025) (Tallinn 99.3 FM)
- Big Media
  - XFM (FM and MUX R1 DAB+)
  - BigFM (MUX R1 DAB+ in Estonia, Tallinn 104.9 FM, Haapsalu 100.9 FM, Tartu 107.8 FM)

== Other radio stations ==
- Äripäeva Raadio (MUX R1 DAB+ in Estonia, Tallinn 92.4 FM, Tartu 97.7 FM, Pärnu 91.9 FM)
- Cool FM (from 17 December 2026) (MUX R1 DAB+ in Estonia, Tallinn 90.2 FM)
- Radio Echo (MUX R1 DAB+, de facto successor of Radio "Echo of Moscow", in Russian language)
- Pereraadio
  - Semeinoje Radio Eli (in Russian language, Tartu 1035 AM, Kohtla-Järve 98.2 FM, Narva 95.6 FM)
- Radio Maximum (in Russian language) (Tallinn 100.0 FM, Rakvere 99.6 FM, Kohtla-Jarve 96.3 FM, Narva 100.0 FM and Tartu 94.1 FM)
- Raadio 7 (Tallinn 103.1 FM, Tamsalu 96.1 FM, Pärnu 88.6 FM, Tartu 92.1 FM)
- BBC World Service (in English language, Internet only)
- SSS-Radio (Finnish-language station) (Tallinn 93.7 FM)
- BFBS Radio (in English language) (Camp Tapa 94.9 FM)
  - BFBS Radio 2 (in English language) (Camp Tapa 89.2 FM)
- Raadio Kadi (Hiiumaa 90.1 FM, Muhu 98.6 FM, Kuressaare 90.5 FM)
- Narva FM (from 17 December 2026) (Narva 89.8 FM)
- Ring FM (Tartu 104.7 FM and Võru 101.7 FM)
  - Ruut FM (Valga 96.6 FM)
- Kaguraadio (Põlva 100.7 FM)

== Internet-radio ==
- IDA Radio
- Radio Druzi (in Ukrainian language)
- Happy U
- HitMix Radio
- Rahva raadio
- Soovi raadio
- Hits Radio
- Meie Raadio
- Estonian Party Radio
- Yumor FM (in Russian language)
- Radio Nostalgia (in Russian language)
- ERR
  - R2 Chill
  - R2 Eesti
  - R2 Pop
  - R2 Rap
  - R2 Rock
  - R2 Millennium
  - KlaRa Klassika
  - KlaRa Jazz
  - KlaRa Nostalgia
  - Klara Meditatsioon
  - R4 Retro (in Russian language)
- Duo Media Networks
  - Elmari Ballaadid
  - MyHits K-Pop
  - Duo Christmas (in Christmas time (on 1 November 2026 - 3 January 2027) replace Duo Softmix on DAB+))
- TV3 Group
  - Star FM 80's
  - Star FM 90's
- Sky Media
  - Sky Plus DNB
  - Retro FM Disco
  - Retro FM Eestikas
  - Retro FM Love/Retro FM Jõul
  - Retro FM '00
  - Rock FM Metal
  - Rock FM Classics
  - Relax Cafe
  - Relax Instrumental
  - Relax International
  - Relax Spa
  - Relax Xmas
  - NRJ Eesti
  - Super Rock (in Russian language)
  - Super Retro (in Russian language)
