= List of television channels in Estonia =

This is the list of television channels in Estonia.

== Public channels ==
- ETV (Eesti TV) – news, current affairs, culture, sports and general entertainment.
- ETV2 (Eesti TV2) – general entertainment, sports, news and children's programming.
- ETV+ (Eesti TV+) – Russian language programming.

== Commercial channels ==
- Kanal 2 – news, current affairs and general entertainment.
- Duo Crime – crime series channel. Replacing Sony Channel Estonia since April 1, 2021.
- Duo Drama (former Kanal 11) – general entertainment. Mostly for women.
- Duo Star (former Kanal 12) – general entertainment. Mostly for men.
- Duo Comedy – comedy series channel. Replacing Sony Turbo Estonia since April 1, 2021.
- Kanal 7 – russian-language news, current affairs and general entertainment.
- Kino 7 – russian-language movies channel.
- MyHits – music channel
- Eesti Kanal – retro channel.
- SmartZone – young entertainment channel.
- KidZone Max – children channel. Mostly for older children aged 6-12 years.
- KidZone Mini – children channel. Mostly for children aged 6-12 years.
- FilmZone – movies channel.
- FilmZone Plus – movies channel.
- TV3 – news, current affairs and general entertainment channel.
- TV6 – general entertainment channel. Mostly for men.
- TV3 Gold – retro channel. Archive TV show and series.
- TV3 Life – general entertainment target to the women.
- Go3 Films – movies channel.
- Go3 Sport – sports channel.
- Vantage Music – music channel
- National Geographic – documentaries.
- National Geographic Wild – nature, animal documentaries.
- FX – general entertainment channel.
- FX Life – general entertainment channel.
- Etnotv Eesti – is a 24 hours broadcasting TV channel devoted to promotion of authentic historical traditions, spiritual and material cultural heritage of the nation.
- Inspira – channel for Telia clients.
- Ajaviite TV – channel by elisa.
- Taevas TV7 – Estonian version of heaven TV7.
- Life TV – Christian russian-language channel.
- Orsent TV – Russian-language programming.
- TVN – Russian-language programing.
- Nickelodeon – kids channel.
- Nick Jr. – kids channel.
- Nicktoons – kids channel.
- Discovery Channel – science, reality documentaries.
- Animal Planet – animal documentaries.
- TLC – reality and lifestyle.
- HGTV – reality and lifestyle.
- Investigation Discovery – investigations.
- Travel Channel – reality.
- Food Network – cooking.
- Eurosport 1 – sports.
- Eurosport 2 – sports.
- AMC – movies & series.
- History – history documentaries.
- Extreme Sports – sports.
- Viasat Nature – animal documentaries.
- Viasat Explore – travel documentaries.
- Viasat History – history documentaries
- Viasat Kino – movies.

== Regional channels ==
- Alo TV – music and news channel, Tartu-based.

== Former channels ==
- TV 1 – Commercial channel. News, current affairs, sports and general entertainment. Aired from February 10, 1997 to October 3, 2001, when it shut down after debt issues.
- Kalev Sport – sports channel, a predecessor of TV4.
- TV4 (Kalev Sport) – sports channel, a predecessor of TV14.
- MTV Eesti – music and entertainment channel. (Replaced with MTV Europe)
- Nickelodeon Estonia
- Tallinna TV – owned by Tallinn city government. Aired from January 1, 2011 to September 30, 2019.
- Nõmme TV
- Seitse – Aired until December 31, 2016 when it was replaced with MyHits.
- Sony Channel - Aired until March 31, 2021 when it was replaced with Duo3
- Eesti Kanal Pluss - Aired until June 30, 2021.
- Kanal 7+ – Aired until April 30, 2024 when it was replaced with Duo5 in Latvia and Lithuania.
- Semejka – Aired until April 30, 2024.
- TV3 Plus – Aired until March 10, 2025 when it was replaced with TV3 Gold.
- Eeter TV
- CITV
- First Baltic channel
- Viasat Sport 2
- Viasat Sport 3
- Disney Channel
