= Duo 7 =

Coordinates: 59°25′56.66″N 24°45′37.61″E

- Country: Estonia
- Broadcast area: Estonia
- Headquarters: Tallinn, Estonia

Programming
- Picture format: 1080p HDTV

Ownership
- Owner: Duo Media Networks (Postimees Grupp)
- Sister channels: Kanal 2 Duo 3 Duo 4 Duo 5 Duo 6 Kino 7 MyHits; Eesti Kanal; SmartZone; KidZone Max; KidZone Mini; FilmZone; FilmZone Plus

History
- Launched: 1 July 2021

Links
- Website: duo7.ee

Duo 7 is an Estonian Russian-language TV channel owned by Duo Media Networks, part of the Postimees Group. The channel launched in 2021 as part of a corporate overhaul of Postimees' TV portfolio.

== History ==
Postimees created Duo Media Networks on 1 December 2020 and was beginning to implement the Duo brand in April following the takeover of the Sony channels in the Baltics, creating Duo 3 and Duo 6. In June 2021, the company announced the creation of Duo 7, a new Russian-language channel, starting 1 July. The company planned the channel as an alternative to Russian-made channels in the language as well as a news program using Postimees' Russian team from 30 August. The channel would start in test mode on Apollo TV before the July launch on STV and Elisa, and from 1 September, on Telia. A mix of Russian and Western programs were seen on the channel at launch.

On 4 October 2021, Novosti Rus.Postimees began airing on weekdays, as a series of five hourly updates from 5pm to 9pm at the top of the hour. With the closure of TV3+, which was being replaced by an Estonian version of TV3 Life, Novosti Taalinna, an independently produced Russian-language newscast, moved to the channel. By April 2022, the channel had become a success among the Russophone community, coupled with the launch of a full half-hour 7pm newscast in late March, following the creation of a television news team.

On 27 March 2024, Duo Media announced that the 7pm newscast would be replaced by a daily political program, under the grounds that producing a full news program was expensive, and facing problems due to the lack of government support. The last edition was scheduled for 1 May.
