= Raadio Tartu =

- Estonia
- Frequencies: 69.6 MHz (OIRT); 100.2 MHz (CCIR)

Programming
- Languages: Estonian; French

Ownership
- Owner: AS Tartu Raadio (1991–2000), AS Eesti Meedia (2000–2003)

History
- First air date: September 30, 1991
- Last air date: September 29, 2003

Raadio Tartu was Estonia's first independent radio station after recovering its independence, operational between 1991 and 2003.

Its founder was Vello Lään, whose team included Meelis Michelson and Urmas Tooming, who had previously worked at the local pirate station Sunlight, as well as two other staff who had prior experience there, Hando Sinisalu and Urmas Kolsar. Both the city and county of Tartu financed the station with investments worth 60,000 rubles each.

Broadcasts started on 30 September 1991, its first track being Simply Red's song "Something Got Me Started".

Its studios were located at the main building of the Estonian University of Life Sciences (later the main building of the Baltic Defence College) at Riia Hill. Its transmitter had a 20 km radius through an antenna atop the rooftop of the same building. It delivered its services on 69.6 MHz (OIRT band) and 100,2 MHz (CCIR).

Some time later, its studio moved to the Tartu Song Festival Grounds. A newer, more powerful transmitter was acquired and put atop the Tartu TV Mast, at a height of 175 meters. With it, it now covered one quarter of Estonia's territory, from Paide to Võru and from Lake Peipsi to Võrtsjärv.

Madis Ligi was its director as of autumn 1996, and planned to introduce a new transmitter at Ardu that year and replacing one of the existing transmitters in Tartu with a new one ordered from the US. The goal was to enable continuous listening of the station in the Tartu–Tallinn highway, but did not have plans to become a pan-Estonian station. At the time, the station had sixteen paid employees and fifty people assisted in producing programs. The station broadcast 24 hours a day; longer news bulletins were available from Eesti Raadio relays; at night, the station broadcast Yle's foreign services in German, English and Finnish. Raadiojaam oli eetris 24 tundi ööpäevas. Pikemaid uudistesaateid osteti Eesti Raadiolt, õhtuti läksid eetrisse saksa-, inglis- ja soomekeelsed Yleisradio uudised. Its subsidiary station, VALI-radio, started broadcasting from a transmitter at the Põltsamaa church tower, where it relayed Radio Tartu for a few hours a day.

In autumn 1996, its the station claimed to have an audience of 100,000 listeners during peak time. It was also the second most popular radio station in Estonia after Vikerraadio, with a higher rate of listeners than the state station in its coverage area.

In 1996, AS Tartu Raadio's council president was Vello Lään, while 80% of the company was owned by private businessmen. Andrus Ansip was its largest shareholder; in 1998., he owned 57,4% of AS Tartu Radio through his company AS Luik Invest.

During its existence, numerous names came to prominence thanks to exposure on Raadio Tartu. The following worked or collaborated with the station: Vello Lään, Lembitu Kuuse, Madis Ligi, Janek Luts, Hillar Palamets, Erkki Kõlu, Urmas Kolsar, Alari Kivisaar, Erlend Aav, Rauno Märks, Marko Kiljak, Ervin Hurt, Mike Sun, Cool D, Veiko Värv, Illari Lään, Onu Bella, Thomas Kiilaspää, Sven Sulp, Sten Teppan, Rainer Helgand, Ago Pärtelpoeg, Urmas Aunin, Elektra (Ilomai Küttim), Toomas Puna, Arp Müller, Lauri Varik, Hando Sinisalu, Taimo Kolsar, Peeter Rehemaa, Krister Paris, Kalle Hein, Lauri Hermann, Raul Rooma, Janek Salme, Sven Mällo, Vambola Paavo, Andres Aljaste, Tiit Kambek, Valdo Jahilo, Kätlin Narusk, Margot Mängel, Jaanika Mölder, Tormi Kevvai, Mirko Ojakivi, Jaan Olmaru, Rauno Veri, Üllar Kärt, Andres Must, Anu Sarv, Urmas Loit, Tarmu Kurm, Olle Kask, Peeter Jõgioja, Oliver Helm, Sven Sumberg, Vahur Kollom, Andres Laisk, Anu Haamer, Epp Laugaste, Heleri Leppik, Jaak Madismäe, Kertu Tampere, Kristiina Reidolv, Mart Normet, Olev Ulp, Piret Toomet, Tiina Joosu, Tiiu Kaerma, Toomas Jüriado, Toomas Kelt, Ulla Länts, Angelika Shegedin etc.

In 2000, it was acquired by AS Eesti Meedia. In 2003, Eesti Meedia decided to merge Raadio Tartu with Kuku Raadio. It closed on 29 September 2003, bookending its operations precisely with the song that opened it: "Something Got Me Started".

== Raadio Tartu programs ==
- "Ole terve!" (Vello Lään and Madis Ligi)
- "Pange pange!"
- "Anekdoodiduell" (Erkki Kõlu and Valdo Jahilo)
- "Viis lemmikut" (Ervin Hurt)
- "Singlimäng" (Illari Lään)
- "Faasinihe" (Onu Bella)
- "Silverscreen" (Tiit Kambek, Lauri Kaare, Illari Lään, Valdo Jahilo)
- "Meeste jutud"
- "Miski pole püha"
- "Portreeintervjuu"
- "Postimehe pooltund"
- "Sport"
- “Laula ja hõiska!” (Rauno Märks and Erlend Aav)
