= Digital terrestrial television in Estonia =

Digital terrestrial television in Estonia, was officially launched on 15 December 2006, when the operator Zuum TV launched its pay service on two multiplexes. Transmissions are made with MPEG-4 AVC compression using the DVB-T standard. A DVB-T2 standard-based network (Multiplex 7) has been created for HD-quality TV picture transmission.

In June 2007, Levira and ETV announced that they had agreed to launch an HDTV trial in July 2007.

In November 2007, a third multiplex was launched, covering almost all of the country. This multiplex was to be used by free-to-air services, while the two existing national multiplexes would only carry pay channels. Hence the public channel ETV was transferred to the new multiplex. At this time there are only seven free-to-air channels (ERR channels and four news channels) while others are pay-TV channels, offered by AS Elisa.

As of 1 July 2025, there are 3 high definition and 36 standard definition channels on these multiplexes:

LCN	Channel	Language	MUX
1.	ETV	Estonian	1
2.	ETV2	Estonian	1
3.	Kanal 2	Estonian	6
4.	TV3	Estonian	6
5.	Jupiter (HbbTV service by ERR)	Estonian	1
6.	Digilevi info (HbbTV service by Levira)	Estonian	1
7.	ETV+	Russian, Estonian	1
8.	France 24	English	6
10	TVP World	English	6
11.	FreeDom	Russian	6
12.	Duo 5	Estonian	2
13	TV6	Estonian	2
14.	Duo 4	Estonian	3
15.	Euronews	English	3
16.	Viasat History	English, Russian; Estonian subtilties	6
17.	Euronews	Russian	6
18	FX Life	English, Russian; Estonian subtitles	3
19.	FX	English, Russian; Estonian subtitles	3
20.	Duo 3	Estonian, Russian	2
21.	Filmzone	English, Russian	3
22.	Duo 6	Estonian, Russian	2
23.	RTL	German	6
24.	Eesti Kanal	Estonian	3
25.	Investigation Discovery	English, Russian; Estonian subtitles	3
26.	Discovery Channel	English, Russian	2
27.	National Geographic Channel	English, Russian; Estonian subtitles	3
28.	Animal Planet	English, Russian	2
29.	History	English, Russian; Estonian subtitles	2
31.	Kidzone Max	Estonian, Võro, Russian	2
34	Eurosport 1	English, Russian	2
35	Eurosport 2	English, Russian	3
38.	MyHits	Estonian	3
39.	TLC	English, Russian	3
40.	Travel Channel	English, Russian	6
44.	TV3 Life	Estonian	2
50.	Hustler TV	English	3
201	ETV HD	Estonian	7
202	ETV2 HD	Estonian	7
207	ETV+ HD	Russian, Estonian	7

== See also ==
- Digital television transition
