= Kadastik =

Kadastik is a surname. Notable people with the surname include:

- Mario Kadastik (born 1981), Estonian physicist and politician
- Mart Kadastik (born 1955), Estonian journalist
