= Ripples (TV series) =

- Ondino
- Genre: Animated series
- Created by: ANIMABIT
- Directed by: Fran Bravo; Raimondo Della Calce
- Creative director: Fran Bravo
- Voices of: Village Production; Felicity Duncan; Jo Lee; Dave Kitchen; Stuart Organ
- Theme music composer: Alfredo Vandresi; Bottega del Suono; Village Production
- Country of origin: Italy
- Original languages: English; Italian
- No. of seasons: 2
- No. of episodes: 52

Production
- Executive producers: Lorenzo Doretti; Lucia Bolzoni
- Producers: Animabit; Rai Fiction
- Running time: 10 minutes
- Production companies: Animabit Studio; Rai Fiction

Original release
- Network: Rai 3 KidZone TV; TV2 (Norway); ABC Australia; Al Jazeera
- Release: July 8, 2007 – 2009

Ripples (Italian: Ondino) is an Italian children's animated television series created and produced by Animabit and Rai Fiction. The first series was broadcast on Italian RAI television beginning July 8, 2007. It currently airs on RAI television, KidZone TV and TV2 (Norway), ABC Australia and Al Jazeera.

== Concept ==
Each episode may focus on a particular sea environment or on the main character’s interaction with the world. The protagonist, a little boy called Ripples, is the one who is best able to act on the information he gathers. The pelican Icarus, who is something of a mentor figure for the group, often has the task of instigating a quest in the earlier stages of the episode. The octopus Polly and the hermit crab Jason provide the comic moments.

== Characters ==
Ripples
Ripples is a half human half fish he can survive on land or underwater. He is the main character in the show Ripples. He always solves problems with his friends by thinking hard and coming up with an idea. He has orange hair, black eyes, black eyebrows, peach skin and green and gold pants with a shell on his pants. He wants to be a sailor when he grows up in the episode 'The Magic Amphora' and he said he will get the old fishing boat and make it brand new and he said that he will sail the seven seas.

Jason
Jason is a hermit crab who lives around sandy areas. He is one of Ripples friends. He also helps his friends solve problems throughout their adventures. He has black eyes, black eyebrows, a red-orange body and he has a shell. Throughout their adventures he stands up for his friends and tries to be brave. He said he wanted to be a skater when he grows up in the episode 'The Magic Amphora' when Icarus asked him he said a skater named Jason the lightning flash.

Polly
Polly is an octopus who lives underwater. She is one of Ripples' friends. She always has a smile on her face except for when a problem occurs in her friends way. In the end Polly is always happy for her friends after an adventure. She has black eyes, black eyebrows, a magenta body and she has tentacles. She can make herself into anything. She says she wants to be a rock star when she grows up in the episode 'The Magic Amphora' when Icarus asks her and she said a singer that sings rock star music.

Icarus
Icarus is a pelican who lives on boats and ships. He is one of Ripples' friends. He doesn't hang around his friends instead he stays on top of ships and boats. When his friends need help he always gives them advice. He has black eyes, white eyebrows, white feathers and he has a gold beak.

== Other characters ==
Lucinda
Lucinda is a sea turtle who lives in wet lands and underwater. She is one of Ripples' friends. She gives her friends lifts to other destinations so her friends can solve a variety of problems quicker. She has green eyes, brown eyebrows, green body and she has a brown back shell.

Lillo
Lillo is a snipefish who swims underwater day to night. He is one of Ripples' friends. He hangs out with Ripple and his friends and he plays with them and has much fun. He has three small brothers. His den got pulled away from the storm in the episode "The Rainbow". He has black eyes, a yellow body and he has a mouth tube that can sound like a trumpet.

Dido & Dado
Dido & Dado are sea breams. They both have the same appearance. When Ripples and his friends are solving problems they get attached but in the end they are back to normal. They both have black eyes, grey body and they both have green stripes on themselves. Their den gets dumped in the episode "A Sea Of... Garbage".

== Environments ==
The Sea
For Ripples, Polly and Jason, the sea is their habitat, their home, and a natural playground that offers up one adventure after another. As well as being home to various species of flora and fauna, the sea floor is a magic playground with mysterious rock formations lit by dancing rays of light filtering down through the water from the surface. Seaweed forests, sandbanks and ravines are the haunts of most of Ripples’ friends: fish, squid, oysters, sea urchins, even sharks and whales.

The Fishing Boat
An old, beached fishing vessel is Icarus’ favourite place for resting a while between flights. It offers him a range of "creature comforts": the beam serves as a perfect lookout point from which to observe the horizon, the deck is an excellent spot to curl up for a nap, while the cabin provides shelter from wind and rain. The semi-submerged boat is also a playground for Ripples and his friends, who come and go through the hole-ridden hull and meet all sorts of land and sea creatures in the hold.

The Beach
This is the border zone between three distinct worlds: the underwater world of the fish, the dry land of the marine birds and the evershifting surface of the sea, with its waves and currents. Ripples, who is able to breathe both below and above the sea, is often to be found at the beach, investigating the strange and wonderful objects that are often washed up on the shore by storms and tides: he might even bump into turtles, crabs and other crustaceans.

The Rocks
These are the oases of the sea, the place for a chat with seagulls, with albatrosses and with other such explorers, wanderers and adventurers.

== Episodes - First Series (1-26) ==
1. The Magic Amphora
2. The Missing Pearls
3. The Firefly Lamp
4. Kiko The Dolphin
5. Charlotte The Oyster
6. The Urchinday
7. The Chick
8. The King Of The Seagulls
9. A Sea Of... Garbage
10. The Rainbow
11. Star Little Star
12. Doctor Jason
13. Polly The Babysitter
14. The Little Bird From The Sea
15. Autumn Is Near
16. The Bungling Sardine
17. The Penguin
18. The Two Turtles
19. Happy Birthday Ripples
20. Wild Oscar
21. A Home For Esmeralda
22. Journey Into The Depths
23. A Dolphin Called...Jason
24. United We Stand, Divided We Fall
25. Night Flight
26. The Great Jack

== Episodes - Second Series (27-52) ==
1. The Little Mermaid
2. A Ray Of Flowers
3. Hiccups
4. The Cloud Catchers
5. Lunch Is Served
6. The Flag
7. The Great Current
8. When The Snow Falls
9. Sweet Dreams
10. Return Of Michaelangelo
11. The Eel’s Great Journey
12. The Fizzy Drink
13. The Unbeatable Bumbo
14. A Sea Full Of Stories
15. Best Of Friends
16. The Enchanted Vessel
17. Uncle Hercules
18. The Secret Room
19. The Great Spring Clean
20. In A Jam
21. Jason’s Odyssey
22. Journey To The Centre Of The Earth
23. Mexico And Bluebubbles
24. The Puffin’s Secret
25. A Stroke Of Genius
26. Super Jason

== Voices ==
- Ripples-Felicity Duncan
- Jason-Dave Kitchen
- Polly-Jo Lee
- Icarus-Stuart Organ

== Episodes synopsis (1-26) ==
The Magic Amphora

Ripples and his friends Jason and Polly find a mysterious and magic amphora

The Missing Pearls

Ripples, Polly and Jason offer to help several oysters find their pearls after they mysteriously went missing in the night.

The Firefly Lamp

Jason wakes up and realises his shell is missing. Ripples rushes to the beach to find it, but he finds it difficult to see in the dark luckily he is helped by the firefly Lulu.

Kiko The Dolphin

Kiko the dolphin has always lived in captivity in a water circus. He manages to escape to see the wonders of the sea. He meets Ripples and his friends, who are very curious and ask him details of the journeys he has made.

Charlotte The Oyster

Lillo tells Ripples, Polly and Jason that his little brothers are born. So, the three friends set off for the beach to find presents for the babies.

The Urchin Day

Followed by Polly and Jason, Ripples dives down to find a present for the 'urchinday' of their urchin friend Spillo (Pinprick).

The Chick

Seagull loses one of the five eggs she is brooding, which ends up on the beach and Jason finds it just as its hatching.

The King Of The Seagulls

Ripples, Polly and Jason show Icarus three objects they received from Lucinda. The pelican shows them the Feather of Honour received years back from the King of the Seagulls, but a flurry of wind blows it away.

A Sea Of... Garbage

A large boat is sailing around and spreading garbage everywhere; a can falls near Ripples, Polly and Jason who, joined by Lucinda decide to go to Icarus and ask for his help to put an end to this havoc.

The Rainbow

Ripples, Polly and Jason dive under water during a rain shower and meet Lillo, who tells them to go somewhere else because the vault of his den is about to crumble away.

Star Little Star

Ripples, Polly and Jason wake up in the night and join Icarus in admiring a beautiful sky full of shooting stars.

Doctor Jason

Ripples pricks himself with a thorn as he is playing with Polly and Jason. The three run to the fishing boat, where Dr. Otto, a large octopus, takes the thorn out of Ripples foot.

Polly The Babysitter

Ripples and Jason are busy employing several objects found on the beach as musical instruments.

The Little Bird From Over The Sea

Ripples, Polly and Jason meet a little bird who has just completed a long journey to spend the winter on their beach.

Autumn In Near

On the beach Ripples, Polly and Jason meet Gegè, a poet swallow who charms Polly with his verses.

The Bungling Sardine

Ripples, Polly and Jason try to console Samy, a little sardine who is always bumping into her companions.

The Penguin

Ripples and his friends meet a lost Penguin called Michelangelo.

The Two Turtles

Ripples, Polly and Jason meet Helga, a land turtle who wants to learn to swim.

Happy Birthday

It's Ripples Birthday but nobody seems to want to spend the day with him.

Wild Oscar

Ripples, Polly and Jason meet a bad-tempered hermit crab called Oscar.

A Home For Esmerelda

Sara the seal and young Esmeralda's den is being destroyed by a group of men who are building a harbour.

Journey Into The Depths

Ripples and his best friends find themselves in the deepest darkness, but Flish and Flash help them to back home.

A Dolphin Called Jason

While playing with Polly and Ripples, Jason bangs his head, loses his memory and thinks he is Kiko the dolphin.

United We Stand, Divided We Fall

Ripples and his friends have a competition between the boys and the girls.

Night Flight

Ripples, Polly and Jason get lost in the woods.

The Great Jack

Joe the albatross gives a crab the news of the imminent arrival of a creature called Jack. This causes a round of Chinese whispers and has everyone wondering who and what Jack is.
