= Eesti Raadio =

Former public broadcaster of Estonia

- Type: Public-service sound broadcasting
- Country: Estonia
- Availability: National; international
- Radio stations: Vikerraadio; Raadio 2; Klassikaraadio; Raadio 4; Raadio Tallinn
- Headquarters: Tallinn, Estonia
- Owner: Government of Estonia
- Key people: Margus Allikmaa (Chairman, 2004–2007)
- Launch date: 18 December 1926; 98 years ago (as Raadio Ringhääling)
- Dissolved: 1 June 2007; 17 years ago
- Replaced: Riigi Ringhääling
- Replaced by: ERR

Eesti Raadio (Estonian Radio, ER) was the public service radio broadcaster of Estonia that, at the time of closure, operated five national radio stations. It was closed in 2007 as a result of a merger with Eesti Televisioon (Estonian Television, ETV) to form the Estonian Public Broadcasting service, or Eesti Rahvusringhääling (ERR).

== History ==
It was founded in 1926 as "Radio Broadcasting" (Raadio Ringhääling, RRH), in the same year it launched a radio station of the same name on medium waves and in 1934 it was reorganized into the State Radio Broadcasting (Riigi Ringhääling, RRH).

In 1940, the Radio Committee of the Council of People's Commissars of the ESSR (Radio Committee of the ESSR) renamed the radio channel into ER, becoming the republican time slot within the All Union First Programme, the retransmission of which began through the Riga radio transmitter. In 1941, the ER radio transmitter was confiscated by the German occupation radio station, launching the Landessender Reval radio station through it. In 1944, the radio transmitter was returned to the Radio Committee of the Estonian SSR, and the retransmission of the Comintern radio station in Estonia resumed. In 1953, the Radio Committee of the ESSR was reorganized into the Main Directorate of the Ministry of Culture of the ESSR (Radio Administration of the ESSR).

In 1957, the ESSR Radio Administration was reorganized into the ESSR State Committee for Television and Radio Broadcasting (Eesti NSV Ministrite Nõukogu Riiklik Televisiooni ja Raadio Komitee, or simply ESSR State Radio and Television). On 3 April 1967, the ESSR Gosteleradio launched the later named Vikerraadio ("rainbow").

In 1990, the ESSR State Radio and Television was divided into Eesti Televisioon (Estonian Television, ETV) and Estonian Radio. On 1 January 1993, ER was admitted as a full active member of the European Broadcasting Union (EBU). From the restoration of independence in 1991 to 31 December 1992, it was a member of the International Radio and Television Organisation (OIRT). On 1 May 1993, the radio station "Estonian Radio" was renamed to ER2, whilst Vikerraadio was renamed ER1 and the radio stations ER3 and ER4 were launched. At the start of April 1995, ER3 was renamed Klassikaraadio, ER4 to Raadio 4, ER2 to Raadio 2, and ER1 revived its old name Vikerraadio. Raadio 4, which broadcasts mostly in Russian, was opened in Narva in 1996.

The activities of Eesti Raadio as an independent broadcaster were terminated on 31 May 2007. On 1 June 2007, following a law passed by the Riigikogu on 18 January 2007, Eesti Raadio merged with Eesti Televisioon (ETV) to create Eesti Rahvusringhääling (ERR). The merger of ER and ETV had been discussed since the early 2000s.

== Stations ==
- Vikerraadio – generalist station with programming based on news, magazines and entertainment
- Raadio 2 – a station specializing in pop/underground music and aimed primarily at listeners aged 15–29
- Klassikaraadio – recorded and live classical and folk music, jazz, and cultural programming
- Raadio 4 – programming for linguistic minorities, in particular Estonia's Russian-speaking community
- Raadio Tallinn – news and information for foreign listeners, including elements from ERR Uudised, BBC World Service and Radio France Internationale. The station was launched in May 2006.

== See also ==
- Radio in Estonia
- Mass media in Estonia
- List of radio stations in Estonia
