= Radio in Estonia =

Radio communications in Estonia first began on the 21st of October, 1918, when Special Station for Radio Communications (Estonian: Tallinna Traadita Telegraafijaam) was established by the Estonian Defence Ministry.

In May 1924 the first radio test broadcast was publicly conducted. The radio test programme took place in Haapsalu. To centralize the radio activities, organization "Raadio-Ringhääling" was established on 1 November 1924. On 18 December 1926 the Kopli radio station set up in Tallinn; this denotes the starting of regular radio broadcasting.

In 1940, 90,000 radio apparatus were owned by Estonians.

== Restoration of independence ==
In 2007, Estonian Radio and Estonian Television were merged, and Eesti Rahvusringhääling (Estonian Public Broadcasting, ERR) was established. ERR has five radio stations. There are around 35 private radio stations with programmes broadcast both in Estonian and in Russian, and radio is the primary source of information for 51% of Estonians.
