= Sky Media =

Sky Media may refer to:

- Sky Media, the advertising arms of Sky UK and Sky Ireland
- A former name of Sky (New Zealand)
- Sky Media Group, an Estonian radio station network
