= ETV 2 =

ETV 2 may refer to:

- ETV2, Estonian television channel operated by ERR
- ETV2 (India), Telugu news channel in Andhra Pradesh, India, operated by ETV Network
