= Miss Moon =

French animated children's television series

- Genre: Adventure; Comedy; Fantasy
- Created by: Sébastien Dorsey; Laure Doyonnax
- Voices of: Dorothée Pousséo; Anaïs Delva; Lou Levy; Marc Duquesnoy; Olivier Podesta; Barbara Weber; Sylvie Gentil; Nathalie Homs
- Opening theme: Sung by Anaïs Delva
- Composer: Didier Julia
- Country of origin: France
- Original language: French
- No. of seasons: 1
- No. of episodes: 52

Production
- Executive producer: Didier Julia
- Running time: 11 minutes
- Production company: Safari de Ville

Original release
- Network: TFOU TV
- Release: April 17, 2016 – October 8, 2017

Miss Moon is a French animated children's television series created by Sébastien Dorsey and Laure Doyonnax. The series debuted on TFOU in France on April 17, 2016. The series also aired on OUFtivi in Belgium. The English dub, along with the Hungarian, Polish, Romanian, and Russian dubs, all premiered on Boomerang in Central and Eastern Europe on October 8, 2016.

== Premise ==
Miss Moon is about a magical nanny called Miss Moon, as she takes care of three kids while their parents are at work, along with the problems that come with the job.

== Characters ==
=== Main characters ===
- Miss Moon is the title character, and a magical nanny who takes care of Jules, Lola, and Baby Joe while their parents are at work.
- Lady Pop is the kids' mother, who is an international rockstar.
- Paul is the kids' father, who is a renowned veterinarian.
- Jules is Lola's 8-year-old brother
- Lola is Jules' 13-year-old sister
- Baby Joe is Jules and Lola's 1-year-old brother

== Episodes ==
In total, 52 episodes were produced and planned for broadcast.

=== Series overview ===
Season	Episodes	Originally aired	
Season	Episodes	First released	Last released
1	52	April 17, 2016	October 8, 2017

== Broadcast ==
Brazilian Portuguese and Latin American Spanish dubs premiered on Discovery Kids in Latin America on September 5, 2016. A European Spanish dub premiered on Canal Panda in Spain on July 11, 2016. The series is also broadcast on Kanal 2 in Estonia.
