= Pärnu Postimees =

Estonian newspaper

- Owner: Postimees Group
- Founder: Johan Woldemar Jannsen
- Founded: 1857; 168 years ago
- Language: Estonian
- ISSN: 1406-2917
- OCLC number: 473226655
- Website: parnu.postimees.ee

Pärnu Postimees ('The Pärnu Postman', originally Perno Postimees ehk Näddalileht 'The Pärnu Postman or Weekly Newspaper') is an Estonian regional newspaper published in Pärnu County. First published on 5 June 1857, it is one of the oldest papers in the country, and also a forerunner to the national newspaper Postimees.

== History ==
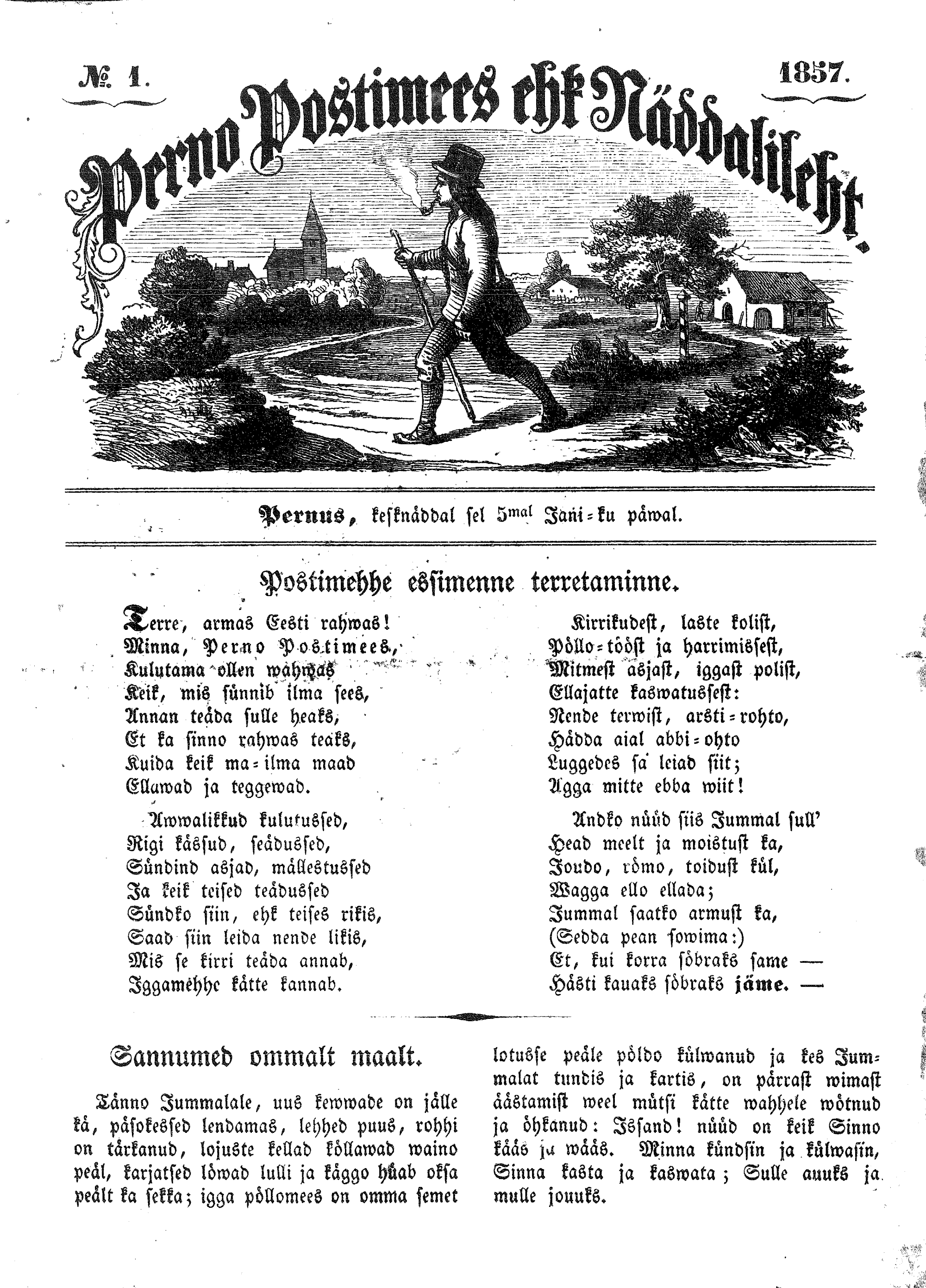
The first issue of Perno Postimees ehk Näddalileht, published on 5 June 1857

The newspaper was first published on 5 June 1857 as Perno Postimees ehk Näddalileht. It was founded by Johann Voldemar Jannsen, who was an architect by profession and has been described as "the father or Estonian journalism".

The paper aimed at encouraging Estonians and at publishing Estonian literary work. In 1863, the paper moved to Dorpat (Tartu) and was renamed Eesti Postimees (meaning 'the Estonian Postman' in English).
