= Tartu Song Festival Grounds =

Open-air venue with a song stage in Tartu, Estonia

Coordinates: 58.3882°N 26.7028°E

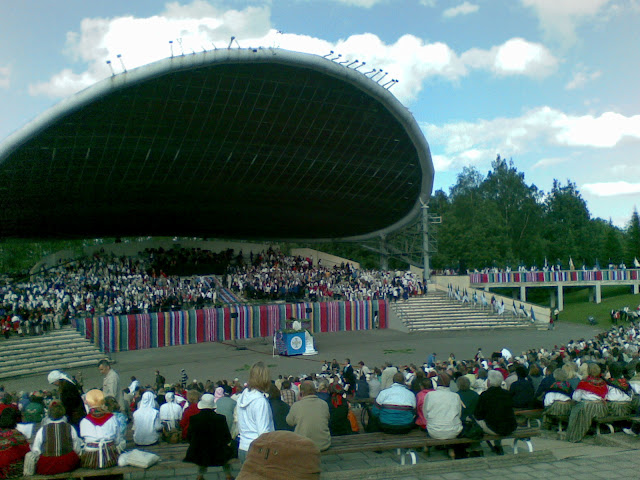
Tartu Song Festival arena on 12 June 2010

Tartu Song Festival Arena (Estonian: Tartu lauluväljak) is an outdoor music venue in Tartu, Estonia. The arena hosts various open-air concerts, festivals and staging performances in summer. The arena's area is about 1 ha.

The arena was re-opened in June 1994. The stage is bleacher-styled and can accommodate a choir of approximately 5,000. The arena's capacity is about 15,000 people and the number of seats are about 10,000. Raadio Tartu moved to its premises in 1995.

== See also ==
- Tallinn Song Festival Grounds
