= SKY Radio =

Russian-language radio station in Estonia

Coordinates: 59°24′13.7″N 24°43′53.19″E

Sky Radio
Estonia
- Broadcast area: Estonia (North)

Ownership
- Owner: Sky Media Group

History
- First air date: 1 August 1995

Links
- Website: www.sky-radio.fm

SKY Radio is a Russian-language radio station in Estonia. Launched in 1995, Sky Radio is the oldest radio station owned by Sky Media Group. Its sister station in Estonian is Sky Plus.
