= Vello Lään =

Estonian sport journalist, writer, and radio broadcaster (1937–2022)

Vello Lään (9 June 1937 – 12 June 2022) was an Estonian sport journalist, writer and radio broadcaster.

== Career ==
In 1960, he graduated from University of Tartu.

From 1960–1975 he was an editor at the newspaper Põllumajanduse Akadeemia. From 1975–1991 he was the head of Estonian Radio's Tartu studio. From 1991–2000 he was principal director of Tartu Radio.

=== Awards ===
- 1999: Kuldmikrofon ('Golden Microphone')
- 2001: Order of the White Star, V class.

== Publications ==
- "Korvpall". Eesti Korvpalliliit, 2002. ISBN 9985-78-830-3
- "38 suvise olümpiaala reeglid". Eesti Entsüklopeediakirjastus, 2004. ISBN 9985-70-161-5
- "Helsingist Helsingis – kergejõustiku maailmameistrivõistlused 1983-2005" [one of the authors]. Eesti Päevalehe Kirjastus, 2005. ISBN 9985-9565-8-3
- "Olümpiamängud. 15 talvise olümpiaala reeglid ja 18 muud talvist ala". Eesti Entsüklopeediakirjastus, 2006. ISBN 9985-70-220-4
