= Järva Teataja =

Regional newspaper from Estonia

- Publisher: Postimees Grupp
- Website: Official website

Järva Teataja is newspaper published in Paide, Järva County by Postimees Grupp.

Newspaper's editor-in-chief is Tiit Reinberg.

== Earlier names ==
Earlier names as follows:

- 1926–1940 Järva Teataja
- 1941 Töötav Järvalane
- 1941–1944 Järva Teataja
- 1944–1945 Uus Järvalane
- 1945–1950 Järvalane
- 1951–1956 Stalinlik tee
- 1956–1989 Võitlev Sõna
- from 1989 Järva Teataja.
