= Delfi AS v. Estonia =

European Court of Human Rights case

Submitted 4 December 2009 Decided 16 June 2015
- Full case name: Delfi AS v. Estonia
- Case: 64569/09
- Chamber: Grand Chamber
- Language of proceedings: English, French

Court composition
- President; Dean Spielmann

Keywords
- Freedom of expression, intermediary liability

Delfi AS v. Estonia (2015) ECtHR 64669/09 is a European Court of Human Rights (ECtHR) case where the Grand Chamber.

== Facts ==
In the case of Delfi AS v. Estonia, the European Court of Human Rights (ECtHR) examined the liability of an online news portal for defamatory comments posted by its readers. The case centered on Delfi, a prominent Estonian news website, which published an article in January 2006 about a ferry company's decision that disrupted planned ice roads. This article attracted 185 comments, approximately 20 of which contained offensive or threatening language directed at the ferry company's owner Vjatšeslav Leedo.

Delfi had implemented measures to moderate user comments, including an automatic filter to delete postings containing certain lewd language and a notice-and-take-down system allowing readers to mark inappropriate comments for removal. Despite these measures, the offensive comments remained online for six weeks before Delfi removed them following a request from the ferry company's owner, who also sought €32,000 in damages.

The Estonian courts held Delfi liable for the defamatory comments, reasoning that the portal, as a commercial news provider, should have exercised greater control over user-generated content. The courts emphasized that Delfi's filtering mechanisms were insufficient to prevent the publication of clearly unlawful hate speech and that the company had a substantial degree of control over the comments published on its platform.

Delfi appealed the decision to the ECtHR, arguing that holding it liable for third-party comments violated its right to freedom of expression under Article 10 of the European Convention on Human Rights. The Grand Chamber of the ECtHR upheld the Estonian courts' decision, concluding that the interference with Delfi's freedom of expression was justified and proportionate. The Court noted that Delfi, as a professional publisher, should have been aware of the potential risks associated with allowing anonymous comments and had the means to prevent harm to third parties.

This case set a significant precedent regarding the responsibilities of online platforms in moderating user-generated content, highlighting the balance between protecting freedom of expression and safeguarding individuals' reputations.

== Significance ==
The ruling was unexpected, because of potential conflicts with the "actual knowledge" standard of Article 14 of the EU's E-Commerce Directive. The ruling is influential in the development of national and European Union law, particularly leading to the Digital Services Act.

Delfi AS was represented by attorneys-at-law Karmen Turk and Villu Otsmann from pan-Baltic law firm Triniti and the government of Estonia by Maris Kuurberg.

The case was followed shortly by Magyar Tartalomszolgáltatók Egyesülete and Index.hu Zrt v. Hungary, which reached a different conclusion based on slightly different facts.

== See also ==
- EU law
- Delfi (web portal)
- List of ECHR cases concerning legal ethics
