= Virumaa Teataja =

Estonian newspaper

- Publisher: Postimees Grupp
- Founded: 1925
- Language: Estonian
- Website: Official website

Virumaa Teataja is newspaper published in Rakvere, Estonia.

== Earlier names ==
- Virumaa Teataja (1925–1940)
- Punane Virumaa (1940–1941)
- Virumaa Teataja (1941–1944)
- Viru Sõna (1944–1950)
- Punane Täht (1950–1988)
- Viru Sõna (1988–1993)
- Virumaa Teataja (1993–)
