= List of ECHR cases concerning legal ethics =

The European Court of Human Rights has delivered many judgements and decisions in cases where special limitations for legal professions were concerned. These include:

== Freedom of speech ==
- Casado Coca v. Spain (No. 15450/89, 1994)
- Schöpfer v. Switzerland (No. 25405/94, 1998)
- Wille v. Liechtenstein
- Lavents v. Latvia
- Pitkevich v. Russia
- Kudeshkina v. Russia
- Hajibeyli and Aliyev v. Azerbaijan (2018) applications. Nos. 6477/08 and 10414/08
- L.P. and Carvalho v. Portugal (2019)
- Baka v. Hungary (2014 and 2016)

== Freedom of association and assembly ==
- Ezelin v. France
- Kiiskinen and Kovalainen v. Finland (No. 26323/95, 1999)
- Grande Oriente d’Italia di Palazzo Giustiniani v. Italy (No. 35972/97, 2001)
- N. F. v. Italy (No. 37119/97, 2001)
- Maestri v. Italy (No. 39748/98, 2004)

== Private life ==
- K. A. and A. D. v. Belgium (No. 42758/98 and 45558/99, 2005)
