= Mart Kadastik =

Estonian journalist

- Born: 24 March 1955 (age 70); Estonia
- Occupations: Executive director and chairman of the board of Eesti Meedia
- Known for: Editor in chief of Edasi

Mart Kadastik (born March 24, 1955) is an Estonian journalist, the editor in chief of Estonia's largest daily Edasi/Postimees 1977–1998, and executive director and chairman of the board of Eesti Meedia since 1998, the media group in Estonia controlling about one third of the national press market.
