= Raadio 4 =

- Estonia
- Broadcast area: Estonia

Programming
- Language: Russian

Ownership
- Owner: Eesti Rahvusringhääling
- Sister stations: Vikerraadio; Klassikaraadio; Raadio 2; Raadio Tallinn

History
- First air date: 1 May 1993; 33 years ago

Links
- Webcast: otse.err.ee/k/raadio4
- Website: r4.err.ee

Raadio 4 is Estonian radio station, owned by Eesti Rahvusringhääling (Estonian Public Broadcasting; formerly Eesti Raadio) and started broadcasting on 1 May 1993. The station caters for the country's Russophone population.

== History ==
Russian-language broadcasts existed before the 1993 reforms, carried by Eesti Raadio IV programme. On 1 May 1993, Raadio 4 began broadcasting in earnest; by October, it had become the second most-listened-to radio station in Tallinn, according to a survey conducted by Baltic Media Facts, attracting 18%; Raadio 2 occupied the top spot at 20%.

At 5:30pm on 3 June 2014, an air conditioner caused a fire at its studios.

Two Raadio 4 reporters, Kirill Krabut and Julia Balit, who were covering at a refugee camp at the Turkish-Syrian border, were misidentified as ISIS agents and taken to the police; at the time, the reporters were at a café. The two spent two hours at the police station and could only communicate with the help of Google Translate and an English teacher.

Since its inception, the station has aired Rozhdestvenskiy Blagovest ("Christmas Joy") over the Christmas and New Year period, ending 7 January. Initially, it only supported children with leukemia, but subsequently broadened its scope to raise funds for children's hospitals across Estonia.

== Today ==
As of 2026 Raadio 4 is broadcast via the Internet on the Eesti Rahvusringhääling (ERR) website, and can be heard around the world. A varied program is broadcast around the clock, including children's programmes.
