= Klassikaraadio =

Estonian radio station for classical music

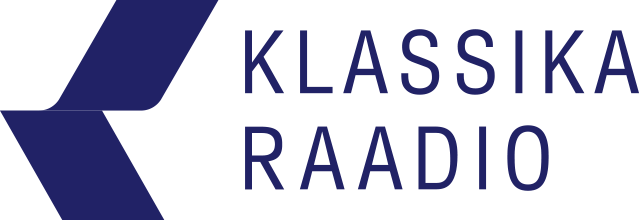
- Estonia

Programming
- Language: Estonian
- Format: Classical music

Ownership
- Owner: Eesti Rahvusringhääling
- Sister stations: Vikerraadio, Raadio 2, Raadio 4, Raadio Tallinn

History
- First air date: April 1, 1995; 31 years ago

Links
- Webcast: otse.err.ee/k/klassikaraadio
- Website: klassikaraadio.err.ee

Klassikaraadio ('Radio of Classics') is an Estonian radio station which is managed by Estonian Public Broadcasting (formerly Estonian Radio). Klassikaraadio is the only radio station in Estonia which regularly transmit classical music. Klassikaraadio started on 1 April 1995.

TNS Emor's survey in 2018 showed that every week about 94.000 people listen to Klassikaraadio.

== Programming ==
Notable programs include Helikaja, Delta, Da capo, Fantaasia and Kontserdisaalis, which broadcasts from live concerts.
