= Raadio Tallinn =

Raadio Taalinn
- Estonia
- Frequency: 103.5 MHz

Programming
- Languages: English; French; Estonian

Ownership
- Owner: Eesti Rahvusringhääling
- Sister stations: Vikerraadio, Raadio 2, Klassikaraadio, Raadio 4

History
- First air date: 1 November 1992; 33 years ago

Links
- Webcast: otse.err.ee/k/raadiotallinn
- Website: raadiotallinn.err.ee

Raadio Tallinn (English: Radio Tallinn) is an Estonian radio station which is managed by Estonian Public Broadcasting. Receivable only in Tallinn, the station mainly relays output produced by the BBC World Service and Radio France Internationale.

== History ==
The station was created as a joint venture between Tno (Raadio KUKU) and Vasa (Viimsi Raadio), alongside the Tallinn municipal government. At its launch on 1 November 1992, it broadcast in Finnish, Russian, and English, on 100.0 MHz, with a hearing area of up to 30 kilometres from the Merivälja Centre, with a range of up to 30 km (19 mi) from the centre of Merivälja.

On 15 May 2006, as the audience of BBC, DW, and RFI programs was "near zero", the station started airing ambient music daily from 9am to 6pm. Plans to turn it into Eesti Raadio's fifth full-fledged network were underway; at the time, it was still technically part of Vikerraadio. It was broadcasting on 103.5 MHz at this time. The station began streaming on ER's website on 3 July 2006.

In February 2007, it was used as a secondary station for ER's carriage of the World Cross Country Ski Championship in Sapporo, Japan.

== Today ==
Today, Raadio Tallinn is broadcast through ERR.ee, Estonia's public broadcaster's website. It features ERR radio news every hour, and BBC and RFI programmes in the evenings. It is accessible from around the world.
