= Raadio 2 =

Estonian radio station

- Estonia
- Broadcast area: Estonia

Programming
- Language: Estonian
- Format: Contemporary hit radio

Ownership
- Owner: Eesti Rahvusringhääling
- Sister stations: Vikerraadio; Klassikaraadio; Raadio 4; Raadio Tallinn

History
- First air date: May 1, 1993; 33 years ago

Links
- Webcast: otse.err.ee/k/raadio2
- Website: r2.err.ee

Raadio 2 is Estonian radio station. It belongs to Estonian Public Broadcasting (formerly Estonian Radio) and started broadcasting on 1 May 1993.

== History ==
In the course of the radio reform, Vikerraadio was merged with the I program (the name remained the I program). A new Estonian Radio station started operating on the frequency of program II - a self-sustaining commercial station aimed at young people, Raadio 2, which was broadcast for the first time from the 10th floor of the new Radio Building on May 1, 1993. The fourth station became the Russian-language Raadio 4, which started at the same time as R2. In 1995, program I became the more modern Vikerradio and the deep culture-oriented Klassikaradio from the III program. Per a ÜE Baltic Media Facts survey held in October 1993, the station was already the most popular in Tallinn alone, attracting 20% of the sampled population.

On 18 June 1997, Raadio 2 started to broadcast its radio programs via the internet.
