= Sky Media Group =

Estonian mass media company

Sky Media Group is an Estonian company that owns and operates four Estonian-language and two Russian-language radio stations in Estonia. The company launched its first radio station, SKY Radio in 1995. Two years later the company launched Estonia's one of the most successful commercial radio station Sky Plus.

== Radio stations ==
=== Estonian-language radio stations ===
- Sky Plus (launched in 1997)
- NRJ Estonia (launched in 1999)
- Retro FM (launched in 2005)
- Rock FM (launched in 2017)

=== Russian-language radio stations ===
- SKY Radio (launched in 1995)
- Super Radio (2024) formerly Russkoye Radio (originally launched in 1998)
