= All About Men =

Compilation album by Various artists
- Released: 2005
- Label: Universal Music Group

All About Men is a CD which is presented by Universal Music and produced by TVB Music Limited. The songs in this CD are all by male actors. This CD was produced in April 2005.

== Songs ==
Number	Name of the song	Singer	Drama	Kind of the song
01	心計	Hacken Lee	Revolving Doors of Vengeance	Opening theme
02	別怪她	Ron Ng	Revolving Doors of Vengeance	Ending theme
03	三角兩面	Kevin Cheng	Food For Life	Ending theme
04	呼叫	Patrick Tang	Megami Tensei	Opening theme
05	領會	Raymond Lam	Lethal Weapons of Love and Passion	Ending theme
06	和你的每一天	Bowie Lam	Healing Hands	Ending theme
07	世上無難事	Frankie Lam	The Herbalist's Manual	Opening theme
08	不死傳說	Eason Chan	Fullmetal Alchemist	Opening theme
09	心花無限	Moses Chan	Love Bond	Opening theme
10	隨時候命	Ekin Cheng	Always Ready	Opening theme
