= Edasi =

Estonian newspaper

- Type: Daily newspaper
- Founded: 1 May 1948
- Ceased publication: 30 December 1990
- Language: Estonian
- Headquarters: Tartu

Edasi (Estonian: Forward) was a newspaper published in Tartu, Estonia. The paper was published with this name between 1948 and 1990.

== History and profile ==
The paper was the successor of Postimees of which the name was changed to Edasi on 1 May 1948 to make the paper more Soviet. It worked, and the paper became a true Soviet publication. Its headquarters was in Tartu. The paper was controlled by the Tartu Communist Party. However, it was one of the Estonian media outlets not used by the Soviet officials to control Estonians.

Edasi was first a local paper, but later it became a national publication. During the period between 1955 and 1979 when Estonia was subject to the mental Sovietization it was one of the publications which contained political humor. At the same time the paper also published travel stories and literary reviews.

On 1 January 1991, Edasi regained its original name, Postimees.
