= Margus Allikmaa =

Estonian theatre leader, cultural figure, and politician

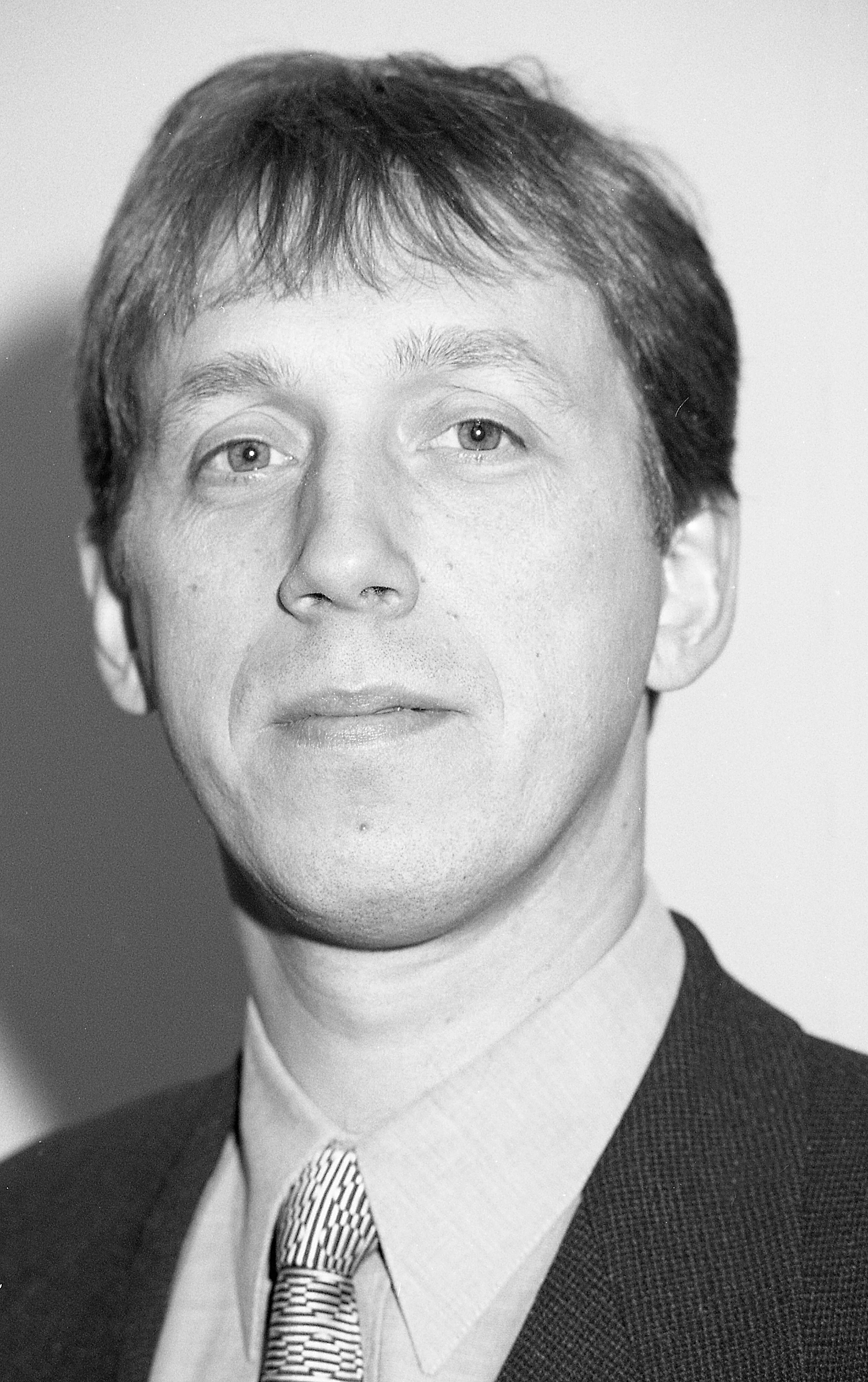
Margus Allikmaa in 1999

Margus Allikmaa (born 28 June 1961, in Paldiski) is an Estonian theatre leader, cultural figure and politician. From 2002 to 2003, he was Minister of Culture.

Allimaa began his career at the Estonian Drama Theatre in 1981, serving in several different positions; from 1991 until 1998 he was the head of the theatre. From 2007 until 2017, Allikmaa was the CEO of Eesti Rahvusringhääling. Since 2018, he has been the director of the Russian Theatre in Tallinn.
