= Alo TV =

Estonian television channel

Coordinates: 58°22′58.39″N 26°41′42.97″E

- Country: Estonia
- Broadcast area: Tartu, Estonia
- Headquarters: Tartu, Estonia

Ownership
- Owner: OÜ Audio-Video

History
- Launched: 27 December 1992

Links
- Website: www.audiovideo.ee

Alo TV is a local interactive television channel in Tartu, Estonia. It includes 24/7 music videos and news. On weekdays it also shows local information. The Alo TV broadcast area was formerly restricted to Tartu and Tartu County, but since 2009 the channel is included in Elion digital TV and Starman cable TV services. The channel is included also Freeview HybridTV list

Alo TV was first broadcast from the Estonian University of Life Sciences dormitory skyscraper. At first, the channel's business idea was to focus on news in text format. There was no editor-in-chief, the managing director was Ülo Veldre. A few test shows were made, until finally the sequel reached Jaan Kalmus. The engineering cooperative ALO (Tõnis Mets), the owner of ALO-TV, was also involved in Tartu Radio (when ERR gave up Tartu Radio in 1993). Tõnis Mets, the creator of ALO TV, received the number one broadcasting license issued for his TV program in newly independent Estonia. Tõnis Mets was a member of the board of ALO TV until February 20, 2007.

Alo TV began operations on December 27, 1992, when the first three-hour live program was broadcast. The first live show was hosted by Tiina Joosu and Hando Sinisalu. The EHHEE-TV team, consisting of Erkki Kõlu, Valdo Jahilo and Janek Luts, also made their broadcast debut in this show lasting over three hours. In addition, Tarmo Jürisson, Tõnis Mets, Enn Räpp, Lembitu Kuuse, etc. participated.

After the closure of Seitse channel on December 31, 2016, Alo TV is the only music channel in Estonia. Unlike channel Seven, Alo TV only shows Estonian creations. Much of the older music was recorded in the old ALO TV studio under the EPA tower. If earlier the coverage area of the TV channel was limited to the immediate surroundings of the city of Tartu, now it is also visible on Elion and Starman Digi-TV. According to the channel's website, Estonians spend 10,000 hours a day watching ALO-TV, and more than 200,000 people tune into ALO-TV every month.

The manager of Alo TV was Jaan Kalmus senior, later Jaan Kalmus Jr.

The authors' association wanted the license of ALO TV to be revoked in 2019, as the channel does not have the association's permission to record and broadcast musical works. However, the Ministry of Culture extended the permit until February 2024.
