= Kanal 2 =

Estonian television channel

Coordinates: 59°25′56.5″N 24°45′36.97″E

- Logo used since 2021
- Country: Estonia
- Broadcast area: Estonia
- Headquarters: Tallinn, Estonia

Programming
- Picture format: 1080i HDTV

Ownership
- Owner: Duo Media Networks (Postimees Group)
- Sister channels: Duo Crime; Duo Drama; Duo Star; Duo Comedy; Kanal 7 Kino 7 MyHits; Eesti Kanal; SmartZone; KidZone Max; KidZone Mini; FilmZone; FilmZone Plus

History
- Launched: 1 October 1993; 33 years ago
- Replaced: Channel 5 (St. Petersburg)

Links
- Website: www.kanal2.ee www.duoplay.ee

Availability

Terrestrial
- Elisa: MUX6, DVB-T, SD (Pay TV)
- Levira: MUX4, HEVC, DVB-T2, Full HD

Kanal 2's former logo from 2009 to 2021.

Kanal 2 is a privately owned Estonian television channel. Its literal name in English is "Channel 2".

== History ==
The channel was established by Ilmar Taska. The channel started broadcasting on 1 October 1993, the first program seen on the new network being the Estonian animated film Kapsapea (Cabbage Head). The channel in its initial phase broadcast on weekends, beginning 17 December that year, week-round broadcasts started.

On 1 August 2017, Kanal 2 left the free-to-air market and became encrypted. The decision was taken on the basis of optimizing its management based around local programming, as well as due to rising advertising costs.

== Programmes ==
The list might not reflect the current lineup of television shows.

=== Estonian ===
- Baar (The Bar)
- Jumal tänatud, et sa siin oled! (Thank God You're Here)
- Kelgukoerad (crime series)
- Kuldvillak (Jeopardy!)
- Kuum hind (The Price Is Right)
- Ma näen su häält (I Can See Your Voice)
- Reporter (daily news program)
- Reporter+ (weekly news program)
- Saladused (Secrets)
- Tantsud tähtedega (Dancing with the Stars)
- Tõehetk (Nada más que la verdad)
- Ühikarotid (Estonian teen drama)

=== Foreign ===
==== Children Shows ====
- 2 Stupid Dogs
- Aaahh!!! Real Monsters
- Alvinnn!!! and the Chipmunks
- Animaniacs
- Biker Mice from Mars
- CatDog
- Catscratch
- Chaplin & Co
- DuckTales
- Miss Moon
- Mr. Bean
- Oggy and the Cockroaches
- Rocko's Modern Life
- Squirrel Boy
- Super 4
- Teletubbies

==== Telenovelas ====
- Acorralada
- Amor Descarado
- Amores de mercado
- Bianca – Wege zum Glück
- Contra viento y marea
- Destilando Amor
- En nombre del amor
- Gata salvaje
- Julia – Wege zum Glück
- Mar de amor
- Milagros
- Olvidarte jamás
- Rosangélica
- Soñadoras
- Victoria

==== Comedy ====
- Andy Richter Controls the Universe
- Desperate Housewives
- Due South
- Friends
- Hang Time
- Inspector Rex
- Joey
- Las Vegas
- Married... with Children
- Men in Trees
- Police Academy: The Series
- Pushing Daisies
- Sabrina, the Teenage Witch
- The Middle
- Two and a Half Men
- Two Guys and a Girl
- Ugly Betty
- What I Like About You

==== Animation ====
- Futurama

==== Soap Operas ====
- Home and Away
- Santa Barbara

==== Drama Series ====
- 90210
- Alcatraz
- Bad Girls
- Brothers & Sisters
- C-16: FBI
- Charmed
- Chicago Fire
- Close to Home
- Cold Case
- Criminal Minds
- Da Vinci's Inquest
- Dexter
- Dirt
- Everwood
- Footballers' Wives
- Footballers' Wives: Extra Time
- Fringe
- Gossip Girl
- Heartbreak High
- Heartland
- Higher Ground
- Highlander: The Series
- Indian Summers
- Invasion
- Judging Amy
- Kyle XY
- Locked Up
- Lost
- MacGyver
- Major Crimes
- McLeod's Daughters
- Medical Investigation
- Medium
- Mile High
- Muhteşem Yüzyıl
- Muhteşem Yüzyıl: Kösem
- NCIS
- NCIS: Los Angeles
- A Nero Wolfe Mystery
- Nip/Tuck
- Nowhere Man
- Person of Interest
- Renegade
- Rizzoli & Isles
- Rome
- Russian Dolls: Sex Trade
- Satisfaction
- Silk Stalkings
- Supernatural
- Terminator: The Sarah Connor Chronicles
- The Blacklist
- The Border
- The Closer
- The Following
- The Immortal
- The Mentalist
- The Mountain
- The O.C.
- The Shield
- To Have & to Hold
- V
- Walker, Texas Ranger
- Without a Trace
- Young Lions

==== Reality ====
- America's Got Talent
- America's Next Top Model
- Forensic Investigators
- I Shouldn't Be Alive
- Ladette to Lady
- My Bare Lady
- Nanny 911
- Pussycat Dolls Present: The Search for the Next Doll
- So You Think You Can Dance
- Supernanny
- The Amazing Race
- The Bachelorette
- The Cut
- The Virtual Revolution
- Zero Hour
