= Postimees =

Estonian newspaper

- "Seisame eesti rahvuse, keele ja kultuuri säilimise eest läbi aegade"
- Type: Daily newspaper
- Owner: Postimees Group
- Founder: Johann Voldemar Jannsen
- Editor-in-chief: Anvar Samost
- Deputy editor: Huko Aaspõllu; Indrek Kiisler; Aivar Reinap; Heili Sibrits
- Opinion editor: Mart Raudsaar
- Photo editor: Erik Prozes
- Founded: 5 June 1857
- Political alignment: Center-right
- Language: Estonian
- Headquarters: Tartu maantee 80, 10112 Tallinn, Estonia
- Circulation: 40,100 (April 2019)
- ISSN: 1406-0981
- Website: www.postimees.ee

Postimees (Estonian for '[The] Postman') is an Estonian daily newspaper established on 5 June 1857, by Johann Voldemar Jannsen. In 1891, it became the first daily newspaper in Estonia. Its current editor-in-chief is Anvar Samost. The paper has approximately 250 employees.

Postimees is currently published five days a week and has the largest circulation and readership in Estonia with 55,000 copies sold during the workweek and over 72,000 on weekends.

Ninety-seven per cent of the paper's circulation is subscription-based with only three per cent sold individually. The weekend edition of Postimees, published on Saturdays, includes several separate sections: AK (Arvamus ja Kultuur), Arter, and a television-guide.

The paper is owned by namesake media company Postimees Group (formerly known as Eesti Meedia), which a company owned by entrepreneur Margus Linnamäe has a full control since 2015.

== History ==
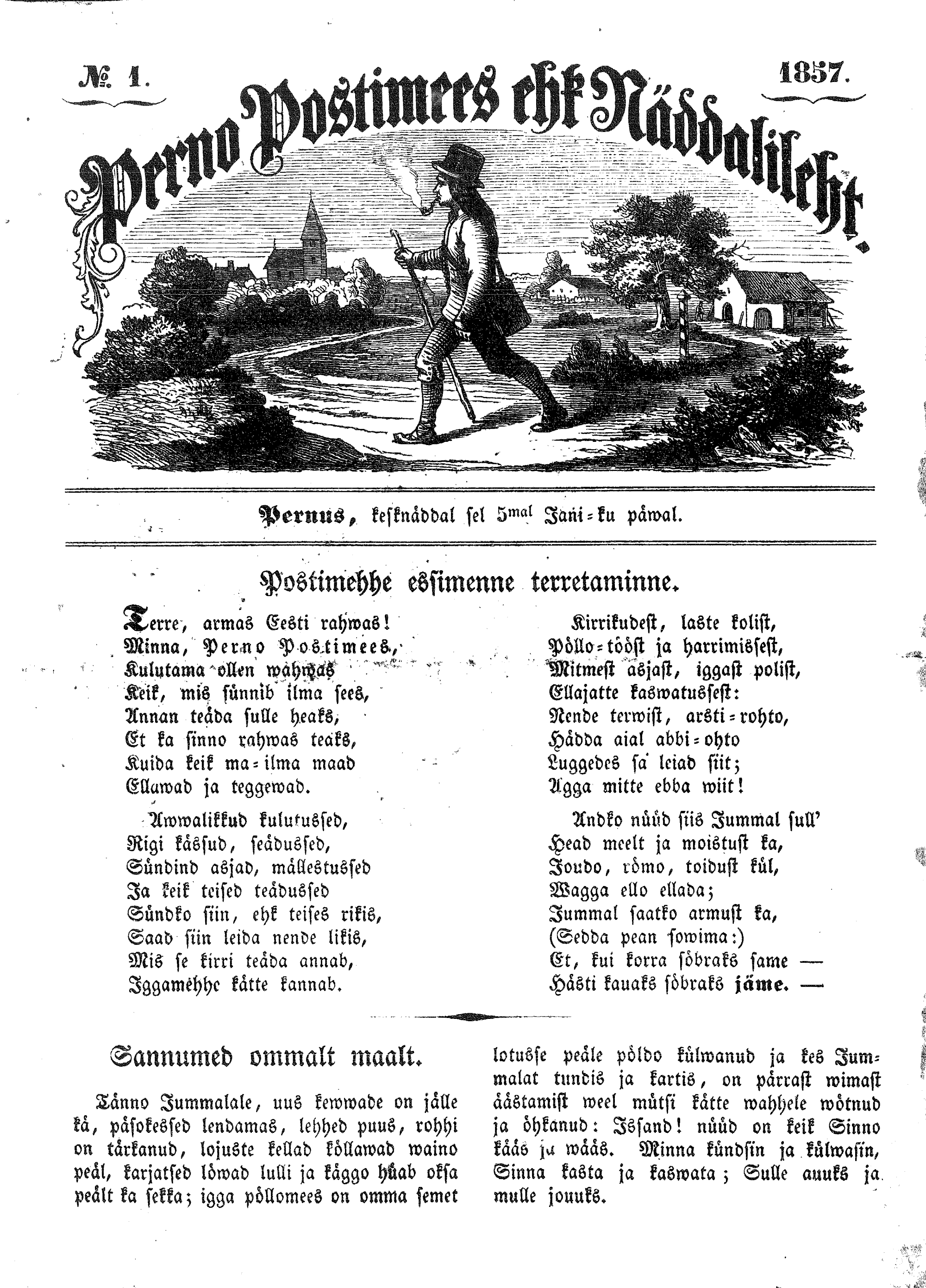
First issue of Postimees (1857)

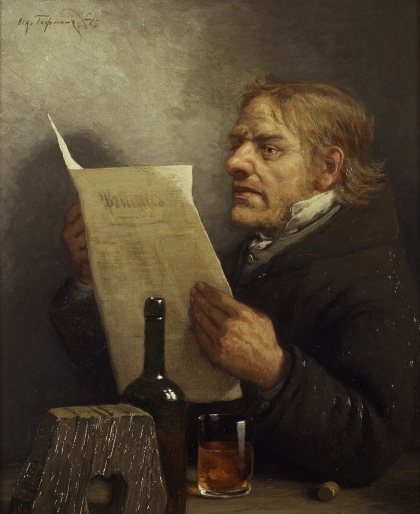
Man reading the newspaper (painting by Oskar Hoffmann, 1902)

Postimees is considered to be the oldest newspaper in Estonia. Perno Postimees ehk Näddalaleht (now Pärnu Postimees), a forerunner to the national Postimees newspaper, was first established as a regional newspaper in Pärnu on 5 June 1857 by Johann Voldemar Jannsen. Karl August Hermann bought the paper in 1886 and began publishing Postimees in Tartu. In 1891 Postimees became Estonia's first daily newspaper. In 1896 the newspaper was bought by Tartu's intellectuals. It was edited by Jaan Tõnisson who brought together many talented cultural figures such as August Kitzberg, Anna Haava and Karl August Hindrey. Tõnisson became a long-time editor of the newspaper in the independent Republic of Estonia. Postimees has played an important role in Estonians' educational and cultural development.

In 1948, during Soviet occupation, the paper was renamed to Edasi (lit. 'Forward'). The paper returned to its original name in 1991.

In 1995, Postimees launched its website, which started as an online version of the print edition. In 2000, the website was revamped and it began publishing online news on a daily basis. It has become one of the most frequently visited news portals in Estonia.

During the 2007 Bronze Soldier of Tallinn controversy, the Postimees website sustained damage in a cyberattack reportedly originating from Russia and, as a result of it, the website became inaccessible from outside Estonia for several days.

In September 2013, Schibsted has agreed to sell the paper's parent company Eesti Meedia which it has owned from 1998, exiting the Baltic market. A group of management headed by Mart Kadastik formed a company which purchased the 50% of Eesti Meedia; the other 50% was bought by a company owned by entrepreneur Margus Linnamäe.

In August 2015, it was announced that Linnamäe's company would acquire Eesti Meedia in full. Kadastik would resign as the chair of the supervisory board of Eesti Meedia, and Linnamäe would take over the position. Toomas Issak left the management boards of both Eesti Meedia and Postimees. Janeck Uibo, who has previously served as marketing director of Postimees, would lead the paper.

In March 2017, Postimees journalists accused daily's owner of meddling with the editorial policy of the news outlet. "To our knowledge, for the first time in the history of Postimees, we are told about what [to write] and how we should write. It is prescribed to us whom to cover and with what degree of criticism," said the department heads of the daily in a memo sent to the publication's owner Margus Linnamäe and its general manager Sven Nuutmann, denouncing an unprecedented pressure on their professional freedom.

== Circulation ==
In the second quarter of 2013, the print edition of Postimees had 211,000 readers. Its average circulation in May 2013 was 54,000. The Russian version has an average daily circulation of 39,000. Tartu Postimees has 57,000 readers daily, and its average circulation is 18,700. Postimees, whether via paper or web, reaches 613,000 readers in a month. 68,000 people follow Postimees by mobile according to a study conducted in March 2013.

== Editions ==
Postimees also owns print editions like Arter, Postimees Extra, Tartu Postimees, and Den za Dnjom in addition to managing several well known online news brands, like Postimees.ee, tartu.postimees.ee, sport.Postimees.ee, Elu24.ee, Naine24.ee, Ilmajaam.ee, Tarbija24.ee, dzd.ee, limon.ee, tallinncity.ee, as well as postimees.ru. Postimees also has 34 special editions in Estonian and 12 in Russian. In March 2022, it also opened a Ukrainian-language news portal.

Since 2005, Russian-language version of the Postimees (Postimees na Russkom Yazyke) is published.
