= Sky Plus =

Estonian radio station

Coordinates: 59°24′13.53″N 24°43′53.89″E

Old logo of Sky Plus

Sky Plus is a commercial radio station in Estonia. The radio station was first launched in 1997 and is owned by Sky Media Group. The parent company Sky Media Group owns multiple branches of radio stations (e.g: Retro FM, Rock FM)

== Purpose ==
In Sky Plus radio, many types of songs are broadcast. The radio station is available across multiple Estonian regions, each having their own frequencies.

The radio station broadcasts a variety of songs 24/7 and has a dedicated webpage where anyone can directly listen to the radio station live with just one click.

== FM Frequencies ==
- Tallinn - 95.4MHz
- Tartu - 95.2MHz
- Rakvere - 101.3MHz
- Haapsalu - 97.6MHz
- Pärnu - 96.8MHz
- Viljandi - 99.7MHz
- Võru - 93.8MHz
- Põltsamaa - 96.5MHz
- Türi - 92.6MHz
- Rapla - 95,1MHz
- Muhu - 99.6MHz
- Kuressaare - 96.3MHz
- Kärdla - 96.9MHz
- Otepää - 99.1MHz
- Narva - 93.6MHz
- Kullamaa - 106.8MHz
- Kiviõli - 103.3MHz

Source: Sky Plus Radio website (bottom of page)
