= Postimees Group =

Company based in Estonia

AS Postimees Grupp
- Postimees Grupp logo
- Trade name: Postimees Grupp
- Industry: Mass media
- Founded: 1991
- Headquarters: Tallinn, Estonia
- Area served: Lithuania, Latvia and Estonia
- Revenue: ▼€29.1 million (2022)
- Website: www.postimeesgrupp.ee

AS Postimees Grupp (also known in English as Postimees Group), formerly known as AS Postimees and AS Eesti Meedia, is an Estonian media holding company headquartered in Tallinn. The company is currently owned by MM Group (an investment company in which entrepreneur Margus Linnamäe has most shares), having acquired the half of the company from Norwegian company Schibsted in 2013 and bought the remaining half in 2015. The group is one of the largest media group in the Baltics. Among the Group's activities are creation of print and online media, production of television and radio, e-commerce.

== History ==
The company was established as AS Postimees in 1991 (the year Estonia restored its independence from Soviet occupation, and daily newspaper Edasi restored its pre-Soviet title Postimees).

Previous logo as Eesti Meedia, from 2017 until 2019

In 1998, the company was renamed AS Eesti Meedia, and Postimees newspaper was spun off as a new subsidiary of Eesti Meedia, the new AS Postimees. The same year, the company was acquired by Norwegian media company Schibsted.

In 2008, Eesti Meedia and Pressinvest formed a joint venture named AS Ühinenud Ajalehed, which would consolidate Eesti Meedia's ownership of regional newspapers into one company. At launch, the new company managed Pärnu Postimees (Pärnu), Sakala (Viljandi), Virumaa Teataja (Ida-Viru), Järva Teataja (Järva) and Valgamaalane (Valga; renamed Lõuna-Eesti Postimees in November 2017). At the time of the establishment, Eesti Meedia owned two thirds of the shares in the new joint venture, and Pressinvest owned one third; up until then, the percentage of ownership differed between regional newspapers, while Pärnu Postimees was fully owned by Eesti Meedia.

=== Under Margus Linnamäe ownership ===
In September 2013, Schibsted has agreed to sell Eesti Meedia, exiting the Baltic market. A group of management consisted of Toomas Issak, Andres Kull ^{[et]}, Meelis Luht and Mart Kadastik formed TAMM Meedia OÜ (in which Kadastik had 58% of shares and the other three had 14% of shares each) and purchased the 50% of the company; the other 50% was bought by a company owned by entrepreneur Margus Linnamäe.

In August 2015, it was announced that the owners of TAMM Meedia would sell their shares in Eesti Meedia to Linnamäe. Kadastik would resign as the chair of the supervisory board of Eesti Meedia, and Linnamäe would take over the position. Issak left the management boards of both Eesti Meedia and Postimees. Sven Nuutmann, who was with Linnamäe's company UP Invest at the time, would become the chair of Eesti Meedia's management board.

At some point in 2015, Eesti Meedia acquired the remaining shares in the regional newspaper publisher Ühinenud Ajalehed. In November 2015, Eesti Meedia announced that it will merge the Postimees company and Ühinenud Ajalehed by the end of the year, forming the earlier incarnation of AS Postimees Grupp as a single subsidiary that handled newspaper businesses.

On 3 April 2017, Eesti Meedia absorbed its seven Estonian domestic subsidiaries into itself. The affected companies were television broadcaster AS Kanal 2, radio broadcasters AS Trio LSL and OÜ Raadio Elmar, Baltic News Service (BNS) companies BNS Group OÜ and BNS Akadeemia OÜ, White Wizard OÜ, and the earlier company that operated Postimees and other domestic newspapers in Estonia. Effective from that date, Eesti Meedia began directly operating the businesses previously associated with these companies. Allepal OÜ, which operated the Estonian classifieds internet portals, was not the part of the merger.

In February 2019, AS Eesti Meedia changed its name to AS Postimees Grupp. Prior to the name change, Linnamäe's company has already set up a company named Media Investments & Holding OÜ earlier in January that year as a new parent company of what would become Postimees Grupp.

In October 2020, it was announced that Linnamäe's company UP Invest OÜ will establish a new company specialised in television business, and transfer Postimees Group's television assets to the new company. The new company, to be headed by Jüri Pihel and Risto Rosimannus (who were in charge of Kids Network Television OÜ, which operated KidZone, SmartZone and FilmZone television channels; Rosimannus is additionally in charge of TV channel distributor Wide Media), would maintain close cooperation with other Postimees Group businesses, including the handling of advertisement sales. The new company, eventually named Duo Media Networks, formally began its operation in 2021, and combines Postimees Group's TV and radio operations, the former Kids Network Television channels, and Sony Pictures Television's former pan-Baltic linear TV channels.

== Assets ==
The company owns the following assets:

- Postimees and its news portals in Estonian, Russian and English. Also newspapers Tartu Postimees, Pärnu Postimees, Sakala, Virumaa Teataja, Järva Teataja, Lõuna-Eesti Postimees and their news portals. Also weekly published Maa Elu and magazine 60+;
- Radio Kuku;
- news agency Baltic News Service;
- publishing house Postimees Kirjastus;
- entertainment portals Elu24 and Russian-language Limon;
- direct mail Target Master;
- online classifieds store Soov.ee;
- online catalog Neti.ee;
- Latvian “TVNET GRUPA” (TVNET (Rus TVNET and TVNET+), Apollo, Spoki.lv, Receptes.lv)
- subsidiary company "Duo Media Networks":
  - media business in Estonia (television (Kanal 2, Duo Drama, Duo Star, Kanal 7, Kino 7, Eesti Kanal, MyHits, Duo Crime, Duo Comedy, Duo One, Filmzone, Filmzone Plus, Smartzone, Kidzone Max, Kidzone Mini), radio (Elmar, MyHits, 11 DAB+ stations (Elmari Tantsuõhtu, Elmari Kuld, MyHits Dance, MyHits Rock, Duo, Duo Hitmix, Duo Party, Duo Gold, Duo Softmix, Duo Country, Kidzone), internet stations (Elmari Ballaadid, MyHits K-Pop, Duo Christmas)), streaming (Duo Play and Pleier) and distribution (Wide Media));
  - television channels in Latvia (Duo 5 (from 1 December 2026 Duo Drama), Filmzone (from 1 December 2026 Duo Star), Kanal 7, Kino 7, MyHits, Duo 3 (from 1 December 2026 Duo Crime), Duo 6 (from 1 December 2026 Duo Comedy), Filmzone Plus (from 1 December 2026 Filmzone), Smartzone, Kidzone Max, Kidzone Mini)
  - television channels in Lithuania (Duo 5 (from 1 December 2026 Duo Drama), Duo Star, Kanal 7, Kino 7, MyHits, Duo 3 (from 1 December 2026 Duo Crime), Duo 6 (from 1 December 2026 Duo Comedy), Filmzone Plus (from 1 December 2026 Filmzone), Smartzone, Kidzone Max, Kidzone Mini)
- Other companies:
  - Mega Meedia Grupp (Digiekraanid, Cream agency)
  - Kroonpress/Kronpak
  - Baltic Media Monitoring Group BMMG:
    - Station BMMG (Estonia)
    - News agency LETA (Latvia)
      - Scanpix (Baltic states)
      - Nozare.lv
    - Mediaskopas (Lithuania)
      - Station.lt

== Criticism and controversy ==
=== Alleged editorial interference under Margus Linnamäe ownership ===
In March 2017, Postimees journalists accused daily's owner of meddling with the editorial policy of the news outlet. "To our knowledge, for the first time in the history of Postimees, we are told about what [to write] and how we should write. It is prescribed to us whom to cover and with what degree of criticism," said the department heads of the daily in a memo sent to the publication's owner Margus Linnamäe and its general manager Sven Nuutmann, denouncing an unprecedented pressure on their professional freedom.

In October 2020, several reporters at Lithuanian news website 15min resigned in protest against planned restructuring of the editorial team which would see several editors including Raimundas Celencevičius, the chief editor of the outlet, removed from their desks. The resigned journalists accused the management of editorial interference. 47 workers at the news portal have founded a new trade union to challenge the management.
