= Duo 5 =

Estonian television channel

Coordinates: 59°25′56.83″N 24°45′38.31″E

Duo Star
- Country: Estonia
- Broadcast area: Estonia; Latvia (since 30 April 2024); Lithuania (since 30 April 2024)
- Headquarters: Tallinn, Estonia

Programming
- Languages: Estonian; Latvian; Lithuanian
- Picture format: 1080i HDTV

Ownership
- Owner: Duo Media Networks (Postimees Grupp)
- Sister channels: Kanal 2 Duo 3 Duo 4 Duo 6 Kanal 7 Kino 7 MyHits; Eesti Kanal; SmartZone; KidZone Max; KidZone Mini; Duo Star; FilmZone

History
- Launched: 8 June 2011 (Estonia); 30 April 2024 (Latvia and Lithuania)
- Replaced: Kanal 7+ (Latvia and Lithuania)
- Former names: Kanal 12(2011-2021), Duo 5 (2021-2026)

Links
- Website: Duo Star Estonia; Duo 5 Baltic

Availability

Terrestrial
- Analogue terrestrial: Not available on Analogue Terrestrial
- Digital terrestrial: Multiplex 2

Duo Star (formerly known as Kanal 12 (literal English translation Channel 12)) and (formerly knows Duo 5) is an Estonian TV channel. It is owned by the Kanal 2 company. Duo 5 is owned by Duo Media Networks.

The channel started broadcasting on 8 June 2011 as Kanal 12, the culmination of a request by parent channel Kanal 2 to start such a channel since 2007. In its launch month, the channel carried two Estonian festivals, the Punk Music Festival and Rabarock.

On 30 April 2024, Duo 5 launched for the rest of the Baltic states including Latvia and Lithuania, replacing the Russian language TV channel Kanal 7+.

On 10 August 2026, Duo 5 was rebranded to Duo Star. And Lithuania feed, FilmZone rebranded to Duo Star too.

== Shows ==
=== Estonian feed ===
Duo 5 shows mainly reality shows and series targeting for male audiences, including:

- Baywatch (Rannavalve)
- Formula Renault 3.5 Series live broadcast
- MacGyver
- Married... with Children (Tuvikesed)
- Walker, Texas Ranger (Walker, Texase korravalvur)
- WWE Raw
- WWE Smackdown
- Rude Tube (Klikitähed)
- Dudesons (Duudsonid)
- Most Shocking (20 kõige shokeerivamat)
- Most Daring (Hulljulged)
- Extreme Fishing with Robson Green (Ekstreemkalapüük Robson Greeniga)
- Jail (Vangla)
- The Hungry Sailors (Näljased meremehed)
- Sports Gone Wild (Pöörased spordiklipid)
- Travel Sick (Kreisid reisid)
- All About Men (Kogu tõde meestest)
- Piers Morgan On... (Piers Morgani luksusreisid)
- Conan (talk show)
- Kommissar Rex
- Cops (Võmmid)
- SEAL Team
- Magnum, P.I. (Eradetektiiv Magnum)

=== Latvian & Lithuanian feeds ===
Since 30 April 2024, Duo 5 joined its broadcasting lineup for the rest of the Baltics including Latvia and Lithuania. The Latvian and Lithuanian feeds shows mainly true crime documentary TV series, including:

Duo 5 Latvia & Lithuania feed programming lineup
Original title	Latvian title	Lithuanian title
Casey Anthony: An American Murder Mystery	Keisijs Antonijs: Amerikāņu slepkavību mistērija	Casey Anthony: amerikietiškos žmogžudystės paslaptis
A Crime to Remember	Noziegums kuru atcerēties	Įsimintinas nusikaltimas
Disappeared	Pazudis	Dingo be žinios
Mansions & Murders	Savrupmājas un slepkavības	Rūmai ir žmogžudystės
Naked Attraction	Kailā pievilcība	Nuogas potraukis
Nightmare Next Door	Šausmas kaimiņos	Košmaras kaimynystėje
Welcome to Murdertown	Laipni lūgti slepkavību pilsētā	Sveiki atvykę į Žudikų miestą
