= Vikerraadio =

Estonian radio station

- Estonia
- Broadcast area: Estonia

Programming
- Language: Estonian

Ownership
- Owner: Eesti Rahvusringhääling
- Sister stations: Raadio 2, Klassikaraadio, Raadio 4, Raadio Tallinn

History
- First air date: April 3, 1967; 59 years ago

Links
- Webcast: otse.err.ee/k/vikerraadio
- Website: vikerraadio.err.ee

Vikerraadio ("Rainbow Radio") is an Estonian national radio channel of Eesti Rahvusringhääling (formerly Eesti Raadio). It began broadcasting on April 3, 1967. Ingrid Peek has been the editor-in-chief since August 7, 2017.

According to the Kantar Emor radio survey, as of 2022, Vikerraadio was the most listened-to radio station in Estonia by day, week and month. 122,000 listeners listened to Vikerradio per day and 230,000 listeners per week.

== History ==
Vikerraadio started broadcasting on 3 April 1967. It was a music-based service; in addition, it had three five-minute news bulletins and three ten-minute spoken word programs. Some programs moved from Eesti Raadio I to the new service.

Prior to the 1993 ER reforms, it was Eesti Raadio's second channel, officially known as Eesti Raadio II, but known de facto as Vikerraadio. The first edition of its flagship current affairs program Vikerkaja (Rainbow Echo) went live on 23 September 1968.

== Frequencies ==
- Kärdla 91.2 MHz
- Kuressaare 105.6 MHz
- Orissaare 105.9 MHz
- Sõrve Peninsula 92.1 MHz
- Ruhnu 96.4 MHz
- Haapsalu 105.3 MHz
- Dirhami 91.7 MHz
- Tallinn 104.1 MHz
- Rakvere 106.0 MHz
- Ida-Viru County 105.4 MHz
- Narva 104.7 MHz
- Sillamäe 92.3 MHz
- Rapla 95.7 MHz
- Pärnu 104.8 MHz
- Viljandi 107.0 MHz
- Tartu 106.7 MHz
- Tartu County, Põlva County, Valga County and Võru County 71.66 and 106.1 MHz
- Järva County, Jõgeva County and Lääne-Viru County 105.1 MHz
