= Eesti Rahvusringhääling =

Public broadcaster of Estonia

Coordinates: 59°26′3.32″N 24°46′17.09″E

Eesti Rahvusringhääling (ERR)
- Type: television; radio; web portal
- Country: Estonia
- Founded: 1 June 2007
- Headquarters: Tallinn
- Owner: Government of Estonia
- Key people: Sulev Valner (Chairman of the Broadcasting Council); Erik Roose (Chairman of the Board of Eesti Rahvusringhääling)
- Radio: Vikerraadio; Raadio 2; Klassikaraadio; Raadio 4; Raadio Tallinn
- Television: ETV; ETV2; ETV+
- Digital: Uudised; Sport; Kultuur; Novaator; Jupiter
- Affiliation: European Broadcasting Union
- Webcast: Jupiter
- Official website: Official website
- Language: Estonian, Russian
- Replaced: Eesti Televisioon (ETV); Eesti Raadio (ER)

Eesti Rahvusringhääling (ERR) lit. 'Estonian Public Broadcasting' is a publicly funded and owned radio and television organisation created in Estonia on 1 June 2007 to take over the functions of the formerly separate Eesti Raadio (ER) (Estonian Radio) and Eesti Televisioon (ETV) (Estonian Television), under the terms of the Estonian National Broadcasting Act. The first chair of ERR was Margus Allikmaa, the former chair of Eesti Raadio. The current CEO is Erik Roose.

The ERR media family consists of the following news portals and formats: television channels (ETV, ETV2, ETV+), radio stations (Vikerraadio, Raadio 2, Klassikaraadio, Raadio 4, Raadio Tallinn), news portals (Uudised, Sport, Kultuur, Novaator) and streaming services (Jupiter and Lasteekraan).

== History ==
While the organizational structure was formalized in 2007, the roots of public broadcasting in Estonia extend back to 18 December 1926, when regular radio transmissions first commenced. Television services followed on 19 July 1955. Regular radio broadcasting in Estonia began on 18 December 1926. The Eesti Rahvusringhääling (ERR), as it is known today, was established on 1 June 2007 following the merger of Eesti Raadio and Eesti Televisioon. This consolidation was mandated by the Estonian National Broadcasting Act, which aimed to create an integrated public service media organization. Preparations for the merger of Estonian Radio (ER) and Estonian Television (ETV) began as early as the early 2000s. In 2006, the Estonian government approved the creation of Eesti Rahvusringhääling as the legal successor to ETV and ER.

The Estonian National Broadcasting Act was passed on 18 January 2007; of the 78 members of the Riigikogu present, 76 voted in favor, 1 against, and 1 abstained. The Act, which was passed by the Estonian Parliament on 18 January 2007, also appointed Eesti Ringhäälingunõukogu (RHN) (the Estonian Broadcasting Council) to act as the regulatory body for ERR's five national radio channels and single television station.

From 2007, when ERR was created, Eesti Raadio ceased to exist as a separate institution. Eesti Raadio was a public broadcasting institution. Eesti Raadio produced five radio programs: Vikerraadio, Raadio 2, Klassikaraadio, Raadio 4 (Russian-language), and Raadio Tallinn (multilingual).

On 19 September 2014, the Estonian government approved the creation of a dedicated Russian-language TV channel as within the ERR network. It was designed as a Russian-language television channel for Estonia's minority Russian-speaking communities. The channel ETV+ was launched in late September 2015.

== Management ==
The Broadcasting Council is the highest governing body of ERR. The Council plans ERR's activities, organizes ERR's management, and exercises supervision over the board's activities. Once a year, it submits a written and oral report on its activities to the Riigikogu Cultural Committee. From proposals submitted by the Cultural Committee, the Riigikogu appoints one representative from each faction of the Riigikogu until the end of the term of the current Riigikogu, and four experts from among recognized experts in the field of broadcasting, whose term lasts for five years. Upon the end of the term of the Riigikogu, the members of the Council who are members of the Riigikogu remain on the Council until the decision to appoint the members of the new Riigikogu to the Council enters into force.

== Buildings and location ==
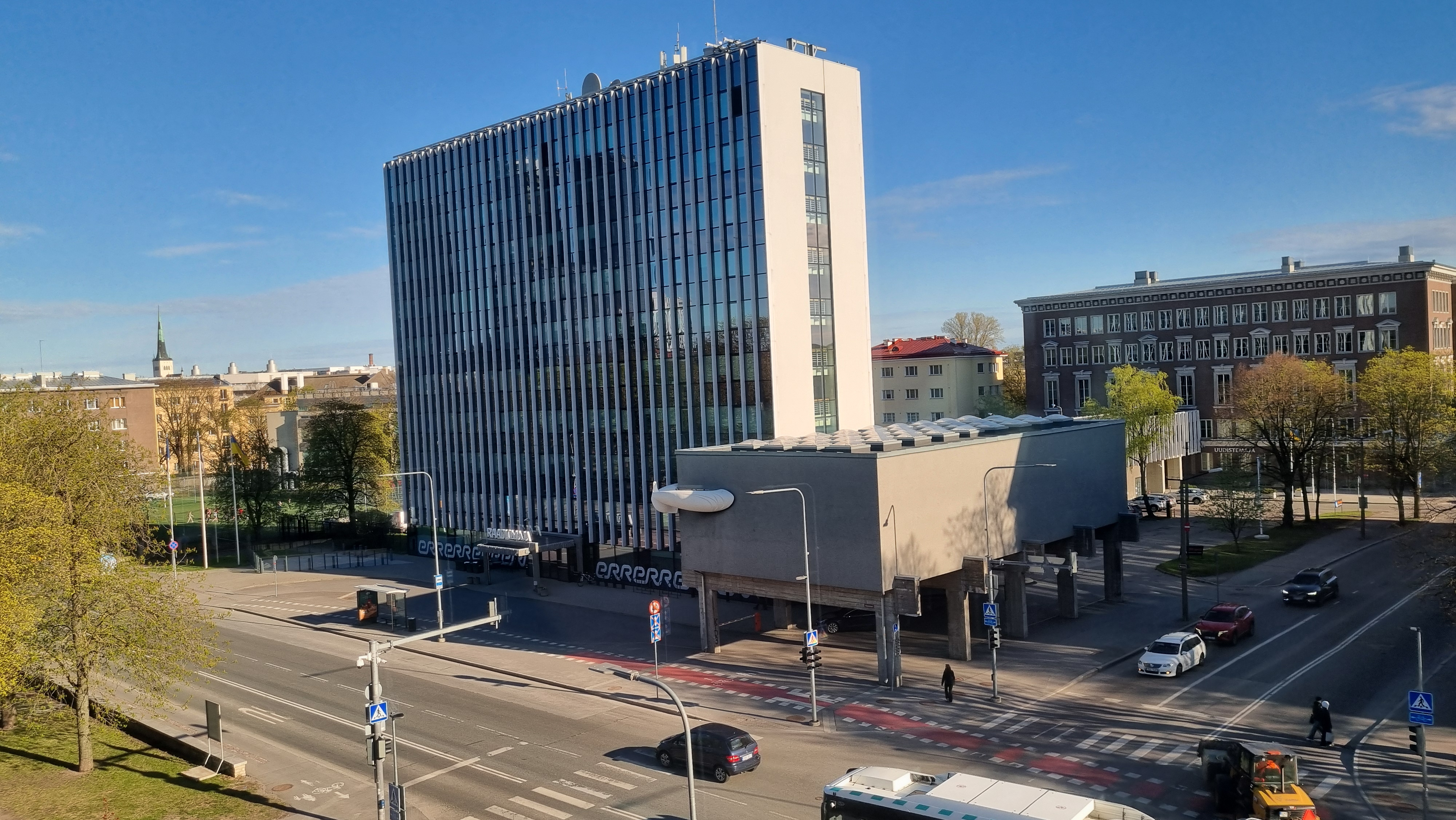
Gonsiori 21, Eesti Raadio building

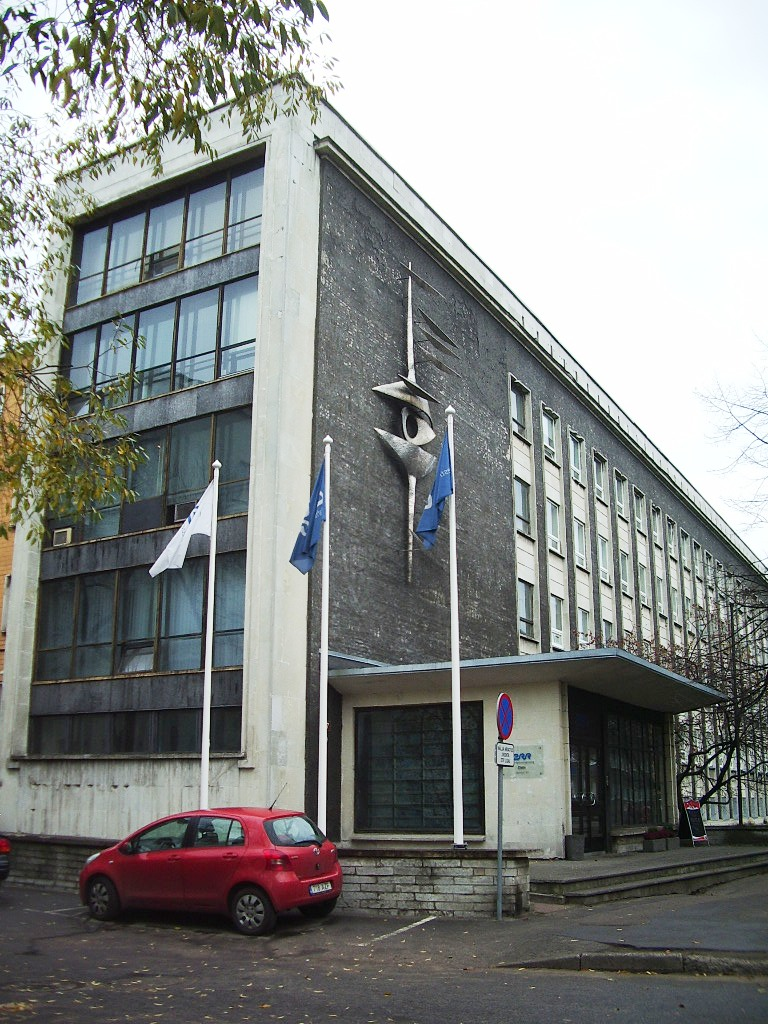
Gonsiori 27, Estonian Television building

ERR is located across four buildings, connected in pairs. The buildings of Estonian Television and Estonian Radio are located close to each other in Tallinn's city center at addresses Gonsiori 21 and 27, Friedrich Reinhold Kreutzwaldi 14, and Faehlmanni 12.

ERR intended to build a new building on a 24,000-square-meter plot in Järve at Tuisu tänav 21, but economic difficulties halted the project. The building's architectural competition was won by the Danish architectural firm Nobel Arkitekter A/S, led by architect Erik Nobel. The project was named "Ring-Hääl-Hing". After abandoning the construction of the new building, the new radio house at Gonsiori 21 underwent major renovations from 2013 to 2014.

The ERR newsroom was moved on 12 February 2017 to the old radio house (at Kreutzwaldi 14). Shortly before that, the ERR radio editorial offices were concentrated in the renovated radio house at Gonsiori 21.

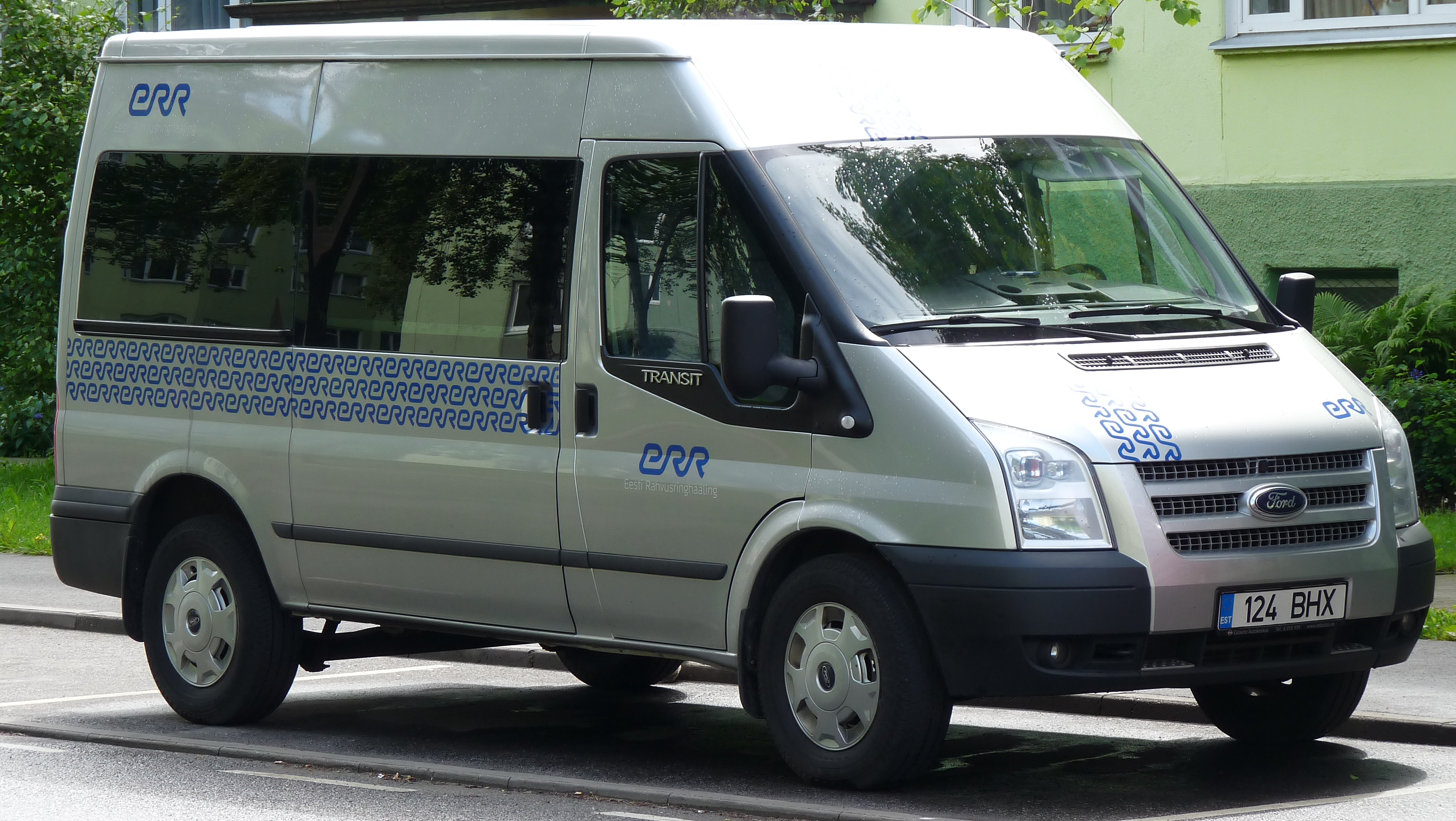
ERR duty vehicle

In April 2019, ERR announced that Kadarik Tüür Arhitektid had won the design competition for the new television house, expected to be completed in 2023. That same month, 15 months of design work began. ERR had plans to sell the buildings at Faehlmann 12, Faehlmann 10, and Gonsiori 27 in 2022 or 2023 due to depreciation. There is a decorative eye on the wall of the television house on the Gonsiori street side. Construction of the new television house began in 2024 by Nordecon, and it is planned to be completed in 2027

== Funding ==
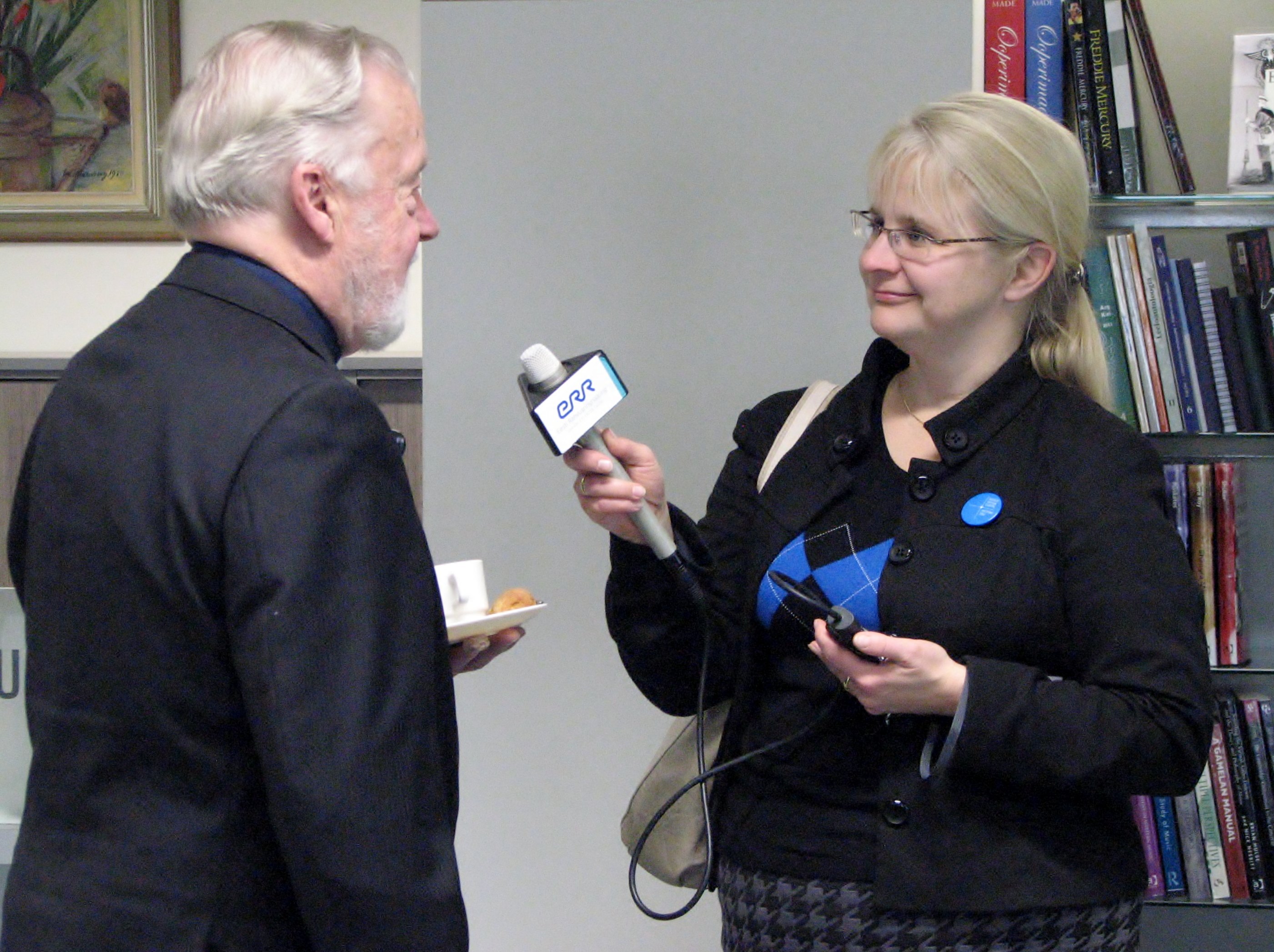
Reporter Kai Vare interviews Vello Salo at the presentation of the digital collection of notes from the National Library of Estonia song festivals

ERR's 2011 budget revenues were 28,053,211 euros, of which 25,328,314 euros came from the state budget. ERR's 2011 budget expenditures were 27,090,390 euros. In addition to revenues received from the state budget, the Broadcasting organization has other revenues in relatively smaller amounts, including self-generated revenues and earmarked allocations. Self-generated revenues amount to 1,694,488 euros to the budget. Categories of self-generated revenues shown in the budget include rent and other building revenues, services, sale of own products, and licensing and sale of rights. The largest source of self-generated revenue is services (1,086,266 euros). Earmarked allocations contribute 1,022,739 euros to the budget. The largest category of earmarked allocations is targeted project grants (734,376 euros).

ERR receives a state grant to fund the operation of its five national radio channels and three TV channels. ERR participates in a number of projects within the European Broadcasting Union, of which it is a full member, notably in musical exchanges and concert series. In addition, ERR's Radio Drama Department has won international recognition at events organised by the EBU.

A portion of the Broadcasting organization's self-generated revenues comes from the budgets of other state budget institutions. The introduction of a television tax (also called a licensing fee) has been repeatedly considered for financing the Broadcasting organization.

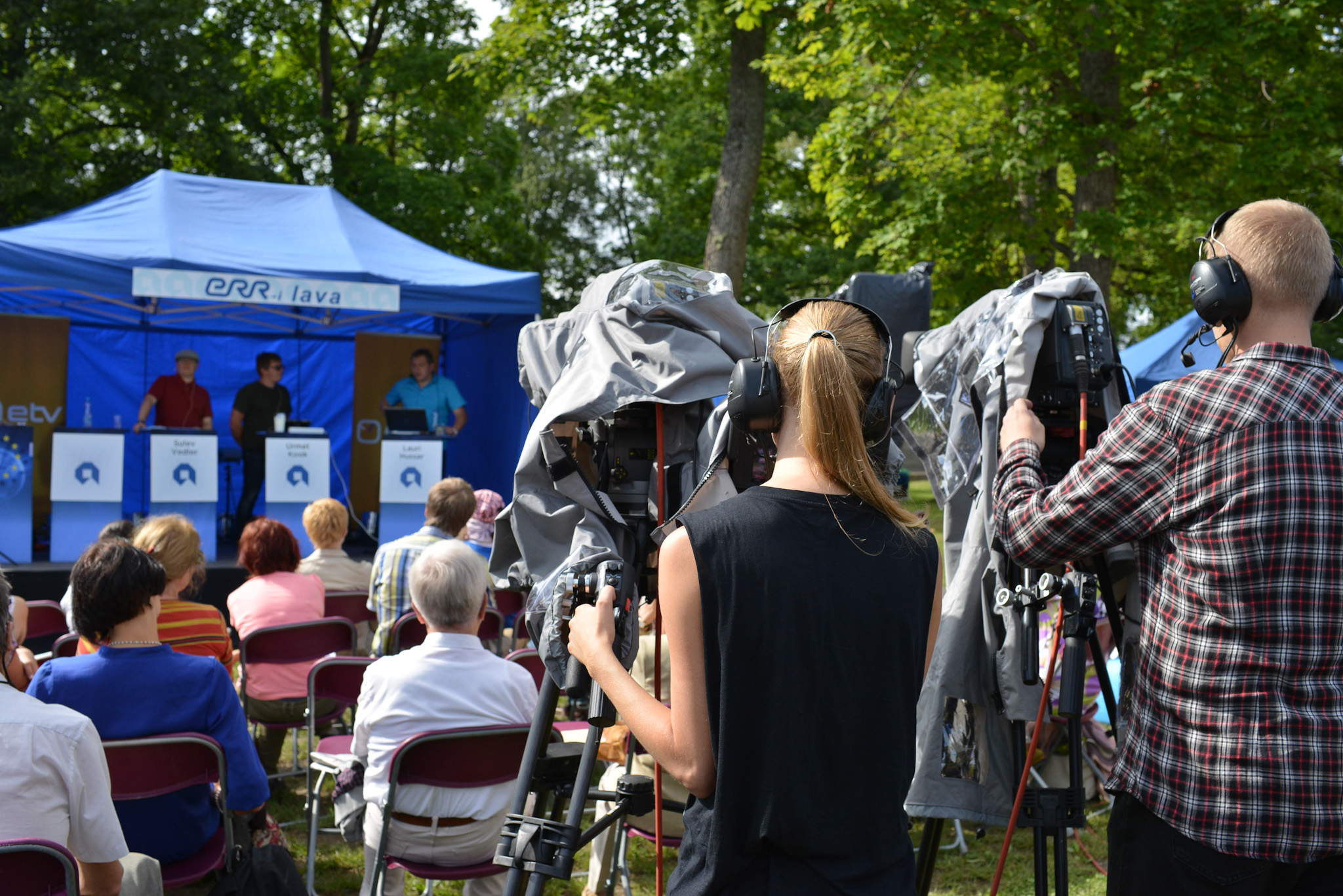
ERR stage at the 2014 Opinion Festival

=== Television ===
ERR operates three national television channels. ETV is the primary general-interest channel. It also has ETV2, which focuses on programming for children, sports, and cultural content, including films and drama series. Additionally, ERR broadcasts ETV+, a channel dedicated to serving Estonia's Russian-speaking minority.

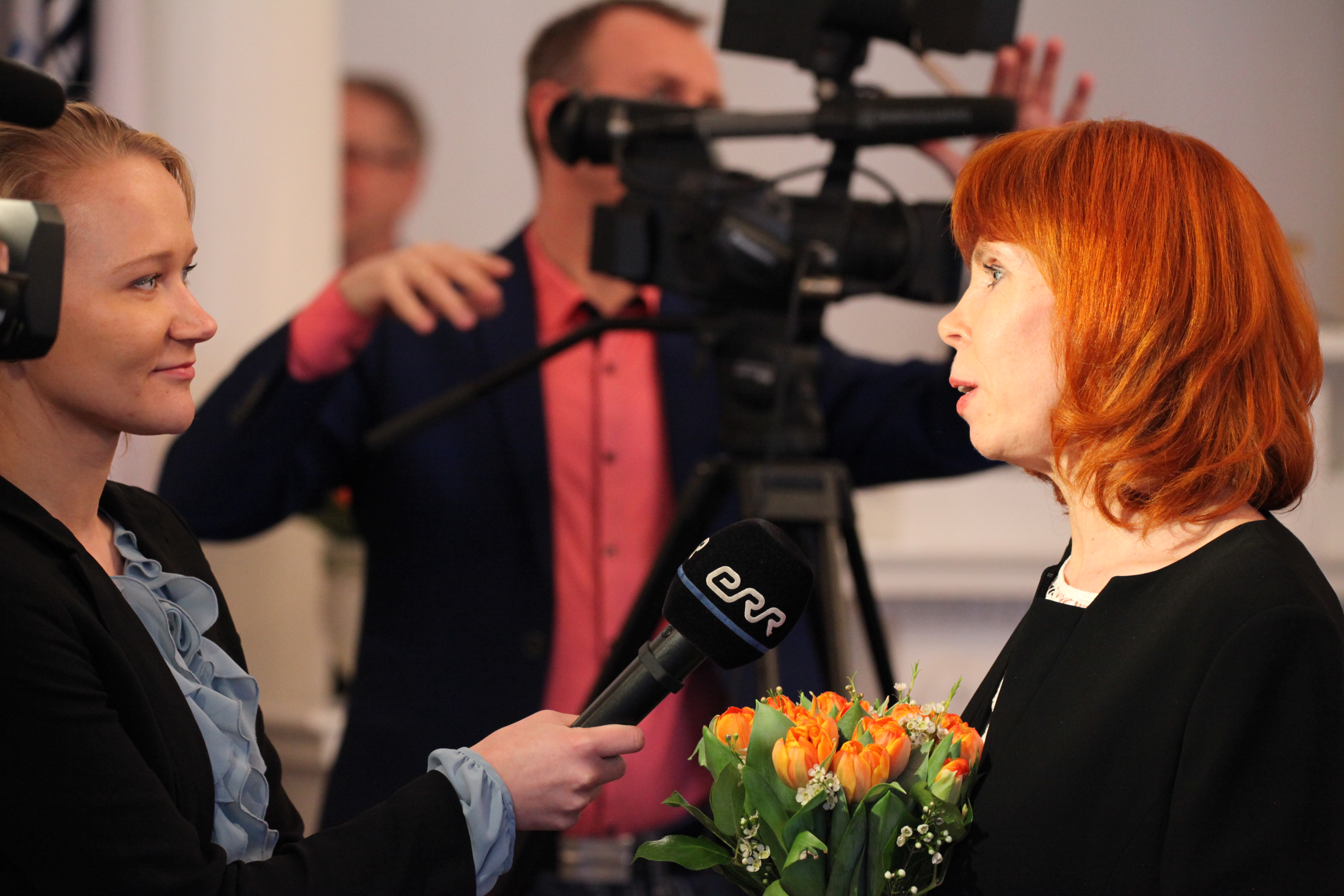
Eesti Rahvusringhääling reporter Susann Kivi interviewing Margit Sutrop, the 2017 candidate for rector of the University of Tartu

Eesti Televisioon is the TV organization of ERR. Eesti Televisioon provides programming on three television channels: ETV, ETV2, and ETV+.

Eesti Televisioon has been primarily an Estonian-language television channel that also broadcasts other foreign-language programs, which according to the law, must be provided with Estonian subtitles. In addition to the Estonian-language daily news it produces, Eesti Televisioon also broadcasts news in Russian (ETV+), which generally does not have Estonian subtitles.

On 8 August 2008, ERR's second television channel, ETV2, began operations. ETV2 airs cultural events, sports competitions, and political forums, ERR news, children's programs, and reruns of programs and films previously shown on the ETV main program.

On 28 September 2015, the Broadcasting organization's third television channel went on the air (the Russian-language ETV+). The channel's goal is to provide objective information about world events, cover local life in Russian, and better integrate the Russian-speaking population into Estonian society.

From 1 February 2019, ERR television channels reached viewers across Estonia in HD quality in the free-to-air network. Parallel broadcasting in SD format continued for at least the next three months. ERR sought additional funding to extend the period until the end of 2021.

=== Radio ===
The corporation manages five national radio stations. Vikerraadio provides a full-format programme, while Raadio 2 specializes in pop and underground music, primarily targeting listeners aged 15–29. Klassikaraadio is dedicated to classical and folk music, jazz, and cultural programming. Programming for linguistic minorities, particularly the Russian-speaking community, is provided by Raadio 4. Additionally, Raadio Tallinn provides news and information for foreign listeners.

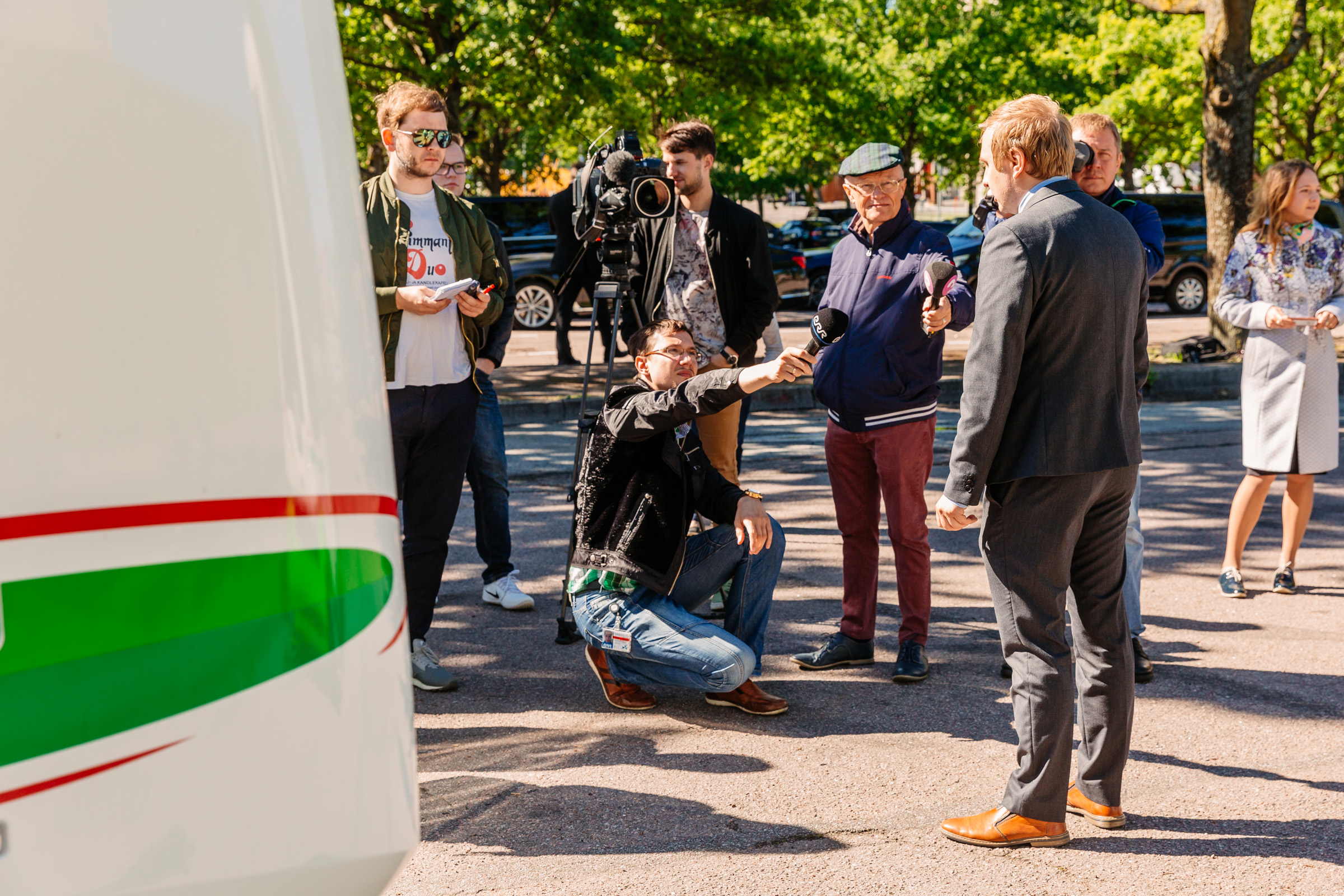
ERR self-driving minibuses

=== Digital news ===
ERR's digital presence is anchored by its main news portal in Estonian: ERR.ee. In addition to its Estonian-language coverage, the organization publishes news on the site in both English and Russian.

== Criticism ==
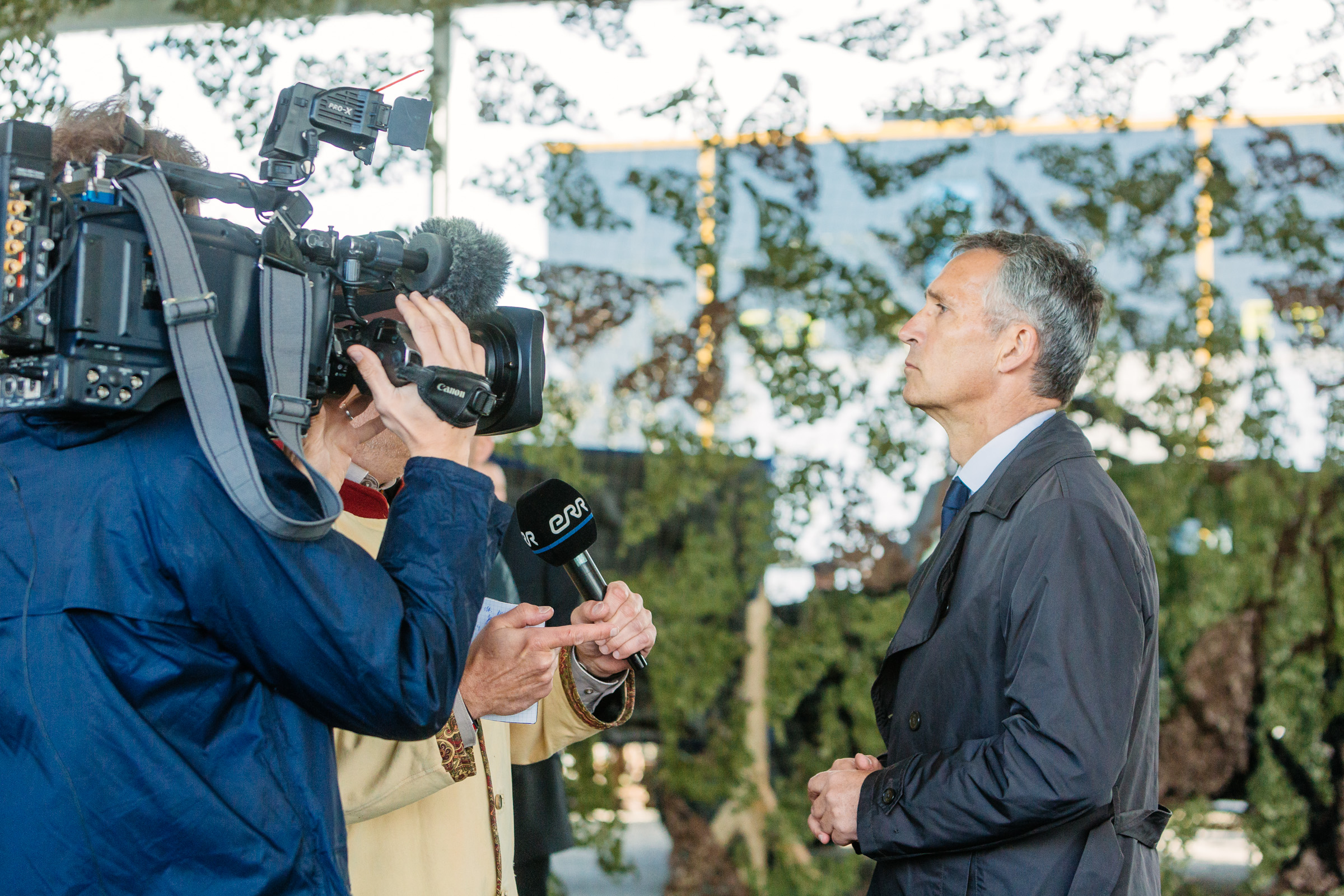
Press trip to visit the allied forces stationed in Tapa. Meetings with NATO units and key figures from the Estonian defence and allied forces

Eesti Rahvusringhääling (ERR) is mandated to be independent in the production and distribution of its services, operating solely in accordance with legal requirements. However, this operational independence has been a subject of ongoing debate. Former ERR Board Chairman Margus Allikmaa has noted that while the organization operates within the framework of law and its development plans, program planning is also shaped by decision makers who are supposed to be operating under agreed ethics.

As a public service, the organization has faced periodic criticism regarding the perceived political neutrality and balance of its coverage. Various political figures and commentators have alleged a political bias within ERR's reporting, with specific concerns raised about political imbalance in news coverage and instances where content has been deemed to contravene good journalistic practices. The network has also faced accusations that they silenced dissenting opinions.

Additional criticisms that circulated after Estonia joined the EU in 2004 (mostly between 2009 and 2011), related to the network's social and cultural programming, with some suggesting that ERR lacked sufficient national focus or failed to engage effectively with Estonia's Russian-speaking minority. Additionally, ERR was criticsed for potentially fueling Soviet-era nostalgia through certain programs, the use of obscene language. There was also discussion of whether the programing contributed to the alienation of voters from democratic processes.

The organization was criticized for a perceived de-popularization of science by not having content that was "playful" or "engaging".

ERR's programming and internal management have also drawn scrutiny. Critics have occasionally described program content as vacuous or lacking in substance, while others have argued that the network risks being overly commercialized or that it engages in unfair competition within the local advertising and film markets. Concerns have been raised regarding the use of taxpayer funds, weak asset management, and alleged mismanagement of personnel, including the dismissal of staff members whose views diverged from organizational leadership.
