= ETV2 =

Estonian television channel

Coordinates: 59°26′3.99″N 24°46′18.21″E

- ETV2's current logo (2018)
- Country: Estonia
- Broadcast area: Estonia
- Headquarters: Tallinn, Estonia

Programming
- Language: Estonian
- Picture format: 1080i

Ownership
- Owner: ERR
- Sister channels: ETV; ETV+

History
- Launched: August 8, 2008; 18 years ago

Links
- Website: jupiter.err.ee/etv2 (Limited programming outside Estonia)

Availability

Terrestrial
- Digital terrestrial: Multiplex 1

ETV2's former logo (2008—2018)

ETV2 (Estonian: ETV kaks) is the second channel of the Estonian Public Broadcasting (ERR) focusing on children's programming. Since the 12th of May 2016, ETV2 aired Family & Friends until 11th of January 2019. On 12 January 2019 aired KidZone TV (now KidZone Max). During the day and providing cultural content in the evening.

ETV2 is known for its quality art house feature film and documentary selection. The flagship in-house production is a cultural talk show. ETV2 began broadcasting on 8 August 2008. Children's programming is also central to the channel, having started following the end of the 2008 Summer Olympics.
