= ETV+ =

Estonian television channel

- Country: Estonia
- Broadcast area: Estonia
- Headquarters: Tallinn, Estonia

Programming
- Languages: Russian; Estonian
- Picture format: Standard definition/1080i

Ownership
- Owner: ERR
- Sister channels: ETV; ETV2

History
- Launched: September 28, 2015; 10 years ago

Links
- Website: jupiterpluss.err.ee/etvpluss

ETV+ is a Russian language free-to-air television channel operated by the Estonian Public Broadcasting. It was launched on 28 September 2015. The channel is aimed at Estonia's Russian-speaking minority airing both news and entertainment shows. The channel's budget in 2015 was 2.53 million euros.

== History ==
The ETV+ name was chosen out of 360 submissions in a competition to find a name for the new channel. According to ETV+ chief Darja Saar, the plus part of the name stems from the Russian words: 'п - популярное', 'лю - любимое' and 'с - своё' meaning 'popular', 'beloved' and 'ours' which together spell plus".

From 2015 to 2018, Darja Saar was the chief editor of the channel. From 2019, the editor-in-chief is Ekaterina Taklaja.

== Ratings ==
In 2018, the channel was in penultimate place among the Russian-language networks available in Estonia, above STS, with an estimated ratings share of 1%. By May 2022 the channel's total audience share in Estonia had risen to 3.1 percent, following Russia's invasion of Ukraine.

== See also ==
- Latvijas Radio 4 (LR4), a Russian-language public service radio station in Latvia, shut down 2026
