= KidZone Max =

Estonian television channel

- Country: Estonia
- Broadcast area: Estonia; Latvia; Lithuania
- Headquarters: Pronksi 19, 10124 Tallinn, Estonia

Programming
- Languages: Estonian; Latvian; Lithuanian; Russian
- Picture format: 1080i HDTV

Ownership
- Owner: Duo Media Networks (Postimees Group)
- Sister channels: List: * Kanal 2; * Duo 3; * Duo 4; * Duo 5; * Duo 6; * Kanal 7; * Kino 7; * MyHits; * Eesti Kanal; * KidZone Mini; * SmartZone; * FilmZone; * FilmZone Plus

History
- Launched: 13 June 2013, 1 May 2026
- Former names: KidZone TV (2013–2023)

Links
- Website: http://kidzonemax.ee

KidZone Max is an Estonian children's TV channel. It is broadcast in 3 countries and 4 languages, although programs are not dubbed into the languages; rather, they are aired in either English or their original languages with voiceover translators speaking over the programs to translate all dialogue into the target language. It was launched on 13 June 2013 at 15:00. A year later, the channel also launched in Latvian and Lithuanian with a unified channel and for advertisements in Latvian, and this happened until 2020 when the channel separated into a local versions.

KidZone has a sister channel called KidZone Mini. The channel airs programs targeted at a younger audience than the main KidZone channel. However, KidZone does show some of KidZone Mini's programs, such as Peppa Pig and Thomas & Friends: All Engines Go, as well.

On 1 December 2022, KidZone TV alongside KidZone Mini, a Russian-language audio track was removed in Estonia.

On 1 November 2023, KidZone TV rebranded as KidZone Max.

On 1 May 2026, Kidzone MAX LT and Kidzone MAX LV has been merged into single feed as Kidzone MAX BLT, for the first time since 2020.
