= Duo 4 =

Television station in Estonia

Coordinates: 59°25′56.66″N 24°45′37.61″E

- Country: Estonia
- Broadcast area: Estonia
- Headquarters: Tallinn, Estonia

Programming
- Picture format: 1080p HDTV

Ownership
- Owner: Duo Media Networks (Postimees Grupp)
- Sister channels: Kanal 2 Duo 3 Duo 5 Duo 6 Kanal 7 Kino 7 MyHits; Eesti Kanal; SmartZone; KidZone Max; KidZone Mini; FilmZone; FilmZone Plus

History
- Launched: March 2008
- Former names: Kanal 11(2008-2021)

Links
- Website: duo4.ee/et

Duo 4 (formerly known as Kanal 11 (literal English translation Channel 11)) is an Estonian TV channel owned by Duo Media Networks. The name of the channel was derived from a play on words; in the Estonian language, "Üksteist", the word for eleven, also means "each other". This meant that the channel promoted itself using sentences such as "We love 11". In 2021 year the new name Duo 4

== Shows ==
Kanal 11 shows mainly reality shows and serials.

- Saint Tropez
- Aardekütt (Relic Hunter)
- After Chat
- Ameerika kõige lollimad modellid (America's Most Smartest Model)
- Gok Wan annab moenõu (Gok's Fashion Fix)
- Jalgpallurite naised (Footballer's Wives)
- Kardashianid (Keeping up with the Kardashians)
- Kelgukoerad
- Kokasaade – Lusikas
- Kuidas alasti hea välja näha (How to Look Good Naked)
- Naistevahetus (Wife Swap)
- Nigella ampsud (Nigella Bites)
- Nigella ekspress (Nigella Express)
- Nigella retseptid (Nigella Feasts)
- Night Chat
- Reporter
- Reporter+
- Rooside sõda (Estonian version of Family Feud)
- Superlapsehoidja (Supernanny)
- Täiuslik koduperenaine (Anthea Turner: Perfect Housewife)
- Tantsi, kui oskad! (Estonian version of So You Think You Can Dance)
- Tõeline seks ja linn (Sex and the City)
- Top Shop
- Võluvägi (Charmed)
- Üllatusremont (Changing Rooms)
- 90210
