= List of newspapers in Estonia =

Below is a list of newspapers in Estonia.

Newspaper	Type	Published	Distribution	Circulation	Year founded	Language	Publisher	Notes
Ärileht		Monthly	Estonia		2010–2013	Estonian	AS Eesti Ajalehed	
Äripäev	National	Daily	Estonia			Estonian	Bonnier Group	
Aseri Valla Leht	Local	Monthly	Aseri Parish			Estonian	Aseri Parish	
The Baltic Guide	Free tourist guide		Estonia			English, Estonian, Finnish, Swedish		
Awwinorm	Local	Monthly	Avinurme Parish			Estonian	Avinurme Parish	
The Baltic Times		Weekly			1996	English		
Baltic Review / Baltische Rundschau	International		Estonia, Latvia, Lithuania			English, German		
Delovye Vedomosti (Деловые ведомости)	National		Estonia		1996	Russian	Bonnier Group	
Eesti Ekspress	National		Estonia			Estonian		
Eesti Elu					2001–present		published in Canada	
Eesti Hääl			England		1947	Estonian		
Eesti Kirik			Estonia			Estonian	Estonian Evangelical Lutheran Church	
Eesti Kütiväe Teataja						Estonian		
Eesti Päevaleht	National	Daily	Estonia			Estonian		
Eesti Päevaleht			Sweden			Estonian		
Eesti Põllumees						Estonian		
Eesti Spordileht			Estonia		1920–1940	Estonian	Estonian Sports Association Kalev	
Elva Postipoiss	Local	Weekly	Elva			Estonian		
Estländische Wochenschau	Local		Tallinn		1929–1930	German		
Haaslava Teataja	Local		Haaslava Parish			Estonian		
Harju Elu	Regional		Harju County			Estonian		
Hiiu Leht	Regional	Biweekly	Hiiu County			Estonian		
Hiiu Nädal	Regional	Weekly	Hiiu County			Estonian		
Järva Teataja	Regional		Järva County			Estonian		
Kaiu Valla Teataja	Local		Kaiu Parish			Estonian	Kaiu Parish	
Kaldad	Local		Tori Parish			Estonian	Tori Parish	
Kareda Vallaleht	Local	Monthly	Kareda Parish			Estonian	Kareda Parish	
Kesknädal	Political	Weekly	Estonia			Estonian	Estonian Centre Party	
KesKus		Monthly	Estonia		1999	Estonian		
Kihnu Leht	Local	Monthly	Kihnu Parish			Estonian	Kihnu Parish	
Kindel Sõna	Political		Estonia			Estonian	IRL	
Kirde Ekspress	Regional		Ida-Viru County					
Kodumaa						Estonian		
Kodumaa Hääl						Estonian		
Koduvald	Local	Monthly?	Kambja Parish			Estonian	Kambja Parish	
Koit	Regional		Põlva County			Estonian		
Kuldkinga Teataja			Tartu			Estonian	Tartu Nature House	
Kuldne Börs	National		Estonia		1992–2013	Estonian		
Kuressaare Sõnumid	Local	Bimonthly	Kuressaare			Estonian	Kuressaare	
Kuulutaja	Regional	Weekly	Lääne-Viru County			Estonian		
Lääne Elu	Regional		Lääne County			Estonian		
Laekvere Valla Sõnumid	Local	Monthly	Laekvere Parish		1996	Estonian	Laekvere Parish	
Leole	Local	Monthly	Suure-Jaani Parish			Estonian	Suure-Jaani Parish	
Linnaleht		Weekly	Tallinn, Tartu, Pärnu			Estonian, Russian		
LõunaLeht	Regional	Weekly	Southern Estonia		2002	Estonian		
Lõuna-Mulgimaa	Local	Monthly	Halliste Parish			Estonian	Halliste Parish	
Maa								
Maaleht	National		Estonia			Estonian		
Marahva Näddala-Leht		Weekly	Tartu, Pärnu, Riga		1821–1823	Estonian	one of the earliest regular publications in Estonian. Published by Otto Wilhelm Masing	
Maaülikool			Tartu			Estonian	Estonian University of Life Sciences	
Mäetaguse Elu	Local	Monthly	Mäetaguse Parish			Estonian	Mäetaguse Parish	
Märjamaa Nädalaleht	Local	Weekly	Märjamaa Parish			Estonian	Märjamaa Parish	
Meditsiiniuudised	Medicinal news					Estonian		
Meie Kodumaa								
Meie Maa	Regional		Saare County		1919	Estonian		
Mente et Manu	Academical	Biweekly	Tallinn		1949	Estonian	Tallinn University of Technology	
MK-Estonia (MK-Эстония)			Estonia			Russian		
Muhulane	Local	Bimonthly	Muhu Parish			Estonian	Muhu Parish	Editor: Anu Pallas
Muusikaleht								
Nädaline	Regional		Rapla County			Estonian		
Narva (Нарва)	Local		Narva			Russian		
Narva Kirik			Narva					
Narva Postiljon			Narva					
Narvskaya Gazeta (Нарвская газета)	Local		Narva			Russian		
Narvskaya Nedelya (Нарвская Неделя)	Local	Weekly	Narva			Russian		
Nelli Teataja	National tabloid		Estonia			Estonian		
Nõmme Sõnumid	Local	Bimonthly	Nõmme			Estonian	Nõmme	
Õhtuleht	National tabloid	Daily	Estonia			Estonian		
Otepää Teataja								
Panorama (Панорама)	Local	Weekly	Jõhvi, Kohtla-Järve			Russian		
Paremad Uudised	Political	Monthly	Estonia			Estonian	Estonian Reform Party	
Pärnu Leht	Regional					Estonian		
Pärnu Postimees	Regional		Pärnu County			Estonian		
Pealinn; Stolitsa (Столица)	Local	Weekly	Tallinn			Estonian, Russian		
Peipsirannik; Chudskoye Poberezhye (Чудское побережье)	Regional		Ida-Viru County			Estonian; Russian		
Põhja Kodu	Local		Narva		1919–1944	Estonian		
Põhjarannik / Severnoye Poberezhye (Северное побережье)	Regional		Ida-Viru County			Estonian; Russian		
Poljana					2007	Russian		Russian-language edition of the Estonian-language newspaper Grüüne
Postimees	National	Daily	Estonia			Estonian		
Prangli Leht	Local		Prangli		1997	Estonian		
Pravo i Pravda (Право и правда)						Russian		
Puhja Valla Leht	Local		Puhja Parish			Estonian	Puhja Parish	
Rääk	Monthly		Estonia			Estonian	Estonian Green Movement	
Rae Sõnumid	Local	Monthly	Rae Parish			Estonian	Rae Parish	
Rahva Sõna								
Rannu Valla Leht	Local	Monthly	Rannu Parish			Estonian	Rannu Parish	
Rapla Teataja	Local, free	Monthly	Rapla Parish			Estonian	Rapla Parish	
Revalsche Post-Zeitung								
Roheline Värav		Monthly	Estonia			Estonian		
Saarde Sõnumid	Local	Monthly	Saarde Parish			Estonian	Saarde Parish	
Saarte Hääl	Regional	Daily?	Saare County			Estonian		
Säde								
Säde		defunct			1946–1990			
Sakala	Regional		Viljandi County			Estonian		
Saku Sõnumid	Local		Saku Parish			Estonian	Saku Parish	
Saue Sõna	Local		Saue			Estonian	Saue	
Setomaa	Regional		Setomaa			Seto		
Sillamyaeskii Kuryer (Силламяэский курьер)	Local		Sillamäe			Russian		
Sillamäesky vestnik (Силламяэский вестник)	Local		Sillamäe			Russian		
Sindi Sõnumid	Local	Monthly	Sindi			Estonian	Sindi	
Sirp								former names: Sirp ja Vasar; Kultuurileht
Sõnumilaegas	Local	Monthly	Illuka Parish			Estonian	Illuka Parish	
Sõnumitooja								
Sotsiaaldemokraat	Local	defunct	Tallinn		1917–1921	Estonian		
Spordileht		defunct			1958–1993 and 1996–1999	Estonian		Sports
Tallinna Postimees	Regional		Tallinn			Estonian		Supplemental newspaper of Postimees
Tartu Ekspress	Regional				2007–	Estonian		
Tartu Postimees	Regional		Tartu County			Estonian		Supplemental newspaper of Postimees
Tudulinna Leht	Local		Tudulinna Parish			Estonian	Tudulinna Parish	
Uma Leht			Southern Estonia			Võro		
Uudisleht								
Uus Aeg								
Vaivara Kaja	Local	Monthly	Vaivara Parish			Estonian, Russian	Vaivara Parish	
Valgamaalane	Regional		Valga County			Estonian		
Vali Uudised	Local		Põltsamaa Parish			Estonian		
Viru Keemik		Monthly			1975	Estonian	Viru Keemia Grupp	
Viru Prospekt (Виру Проспект)	Local		Narva			Russian		
Vooremaa	Regional		Jõgeva County			Estonian		
Virumaa Teataja	Regional		Lääne-Viru County			Estonian		
Võrumaa Teataja	Regional		Võru County			Estonian		
Postimees (Russian)		defunct						
Den za Dnyom (День за днём)		defunct						
Edasi		defunct						
Edasi Kommunismile		defunct						
Eesti Postimees		defunct						
Eesti Sõnumid		defunct						
Estoniya		defunct						
Grüüne; Polyana (Поляна)	Political	defunct	Estonia		2007–2011	Estonian, Russian	Estonian Greens	
Helme Kihelkonnaleht		defunct						
Hääl		defunct						
Kaja		defunct						
Kaubaleht		defunct						
Kodumaa Hääl		defunct			1925-1926			
Kündja		defunct						
Lõuna-Eesti Postimees							Postimees Group	
Meie Meel		defunct			1991–2001			
Molodezh Estonii (Молодежь Эстонии)		defunct			1956 until 2009		Last publisher: Moles Kirjastuse OÜ	
Narva Tööline		defunct						
Narvski Rabotchi (Нарвский Рабочи)		defunct						
Okupeeritud Eesti Sõna		defunct			1992–1993			
Olevik		defunct						
Perno Postimees		defunct						
Petseri Postimees		defunct	Petseri and Setomaa region		1909–1910	Estonian		
Põllumehe Postimees		defunct						
Pärnusky ekspress (Пярнуский экспресс)		defunct						
Rahva Hääl		defunct						
Sõnumileht		defunct						
Tallinna Päevaleht		defunct			1918			
Tallinna Teataja		defunct						
Tartu Kommunist		defunct			1940–1941			
Tartu Riiklik Ülikool		defunct						
Tartumaa Teataja		defunct						
Teataja		defunct						
Uus Eesti		defunct						
Uus Ilm		defunct						
Vaba Eestlane (Free Estonian)		defunct			1952–2001		published in Canada. Followed by Eesti Elu	
Vaba Maa		defunct						
Valgus		defunct						
Virulane		defunct						
Võitlus		defunct						
