= Andres (name) =

- Pronunciation: Spanish: [anˈdɾes] Estonian: [ˈɑndres]
- Gender: Male
- Language: Spanish, Norwegian, Estonian
- Name day: 30 November

Origin
- Origin: Andreas/Ανδρέας "Manly"
- Meaning: Andrew
- Region of origin: Greece

Other names
- Alternative spelling: Andrés
- Nicknames: Andy, Dres
- Related names: Anders, André, Andreas, Andrei, Andrew, Andrus, Andrejs, Andrzej, Andriy, Andreas, Anti, Anto, Andro

Andres or Andrés is a male given name. It can also be a surname. It is derived from the name Andreas.

== Given name ==
=== Andres ===
- Andres Allan (1965–1988), Estonian poet
- Andres Alver (born 1953), Estonian architect
- Andres Ammas (1962–2018), Estonian politician
- Andres Anvelt (born 1969), Estonian politician
- Andrés Borregales (born 2002), Venezuelan-American football player
- Andres Ehin (1940–2011), Estonian writer, editor, poet and translator
- Andres Gerber (born 1973), Swiss football player
- Andres Heinapuu (born 1954), Estonian bibliographer and politician
- Andres Herkel (born 1962), Estonian politician
- Andres Ilves, Estonian-American journalist
- Andres Kasekamp (born 1966), Estonian-Canadian historian and political scientist
- Andres Keevallik (born 1943), Estonian mechanical scientist and educator
- Andres Kollist (born 1948), Estonian chemist, librarian, politician and activist
- Andres Koort (born 1969), Estonian artist
- Andres Kork (born 1950), Estonian surgeon and politician
- Andres Küng (1945–2002), Estonian-Swedish journalist, writer, entrepreneur and politician
- Andres Labrakis (1940–1997), Greek wrestler
- Andres Langemets (born 1948), Estonian publicist and poet
- Andres Larka (1879–1943), Estonian military commander and politician
- Andres Lauk (born 1964), Estonian cyclist
- Andres Lavik (1852–1941), Norwegian farmer and politician
- Andres Lepik (born 1957), Estonian actor
- Andres Levin, Venezuelan-American musician, producer and filmmaker
- Andres Lipstok (born 1957), Estonian economist and politician
- Andres Luure (born 1959), Estonian philosopher, translator and researcher
- Andres Mähar (born 1978), Estonian actor
- Andres Maimik (born 1970), Estonian film director, producer, screenwriter, cinematographer and actor
- Andres Marin (born 1983), Colombian-American rock climber
- Andres Metsoja (born 1978), Estonian politician
- Andres Metspalu (born 1951), Estonian geneticist
- Andres Nuiamäe (1982–2004), Estonian soldier
- Andres Ojamaa (1969–1993), Estonian badminton player
- Andres Olvik (born 1986), Estonian swimmer
- Andres Oper (born 1977), Estonian football player
- Andres Põder (born 1949), Estonian clergyman
- Andres Põime (born 1957), Estonian architect
- Andres Puustusmaa (born 1971), Estonian actor and director
- Andres Raag (born 1970), Estonian actor and singer
- Andres Raja (born 1982), Estonian decathlete
- Andres Salumets (born 1971), Estonian biologist, biochemist and educator
- Andres Serrano (born 1950), American photographer
- Andres Siim (born 1962), Estonian architect
- Andres Skuin (1962–2003), Estonian volleyball player and coach
- Andres Sõber (born 1956), Estonian basketball player and coach
- Andres Spokoiny (born 1968), NYC based Argentine Jewish activist
- Andres Sutt (born 1967), Estonian politician
- Andres Tabun (born 1954), Estonian actor
- Andres Tarand (born 1940), Estonian politician and geographer
- Andres Toode (born 1957), Estonian volleyballer and coach
- Andres Uibo (born 1956), Estonian organist, composer, music producer and pedagogue
- Andres Unga (born 1966), Estonian diplomat
- Andres Varik (born 1952), Estonian politician and agronomist
- Andres Veiel (born 1959), German film director and screenwriter
- Andrés Vilariño (born 1951), Spanish racing driver
- Andres Vooremaa (1944–2022), Estonian chess player
- Andres Võsand (born 1966), Estonian tennis playerkk

=== Andrés ===
- Andrés Aguilar Mawdsley (1924–1995), Venezuelan lawyer and diplomat
- Andrés Amaya (c. 1645 - 1704), Spanish Baroque painter
- Andrés Bello (1781–1865), Venezuelan-Chilean poet, philosopher and politician
- Andrés Bonifacio (1863–1897), Filipino nationalist and revolutionary
- Andrés Calamaro (born 1961), Argentine musician
- Andrés Cantor (born 1962), Argentine-American sportscaster
- Andrés Cepeda (born 1973), Colombian singer and songwriter
- Andrés Duany (born 1949), Cuban-American architect and urban planner
- Andrés Escobar (1967–1994), Colombian football player
- Andrés Galarraga (born 1961), Venezuelan baseball player
- Juan Andrés Gelly (1790–1856), Paraguayan diplomat and politician
- Andrés Giménez (born 1998), Venezuelan baseball player
- Andrés Guajardo (1930–2000), Spanish jurist, businessman and politician
- Andrés Guardado (born 1986), Mexican football player
- Andrés Indriðason (1941–2020), Icelandic television producer
- Andrés Iniesta (born 1984), Spanish football player
- Andrés Machado (born 1993), Venezuelan baseball player
- Andrés Manuel López Obrador (born 1953), Mexican politician
- Andrés Muñoz (born 1999), Mexican baseball player
- Andrés Oppenheimer (born 1951), Argentine-American journalist
- Carlos Andrés Pérez (1922–2010), Venezuelan president
- Andrés Rodríguez (politician) (1923–1997), Paraguayan general and president
- Andrés Segovia (1893–1987), Spanish classical guitarist
- Andrés Temiño (born 2004), Spanish archer
- Andrés Thomas (born 1963), Dominican Republic baseball player
- Andrés Velencoso (born 1978), Spanish model

== Surname ==
=== Andres ===
- Dawid Andres (born 1981), Polish television personality, traveler, and truck driver
- Emil Andres (1911–1999), American racecar driver
- Ernie Andres (1918–2008), American basketball player
- George Andres, American former Marine and Jupiter, Florida resident known for displaying the American flag in a 1999 incident
- Gerd Andres (born 1951), German politician
- Heinrich Andres (1883–1970), German botanist
- Jo Andres (1954–2019), American filmmaker, choreographer, and artist
- Marion Andres (born 1958), Filipino politician
- Sofia Andres (born 1998), Filipina actress and model
- Stefan Andres (1906–1970), German writer

=== Andrés ===
- José Andrés (born 1969), Spanish chef
