= Marek Reinaas =

Estonian businessman and politician

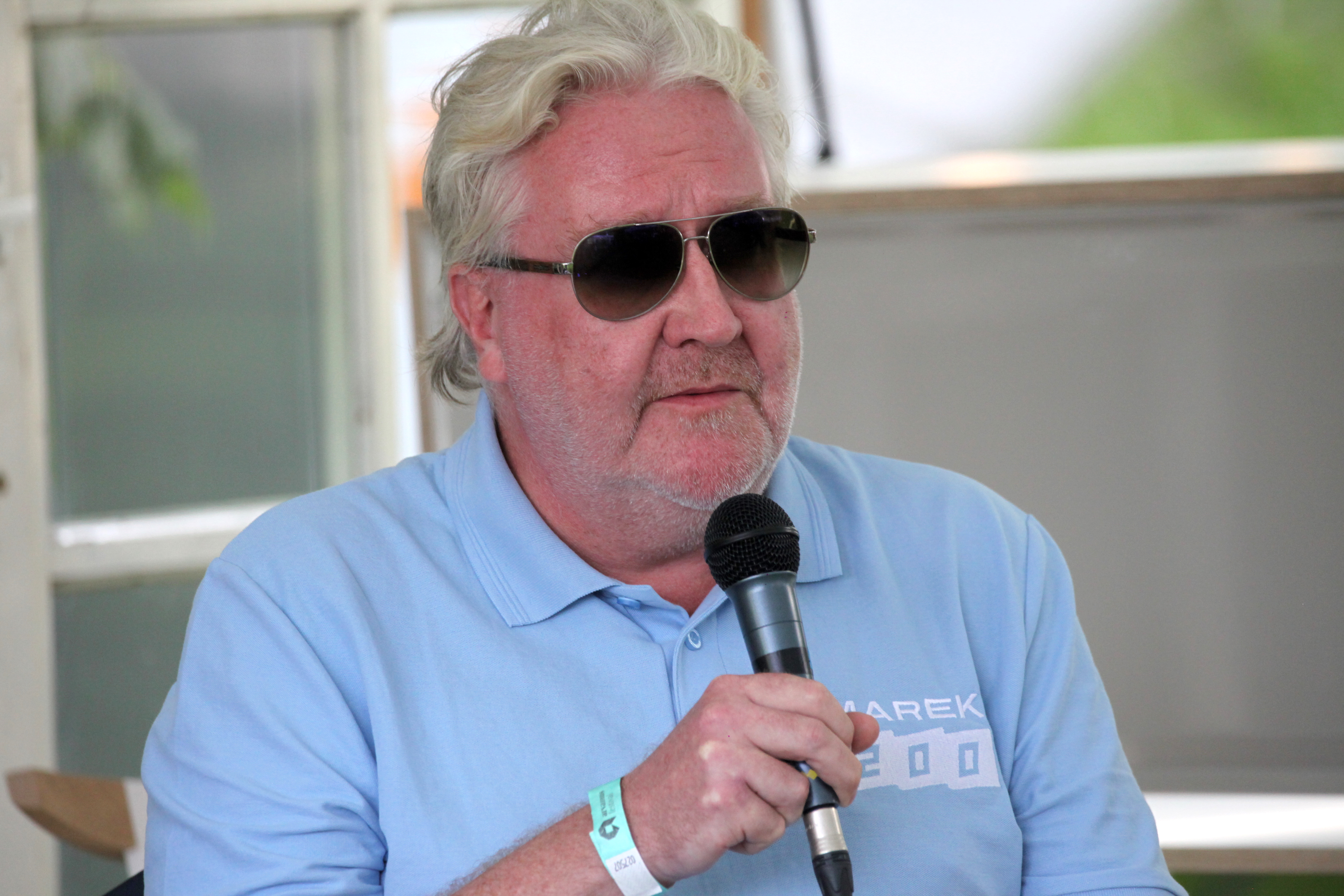
- Marek Reinaas at Arvamusfestival (Opinion Festival) in 2021

Member of the XV Riigikogu
- Incumbent
- Assumed office 2023

Personal details
- Born: March 21, 1971 (age 54)
- Political party: Estonia 200
- Occupation: Columnist, advertising executive, entrepreneur, politician

Marek Reinaas (born 21 March 1971) is an Estonian columnist, advertising executive, entrepreneur, and politician. In April 2023, he was elected to XV Riigikogu, representing the Estonia 200 (Estonian: Eesti 200, E200) party.

== Biography ==
Reinaas has worked as a political columnist for the newspapers Postimees, KesKus, and Äripäev. He has appeared as a team captain on the Eesti Televisioon (ETV) panel show Teletaip (the Estonian version of Have I Got News for You) and on the Kanal 12 comedy entertainment program Punker. He has also appeared in the Eesti Televisioon (ETV) political satire series Riigimehed and the character Jüri Bern in an episode of the Kanal 2 crime drama series Kelgukoerad. In December 2004, he was a celebrity contestant on Kes tahab saada miljonäriks?, the Estonian version of Who Wants to Be a Millionaire?, winning 250 000 kroon for charity.

In 2005, Reinaas created and organized the annual Haapsalu Horror and Fantasy Film Festival (HÕFF). He is the owner and CEO of the advertising company Zavod and co-owner of the Tallinn brewery Humalakoda and the Tallinn pub and restaurant Hell Hunt.

As of April 2019, Reinaas is a member of the Estonia 200 political party. He was a candidate in the 2023 Estonian parliamentary election elections in the Estonian 200 list in constituency No. 2 (Kesklinn, Lasnamäe and Pirita districts). He garnered 2090 votes and was elected to the XV Riigikogu. On 10 April 2023, Eesti 200 elected Marek Reinaas its chair.

Reinaas is the President of the Estonian Tournament Poker Federation and has been a member of the Estonian tournament poker team.
