= Solresor =

Travel and holiday companies of Sweden

Solresor is Sweden's fourth-largest travel agency and was formed in 1989. During their first season the company only offered travel to Gran Canaria while nowadays flights to more than 20 countries worldwide are offered. Solresor is based in Malmö with CEO Anders Hagert, who helped start the company.. Travel shops exist in central locations at Stockholm and Gothenburg. Solresor is owned by Primera Travel Group Scandinavia. This group includes also the Solresor subsidiary Solia, a travel agency in all Nordic countries, and Ireland. For three consecutive years, 2005, 2006 and 2007, Solresor has won the Swedish travel industry's Grand Travel Award for "Best tour operator".

In 2008, Solresor's turnover amounted to over SEK 2 billion, excluding subsidiaries. In the same year more than 200,000 passengers travelled with Solresor. The company has grown each year since its inception. In 2007, sales increased by 40% and the same year Solresor was declared one of the fastest growing companies by the Swedish daily Dagens Industri.

Solresor offers both charters to traditional destinations and long-distance travels with scheduled flights.

== History ==
In 1989, Solresor started as part of STS Student Travel School. During the first year 2,700 passengers travelled with Solresor to Gran Canaria but passenger numbers and the number of destinations increased each year. The big breakthrough occurred in 2000 when Solresor became the first in Sweden to arrange charter flights to the Portuguese archipelago of Azores. Thereafter, the offer of worldwide destinations grew rapidly. Solresor was also the only company to launch charter flights to Salalah in the Sultanate of Oman.

In autumn 2005, Solresor was sold, including the Norwegian subsidiary of Solia, to the Primera Travel Group of Canada, owned by Andri M. Ingólfsson. The Primera Travel Group Scandinavia includes tour operators and travel agencies in all Nordic countries and Ireland. Also the airline Primera Air is part of the group.
