= Kunja =

Kunja may refer to:

- Kunja language (Papuan), a language of Papua New Guinea
- Kunja, a variety of the extinct Bidjara language of Australia
  - Kunja people, or Gunya, who spoke that variety

== See also ==
- Kündja, a settlement in Võru County, Estonia
- Kunjra, a Muslim community of India
