= Allan Alaküla =

Estonian journalist

Allan Alaküla (born 11 September 1968 in Kohtla-Järve) is an Estonian journalist.

Alaküla graduated from the history department at Tartu University in 1993, and then received degrees from Birmingham University in 1996 and the Indian Institute of Mass Communication in 2000.

He was the president of Estonian Union of Journalists from 2001 to 2004 and a member of Estonian Press Council from 1999 to 2003. He was the chairman of supervisory board of Tallinn Television from July 2012 to January 2017. He worked as an editorial writer for the Estonian daily Postimees, as head of the opinion department for the daily Sõnumileht, and as editor-in-chief of the weekly Kesknädal.

He previously held the position of public relations director in Tallinn's municipal administration. He was the head of Tallinn's European Union Office in Brussels from 2007 to 2020. In January 2021, he started a media criticism blog and he has made freelance contributions to various publications. Since September 2021, he has guided local tours in Lahemaa National Park with the nonprofit society Valgejõe Mälutalu.

From 21 November 2021 to 20 April 2025 served as an elected mayor (külavanem) of the village of Valgejõe in Lahemaa.
