= NodeOne =

NodeOne (imBridge NodeOne AB)
- Company type: Private
- Industry: Computer software
- Founded: 2004
- Founder: Thomas Barregren; Jakob Persson; Fabian von Tiedemann; Matts Hildén
- Headquarters: Stockholm, Sweden, Göteborg, Sweden, Copenhagen, Denmark, Oslo, Norway
- Area served: Sweden, Denmark, Norway
- Products: NodeStream
- Number of employees: 50 (Jan 2012)
- Website: nodeone.se

NodeOne was a commercial open-source software company providing products, services, and technical support for Drupal. NodeOne also developed its own Drupal based platform distribution called NodeStream.

In 2012, NodeOne was merged with Mearra, Krimson and the original Wunderkraut, as Wunderkraut Sweden, to form the Wunder Group. In 2017, Wunderkraut Sweden was bought by Digitalist Group and the company is now known as Digitalist Sweden.

== Growth and market presence ==
NodeOne has since its founding in 2004, grown to a staff of over 50. In November 2011, NodeOne was presented with the "Supergasell" prize by Swedish business newspaper Dagens Industri for a 3,346% growth in the years 2007 through 2010.
