= Tallinna TV =

Estonian television channel

Coordinates: 59°26′2.09″N 24°45′4.43″E

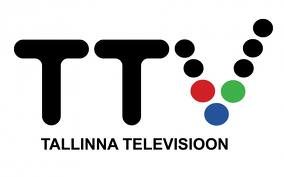
- Country: Estonia
- Broadcast area: Tallinn
- Headquarters: Tallinn, Estonia

Ownership
- Owner: Tallinn

History
- Launched: 1 January 2011
- Closed: 1 October 2019

Links
- Website: www.tallinnatv.eu

Availability

Terrestrial
- Digital terrestrial: Multiplex 1

Tallinna TV was a television channel in Estonia, formerly called Tallinn Eesti Televisioon. It had transmitters in Tallinn, Pärnu, Valgjärve, Kohtla-Nõmme, and Orissaare prior to its diffusion.

== Supervisory Board Members ==
- Allan Alaküla (chairman)
- Leonid Mihhailov
- Aini Härm
- Andres Kollist
- Kaja Laanmäe
- Toivo Tootsen

== Executive Board Members ==
- Toomas Lepp
- Mart Ummelas
