= Tiina Kangro =

Estonian journalist and politician

Tiina Kangro (born 3 March 1961 in Tallinn) is an Estonian journalist and politician. She was a member of XIII Riigikogu, representing the Isamaa party.

Tiina Kangro graduated from Tartu State University (now, the University of Tartu) in 1984 with a degree in English language and literature, and in 1991 with a degree in journalism from the University of Tartu.

From 1986 to 2001, Kangro was the editor and editor-in-chief of Eesti Televisioon (ETV) educational programs, and from 1998 to 2001, she was the program director of ETV. In December 1999, the Broadcasting Council appointed her Acting Director General of ETV to replace Toomas Lepa, who had been removed from office. Tiina Kangro was the Acting Director General of ETV until June 2000.

In 2001, OÜ Haridusmeedia, a company producing media education programs, was founded by Kangro. From 2002 until 2004, she was the head of the open university of Tallinn University of Technology. She has been the editor-in-chief of the weekly newspaper Linnaleht since 2004, and editor-in-chief of Puutepunktid magazine since 2011.
