= Vahastu, Rapla County =

Village in Estonia

Coordinates: 58°56′44″N 25°16′33″E

Vahastu
- Village
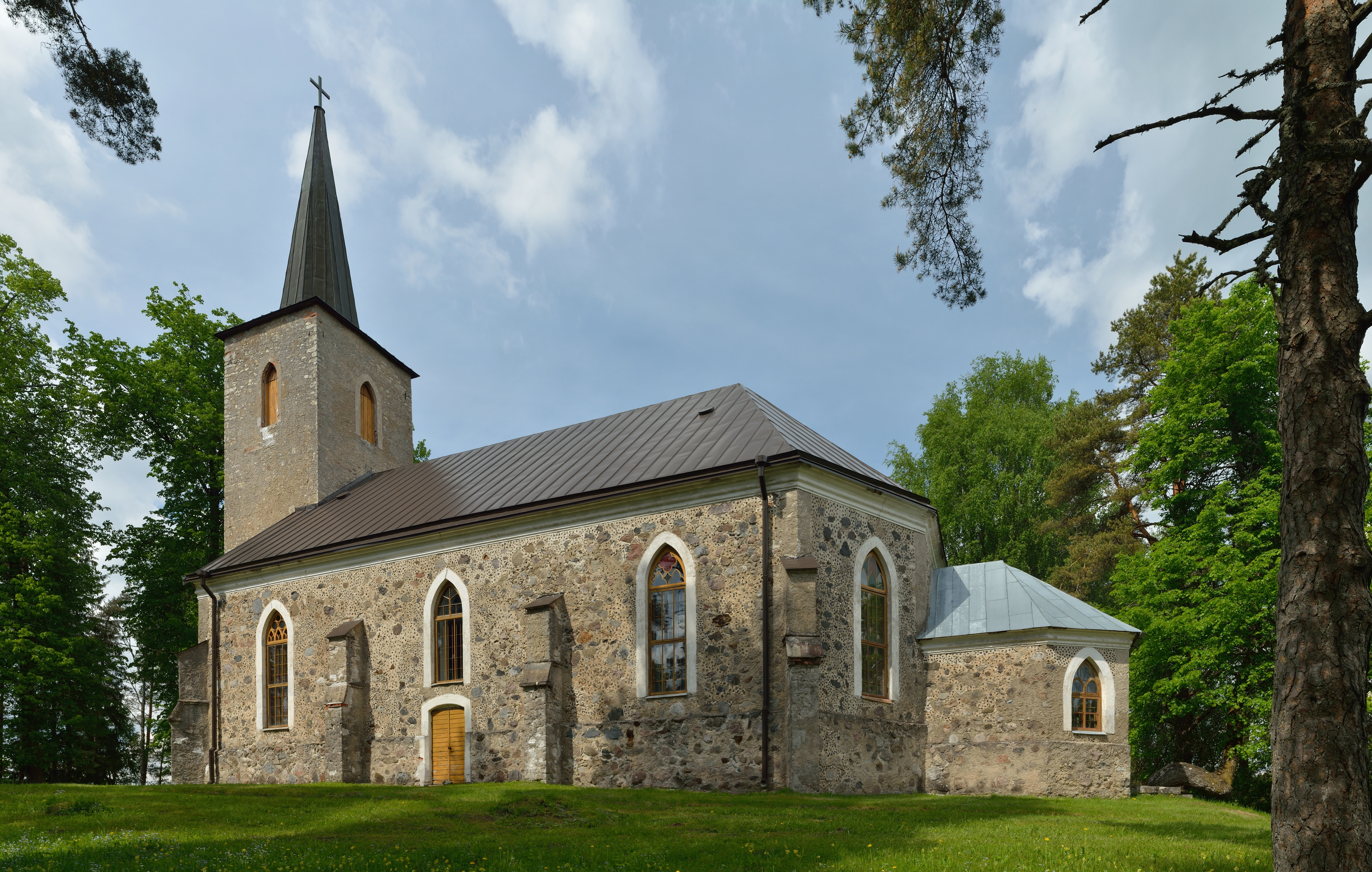
- Vahastu church
- Interactive map of Vahastu
- Country: Estonia
- County: Rapla County
- Parish: Rapla Parish
- Time zone: UTC+2 (EET)
  - Summer (DST): UTC+3 (EEST)

Vahastu (German: Wahhast) is a village in Rapla Parish, Rapla County in northwestern Estonia. Between 1993–2017 (until the administrative reform of Estonian municipalities) the village was located in Kaiu Parish.
