= Kuimetsa =

Village in Estonia

Coordinates: 59°03′N 25°08′E

- Village
- Interactive map of Kuimetsa
- Country: Estonia
- County: Rapla County
- Parish: Rapla Parish
- Time zone: UTC+2 (EET)
  - Summer (DST): UTC+3 (EEST)

Kuimetsa (German: Kuimetz) is a village in Rapla Parish, Rapla County in northwestern Estonia. Between 1993–2017 (until the administrative reform of Estonian municipalities) the village was located in Kaiu Parish.
