= Põlliku =

Village in Estonia

Coordinates: 58°57′N 25°11′E

- Village
- Interactive map of Põlliku
- Country: Estonia
- County: Rapla County
- Parish: Rapla Parish
- Time zone: UTC+2 (EET)
  - Summer (DST): UTC+3 (EEST)

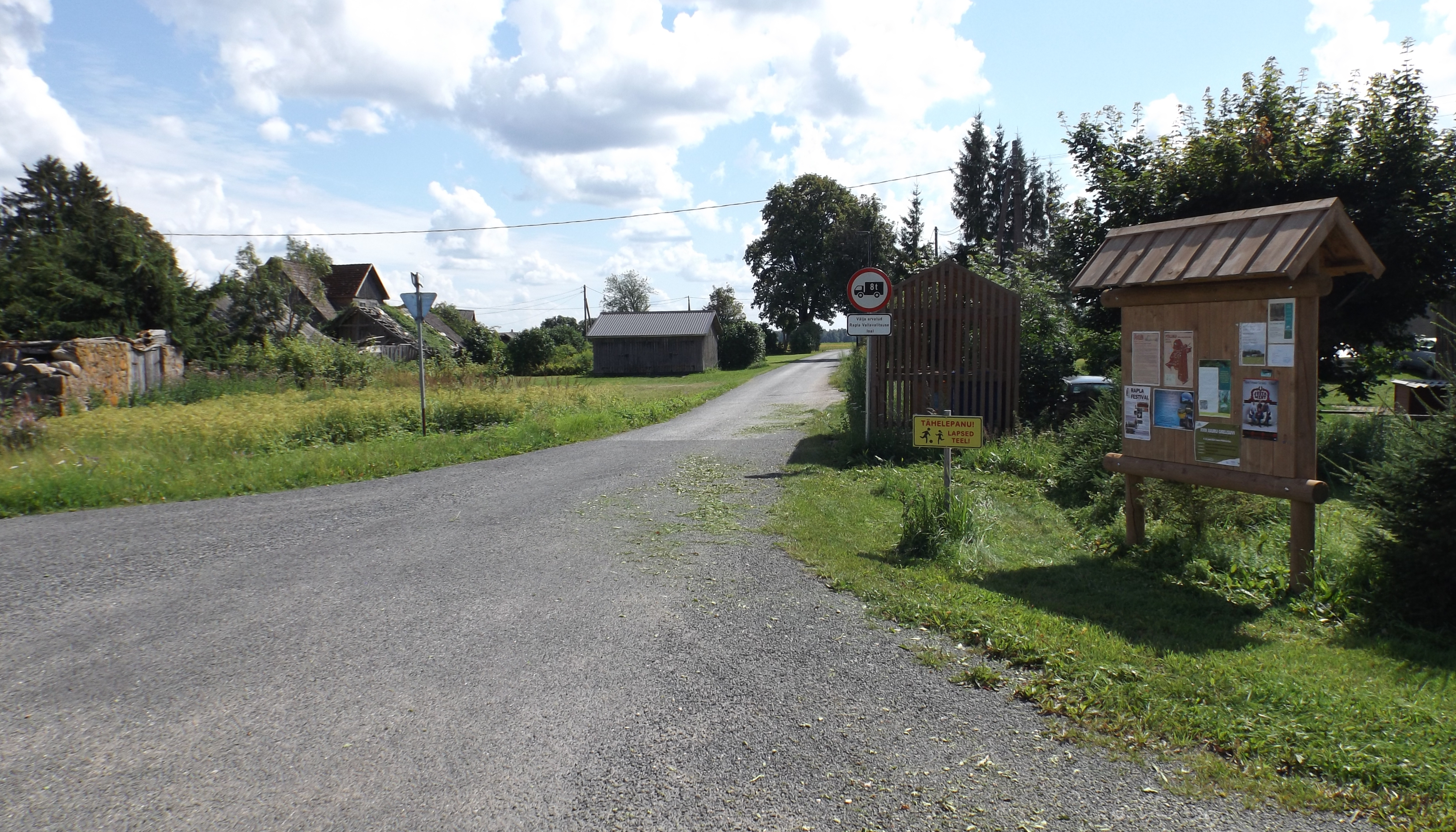
Põlliku village info board

Põlliku is a village in Rapla Parish, Rapla County in northwestern Estonia. Between 1993–2017 (until the administrative reform of Estonian municipalities) the village was located in Kaiu Parish.
