= Säde (1946) =

Estonian newspaper

- Owner(s): Central Committee of the Leninist Young Communist League of Estonia; Estonian SSR Pioneer Organization
- Editor-in-chief: Juta Renzer
- Editor: Ralf Parve (1946–1949); Juhan-Kaspar Jürna (1953–1955); Heimar Lenk
- Founded: June 13, 1946
- Ceased publication: December 30, 1990
- Political alignment: Communism
- Language: Estonian language
- City: Tallinn
- Country: Estonian SSR
- Sister newspapers: Iskra

Säde (The Spark) was a children's and youth magazine published in the Estonian SSR from June 13, 1946, to December 30, 1990. It was the mouthpiece of the Central Committee of the Leninist Young Communist League of Estonia and the Estonian SSR Pioneer Organization.

The first editor-in-chief was Ralf Parve (until 1949), then from 1950 to 1952 Ita Saks, in 1953 Holger Pukk, from 1953 to 1955 Juhan-Kaspar Jürna, from 1955 to 1957 Harald Suislepp, from 1957 to 1962 Arnold Päts, from 1962 to 1970 Lembit Prits, from 1970 to 1987 Juta Renzer, and from 1988 to 1990 Mare Vetemaa, with deputy editor Juhan Haravee.

Säde was initially published on Wednesdays, also on Sundays starting April 6, 1952, and also on Saturdays starting September 12, 1964. The magazine cost 1 kopeck. Its sister publication, the Russian-language tabloid Iskra, was published on Wednesdays and Saturdays from April 2, 1986, to December 29, 1990.

Many later journalists and social figures contributed to Säde as children, including Helar Osila, Ingrid Veidenberg, Tiina Lang, Tiina Joosu, Ainar Ruussaar, Arne Otter, Jakko Väli, Ragnar Kond, Tõnu Ojala, and Allan Alaküla.

Säde's legal successor was Meie Meel (Our Mind), a youth magazine published from 1991 to 2001.
