= Karitsa, Rapla County =

Village in Estonia

Coordinates: 58°59′N 25°00′E

Karitsa
- Village
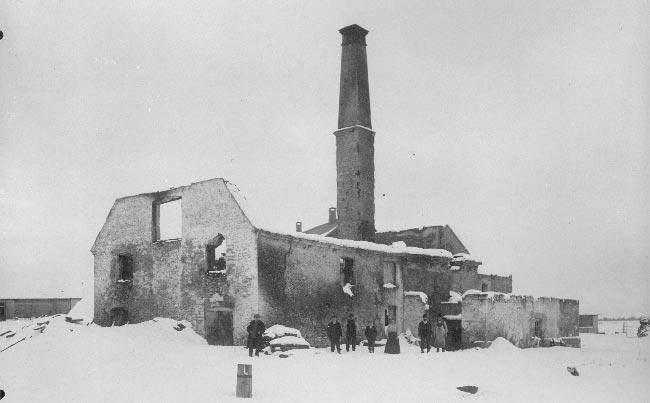
- Karitsa Manor after a fire in 1905.
- Interactive map of Karitsa
- Country: Estonia
- County: Rapla County
- Parish: Rapla Parish
- Time zone: UTC+2 (EET)
  - Summer (DST): UTC+3 (EEST)

Karitsa is a village in Rapla Parish, Rapla County in northwestern Estonia. Between 1993–2017 (until the administrative reform of Estonian municipalities) the village was located in Kaiu Parish.
