= Tapa, Estonia =

Town in Estonia

Tapa
- Town
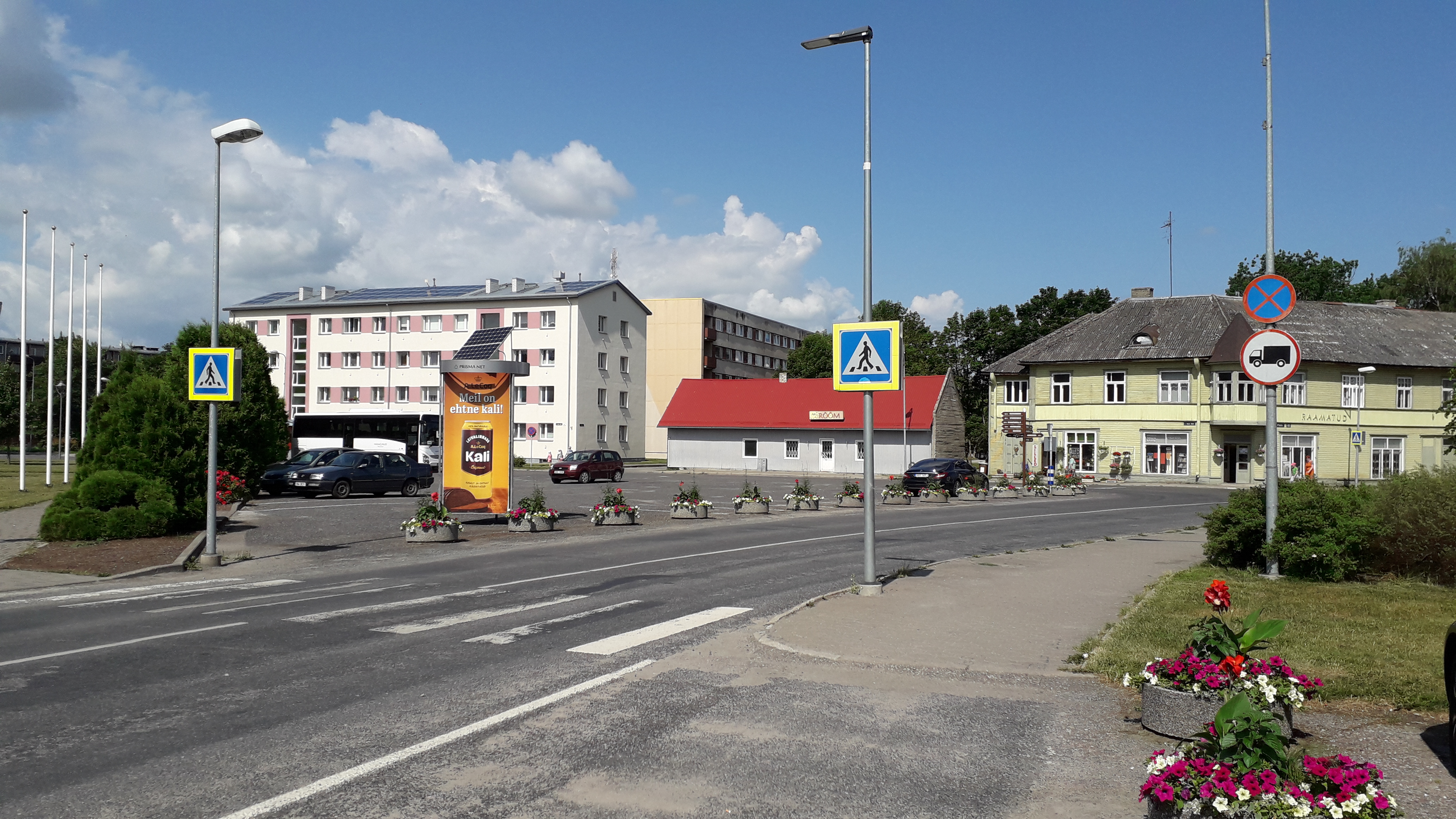
- Central Tapa
- Motto: n/a
- Location in Estonia
- Coordinates: 59°16′N 25°57′E
- Country: Estonia
- County: Lääne-Viru County
- Municipality: Tapa Parish

Area
  - Total: 17.32 km^{2} (6.69 sq mi)

Population (2026)
  - Total: 5,388
  - Rank: 19th
  - Density: 311.1/km^{2} (805.7/sq mi)

Ethnicity
  - Estonians: 59.2%
  - Russians: 31%
  - other: 8.8%
- Time zone: UTC+2 (EET)
  - Summer (DST): UTC+3 (EEST)

Tapa is a town in Tapa Parish, Lääne-Viru County, Estonia, located at the junction of the country's Tallinn–Narva (west–east) and Tallinn–Tartu–Valga (north–south) railway lines. The Valgejõgi River passes Tapa on its northeastern side. Tapa Army Base is on the southern outskirts and the Estonian Defense Forces' central training area (Keskpolügoon) is north-west of the town. Tapa has been known as both a railway and a military town throughout its history.

Tapa developed as a village in the 13th–14th centuries. It was first mentioned in 1482 and the Tapa knight manor (Taps) in 1629. Tapa was officially recognized as a town in 1926. In October 2005, the town merged with the municipalities of Lehtse Parish, Saksi Parish, and Jäneda Parish to form Tapa Parish.

== Etymology ==
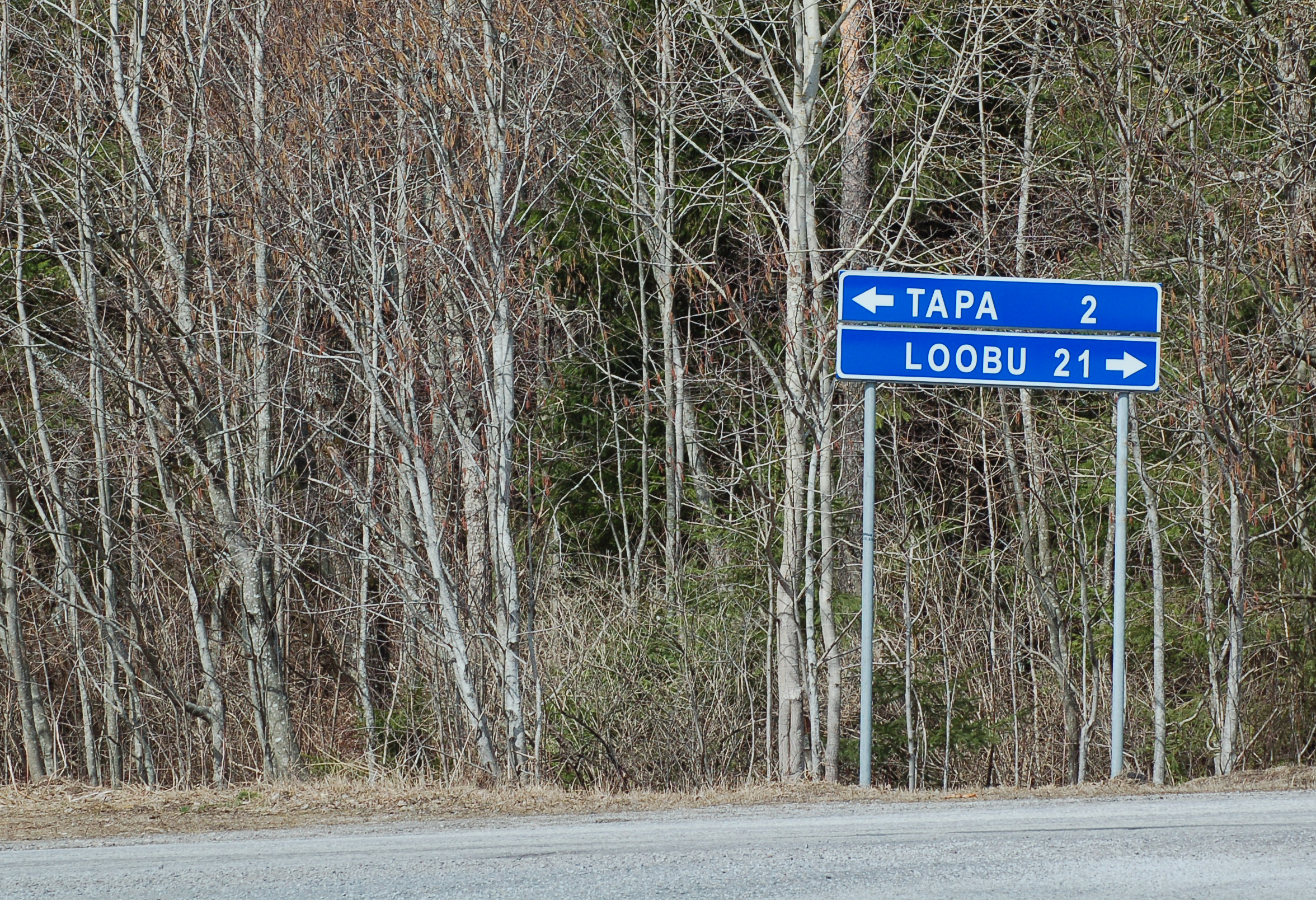
Tapa and Loobu ('Kill' and 'Quit') sign

The etymology of Tapa is uncertain. The name of the town may come from the older form of the personal name Tabbe. Alternately, it may be derived from the Estonian words tapu (a cruciferous plant) or tappo (arable land surrounded by a fence), or from the Karelian word tapos (place of residence).

However, in Estonian, tapa is an imperative form of the verb tapma 'kill', resulting in a purported etymology from the Estonian word 'to kill'. This is considered folk etymology, which led to an urban legend that during Soviet times the town had a newspaper called Tapa Kommunist, which could mean either 'Communist of Tapa' or 'Kill a Communist'. Later, the name was according to legend changed to Tapa Edasi, in Estonian 'Keep Killing'. Both are in fact false; in reality, the local party newspaper was called Edasi Kommunismile (Forward to Communism).

== Railway ==
The Baltic Railway Company opened the tracks on 24 October 1870. Construction of the Tapa–Tartu branch of the railway began in 1875, and the first train to Tartu passed through Tapa on 21 August 1876. The repair shop opened in 1876.

The three long, white rectangles on Tapa's flag represent the three branches of the railway that meet there.

== Military bases ==
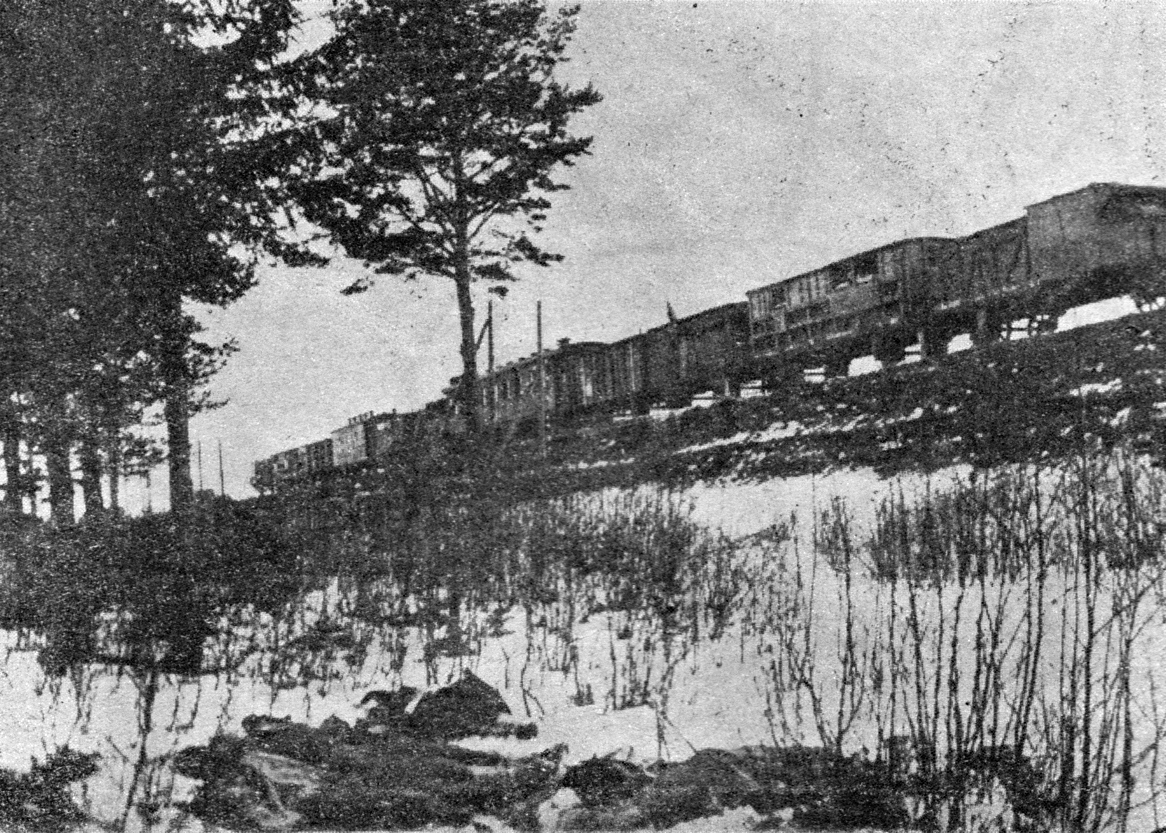
Armored Train No 1 near Tapa on 9 January 1919. Fallen soldiers of the Red Army on the foreground.

On 1 August 1923, an armoured train regiment (Estonian: soomusrongirügement) was formed in Tapa with two armoured wagons: the Kapten Irv, which served in the Estonian War of Independence, and the Onu Tom. On 30 November 1934, a regiment in Valga (in southern Estonia) was moved to Tapa. In January 1941, the regiment was dissolved by Soviet forces. On 14 August 1941, Nazi German troops took over Tapa. The Germans housed their military items here, where the Estonian armoured train regiment's headquarters had been. In 1972, the engineering-technical education military unit no. 67665 of the Soviet army was on the site.

There has been an airfield on the southern edge of Tapa since 1932. The Tapa Aerial Union (Estonian: Tapa Õhuasjanduse Ühing) held its first fly-in on 30 September 1934. The Russians began building a military airfield on the site in the fall of 1939. The Soviets began extensive construction of a military airfield in the spring of 1952. MiG-17s were stationed at the base by the end of the same year. Later, Tapa Airfield was made home to the Soviet 656th Interceptor Aviation Regiment. In 1993, the Estonian Defence Ministry assumed control of the airfield. On 18 June 1993, the first civilian plane touched down on the cement runway.

The phrase "the burning water of Tapa" (Estonian: Tapa põlev vesi) refers to the fact that so much fuel from Soviet MiG-23 fighters leaked into Tapa's groundwater that one could actually set a glass of tap water on fire, something that can be based on fact as Soviet aviation fuel, like most aviation fuels, had a lower density than water and could have floated on top.

As the Soviet troops and their families left Tapa, the town's population dropped from 10,395 in 1989 to 6,800 in 2000. In January 2002, following changes in the structure of Estonian defence units, Tapa became the home of a military base. The Northeast Defence District (Kirde Kaitseringkond) in Tapa includes an army training center, an artillery battalion, an anti-aircraft battalion and an engineer battalion. The base is also home to a British-led eFP battlegroup as part of the 1st Infantry Brigade.

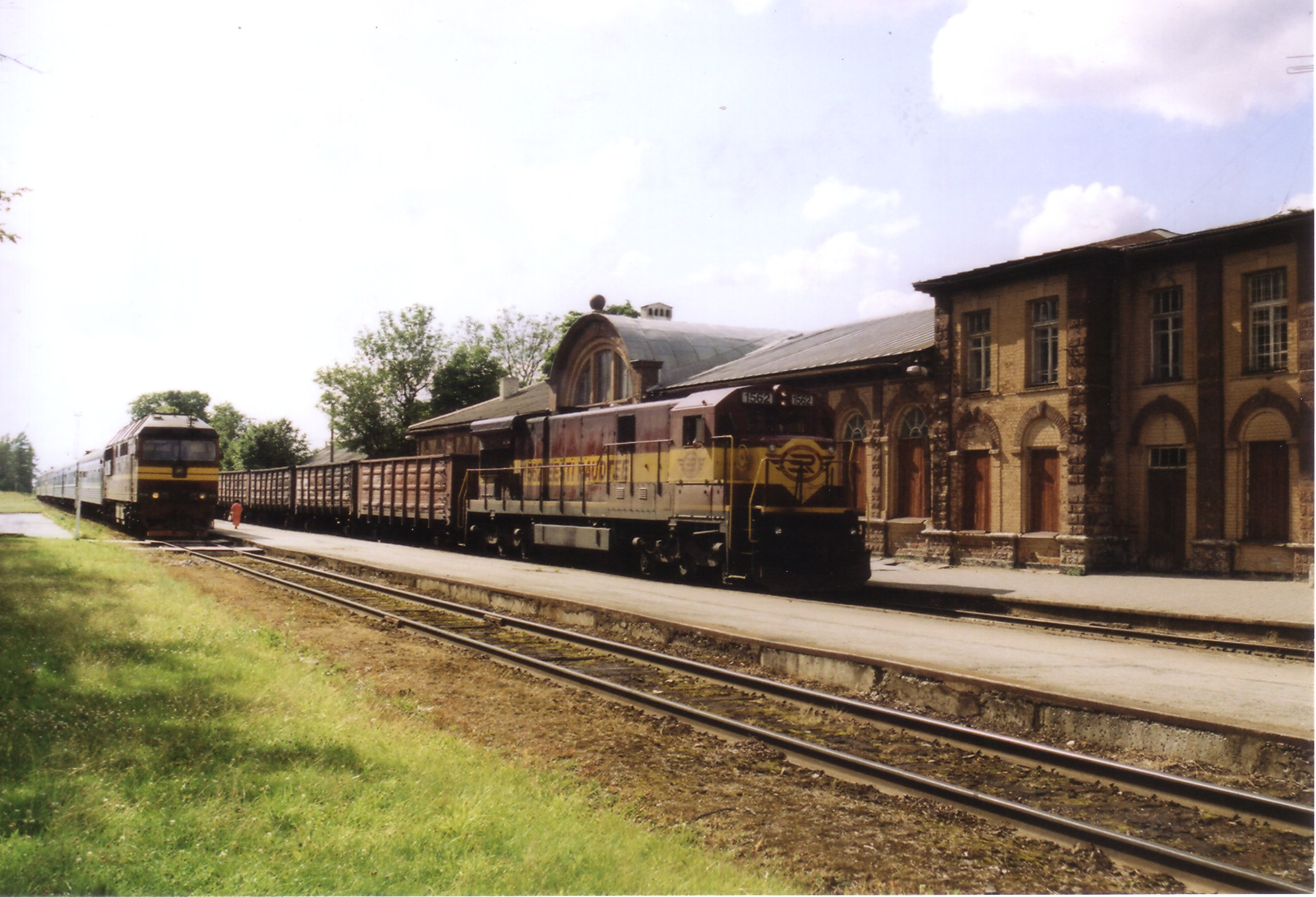
Tapa railway station

On the north wall of Tapa's railway station, there is a bronze plaque, originally dedicated on 9 January 1934 and rededicated on 20 February 1993, that commemorates the Estonian War of Independence. On the plaque is the symbol of Tapa's armoured train regiment. Called "Flying Death on the Railway", the symbol is a skull with a pair of angel wings and wagon train wheels behind it.

== Religion and culture ==
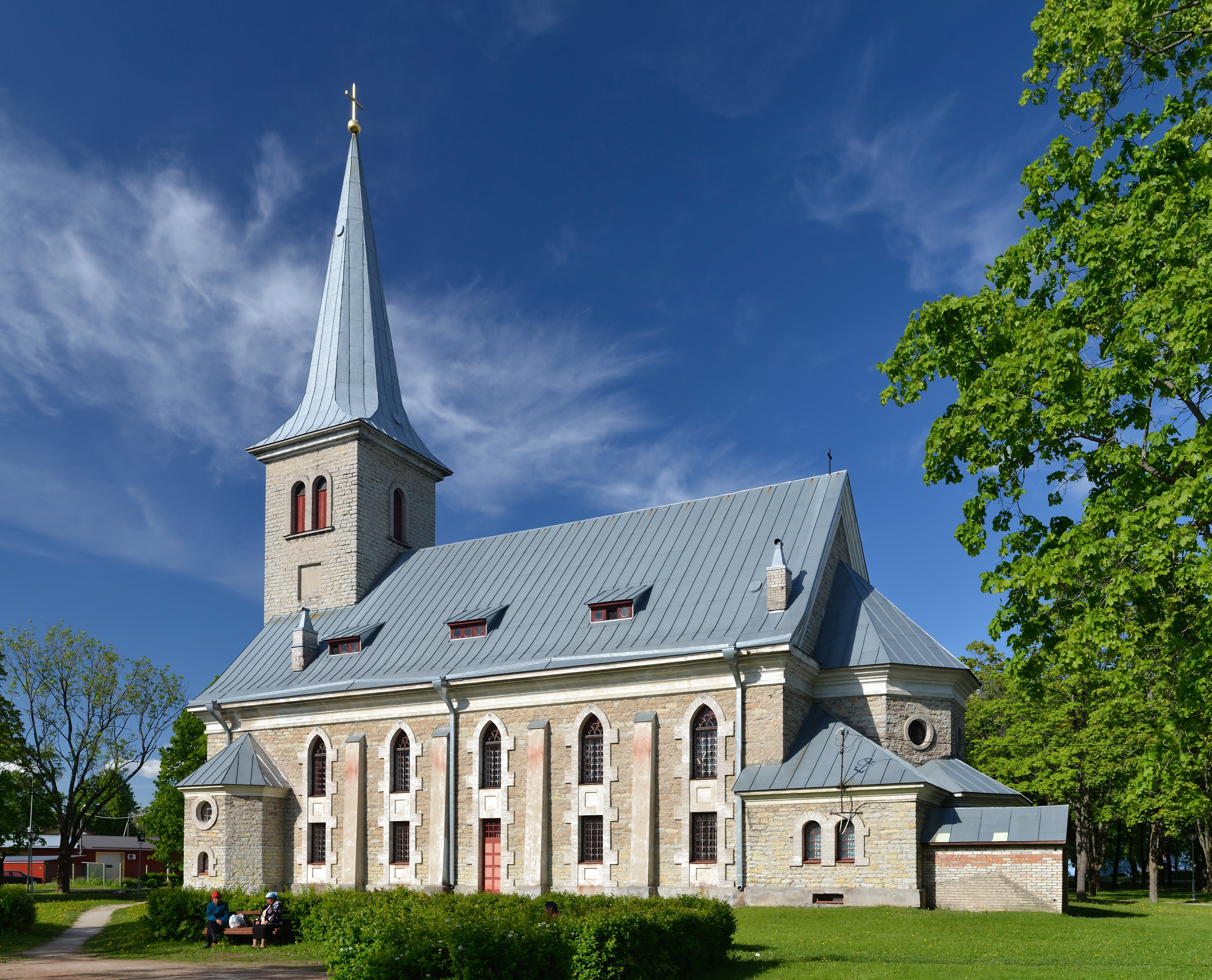
Tapa St. Jacob's Church, an Estonian Evangelical Lutheran Church, was completed with donations from the congregation in 1932.

At services on 2 December 2007, the first Sunday of Advent, the congregation of the St. Jacob's Lutheran Church, celebrated its 75th anniversary. A temporary house of prayer was dedicated in Tapa on 19 June 1921 by the first bishop of the EELK, Jaak Kukk. It was named after the apostle John. St. Jacob's was dedicated on 27 November 1932, the first Sunday of Advent. Either August Tauk or Anatoli Podchekayev is the architect of the neo-historical stone church. The altarpiece, called the "Joyous Christ" or "Come to me", was painted by Russian icon artist Olga Obolyaninova. The church was renovated from 1953 to 1955 and from 1972 to 1974.

On 10 June 2007, the Baptist church in Tapa celebrated its 75th anniversary. The church was established on 12 June 1932, and Philip Gildemann was its first pastor. In 1940, services moved to Tapa's Methodist church building. In 1980, it acquired the building at Kooli Street 1 for Sunday school and other youth programs. In November 2003, it changed its name to the Tapa Living Faith Church (Tapa Elava Usu Kogudus). It holds Sunday services, with simultaneous translation into Russian, in Tapa's Methodist church at Kesk Street 11.

On 30 May 1908, individuals from Tallinn and Tartu met in Tapa to agree on how the Estonian language should be written. The Estonian Literary Society in Tartu and the Literature Department of the Folk Education Society of Estonia in Tallinn convened a conference. The first of four conferences that were held from 1908 to 1911 was in Tapa. The meeting took place in the Harmonie room of what is today Tapa's music school. On 30 May 2008, the 100th anniversary of this conference, Tapa organized another conference on the Estonian language. The theme of the conference was "Language Grows from Me".

Before the conference began, a plaque to commemorate the very first conference was unveiled in front of the music school by Kuno Rooba, Tapa's mayor. The plaque reads "Tapal toimus esimene eesti kirjakeele konverents" ('The first conference on written Estonian took place in Tapa').

== In popular culture ==
The railway station in Tapa served as the Tallinn railway station in the 2008 Estonian movie Detsembrikuumus (December Heat).

== Demographics ==
Ethnic composition 1922–2021
| Ethnicity | 1922 | | 1934 | | 1941 | | 1959 | | 1970 | | 1979 | | 1989 | | 2000 | | 2011 | | 2021 | |
| Ethnicity | amount | % | amount | % | amount | % | amount | % | amount | % | amount | % | amount | % | amount | % | amount | % | amount | % |
|---|---|---|---|---|---|---|---|---|---|---|---|---|---|---|---|---|---|---|---|---|
| Estonians | 2218 | 92.5 | 3518 | 93.8 | 3241 | 95.7 | 4405 | 55.1 | 5034 | 50.2 | 4684 | 43.2 | 3858 | 37.0 | 3726 | 55.1 | 3494 | 59.3 | 3444 | 64.0 |
| Russians | 135 | 5.63 | 160 | 4.27 | 89 | 2.63 | — | — | 3600 | 35.9 | 4460 | 41.1 | 4790 | 45.9 | 2282 | 33.7 | 1870 | 31.7 | 1457 | 27.1 |
| Ukrainians | — | — | 1 | 0.03 | — | — | — | — | 558 | 5.56 | 737 | 6.79 | 852 | 8.16 | 280 | 4.14 | 254 | 4.31 | 250 | 4.64 |
| Belarusians | — | — | — | — | — | — | — | — | 251 | 2.50 | 377 | 3.47 | 358 | 3.43 | 160 | 2.37 | 102 | 1.73 | 72 | 1.34 |
| Finns | — | — | 3 | 0.08 | 2 | 0.06 | — | — | 202 | 2.01 | 184 | 1.70 | 138 | 1.32 | 106 | 1.57 | 50 | 0.85 | 27 | 0.50 |
| Jews | 1 | 0.04 | 9 | 0.24 | 0 | 0.00 | — | — | 35 | 0.35 | 26 | 0.24 | 10 | 0.10 | 1 | 0.01 | 3 | 0.05 | 3 | 0.06 |
| Latvians | — | — | 18 | 0.48 | 11 | 0.32 | — | — | 31 | 0.31 | 17 | 0.16 | 23 | 0.22 | 14 | 0.21 | 8 | 0.14 | 20 | 0.37 |
| Germans | 10 | 0.42 | 11 | 0.29 | — | — | — | — | — | — | 42 | 0.39 | 38 | 0.36 | 6 | 0.09 | 3 | 0.05 | 9 | 0.17 |
| Tatars | — | — | 0 | 0.00 | — | — | — | — | — | — | 44 | 0.41 | 51 | 0.49 | 14 | 0.21 | 6 | 0.10 | 3 | 0.06 |
| Poles | — | — | 9 | 0.24 | 8 | 0.24 | — | — | — | — | 67 | 0.62 | 51 | 0.49 | 37 | 0.55 | 17 | 0.29 | 9 | 0.17 |
| Lithuanians | — | — | 1 | 0.03 | 0 | 0.00 | — | — | 137 | 1.36 | 105 | 0.97 | 95 | 0.91 | 51 | 0.75 | 32 | 0.54 | 24 | 0.45 |
| unknown | 3 | 0.13 | 1 | 0.03 | 2 | 0.06 | 0 | 0.00 | 0 | 0.00 | 0 | 0.00 | 0 | 0.00 | 27 | 0.40 | 9 | 0.15 | 11 | 0.20 |
| other | 31 | 1.29 | 20 | 0.53 | 33 | 0.97 | 3596 | 44.9 | 189 | 1.88 | 108 | 1.00 | 175 | 1.68 | 61 | 0.90 | 48 | 0.81 | 54 | 1.00 |
| Total | 2398 | 100 | 3751 | 100 | 3386 | 100 | 8001 | 100 | 10,037 | 100 | 10,851 | 100 | 10,439 | 100 | 6765 | 100 | 5896 | 100 | 5383 | 100 |

== Sister cities ==
The former urban municipality of Tapa (until 2005) was twinned with:

- Akaa, Finland
- Preetz, Germany
- Dobele, Latvia
- Trosa Municipality, Sweden
- Cumberland, United States

== Notable people ==
- Arnold Alas (1911–1990), landscape architect and artist.
- Evi Tihemets (born 1932), printmaker and graphic artist, associated with book illustration and print cycles
- Alexander Burutin (born 1956), a retired Russian Ground Forces lieutenant general.
- Urmas Lattikas (born 1960), composer and jazz pianist.
- Toomas Kivisild (born 1969), a population geneticist, researches global genetic population structure with evolutionary processes

=== Sport ===
- Aleksander Veingold (born 1953), chess player, winner of the Estonian Chess Championship
- Jaak Mae (born 1972), cross-country skier, bronze medallist in the 15 km event at the 2002 Winter Olympics
- Dmitri Kruglov (born 1984), retired footballer, played 509 games and 115 for Estonia
