= Vaopere =

Village in Estonia

Coordinates: 59°04′N 25°10′E

- Village
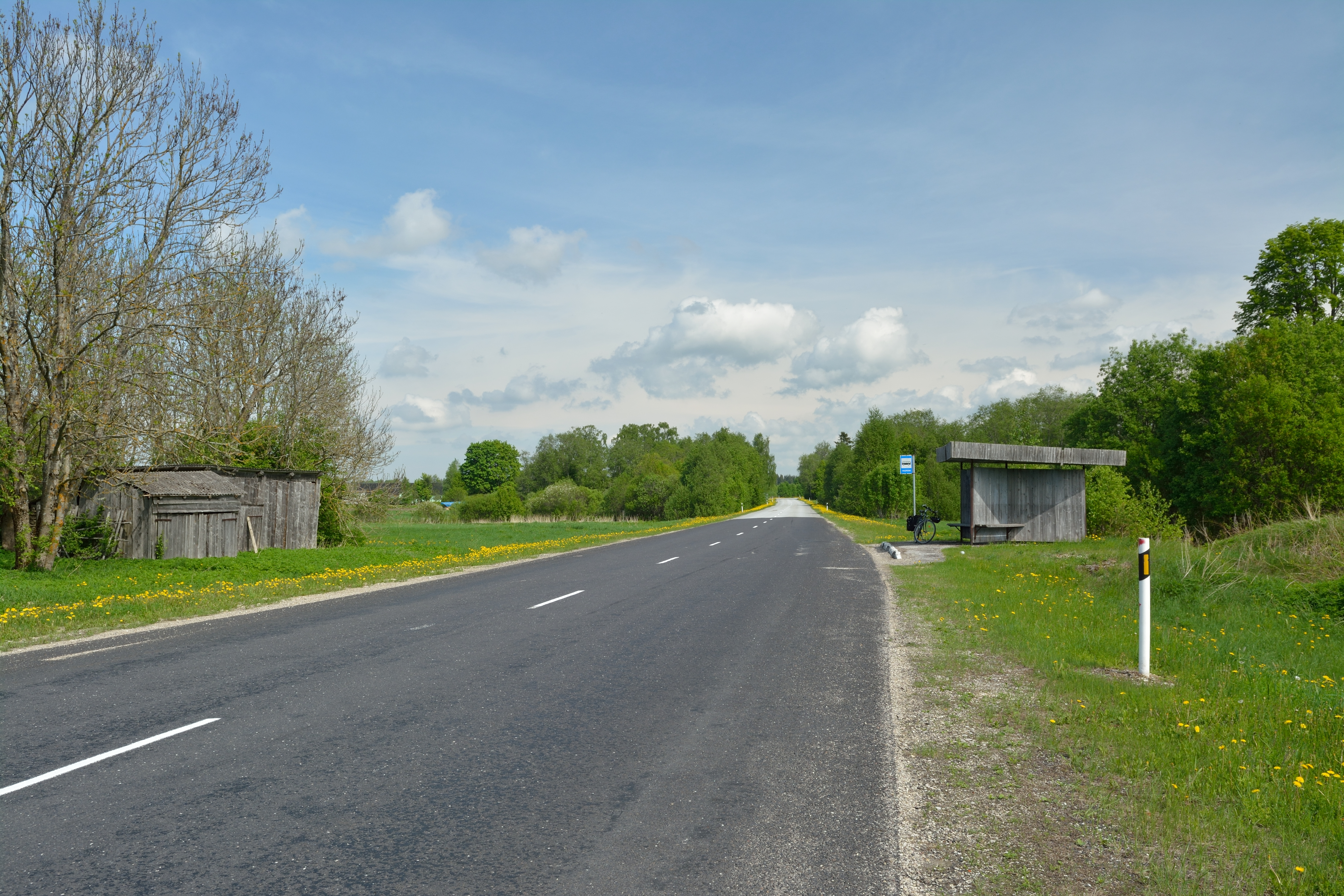
- Interactive map of Vaopere
- Country: Estonia
- County: Rapla County
- Parish: Rapla Parish
- Time zone: UTC+2 (EET)
  - Summer (DST): UTC+3 (EEST)

Vaopere is a village in Rapla Parish, Rapla County in northwestern Estonia. Between 1993–2017 (until the administrative reform of Estonian municipalities) the village was located in Kaiu Parish.
