= Toomas Kivisild =

Estonian geneticist

Toomas Kivisild (born 11 August 1969, in Tapa, Estonia) is an Estonian population geneticist. He graduated as a biologist and received his PhD in Genetics, from University of Tartu, Estonia, in 2000. Since then he has worked as a postdoctoral research fellow in the School of Medicine, at Stanford University (2002-3), Estonian Biocentre (since 2003), as the Professor of Evolutionary Biology, University of Tartu (2005-6), and as a Lecturer and Reader in Human Evolutionary Genetics in the Department of Archaeology and Anthropology at the University of Cambridge (2006-2018). From 2018 he is a professor in the Department of Human Genetics at KU Leuven and a senior researcher at the Institute of Genomics, University of Tartu.

Kivisild has focused in his research on questions relating global genetic population structure with evolutionary processes such as selection, drift, migrations and admixture. He coauthored the second edition of the textbook Human Evolutionary Genetics (2013).

== Selected publications ==
- 1999a. "Deep common ancestry of Indian and western-Eurasian mitochondrial DNA lineages"
- 1999b. "The Place of the Indian mtDNA Variants in the Global Network of Maternal Lineages and the Peopling of the Old World"
- 2000a. "An Indian Ancestry: a Key for Understanding Human Diversity in Europe and Beyond"
- 2000b. "The origins of southern and western Eurasian populations: an mtDNA study"
- 2003a. "The Genetics of Language and Farming Spread in India"
- 2003b. "The Genetic Heritage of the Earliest Settlers Persists Both in Indian Tribal and Caste Populations" ,
- The emerging limbs and twigs of the East Asian mtDNA tree.
- Kivisild, T; Reidla, M; Metspalu, E; et al. (November 2004). "Ethiopian mitochondrial DNA heritage: tracking gene flow across and around the gate of tears". Am. J. Hum. Genet. 75 (5): 752–70. doi:10.1086/425161. PMC 1182106. PMID 15457403.
- Mait, Metspalu; Kivisild, Toomas; et al. (2004). "Most of the extant mtDNA boundaries in South and Southwest Asia were likely shaped during the initial settlement of Eurasia by anatomically modern humans". BMC Genetics. 5: 26. doi:10.1186/1471-2156-5-26. PMC 516768. PMID 15339343.
- 2005a. Different population histories of the Mundari- and Mon-Khmer-speaking Austro-Asiatic tribes inferred from the mtDNA 9-bp deletion/insertion polymorphism in Indian populations
- 2005b. Reconstructing the Origin of Andaman Islanders
- 2005c. Tracing Modern Human Origins
- 2006a. Response to Comment on‘‘Reconstructing the Origin of Andaman Islanders’’
- 2006b. Sahoo, S.; Kivisild, T; et al. (2006). "A prehistory of Indian Y chromosomes: Evaluating demic diffusion scenarios". Proceedings of the National Academy of Sciences of the United States of America. 103 (4): 843–8. Bibcode:2006PNAS..103..843S. doi:10.1073/pnas.0507714103. PMC 1347984. PMID 16415161.
- 2006c. The role of selection in the evolution of human mitochondrial genomes.
- 2007. Peopling of South Asia: investigating the caste-tribe continuum in India
- 2007. Revealing the prehistoric settlement of Australia by Y chromosome and mtDNA analysis
