= Delovõje Vedomosti =

Estonian newspaper

- Type: Weekly
- Format: Berliner
- Owner: Bonnier Group
- Publisher: AS Äripäev
- Founded: 1996
- Language: Russian
- Headquarters: Tallinn, Estonia
- ISSN: 1406-2593
- Website: www.dv.ee

Delovõje Vedomosti (Estonian romanization of Russian: Деловые Ведомости, English: Business News) is a Russian-language financial newspaper published in Estonia, founded in 1996.

Delovõje Vedomosti is a weekly newspaper, which offers mostly content related to economy, but also covers politics, culture and entertainment.

The newspaper's first issue was released on 27 November 1996. It is published by AS Äripäev, which is owned by the Swedish media group Bonnier.

== See also ==
- Äripäev
