= Tamsi, Rapla County =

Village in Estonia

Coordinates: 59°04′17″N 25°05′36″E

Tamsi
- Village
- Interactive map of Tamsi
- Country: Estonia
- County: Rapla County
- Parish: Rapla Parish
- Time zone: UTC+2 (EET)
  - Summer (DST): UTC+3 (EEST)

Tamsi is a village in Rapla Parish, Rapla County in northwestern Estonia. Between 1993 and 2017 (until the administrative reform of Estonian municipalities) the village was located in Kaiu Parish.
