= Grüüne =

Estonian newspaper published by Estonian Greens

- Founded: January 2007
- Language: Estonian
- Website: www.gryyne.ee

Grüüne is a newspaper published in Estonia by the political party Estonian Greens.

It was first published in January 2007. In 2010, it was only published online. By 2013, the last issue has been published in 2011.

Grüüne has a parallel sister newspaper Poljana (Russian: Поляна) which is published in Russian.
