= Meie Meel =

Estonian newspaper

- Publisher: Ajakirjade Kirjastus
- Editor-in-chief: Mare Vetemaa
- Founded: 1991
- Ceased publication: 2001
- Language: Estonian
- City: Tallinn
- Country: Estonia

Meie Meel (Our Mind) was a youth newspaper published in Estonia between 1991 and 2001. It was the legal successor of the newspaper Säde, the mouthpiece of the Leninist Young Communist League of Estonia and the Estonian SSR Pioneer Organization, which ceased operations in 1990.

Initially, Meie Meele had a print run of over 23,000 copies, and it even reached 30,000 in January 1993, but circulation fell to only 6,000 in 2001.

Ajakirjade Kirjastus stopped publishing the paper on February 7, 2001, citing the smallness of the market and the low purchasing power of the target group, which in turn led to losses and poor future prospects.

The chief editor of the newspaper was Mare Vetemaa.
