= Kaiu =

Borough in Estonia

- Small borough
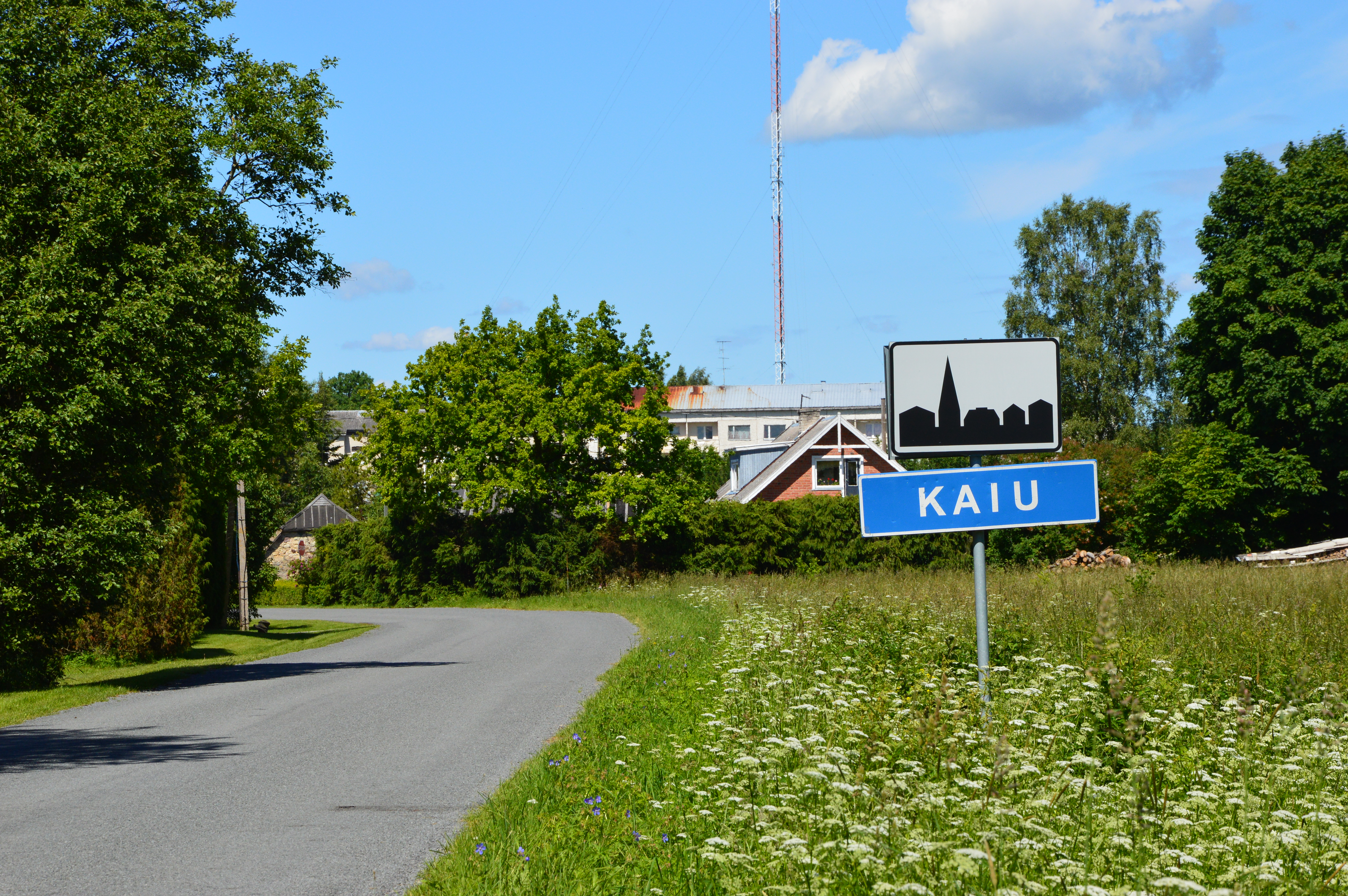

- Location in Estonia
- Coordinates: 59°00′51″N 25°03′06″E
- Country: Estonia
- County: Rapla County
- Municipality: Rapla Parish

Kaiu is a small borough (Estonian: alevik) in Rapla Parish, Rapla County, Estonia.

Between 1993 and 2017 (until the administrative reform of Estonian local governments ), the town was the administrative center of Kaiu Parish.
