= Mart Ummelas =

Estonian journalist (1953–2020)

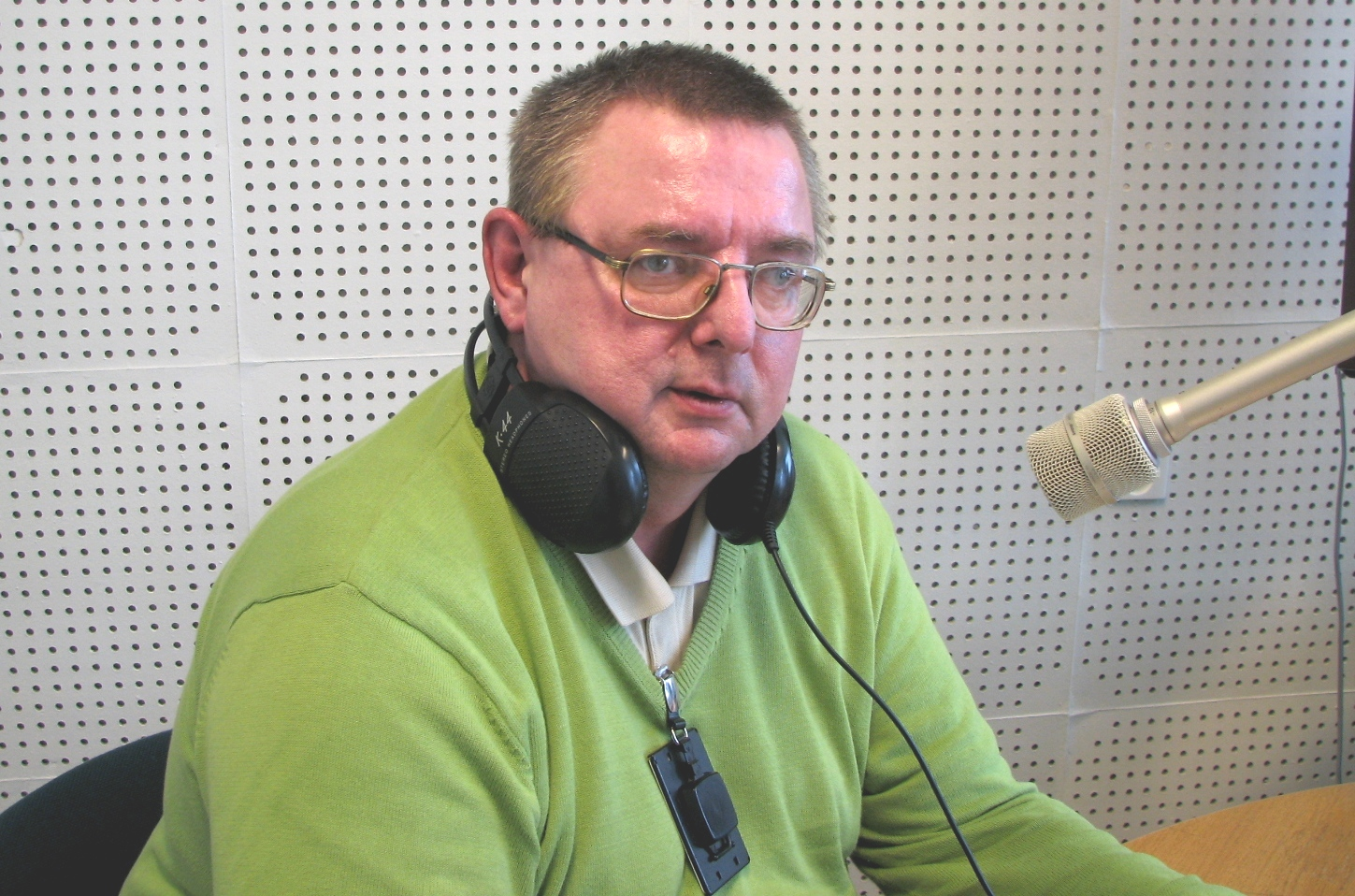
- Mart Ummelas in 2011
- Born: 20 August 1953; Tallinn, Estonia
- Died: 13 March 2020 (aged 66)
- Occupation: journalist

Mart Ummelas (20 August 1953 – 13 March 2020) was an Estonian journalist.

He was a member of the Executive Board of Tallinn Television.
