= Toomja =

Village in Estonia

Coordinates: 59°01′N 25°05′E

- Village
- Interactive map of Toomja
- Country: Estonia
- County: Rapla County
- Parish: Rapla Parish

Population (2011)
  - Total: 44
- Time zone: UTC+2 (EET)
  - Summer (DST): UTC+3 (EEST)

Toomja is a village, situated in the region Raplamaa near Rapla Parish, in northwestern Estonia. Between 1993 and 2017 (until the administrative reform of Estonian municipalities), the village was located in Kaiu Parish.
