= Õhtuleht =

Estonian newspaper

- Type: Daily newspaper
- Owner(s): AVH Grupp AS and Ekspress Grupp
- Founded: 1944
- Language: Estonian
- Headquarters: Tallinn, Estonia
- Circulation: 31,700 (as of February 2024)
- Website: ohtuleht.ee

Õhtuleht (lit. 'Evening Paper') is the largest daily newspaper in Estonia. It is a tabloid newspaper. The newspaper is published in Tallinn in Estonian.

== History and profile ==
Õhtuleht was established in 1944. On 3 July 2000 two rival tabloid papers in Estonia, Õhtuleht and Sõnumileht (lit. 'The Messenger'), merged, becoming SL Õhtuleht. On 6 October 2008 the name was shortened back to Õhtuleht.

The paper has a liberal-conservative political stance. It is owned by Ekspress Grupp and AVH Grupp AS.

Õhtuleht is available online at Ohtuleht.ee. Initially, at first the online version was just a copy of the paper, but now is turning into an online news stream and an entertainment centre with approximately 150,000 users.
