= Ajakirjade Kirjastus =

Estonian publishing house

Ajakirjade Kirjastus was an Estonian publisher that existed from 2000 to 2018.

The publisher was established in 2000, when Eesti Ajakirjade Kirjastus (a subsidiary of Eesti Meedia) and Ajakirjade Grupp (a subsidiary of Ekspress Grupp) merged. In 2010, the publisher issued 24 magazines and newspapers. The publisher was the owner of portals such as NaisteMaailm.ee, Kroonika.ee, Toidutare.ee, and Telekas.ee. From 2011 onward, the publisher also sold magazines through a digital news-stall (Estonian: lehekiosk) called Zinio.
