= Põhjarannik =

Estonian newspaper

- Language: Estonian

Põhjarannik is a newspaper published in Estonia.
