= Edasi Kommunismile =

Estonian newspaper

- Founded: 1951
- Ceased publication: 1962
- Political alignment: Communism
- Language: Estonian
- Headquarters: Tapa, Estonian SSR

Edasi Kommunismile ("Forward for Communism") was a Soviet newspaper published in the Tapa Rayon, Estonian SSR between 1951 and 1962. The publication ceased when the Tapa Rayon was disestablished.

The newspaper was published 3 times a week.

There used to be an urban legend that the newspaper was published under the name Tapa Kommunist (in Estonian, "tapa" is also imperative form of "tapma" (to kill)), so the name would have meant either "The Communist of Tapa" or "Kill the Communist"; and that later the name was changed to Tapa Edasi, which would have meant either "Tapa Forward" or "Keep Killing". However, in real life, the paper was never published under these names.
