= Andres Küng =

Estonian-Swedish journalist, politician

Andres Küng (13 September 1945 – 10 December 2002) was a Swedish journalist, writer, entrepreneur and politician of Estonian origin. He was born in Ockelbo in Gävleborg County to a family of refugees from Soviet occupied Estonia.

== Career ==
=== Literature ===
As he himself noted, Küng "published more than 50 books, most on the Baltic States, thousands of articles and held innumerable lectures on why Estonia, Latvia and Lithuania should (and would) become independent again."

=== Politics ===
Küng was active in both Swedish politics (member of the People's Party – Liberals) and Estonian and Baltic émigré activities. He was the chairman of the Liberal Students Club of Stockholm between 1966 and 67. Later, he served as the Deputy Board member of the People's Party Youth League. During 1970–71, he was the acting Deputy member 1982 of Riksdag. Küng also participated in the Estonian Liberal Party in exile and several other organisations and campaigns for Baltic struggle for independence. He was a member of the party board for the Swedish Liberal Party from 1982 until 1991.

== Noted awards ==
In November 1998, Andres Küng was awarded the Latvian Order of the Three Stars by the Latvian President Guntis Ulmanis. In February 1999, he was awarded the Estonian Order of the White Star by the Estonian President Lennart Meri.

== Bibliography ==
- Estland - en studie i imperialism, Aldus/Bonniers 1971
- Vad händer i Baltikum?, Aldus/Bonniers, 1973
- Förlovat och forlorat land. Reportage från Palestina, 1974
- Unelma vapaudesta, Passiivinen vastarinta nyky-Baltiassa, 1979 ISBN 951-95192-9-7
- Bruce Olson: Missionary or colonizer?, 1981 ISBN 0-915684-83-7
- Sådan är socialismen, Timbro, 1982
- Vindens barn: Om medlöperi förr och nu, Timbro, 1983 ISBN 91-7566-030-X
- A dream of freedom: Four decades of national survival versus Russian imperialism in Estonia, Latvia, and Lithuania, 1940–1980 ISBN 0-906967-05-8
- Sverige och Estland: äntligen goda grannar?, 1991 ISBN 91-24-16473-9
- Kommunismen och Baltikum, 1999 ("Communism and the Baltic States", see online https://web.archive.org/web/20060504183740/http://www.rel.ee/swe/kommunism_och_baltikum.htm)
- Communism and Crimes against Humanity in the Baltic states, c 1999, refer https://web.archive.org/web/20140616162322/http://www.hot.ee/evlliit/okup_2.htm
- Ett liv för Baltikum : journalistiska memoarer. – Stockholm : Timbro, 2002. – 351 s. : ill. – ISBN 91-7566-530-1 (Estonian edition: Baltikumile elatud aastad : ajakirjaniku mälestused. – Tallinn, Olion, 2002.)

For the complete list, see .
