= Roheline Värav =

Estonian newspaper

- Language: Estonian

Roheline Värav is a newspaper published in Estonia.
