= Andrus =

Andrus may refer to:

== Places ==
- Andrus Island, island in the Sacramento-San Joaquin River Delta, California, United States
- Mount Andrus, shield volcano in Antarctica

== Surname ==
- Bart Andrus (born 1958), American football coach
- Bill Andrus (1907–1982), American baseball player
- Burton C. Andrus (1892–1977), American soldier
- Cecil D. Andrus (1931–2017), American politician
- Chuck Andrus (1928–1997), American jazz double-bassist
- Clift Andrus (1890–1968), American general
- Elvis Andrus (born 1988), Venezuelan baseball player
- Ethel Percy Andrus (1884–1967), American educator and founder of the AARP
- Evelyn Andrus (1909–1972), Canadian photographer
- Fred Andrus (1850–1937), American baseball player
- Henry Andrus (1844–1935), American politician
- Jerry Andrus (1918–2007), American magician
- John Emory Andrus (1841–1934), American politician
- Lou Andrus (born 1943), American football player
- Marc Handley Andrus (born 1956), American bishop
- Mark Andrus, American screenwriter
- Milo Andrus (1814–1893), American leader in The Church of Jesus Christ of Latter-day Saints
- Sedley Andrus (1915–2009), British officer of arms
- Shane Andrus (born 1980), American football placekicker
- Sherman Andrus, American gospel singer
- Wesley P. Andrus (1834–1898), American politician
- William Andrus (1806–1884), American politician
- William W. Andrus (1821–1910), American politician
- Wiman Andrus (1858–1935), Canadian baseball player

== See also ==
- Andreus (sometimes written "Andrus"), a figure from Greek mythology
