= Meie Maa =

Estonian newspaper

- Language: Estonian

Meie Maa is a newspaper published in Estonia.
