= Revalsche Post-Zeitung =

Estonian newspaper

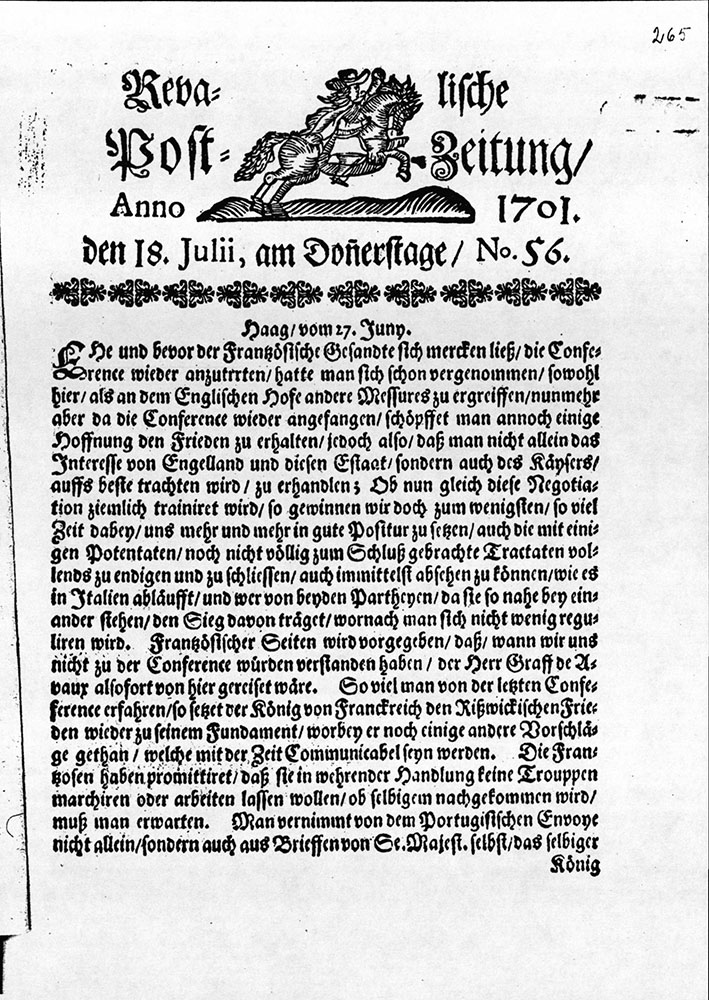
- The front page of the Revalische Post-Zeitung newspaper published in Tallinn, 18th of July 1701
- Founded: 1689
- Ceased publication: 1710
- Language: German
- Circulation: 2x per week

Revalsche Post-Zeitung was a German-language newspaper, which was published from 1689 to 1710 in Tallinn, Estonia. This was the first newspaper in Tallinn.

From 1699 and until 1710, the newspaper used the name "Revalische Post-Zeitung".

From 1697 and until 1707, the newspaper editor was the postmaster (Estonian: postimeister) Carl Philipp Grubb(e).

Out of about 2200 journals, 144 are preserved until today.
