= Dagens industri =

Swedish newspaper

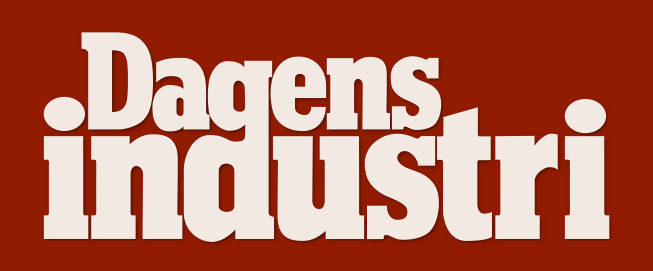
- Format: Tabloid
- Owner: Bonnier AB
- Editor-in-chief: Peter Fellman
- Managing editor: Jonas Jonsson
- Founded: 1976; 50 years ago
- Political alignment: Independent liberal-conservative
- Language: Swedish
- Headquarters: Stockholm, Sweden
- Circulation: 101,700 (2010)
- ISSN: 0346-640X
- Website: http://di.se/

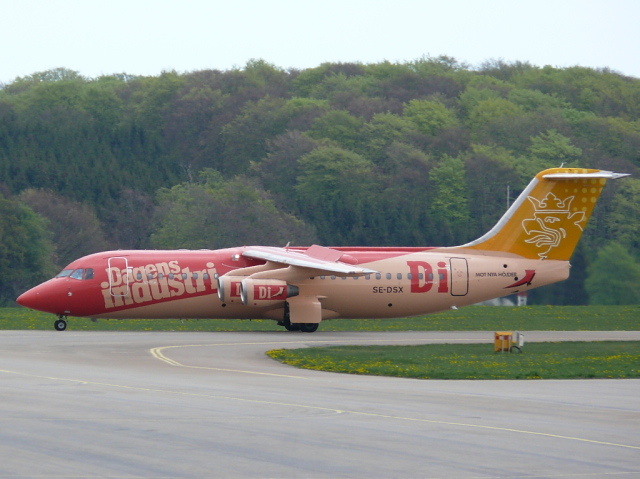
One of Malmö Aviation's Avro RJ100s in the special "Dagens Industri" livery.

Dagens industri (Di) is a financial newspaper in tabloid format published in Stockholm, Sweden.

== History and profile ==
Dagens industri was founded in 1976 with two issues per week. In 1983 it increased its periodicity to five issues per week and to six in 1990. It has since started affiliate newspapers in Austria, Estonia (Äripäev), Latvia (Dienas Bizness), Lithuania (Verslo žinios), Poland (Puls Biznesu), Russia (Delovoy Peterburg), Scotland and Slovenia (Poslovni dnevnik Finance). Dagens Industri is owned by the Swedish family-owned media group Bonnier AB and is published in tabloid format.

The stated position of the editorial page is independent liberal-conservative. The newspaper's online edition, di.se, has been voted as Sweden's "best economics online site" 20 years in a row between 1999 and 2019, in a competition held by the PR-firm Hallvarsson & Halvarsson.

In January 2016, former Managing Editor Lotta Edling succeeded Peter Fellman as the editor-in-chief of Dagens industri. Fellman returned as editor-in-chief in August 2018.

In 2022 the paper received criticism for its marketing methods by the Swedish consumer agency. Consumers have been targeted by affordable offers, which have later on changed into more expensive 12-month subscriptions without their approval or knowledge.

== Circulation ==
The 1983 circulation of Dagens industri was 30,000 copies. Its circulation was 100,000 copies in 2000. It was 115,000 copies in 2003. The paper had a circulation of 117,500 copies on weekdays in 2005. Its circulation was 101,700 copies in 2010.

According to the media survey Orvesto, Dagens industri had 328,000 daily readers of their printed issue during the beginning of 2017.

In March 2020, Dagens industri reached 100,000 paying subscribers, across the printed issue and online edition.
