= Saarte Hääl =

Estonian newspaper

- Type: Daily
- Publisher: TÜ Oma Saar
- Language: Estonian
- Website: www.saartehaal.ee

Saarte Hääl is a daily newspaper published in Saare County, Estonia. Prior to May 4, 2010, it was known as Oma Saar. The publisher of the newspaper is TÜ Oma Saar. Newspapers with the name Saarte Hääl were also published during the periods of 1940–1950 and 1988–1992.
