= Kaiu Parish =

Former municipality of Estonia

Coordinates: 59°0′49″N 25°3′29″E

Kaiu Parish Kaiu vald
- Former municipality of Estonia
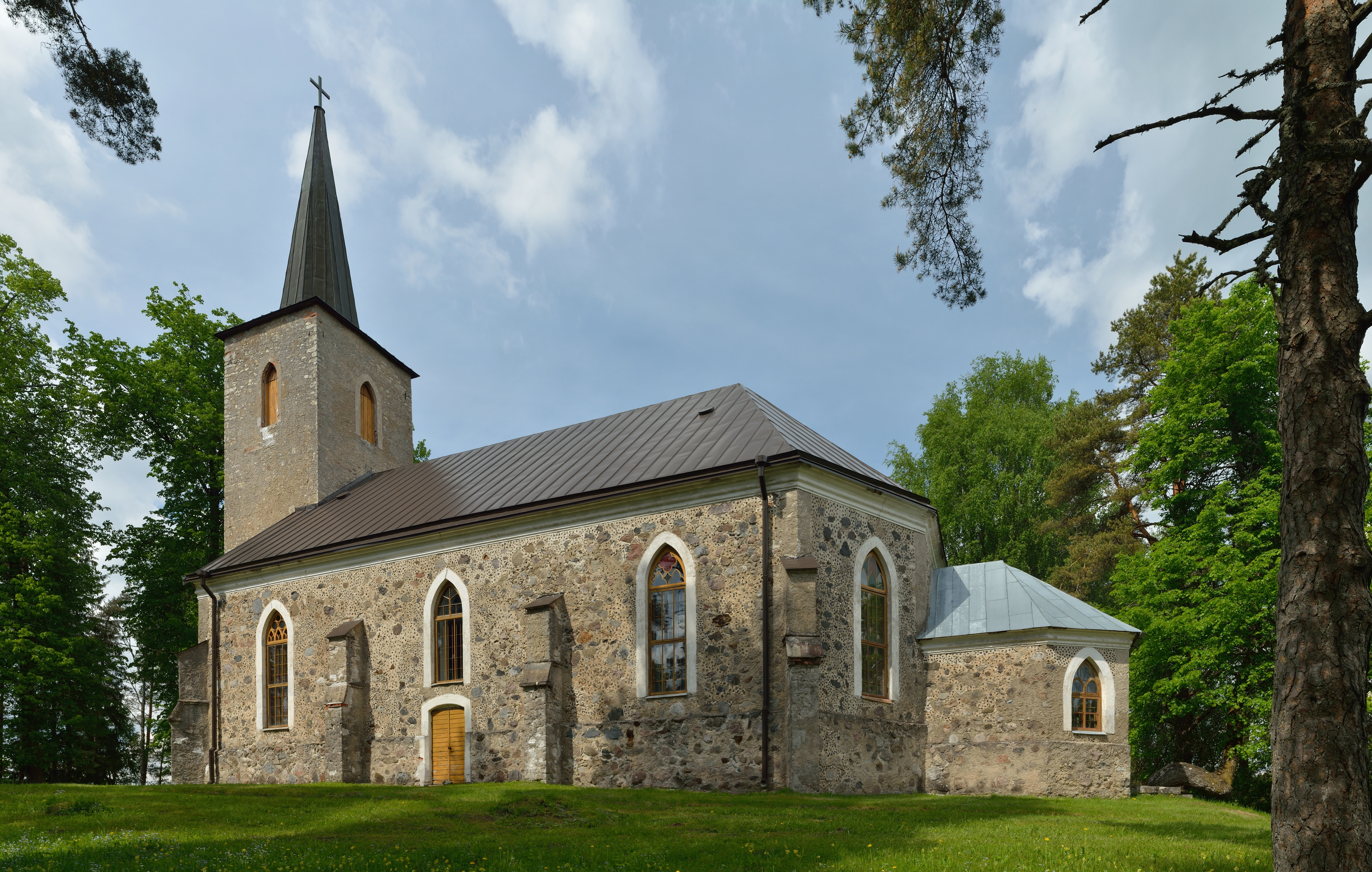
- Vahastu church

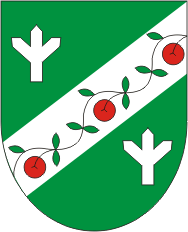
- Flag Coat of arms

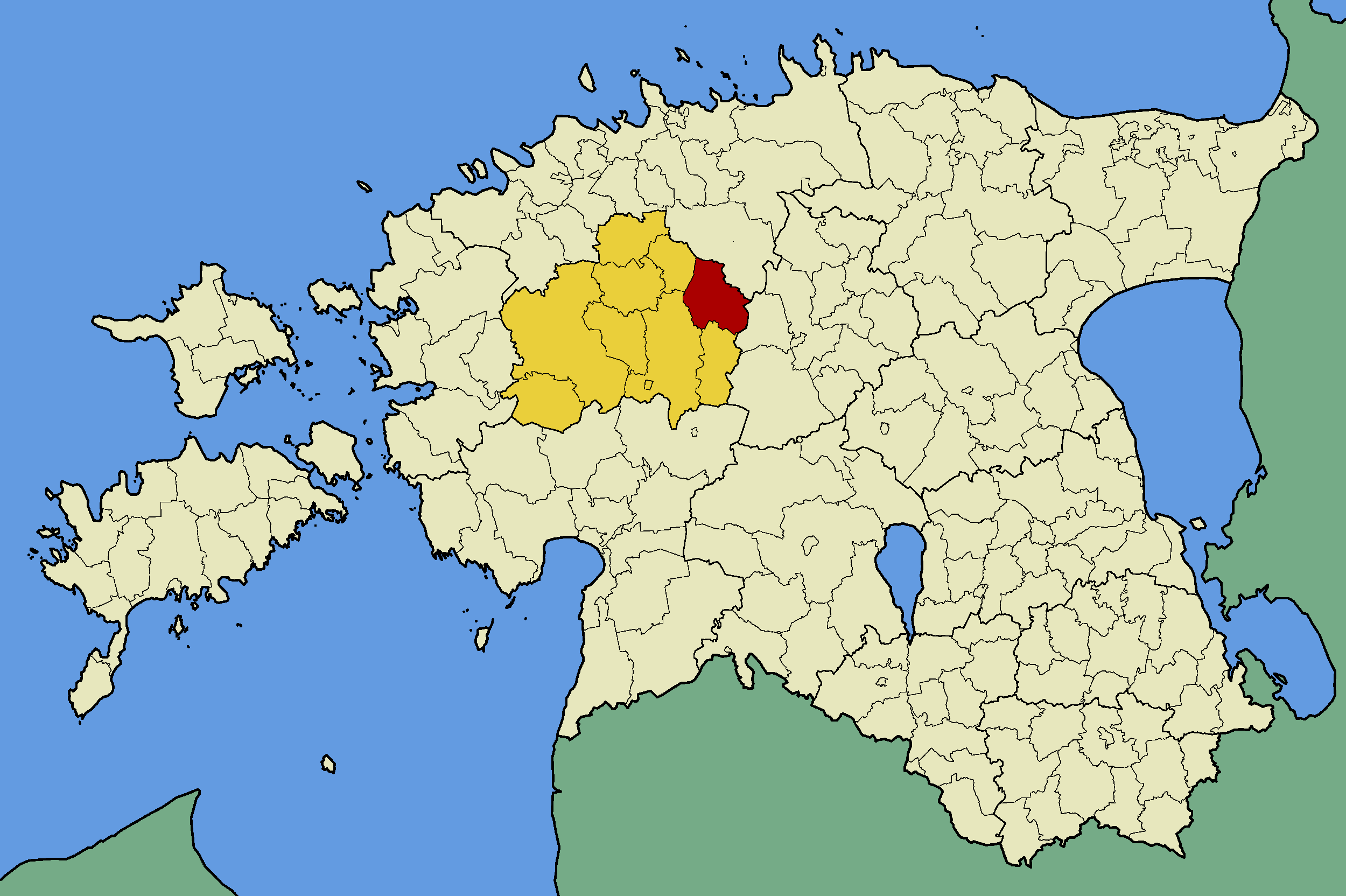
- Kaiu Parish within Rapla County.
- Country: Estonia
- County: Rapla County
- Administrative centre: Kaiu

Area
  - Total: 261 km^{2} (101 sq mi)

Population (2000)
  - Total: 1,700
  - Density: 6.5/km^{2} (17/sq mi)
- Website: www.kaiu.ee

Kaiu Parish (Estonian: Kaiu vald) was an Estonian municipality located in Rapla County. It had a population of 1,700 (as of 2000) and an area of 261 km^{2}.

In 2017, Kaiu Parish was merged into Rapla Parish.

== Settlements ==
Small borough

Kaiu

Villages

Kuimetsa - Karitsa - Kasvandu - Oblu - Põlliku - Suurekivi - Tamsi - Tolla - Toomja - Vahastu - Vana-Kaiu - Vaopere
