= Narva Postiljon =

Estonian newspaper

- Editor-in-chief: Sergei Stepanov
- Associate editor: Tanel Mazur
- Language: Estonian
- Sister newspapers: Eesti Päevaleht

Narva Postiljon is a weekly newspaper published in Narva, Estonia since 24. January 2004. It is published once a week, on Saturdays.
