= Andres Koort =

Estonian artist (born 1969)

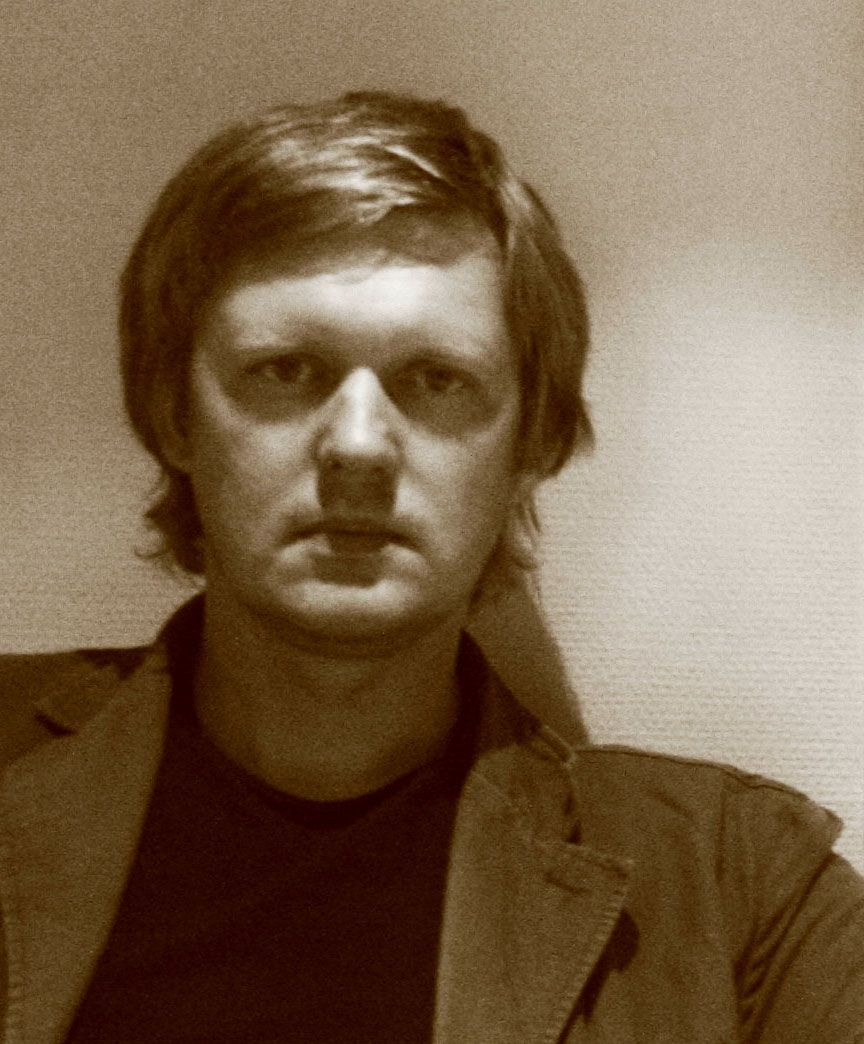
Andres Koort

Andres Koort (born 17 May 1969) is an Estonian painter, scenographer, exhibit designer and curator. He is a member of the Estonian Artists' Association and member of the board of the Estonian Painters' Association since 2002 and has curated and designed some EPA's exhibitions.

== Biography ==
Koort was born 17 May 1969 in Tallinn. He studied stage design and painting 1987–1993 in Estonian Academy of Art. Later he studied painting in Academie Minerva, Netherlands (1991). Andres Koort is a great-grandson of the sculptor Jaan Koort.

== Works ==
Andres Koort has been exhibiting his paintings since 1991, from 2002 he has designed stages for theatres Estonian Drama Theatre, Tallinn City Theatre, the Estonian Puppet Theatre, Theatrum (all in Tallinn) and Endla Theatre (in Pärnu). Tartu Art Museum and Lithuanian Art Museum have some Koort's works in their collections.

=== Personal exhibitions ===
- 2010 "Past continius" Tam gallery
- 2009 "Constantly" e-exhibition
- 2009 "Constantly" Draakoni gallery, Tallinn
- 2009 "Constantly" Estonian embassy, Moscow
- 2009 "Constantly" KU Gallery
- 2009 "The Field Was a Sea" Pärnu Town gallery
- 2008 "Constantly" Pärnu Endla theatre gallery
- 2001 "Synchronised" Tallinn City gallery
- 2000 "Horizon" Haapsalu town gallery
- 2000 "Up and Down" Raatuse gallery, Tallinn
- 1999 "Stridberg’s DNA" Pärnu Endla theatre gallery
- 1999 "Closer to the earth" Tallinn City gallery
- 1997 "Paintings" Sammas gallery, Tallinn
- 1995 "Seven Heads" Gallery Kauno Langas, Lithuania
- 1994 "Visitor" Estonian National Library, Tallinn
- 1993 "Aino" Tallinn's Mustpeade maja gallery
- 1991 "Deep" Gallery Illegaard, Tartu

=== Group exhibitions ===
- 2009 "Painted message vol.2" Tartu Art museum
- 2009 "Constantly Onetwo" Narva Art museum gallery
- 2009 "Freestyle" Võru town gallery
- 2008 "XL" EPA year exhibition, Tartu Art museum
- 2008 "PEA" Rakvere theatre gallery
- 2008 "Waking!" EML year exhibition, Rotermann Salt Storage, Tallinn
- 2008 "Crossing the line" EPA year exhibition, Narva Art museum gallery
- 2007 "the Right Choice" EPA year exhibition, Tartu Art Museum
- 2007 "Bland Painting" EPA year exhibition, Haapsalu town gallery
- 2006 "Free Willie!" EPA year exhibition, Vaal gallery, Tallinn
- 2006 "Beautiful paintings" EPA year exhibition, Aaspere mansion
- 2005 "in the United line" EPA year exhibition, Tartu Art museum
- 2005 "Hyper exhibition" Sakala 9, Tallinn
- 2004 "Three rooms, bathroom and a corridor" Sakala 9, Tallinn
- 2004 "P.E.A. sixth" Kärdla gallery
- 2003 "Painting paradise" EPA year exhibition, Gallery 008, Tallinn
- 2003 "Pause" gallery Arka, Vilnius, Lithuania
- 2003 "I’ve been to New York" EPA year exhibition, Pärnu Town gallery
- 2003 "Hiiu Sign" Kärdla Gallery
- 2002 "IN Graafika" Pärnu town gallery
- 2002 "Another Seascape" Palanga, Lithuania
- 2001 "Seaside Romanss" Palanga, Lithuania
- 2001 "Sidestep" Pärnu town gallery
- 2001 "P.E.A. Facade" Raatuse gallery, Tallinn
- 2001 "P.E.A." Haapsalu town gallery
- 1998 "Three squared" Pärnu town gallery
- 1992 Painting exhibition Tartu University Library
- 1992 Autumn exhibition Tallinn Arthall

=== Stage designs ===
- 1990 The Bourgeois Gentleman (Molière) Estonian Dramatheatre
- 1996 The Bitter Tears of Petra von Kant (R.W.Fassbinder) Tallinn City Theatre
- 1999 Hades (A. Strindberg) Pärnu theatre "Endla"
- 2000 Stairway to heaven Estonian Puppet theatre
- 2001 Vader (G.Görgey) Theatrum
- 2005 In front of the Jewelry store (K.Wojtyla) Theatrum
- 2007 Coctail Party (T.S.Eliot) Theatrum
- 2008 "The Tidings Brought to Mary" (P.Claudel) Theatrum

== Gallery ==
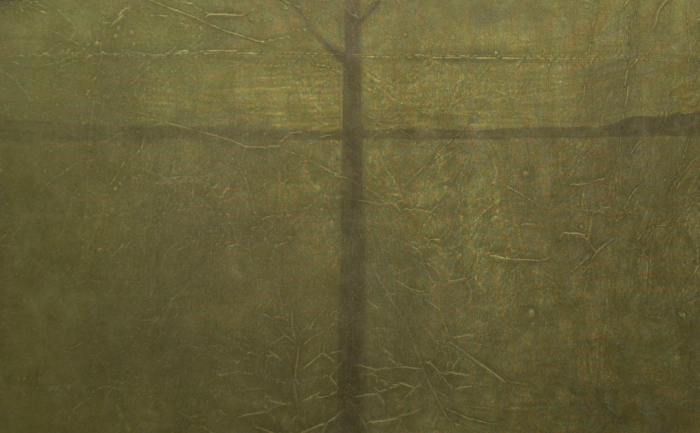
Põldpuu

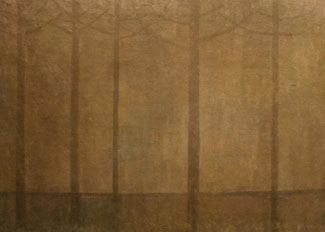
Koguaeg

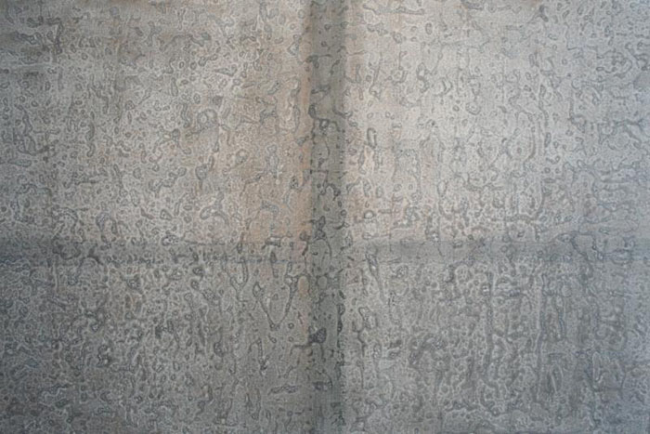
Koguaeg

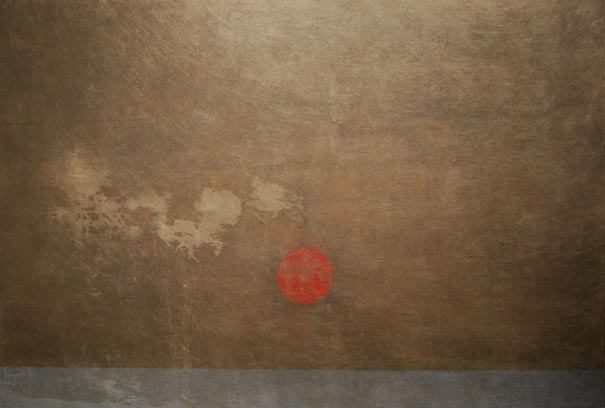
Ööpäike
