= Andres Kork =

Estonian surgeon and politician

Andres Kork (born 15 April 1950 in Tallinn) is an Estonian surgeon and politician. He was a member of X Riigikogu.

In 1992, he was the Estonian Health Minister. He has been a member of the party Res Publica.
