= Raplamaa Sõnumid =

Estonian newspaper

- Language: Estonian
- Headquarters: Rapla

Raplamaa Sõnumid (lit. 'Raplamaa Messages'; formerly Nädaline, lit. 'The weekly' until 2012) is a newspaper published in Rapla, Estonia.
