= Andres Marin =

Colombian ice climber

Personal information
- Born: 22 April 1983 (age 43) Ibagué, Colombia

Climbing career
- Type of climber: Ice climber

Andres Marin (born 22 April 1983) is a competitive ice climber. He was born in Ibagué, Colombia, and graduated from the Champagnat High School. He moved to the United States where he found his passion for climbing in all types of terrain. He has represented the United States in the Ice Climbing World Cup that takes place in Europe. He also is pursuing his guide certification through the American Mountain Guides Association.
