= Andres Unga =

Estonian diplomat

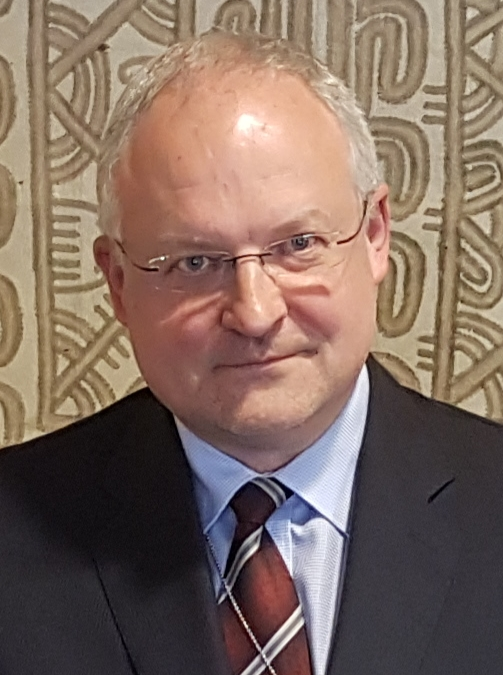
Andres Unga in 2016

Andres Unga (born 29 April 1966 in Viljandi) is an Estonian diplomat.

1996-2000, he was Ambassador of Estonia to Sweden.

In 2001, he was awarded with Order of the National Coat of Arms, V class.
