= Narva Kirik =

Estonian newspaper

- Owner: Lutheran congregation in Narva
- Founded: 2002
- Ceased publication: Bankruptcy on April 17, 2015
- Language: Estonian
- Headquarters: Vabaduse 20

Narva Kirik is a newspaper published in Narva, Estonia.
