= Andres Keevallik =

Estonian scientist in mechanics (born 1943)

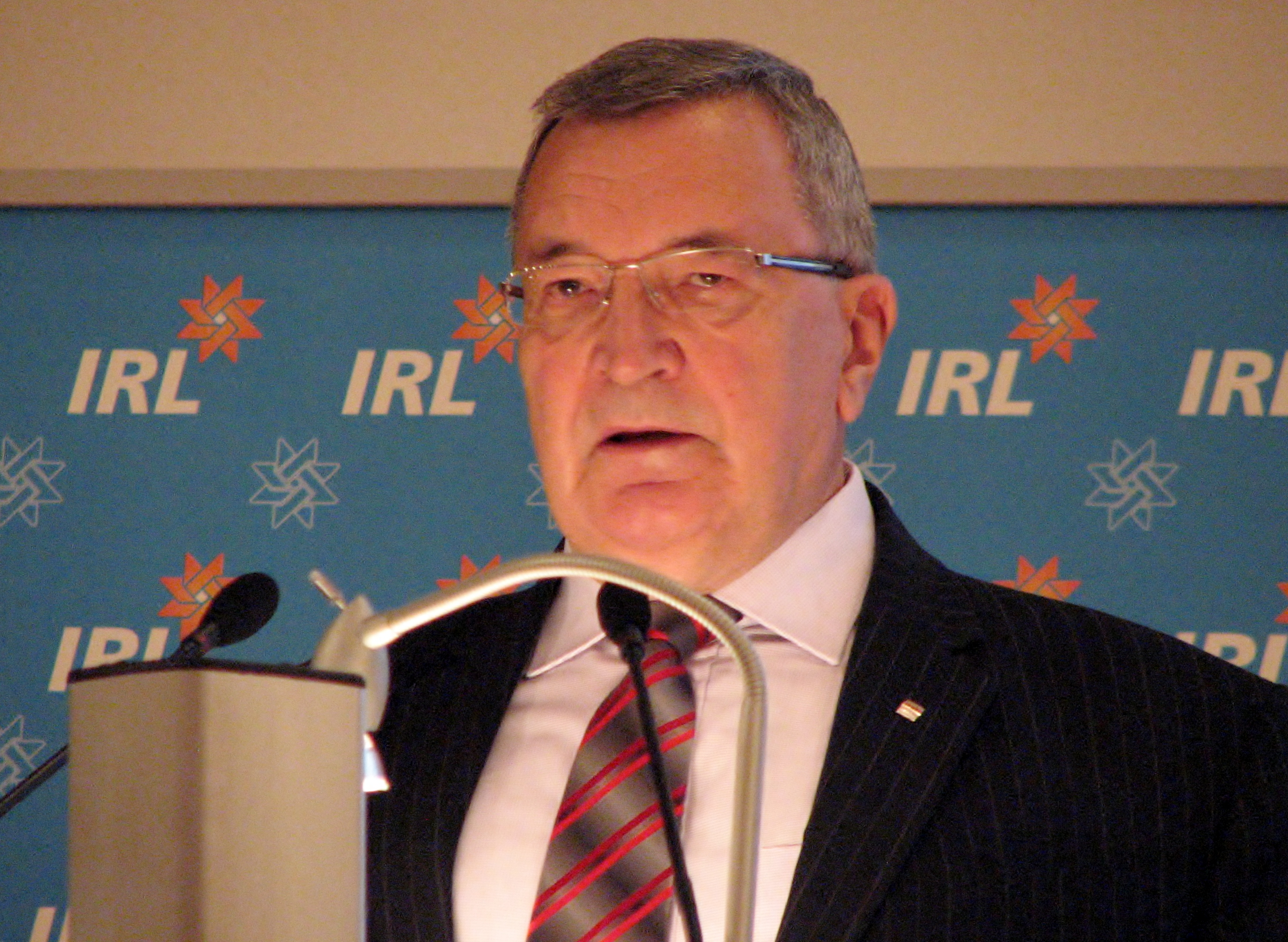
Andres Keevallik in 2012

Andres Keevallik (born 24 February 1943 in Pärnu) is an Estonian computer scientist.

In 1966, he graduated from Tallinn Polytechnical Institute in computer science (cum laude). Since 1974, he is candidate of engineering (PhD).

He has worked at Tallinn Polytechnical Institute (now Tallinn University of Technology) as engineer, assistant professor and associate professor, since 1992 as professor of digital techniques.

2000-2005 and 2010–2015, he was the rector of Tallinn University of Technology. Since 2016 he is Rector Emeritus of TUT.

In 2003, he was awarded with Order of the White Star, III class.
