= KesKus =

Estonian newspaper

- Founded: 1999
- Language: Estonian
- Headquarters: Tallinn

KesKus is a newspaper published in Estonia. The newspaper has been produced since 1999. The editor in chief is Juku-Kalle Raid.
