= Verslo žinios =

Lithuanian business newspaper

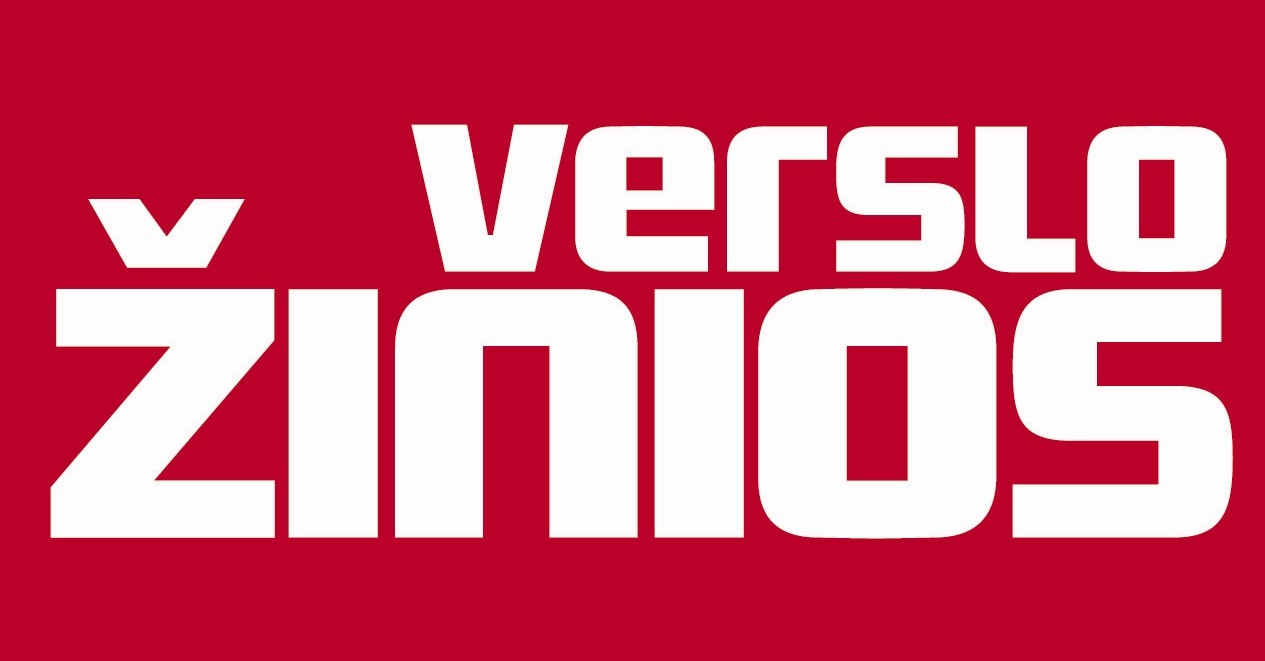
- Owner(s): Bonnier Business Press (80%); Rolandas Barysas (20%)
- Founder: Rolandas Barysas
- Editor-in-chief: Rolandas Barysas
- General manager: Ugnius Jankauskas
- Founded: 1995; 31 years ago
- Headquarters: Vilnius
- Country: Lithuania
- Website: www.vz.lt

Verslo žinios (English: Business News) is a leading Lithuanian business newspaper and internet portal published in Vilnius since 1995 and online since 2000. Swedish Bonnier Business Press group holds an 80% stake in Verslo žinios. The remaining owner is newspaper's founder and editor-in-chief Rolandas Barysas.

The newspaper and website VZ.lt is published by UAB "Verslo žinios" which also publishes magazine Verslo klasė, since 2003 organizes conferences, of which the best known are "Gazelė", "Password", "Best internet", Baltic Real Estate Forum, Investo's Festival, among others, owns database websites Rekvizitai, Mano Pinigai and a legal database Infolex.

In 2024, its employment website cv.lt was bought by the Baltic branch of Ringier Axel Springer Media AG.

As of February 2023, there were 102 employees working for the company. It has a journalism, data intelligence, telemarketing, advertising, IT and subscriptions divisions.
