= Äripäev =

Estonian newspaper

Coordinates: 59°25′1.15″N 24°44′29.32″E

- Type: Daily
- Format: Berliner
- Owner: Bonnier Group
- Publisher: AS Äripäev
- Editor-in-chief: Meelis Mandel
- Managing editor: Igor Rõtov
- Founded: 1989
- Ceased publication: 22 December 2022 (print)
- Language: Estonian
- Headquarters: Tallinn, Estonia
- ISSN: 1406-2585
- Website: www.aripaev.ee

Äripäev (Estonian for "Business Day") is an Estonian financial newspaper in tabloid format. It was founded in 1989 by Dagens Industri, a leading Swedish financial newspaper. The first issue of Äripäev was published on 9 October 1989. Until May 1992 Äripäev was published once a week, and until February 1996 three times a week. Since 1996 Äripäev has been published five times a week. The paper ceased publications in 22 December 2022 and transition to online.

The newspaper belongs to AS Äripäev, which is owned by the Swedish family-owned media group Bonnier.

The English-language section is called Baltic Business News (BBN). This section is produced in cooperation by three business newspapers from the Baltic states: Äripäev (Estonia), Dienas Bizness (Latvia), and Verslo žinios (Lithuania).
