= Kesknädal =

Estonian newspaper

Coordinates: 59°26′16.32″N 24°44′28.2″E

Kesknädal (Estonian for 'Midweek') is a weekly newspaper issued every Wednesday. The paper was started in 1999. It is the organ of the Centre Party, a left-leaning Estonian party.

The paper has been criticized for hiring notable Soviet-era journalists such as Ralf R. Parve, and sometimes accused of harbouring Soviet-like journalistic culture.
