= Linnaleht =

Estonian- and Russian-language daily newspaper

Linnaleht (City Paper) was a free independent Estonian daily newspaper, first published in Tallinn in 2005. The paper appeared four times a week in Tallinn both in Estonian and Russian and once a week in Tartu and Pärnu. The daily paper ceased publication in December 2008. It was restarted as a semi-weekly newspaper in January 2009. The last issue released on 29 October 2021.
