= Sõnumileht =

Estonian newspaper

Sõnumileht was an Estonian tabloid newspaper between 1995 and 2000. The newspaper was published in Estonian, and it was one of the country's most popular tabloid-style productions. The newspaper was originally founded and owned by Thomas Leito. It was first published in 1995. At first it was a quality newspaper. In 1998, after the Norwegian media group Schibsted purchased a stake, it moved to being a tabloid. In 1999, Sõnumileht had a daily circulation of around 30,000, making it Estonia's sixth-largest circulation at the time.

Sõnumileht maintained a serious press imago until 1998 while being run by editor-in-chief Mark Luik. Under the pressure of new owners, it turned to yellow media in October 1998 with a successful launch campaign. Around the same time Mart Luik resigned, the new editor-in-chief was the 25-year-old sports journalist Urmo Soonvald.

It was in competition with Estonia's other tabloid newspaper Õhtuleht and in the summer of 1999 this led to a price war between the two newspapers. One result of this was that tabloid newspapers became very popular with Estonians and the circulation of both newspapers increased.

On 3 July 2000, the two rival newspapers merged to form SL Õhtuleht.
