= Andres Kollist =

Estonian chemist and politician

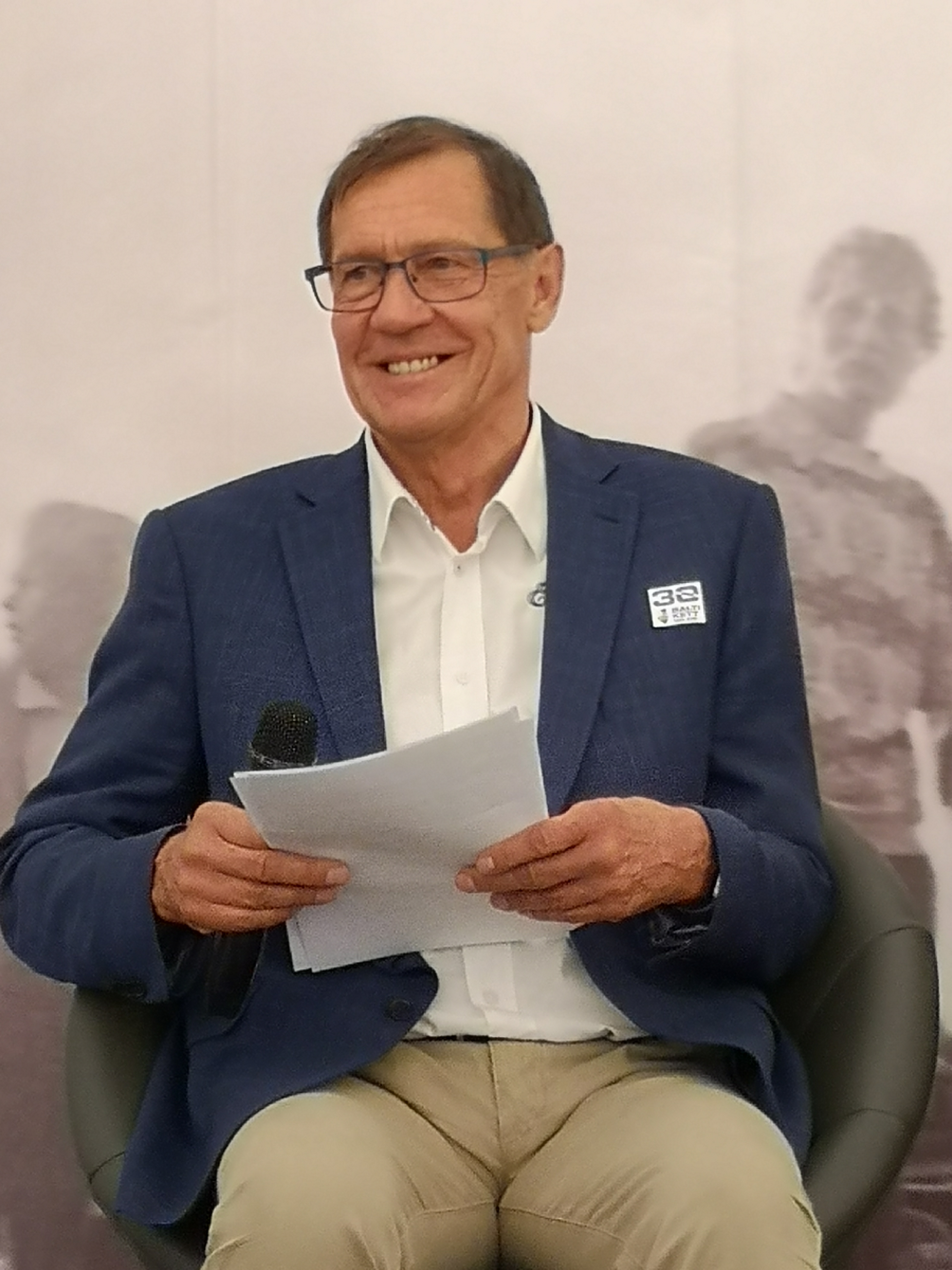
- Born: January 30, 1948 (age 78); Tartu, then part of Estonian SSR, Soviet Union
- Education: Tartu State University
- Known for: Research on polygalactanes in red algae
- Awards: Order of the White Star, V class (2001)
- Scientific career
- Fields: Chemistry
- Workplaces: Estonian Academy of Sciences; Tallinn University

Andres Kollist (born 30 January 1948 in Tartu) is an Estonian chemist, librarian, politician and activist.

In 1971 he graduated from Tartu State University in chemistry. After graduating he worked at Estonian SSR Academy of Sciences.

His main field of research has been polygalactanes in red algae.

1989-1993 and since 2008 he is a member of Tallinn City Council. 1995-2000 he was the CEO of Citizenship and Migration Board. 2000-2001 he was the rector of Audentes Higher Business School (Estonian: Audentese Kõrgem Ärikool). Since 2004 he is the head of Tallinn University Academic Library.

Awards:

- 2001: Order of the White Star, V class.

== Works ==
- A. Kollist, M. Vaher, J. Paris, T. Püssa. Characterization and utilization of polysaccharides isolated from agar-containing algae. 4. The effect of concentration, determining temperature and storage time on the gel strength of some agars. – Eesti NSV Teaduste Akadeemia Toimetised. Keemia, 29, 1980
- A. Kollist, M. Vaher, K. Truus, J. Paris, T. Püssa. Characterization and utilization of polysaccharides isolated from agar-containing algae. – Tokyo, 1989
- R. Tuvikene, K. Truus, M. Robal, O. Volobujeva, E. Mellikov, T. Pehk, A. Kollist, K. Tiiu, M. Vaher. The extraction, structure, and gelling properties of hybrid galactan from the red alga Furcellaria lumbricalis (Baltic Sea, Estonia). – Journal of Applied Phycology 2010, 22(1)
- K-R. Kont, A. Kollist, S. Jantson. Financing of Estonian Research Libraries: The Happy Days and the Economic Crisis. – Slavic and East European Information Resources 2012, 13(1)
