= Mass media in Latvia =

Latvia is one of the three Baltic states having regained independence in 1991 and since 2004 is a member State of the European Union. After its independence there have been fundamental changes of political, economic and social nature that have turned Latvia into a democratic country with a free market economy. This reflects on the mass media landscape which is considered well-developed despite being subjected to a limited market and a linguistic and cultural split between Latvian (58.2%) and Russian speakers (37.5%). In 2017 Freedom House defined Latvia's press freedom status as “free", assigning to the country's press freedom a score of 26/100 (with 1 corresponding to the most free status). The 2017 World Press Freedom Index prepared annually by Reporters Without Borders (RSF) states that media in Latvia have a "two-speed freedom", underlying different levels of freedom for Latvian-language and Russian-language media. According to RSF's Index the country is ranked 28th among 180 countries.

== Media outlets ==
=== Print and online media ===
Despite being traditionally held in high regard among Latvians, print media have been losing ground in recent years. This is partly due to a global trend which sees the emergence of online news outlets and new ways of media consumption, combined with a decrease in the population. On the other hand, the consumption of newspapers is also falling among the senior population, which is probably influenced by the cost of an annual subscription, around €100. All national dailies have suffered dramatic losses in audience figures since 2006. Between 2007 and 2013 the annual circulation of overall newspapers fell by 60 percent, while for newspapers in the Latvian-language it fell by 47 percent. In the same period the circulation of periodicals were reduced by of one fifth.

There are three major Latvian-language dailies, Diena (published by Dienas Mediji), the high quality paper Latvijas Avīze (Lauku Avīze) and Neatkarīgā Rīta Avīze (Mediju Nams), and one business daily, Dienas Bizness. In 2012 three Russian-language dailies (Vesti segodnya, Chas, Telegraf) have been absorbed by a single owner. Today Vesti Segodnya (Media Nams Vesti) and MK-Latvia are, respectively, the only remaining print daily newspaper and weekly published in the Russian-language.

The publishers of Latvian daily Diena have managed to bring down its losses from more than half a million euros to tens of thousands of euros. Latvian local media outlets are in a difficult financial situation since 2016, mostly due to a general decrease in subscription rates and advertising revenue. As a consequence, a number of newspapers closed, while others had to reduce their publication frequency. On the other hand, the informational void created by this situation has been filled with municipality-owned newspapers, criticised for their politically driven and reality-distorting contents.

The one media category that has been constantly increasing its audience is digital media. The number of Internet portal visitors has been steadily growing starting from the late 1990s and 2000s. This trend is especially true for TV3, a TV channel present in all three of the Baltic States, which saw a significant rise in the number of visitors of its website. Ekspress Grupp’s Delfi is the most visited website in all three Baltic countries. Eesti Media owns Tvnet.lv, the second most popular news website in Latvia, as well as Estonia's Postimees and Lithuania's 15min.lt. The largest news portals like have Delfi and Tvnet.lv have more than 15 years of experience with editorial offices that can compete with the news desks of traditional media. The public service media portal Public Broadcasting of Latvia began operating at the beginning of 2013 in the Latvian language. Russian and English-language versions were added later.

According to the market, society and media research company TNS Latvia, Latvian newspapers are read by 17% of the population on a daily basis, 48% read the press twice or three times a week, while 72% of the population use the Internet regularly and 37% of Internet users read news sites every day.

=== Television and radio ===
Among the three Baltic States, Latvia was the first one to have its own television channel back in 1954. The first private TV station of the country started to air in 1991 and today television is the leading media in Latvia. In 2016 the average television viewer spent 4 hours and 48 minutes in front of the screen each day – 22 minutes less than in 2015. The country has two public service channels, Latvijas Televīzija (LTV1) and LTV 7. In 2016 LTV1 was the second most watched TV station after the commercial channel TV3 (owned by Swedish Modern Times Group, MTG), that accounted for an 11 percent share. These stations were followed by PBK; NTV Mir Baltic; LNT, Rossiya RTR; Ren TV Baltic (Baltic variants of Russian networks) and 3+ (Russian-language channel owned by MTG and airing from the United Kingdom). Private channels Re:TV, Riga TV 24 and Sportacentrs.com, with the two public service channels LTV and LTV7, are the five free-to-air-channels of Latvia. Following the example of Estonia, Latvia too is preparing to launch a national television channel in Russian language, as a response to the Russian media influence in the country.

Radio over the years has proven to be the most stable of the media businesses in terms of audiences and revenues, although during 2015, Latvia's public radio broadcasting company Latvijas Radio suffered severe losses. In recent years local and regional television stations have gained financial stability, largely due to national support. The content they generate is available on local cable networks, as well as on the Re:TV channel, which has for three years enjoyed the right of free-to-air national broadcasting as granted by the National Electronic Mass Media Council (NEMMC), the broadcasting regulator.

== Legal framework ==
The Constitution of Latvia regulates freedom of speech and the press. Law on the Press and Other Mass Media, Electronic Media Law (emended in 2014) represent the other sources within which media operate. However the Constitution does not clearly define restrictions on freedom of expression. In 2016 the Criminal Law was amended in regards to the limits to disseminate "State secret", thus creating a wide debate on the right of journalists to publish leaked documents. Defamation through mass media is another issue concerning media freedom. According to the article n. 157 of Criminal Law defamation in press is punishable through short-term imprisonment or fine.

The Law on Freedom of Information provides detailed rules on access to public information, and government agencies have adopted a number of practices in recent years to improve transparency, including publishing legislation and other official documents online.

On 8 November 2016 the government adopted Latvia's Media Policy Guidelines for 2016–2020 and the accompanying action plan. These are the first media policy planning documents in Latvia. The media authority in Latvia is The National Electronic Mass Media Council (NEMMC), but the body regulates only the public service media (PSM) and the commercial broadcasting. The media authority has the right to impose sanctions on these media organizations. Although the NEMMC holds the right to regulate plurality of media ownership through the distribution of the licenses to commercial broadcasting services, there is no regulation in terms of giving up licenses/activities in other media sectors, nor the obligation to allocate windows for third-party programming, or of divestiture. The commercial media do have self-regulatory mechanisms (both codes of ethics or conduct and monitoring systems) but their effectiveness is put into question in cases of non-compliance with the rules.

== Censorship and media freedom ==
In 2017 Latvia has been ranked 28th out of 180 countries by Reporters Without Borders (RSF). The media watchdog compiled the index using factors like media independence, self-censure, rule of law, transparency and violations to determine the level of press freedom. On the other hand, the USA based NGO, Freedom House, assigned Latvia's press freedom a score of 26/100 (with 1 corresponding to the most free status).

In 2014 The National Electronic Mass Media Council has made a unanimous decision to restrict the broadcasting of Rossiya RTR television in Latvia, a channel produced by a Russian state-owned media company, because it “concluded that RTR news reports contain unjustifiable calls to war or a military conflict and increase ethnic hate”. Authorities also reproached other Russian-language outlets about their content throughout the year. On the other hand, media authority NEMMC has often been targeted with accusations of being politicised, due to the fact that the Parliament appoints its members.

In 2016 a journalist of the investigative news broadcast "Aizliegtais paņēmiens" has been investigated in a criminal proceeding on the basis of Section 145 of the Latvian Criminal Law Code: "illegal activities with the personal data of a natural person, if substantial harm is caused thereby". However, the criminal procedure was concluded in summer 2016 without finding evidence that any crime had occurred. The episode was strongly criticized by the Latvian Association of Journalists because it has been seen as an interference to the professional activity of the journalist, and violated the protection and confidentiality of sources.

As for the influence of politics in the media there seem to be differences between television/radio broadcasting and newspapers. No TV or radio station is owned by politically affiliated entities. On the other hand, according to data disclosed by journalists, almost 60% of the national and regional newspapers of the Baltic country are owned by politically affiliated entities. Latvian media also reported that several people who participated in the latest municipal elections were closely associated with the media environment.

In several occasions, journalists have faced pressure from authorities to reveal sources in cases of potential libel or for publishing state information.

Finally, in recent years there have also been numerous debates on the rights of local governments to publish their newsletters with editorial content and paid advertisements. While the local governments affirm that their aim is to inform their municipalities, media workers claim that this has a negative impact on competition and media independence. The Latvian Law on Press and Other Media is vague on the matter. Although it is stipulated that the editor of the mass medium must be editorially independent, the law also provides that any natural or legal entity may be the publisher of a newspaper. Therefore, there are no formal violations of the law.

== Media ownership ==
In Latvia, there are no binding rules on publishing ownership structures or reporting any changes in the media ownership structure. Although media companies are asked to provide legal information about the owners to the Register of Enterprises, this does not ensure transparency on the legal or natural person owning or managing a media company, thus not every media owner is known. Also for the horizontal concentration and cross-media ownership, there are no laws offering specific thresholds and limits. The Media Pluralism Monitor 2015 for Latvia shows a high risk for concentration of media ownership, and a medium risk on regards to the concentration of cross-media ownership and to transparency of media ownership.

Postimees Group (formerly known as Eesti Meedia until 2019) and Ekspress Grupp, both based in Estonia, are the major media companies operating in the country. Postimees Group is owned by Margus Linnamäe, known as the country’s pharma king. Compared to the rival Ekspress Grupp, Postimees Group owns a larger number of assets across different media categories – newspapers, TV and radio stations in Estonia, online websites in Latvia and Estonia, including an advertising network. In 2014, what was known back then as Eesti Meedia bought the pan-Baltic news agency Baltic News Service (BNS), while UP Invest, an investment holding company owned by Linnamäe, acquired Latvia's biggest news agency LETA, which holds 70% of the market.

== See also ==
- Baltic News Network BNN
