= Allan Martinson =

Estonian businessman

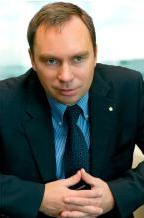
- Allan Martinson (2000)
- Born: 8 October 1966 (age 59); Tartu, Estonia
- Education: Moscow State University (1991)
- Awards: Legion of Honour (2001); Order of the White Star (2013)

Allan Martinson (born 1966) is an Estonian technology entrepreneur and investor. He has been a co-founder or executive at several technology and media companies, including Starship Technologies, a company building robotic platforms for last-mile delivery,; Xolo, a company serving the global freelancer community; and MTVP, a tech investment company.

== Biography ==
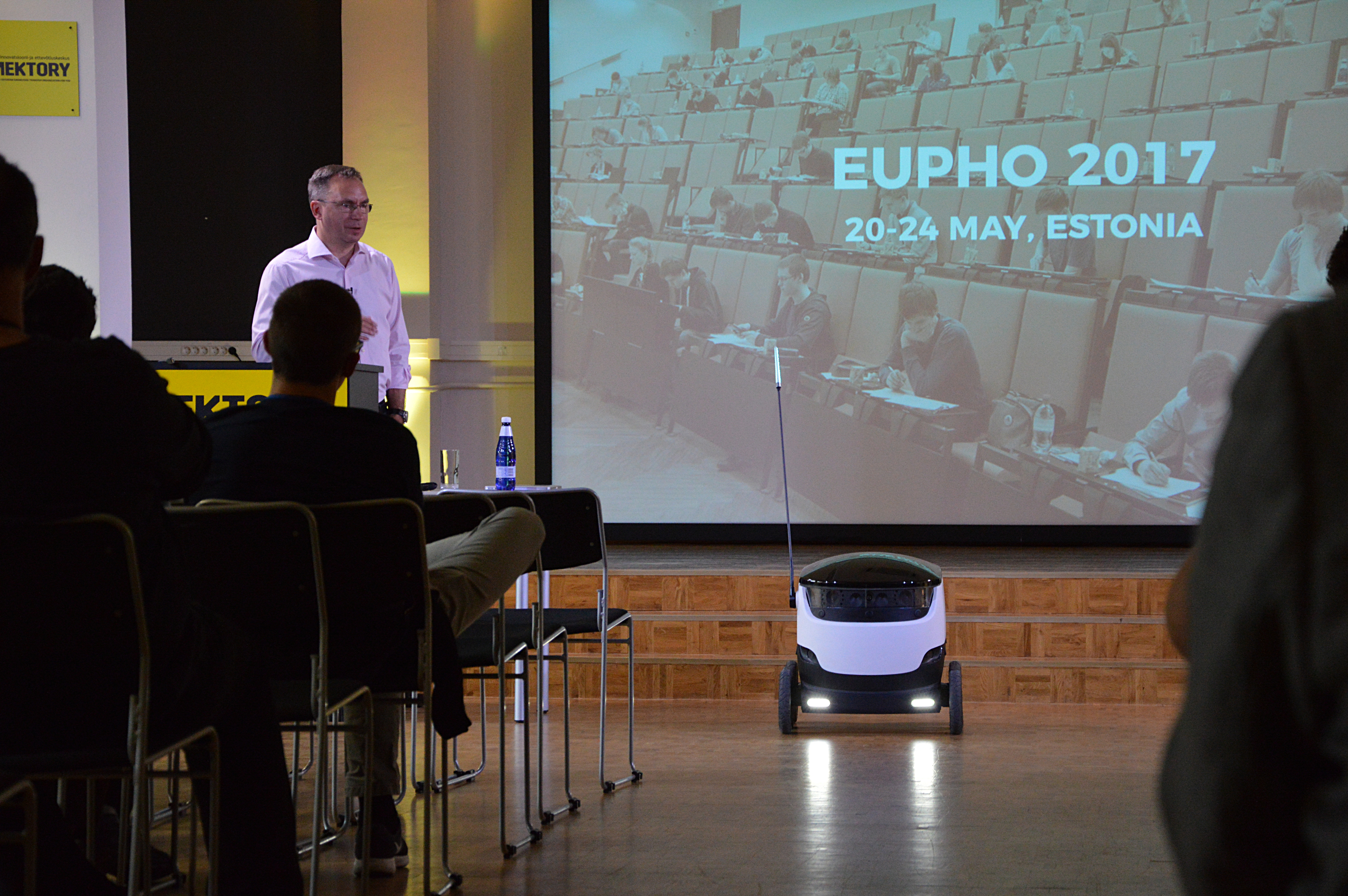
Allan Martinson with Starship Technologies robot in European Physics Olympiad (2017)

Martinson graduated from the faculty MSU CMC (1991). He was the founder and CEO of Baltic News Service, a leading news agency in the Baltic states of Estonia, Latvia and Lithuania. Launched in 1990 as a startup by Estonian students in Moscow, it quickly grew into a leading regional news organization with almost 200 employees. In 1994, BNS received investments from Dow Jones Telerate, and Swedish Bonnier media group. In 2001, the company was sold to Finnish Alma Media.

In 1998, Martinson became the CEO of MicroLink, the leading IT and technology holding in the Baltics. Launched as Estonia's leading PC assembler, it had diversified into systems integration and internet access services. Martinson launched an aggressive expansion strategy of Microlink, which was funded by four rounds of private equity placements from Baltic Investments Fund, Baltic Republics Fund, et al. The company merged with or acquired 15 other companies in 1998-2000, such as Estonia's No 2 IT company Astrodata, Latvia's IT market leaders Fortech and VAR, 7 internet service providers (ISPs) in all three countries, etc. The company became the Baltics' leading IT services and systems integration group with annual sales of 60 m EUR and almost 600 employees. In 2005, MicroLink's IT service operations were sold in a trade sale transaction to three Baltic incumbent telecoms.

MicroLink was also a parent of two highly successful startups. In 1999, it launched Delfi, the leading Baltic new media enterprise, which was subsequently sold to Norwegian Findexa in January 2004. Delfi still maintains the leading position in the Baltic new media market and collects over half of the internet advertising revenue in the region.

MicroLink was also the parent of SAF Tehnika – the fastest-growing developer of microwave radio links for the global mobile telecom sector. SAF Tehnika carried out a successful IPO in May 2004, became the only listed Baltic technology stock and reached a valuation of 70 m EUR.

In 2004, Martinson teamed up with the leading Baltic investment bank Trigon Capital and launched a technology investment company "Martinson Trigon Venture Partners" (MTVP). He bought out Trigon and became the sole owner of MTVP in 2008. The company invested 20 m USD into nine companies: Russian software engineering company Reksoft, Russian computer games publisher "Novyi Disk", cloud-to-desktop technology company "InvisibleCRM", Finnish casual games company Playforia, next-generation online dating company "Flirtic", Lithuanian data center operator "Hostex", data communications operator MicroLink Lithuania, MTV franchise MTV Baltics.

Martinson was one of the investors in Cherry Media, a Baltic daily deals industry leader.

Martinson is a member of the supervisory boards of location-based solutions provider company Regio (Reach-U). In the past, he has also served as a board member of Tallinn Stock Exchange (NASDAQ-OMX Tallinn), the largest Baltic cable operator Starman, pan-CEE online recruiter CV Keskus, PR agency Hill&Knowlton Baltics, ERP integrator Columbus IT Partner Estonia, Estonian ICT association ITL, Look@World Foundation, and the Estonian Academy of Arts.

Martinson was nominated for Estonia's Businessman of the Year in 2000.

Martinson is a member of Rotary International (Tallinn Old Town Rotary Club). He is a Chevalier of the French Order of Honour and has been decorated by Estonia's White Star Order.
