= ELTA =

Lithuanian news agency

Naujienų agentūra ELTA
- Industry: News agency
- Founded: 8 March 1920
- Founder: Juozas Eretas
- Headquarters: Vilnius, Lithuania
- Key people: Viktorija Forosenko (director); Gailė Jaruševičiūtė-Mockuvienė (editor-in-chief)
- Revenue: 1 202 397 € (2025)
- Owner: UAB Delfi
- Parent: Ekspress Grupp
- Website: www.elta.lt

ELTA is a Lithuanian news agency based in Vilnius, Lithuania. In a day, it receives about 5,000 news articles and produces about 300 articles in Lithuanian, with translations to English and Russian. ELTA cooperates with foreign news agencies such as Reuters, Associated Press, Deutsche Presse-Agentur, Polish Press Agency and others.

== History ==
=== Interwar ===
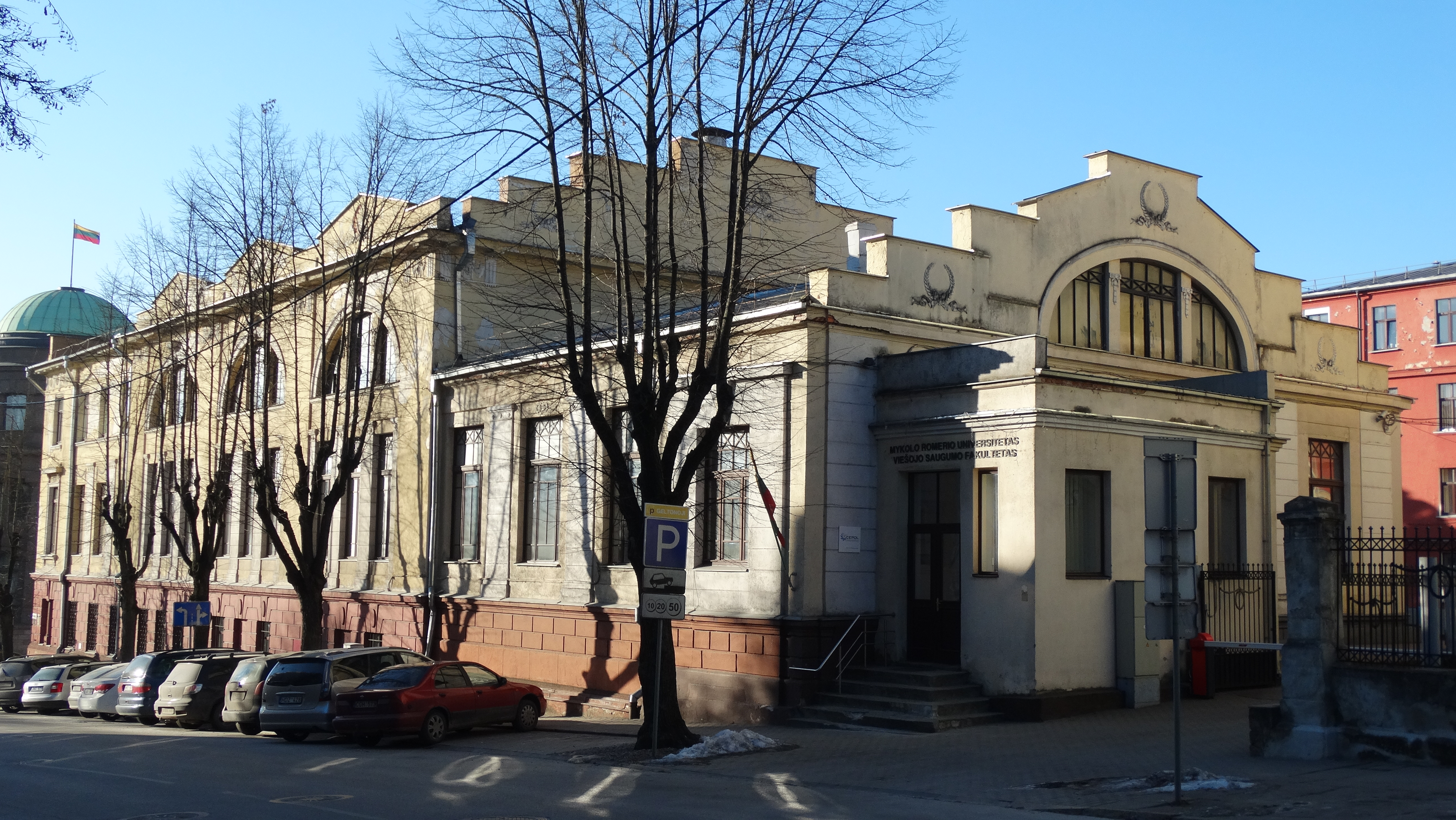
The building in Kaunas where the telegram agency ELTA was founded in 1920.

ELTA was founded in March 1920 in Kaunas, the temporary capital of Lithuania, by Juozas Eretas, the first director of the agency, a literature professor, publicist, and public figure of Swiss descent.

ELTA was founded based on Lithuanian press bureaus that were established in Switzerland, Denmark, France, Sweden, Germany during World War I. The agency was owned by the Ministry of Foreign Affairs.

Between 1920 and 1940, ELTA cooperated closely with the most prominent foreign agencies – its five teleprinters used to send news from Reuters (UK), DNB (Germany), Havas (France), Stefani (Italy) and TASS (Soviet Union). ELTA also employed correspondents in Berlin and Moscow.

=== Soviet occupation ===
When Soviet troops occupied Lithuania in 1940, ELTA was incorporated into TASS and relayed news from Moscow. Lithuanians who escaped the Soviet occupation established a free ELTA Information Bureau in Berlin in 1944, headed by Antanas Valiukėnas. The Supreme Committee for the Liberation of Lithuania (VLIK) published various ELTA bulletins in Lithuanian, German, Italian, English, Spanish and Portuguese.

From 1953, a bulletin in German called ELTA-Pressedienst began to be published in Reutlingen; from 1954 – in Italian in Rome called ELTA Press; from 1956 – in New York in English called ELTA Information Service; from 1961 – in Buenos Aires in Spanish.

In 1965, the agency's Information Service, led by the VLIK and supported by the National Fund, was moved from Germany to the United States of America, with branches remaining in Munich and Rome. Agency bulletins were published periodically in Lithuanian, English, Italian and German, and aperiodically in Spanish, Portuguese, and French in Brazil, Italy, France, Venezuela, West Germany, and the United States.

=== Post-1990 ===
When Lithuania restored independence in 1990, ELTA also re-established its independence from TASS and its direct contacts with the leading global agencies. In 1996, ELTA was partially sold by the government of Lithuania (the law required the government to retain at least 35% of the shares). In 2003, MG Baltic owned 50.86% and Achema Group owned 6.75% of the shares. Companies controlled by Vitas Tomkus, publisher of the daily Respublika, acquired about 60% of ELTA in 2005. In 2006, Algirdas Pilvelis, publisher of the daily Lietuvos aidas, acquired 39.51% of shares that were owned by the government.

In August 2017, Gitana Markovičienė announced plans to purchase the controlling stake in ELTA and became the new CEO. The deal for the purchase of 80% of the shares closed in February 2018. GM Media Invest, owned by Markovičienė, acquired the remaining 20% of shares in January 2020 to become the sole owner of ELTA.

In 2022, Delfi news portals owned by the Estonian AS Ekspress Grupp bought all ELTA shares. According to Ekspress Grupp's 2023 annual report, the acquisition of ELTA (along with news portal Lrytas) contributed significantly to the company's revenue growth, with 72 employees transferred from the acquired companies.

== Directors ==
ELTA directors were:

- Juozas Eretas (1920–1922)
- Matas Šalčius (1922–1923)
- Mikas Bagdonas (1923)
- Magdalena Avietėnaitė (1924–1926)
- Justas Paleckis (1926–1927)
- Antanas Jakobas (1927–1928)
- Edvardas Turauskas (1928–1934)
- Pranas Dailidė (1934–1939)
- Valentinas Gustainis (1939–1940)
- Kostas Korsakas (1940)
- Jurgis Griška (1941)
- Aleksejus Jermakovas (1944–1945)
- Andrejus Murachtanovas (1945–1953)
- Donatas Roda (1953–1978)
- Feliksas Pažūsis (1978–1982)
- Algimantas Mykolas Stankevičius (1982–1989)
- Robertas Grikevičius (1989–1990)
- Rolandas Barysas (1990–1991)
- Vidmantas Putelis (1991)
- Adolfas Gurskis (1992–1993)
- Algimantas Semaška (1993–1996)
- Kęstutis Jankauskas (1996–2004)
- Raimondas Kurlianskis (2004–2005)
- Rimantas Kanapienis (2005)
- Algis Kalanta (2005–2006)
- Gražina Ramanauskaitė-Tiumenevienė (2007–2015)
- Romas Bubnelis (2015–2017)
- Gitana Markovičienė (2017–2022)
- Daiva Juozaitytė (2022–2023)
- Vytautas Bruveris (2023–2025)
- Vytautas Benokraitis (2025)
- Viktorija Forosenko (since January 2026)

== See also ==
- Baltic News Service
