= Kristīne Garina =

Latvian human rights activist

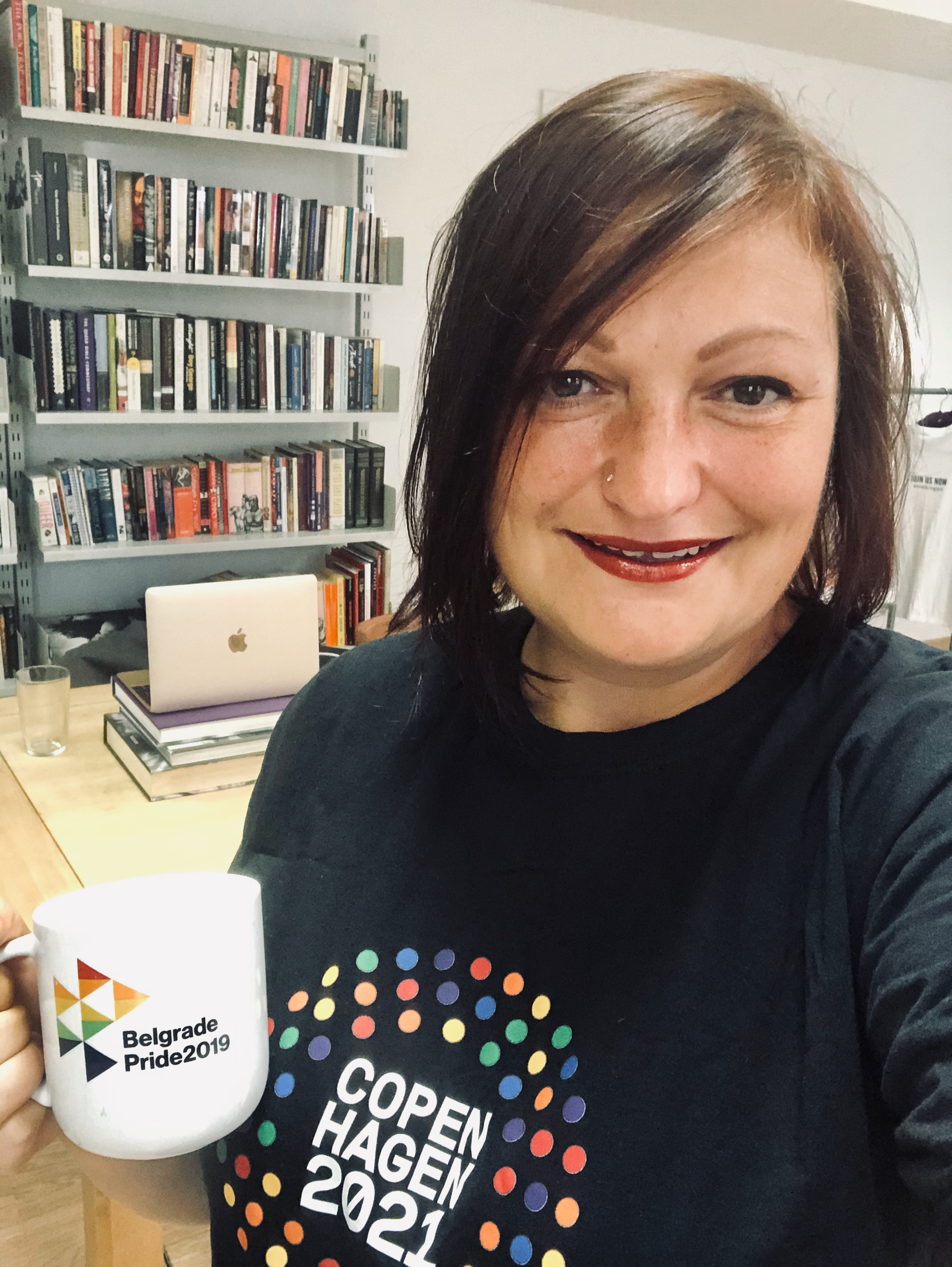
Kristīne Garina, at the closing session of the 2018 Human Rights Conference at Stockholm Pride

Kristīne Garina is a Latvian activist who was one of the founders of the LGBT organization Mozaīka in Riga and serves as its chairman of the board. She is the current president of the European Pride Organisers Association, the Brussels-based organization which plans events for EuroPride.

== Early life and education ==
Kristīne Garina was born in Riga, Latvia. She attended the University of Latvia earning a bachelor's degree in economics and management and then completing a master's degree in international relations. Upon completing her education, Garina began working in the automobile industry.

== Activism ==
After a wave of public homophobic acts against the LGBT community spiked when the first pride march was held in Riga in 2005, the following year, sixteen activists joined to form Mozaīka. The organization, functions as an advocacy group for the community, lobbies with policy makers, and organizes pride events. Garina was selected as a board member of the organization and she works to combat open homophobia against the community. She regularly publishes articles in various newspapers and websites like Latvijas Avīze and Delfi, pointing out discriminatory policies towards gays and lesbians such as the lack of parental leave to care for children, lack of eligibility for spousal pensions, lack of equal taxation or movement as a family unit, among other issues like hate speech and support for spousal protection legislation.

In 2013, Garina was elected as chairman of the board of Mozaīka, succeeding Linda Freimane. She served as the Latvian representative for both Baltic Pride and EuroPride in 2015. That year, Mozaīka was successful in its bid for EuroPride to be held in Riga. The event was planning was co-chaired by Garina and Kaspars Zālītis. They were able to negotiate holding the parade on Brivibas Iela (Freedom Street), a main boulevard which marchers had previously been denied permission to use for other Pride events. The success of the event, led to Garina's election to head the European Pride Organizers Association, a post she continued to hold in 2022. In 2020, because of the COVID-19 pandemic, Garina as head of the European Pride Organizers Association, and in conjunction with InterPride, created a virtual Global Pride event to allow virtual attendance.

== Citations and references ==
=== Cited sources ===
- Bernāts, Andris (27 July 2015). "Kam ir izdevīgi Rīgas praidi?" [Who Benefits from Riga Pride?]. Jauns.lv (in Latvian). Riga, Latvia: Izdevniecība Rīgas Viļņi. Archived from the original on 15 June 2022.
- Garina, Kristīne (1 April 2021). "Lai naida runa nekļūtu par ikdienu" [Let Hate Speech Not Become Commonplace]. Delfi (in Latvian). Tallinn, Estonia: Ekspress Grupp. Archived from the original on 31 May 2022.
- Garina, Kristīne (26 March 2020). "Nedrošības un sociālās distancēšanās laikā viendzimuma pāri vēl aizvien ir 'tikai dzīvokļa biedri'" [In Times of Insecurity and Social Distancing, Same-Sex Couples Are Still 'Just Flat Mates']. Latvijas Avīze (in Latvian). Riga, Latvia. Archived from the original on 15 June 2022.
- Garina, Kristīne; Freimane, Linda (22 March 2018). "Kopdzīves likums. Valsts, kas cīnās pret savējiem" [The Law of Cohabitation: A Country That Fights against Its Own]. Delfi (in Latvian). Tallinn, Estonia: Ekspress Grupp. Archived from the original on 30 November 2020.
- Kronbergs, Tālivaldis (4 February 2013). "LGBT un viņu draugu apvienība MOZAĪKA ievēl jauno valdi" [LGBT Association MOZAIKA Elects a New Board]. Pride Latvia (in Latvian). Riga, Latvia. Archived from the original on 15 June 2022.
- Luongo, Michael (25 June 2015). "With Striking Global Solidarity, Europride Shines in Latvia". Gay City News. New York, New York. Archived from the original on 29 March 2022.
- Naylor, Aliide (2020). The Shadow in the East: Vladimir Putin and the New Baltic Front. London: I.B. Tauris. ISBN 978-1-78673-644-4.
- Taylor, Derrick Bryson (31 May 2020). "World Leaders, Pop Stars and Drag Queens to Headline Livestream for Gay Pride". The New York Times. New York, New York. Archived from the original on 27 May 2022.
- "2015 "Europride" in Riga To See Several Thousand Participants". The Baltic Course. Riga, Latvia: Cordex Media. 5 September 2012. Archived from the original on 15 June 2022.
- "Kristīne Garina". Sarunu festivāls LAMPA (in Latvian). Riga, Latvia: DOTS Foundation. 2022. Archived from the original on 16 June 2022.
- "Pride Leaders from across Europe Are Heading for Cheltenham". Glos News. Cheltenham, Gloucestershire. Gloucestershire News Service. 10 May 2022. Archived from the original on 15 June 2022.
