= MicroLink =

Company based in Estonia

- Company type: Private
- Industry: IT services
- Founded: 1991
- Defunct: around 2011
- Headquarters: Tallinn, Estonia
- Area served: Baltic states
- Key people: Rainer Nõlvak; Hanno Haamer
- Services: Systems integration ISP
- Website: www.microlink.ee

MicroLink was a Baltic IT company, founded by Rainer Nõlvak and Hanno Haamer in August 1991 in Tallinn, Estonia. Launched as a PC maker, it diversified into IT distribution (CHS Estonia), systems integration (Microlink Systems) and providing of internet services (MicroLink Online) and electronics manufacturing (MicroLink Electronics). The company established itself as the largest Baltic PC maker by the mid-1990s.

In 1998, the company appointed Allan Martinson as its CEO and merged with the 2nd largest Estonian IT company Astrodata. A period of quick growth ensued, fuelled by 4 private equity rounds from Baltic Investment Fund, Baltic Republics Fund and other players. In 1999–2000, the company grew 5 times by completing 15 mergers and acquisitions, including mergers with the biggest and second-biggest of the Latvian IT companies Fortech and VAR, seven internet service providers across the Baltic region etc. While the corporate headquarters remained in Tallinn, Estonia, the group became essentially pan-Baltic, with the largest number of employees and revenues from Latvia.

In 1999, the company also launched Delfi, which established itself as the leading news portal in all three Baltic countries. Initially, Delfi was set up as a 50:50 joint venture with BNS, the region's leading news agency, but eventually MicroLink bought out its counterpart.

Through the merger with Fortech, MicroLink also inherited a majority stake in SAF Tehnika, a Latvian developer and producer of microwave radio links.

At its peak, MicroLink employed near 1000 employees and had 60 million EUR in revenues.

In 2003–2005, MicroLink sold off its investments. Delfi was sold for 5 m EUR to Norwegian company Findexa (resold 3 years later to Estonian Ekspress Grupp for 51 m EUR). SAF Tehnika became the first and only listed Baltic stock at Riga Stock Exchange in the IPO that valued the company at 52 m EUR. MicroLink Computers was sold to the management and MicroLink Electronics to Amphenol. Finally, MicroLink's core IT business was sold to three Baltic telecom companies (Eesti Telekom, Lattelecom and Teo LT). in a deal exceeding 20 m EUR. Soon after this sale, MicroLink's Lithuanian arm was sold by Lithuanian telecom TEO.LT to MTVP venture capital company and part of the Latvian operations – the leading local ERP software maker FMS – to the management.

The last CEO of independent MicroLink was Jānis Bergs, who took the post over in 2004.

In 2006, Microlink Latvia Ltd. was renamed Lattelecom Technology, but since 2019 its name is T2T.

By 2011, both Latvian and Estonian telecoms had merged MicroLink with their core operations and MicroLink ceased to exist both as a brand and an independent corporate entity. The Lithuanian MicroLink was named Hostex and sold back to Teo LT in 2010.

Microlink business interests included: system integration and infrastructure solutions, software development, ERP and business solutions, IT consulting and training, central systems and datacentre solutions and end-user PC services and support.
