= Rimvydas Valatka =

Lithuanian politician

Rimvydas Valatka (born 19 December 1956 near Irkutsk, Soviet Union) is a Lithuanian journalist and signatory of the 1990 Act of the Re-Establishment of the State of Lithuania. He graduated from Vilnius Pedagogical University in 1980 with a degree in history education. He now works as deputy chief editor of the largest Lithuanian daily Lietuvos rytas and editor-in-chief of its online edition at lrytas.lt.

2012-2015 editor-in-chief of the newspaper and news portal 15min, 2015-2016 editor-in-chief and director of Veidas magazine, in 2017 the editor-in-chief of the ELTA news agency.
