= Rahva Raamat =

Company based in Estonia

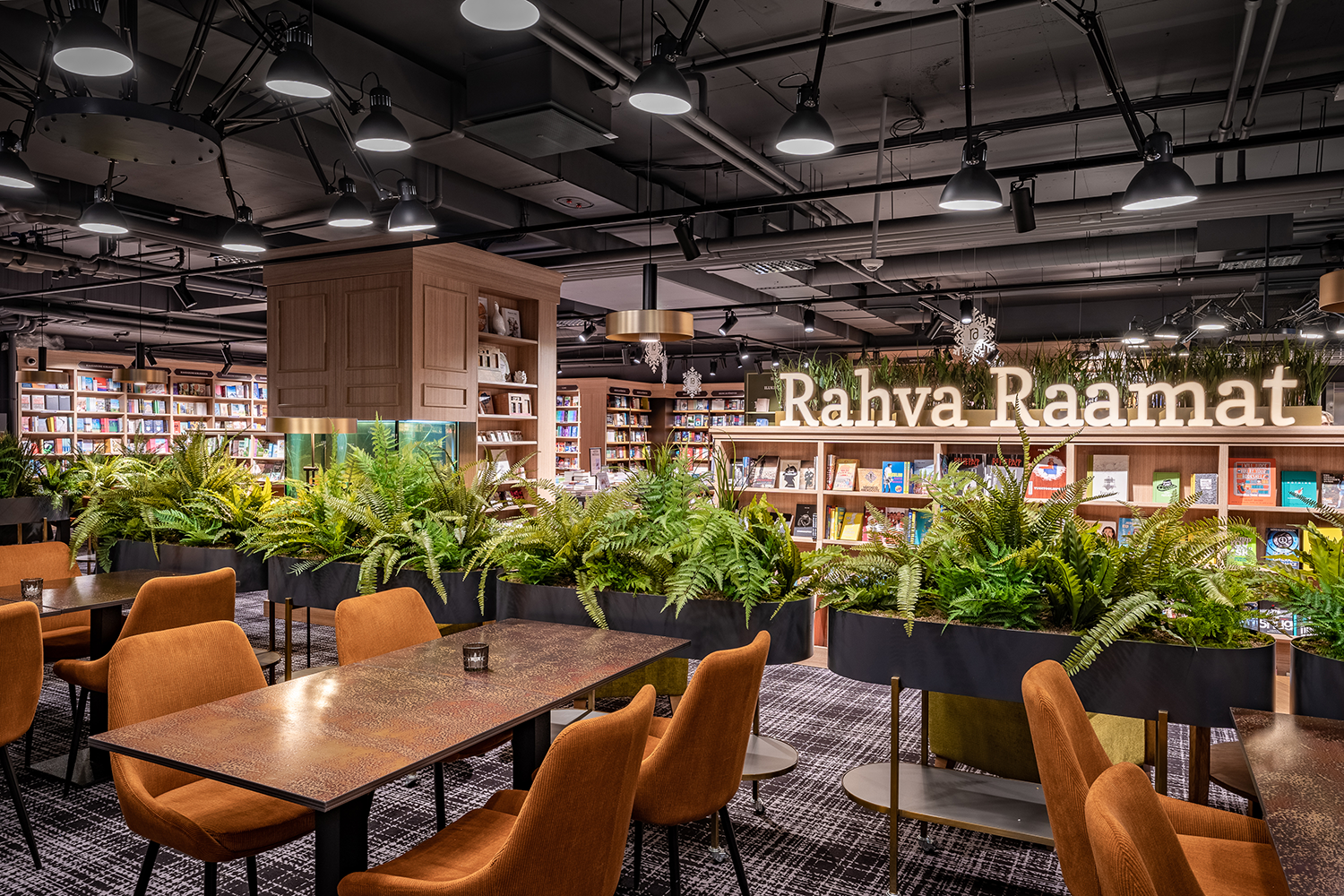
Rahva Raamat in Viru Keskus is the largest boosktore in Estonia and has won the International Excellence Award at the London Book Fair, recognizing it as the world's best bookstore.

Rahva Raamat is the largest retail and wholesale bookseller in Estonia. It has 15 bookstores, a restaurant, and two cafés in 9 Estonian cities, as well as an online store.

The company is named after the Rahva Raamat's bookstore, which operated at Pärnu mnt 10 in Tallinn and was given this name in 1962 (previously called Bookstore No. 1). Since bookstores have been operating at the same location since 1912, when Gustav Pihlakas opened a book and stationery store, Rahva Raamat AS also considers its history to date back to 1912.

During privatization, on May 6, 1997, the Estonian Privatisation Agency sold 49% of the shares of Rahva Raamat, which had until then operated as a state-owned joint-stock company, to AS KV Grupp under a purchase agreement. The remaining 51% of the shares were privatized in February 2001.

Hans H. Luik, the majority owner of the Ekspress Group, purchased Rahva Raamat in October 2004. The stores belonged to the Ekspress Group until 2010, when they were sold for 33 million kroons to OÜ Raamatumaja, owned by the store's executives Viljar Ots, Gertti Kogermann, and ICE Credit Group chairman, former Ekspress Group legal counsel Ülar Maapalu.

In 2017, Rahva Raamat Publishing House was established.

In December 2017, Rahva Raamat opened its first gift shop on the first floor of the Rocca al Mare shopping center, with an interior designed by architect Mari Koger. In 2024, a store based on the gift shop concept, Rahva Raamat SISU, was opened in Kristiine Center.

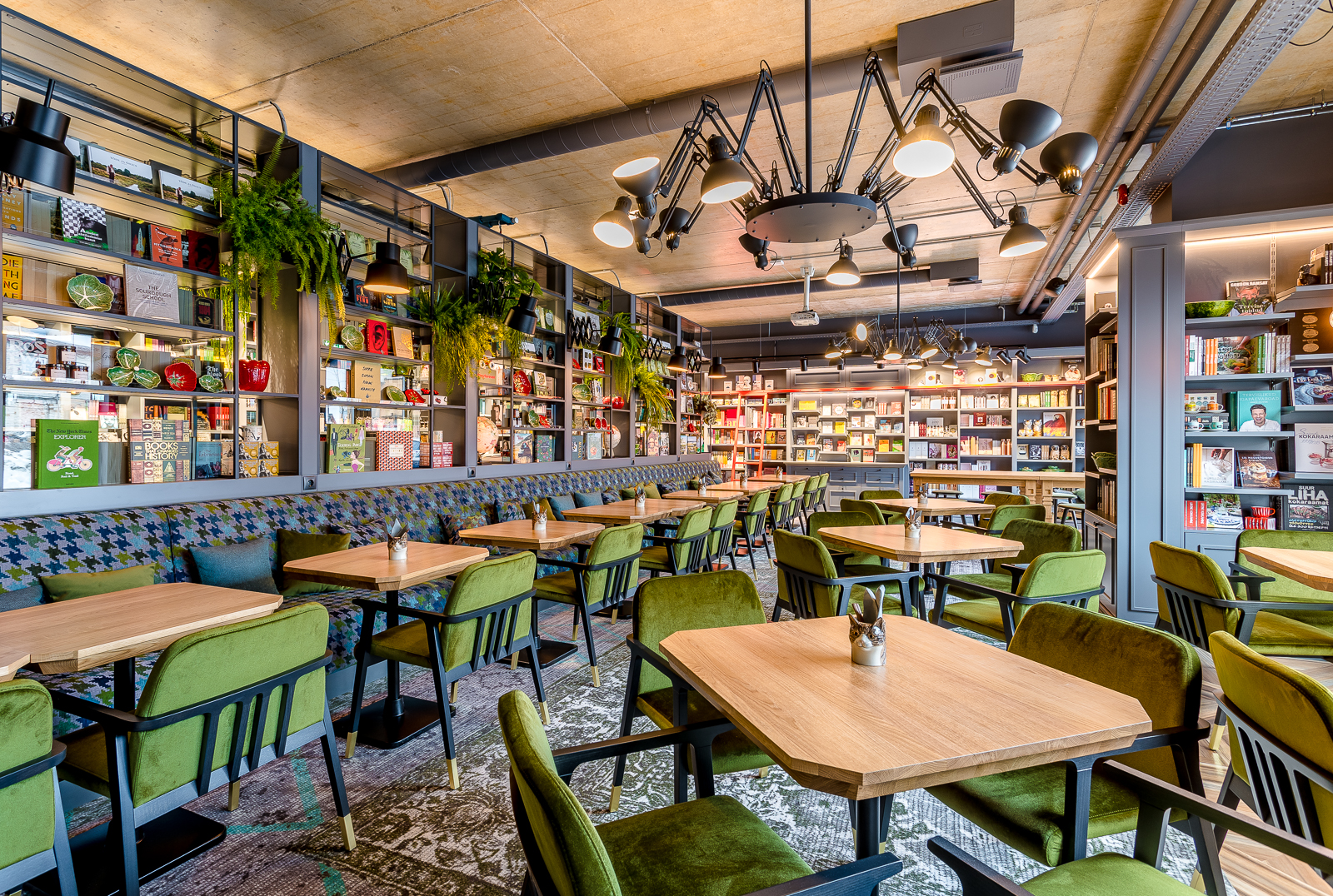
Telliskivi Rahva Raamat is home to both a bookstore and the restaurant Literaat.

At the beginning of 2019, Rahva Raamat opened its first restaurant and store in Telliskivi Quarter, Building I. In May 2020, the Rahva Raamat café and store in Telliskivi became the restaurant Literaat.

In March 2022, the Rahva Raamat store in Viru Center won the International Excellence Award at the London Book Fair, recognizing it as the world's best bookstore.

In addition to its retail stores, Rahva Raamat supplies major Estonian retail chains, including Selver, Prisma, Kaubamaja, Rimi, Maxima, and Coop Eesti, as well as most Estonian libraries and bookstores.

In October 2022, BaltCap announced that it would acquire Rahva Raamat, pending approval from the Competition Authority.

Since 2022, Rahva Raamat has been awarding an annual literary prize for Book of the Year.

== Rahva Raamat's stores ==
In Tallinn:

- Bookstore and café Literaat in Viru Center
- Bookstore and restaurant Literaat in Telliskivi Quarter
- SISU bookstore in Kristiine Centre
- Bookstore in Mustika Center
- Vanalinna Rahva Raamat and café Literaat at Pärnu mnt 10
- Bookstore in Arter Quarter
- Bookstore in T1 Mall of Tallinn

In Tartu:

- Bookstore in Tasku Shopping Centre

In Pärnu:

- Bookstore in Port Artur 2

In Võru:

- Bookstore in Kagukeskus

In Viljandi:

- Bookstore in Centrum keskus

In Kuressaare:

- Bookstore in Ferrumi kaubamaja

In Rakvere:

- Bookstore in Põhjakeskus

In Jõhvi:

- Bookstore in Pargi Keskus

In Narva:

- Bookstore in Astri keskus

== History ==
Rahva Raamat was founded in 1912, when Estonian publisher Gustav Pihlakas opened his bookstore at Pärnu mnt 10, a newly designed house by respected Finnish-American architect Eliel Saarinen. Since then, there has always been a bookstore in the same premises.

In October 2002, Rahva Raamat in Pärnu mnt 10 in Tallinn was in danger of being closed down. Hundreds of protesters appeared on the street, which helped the oldest bookstore in Estonia to stay open.

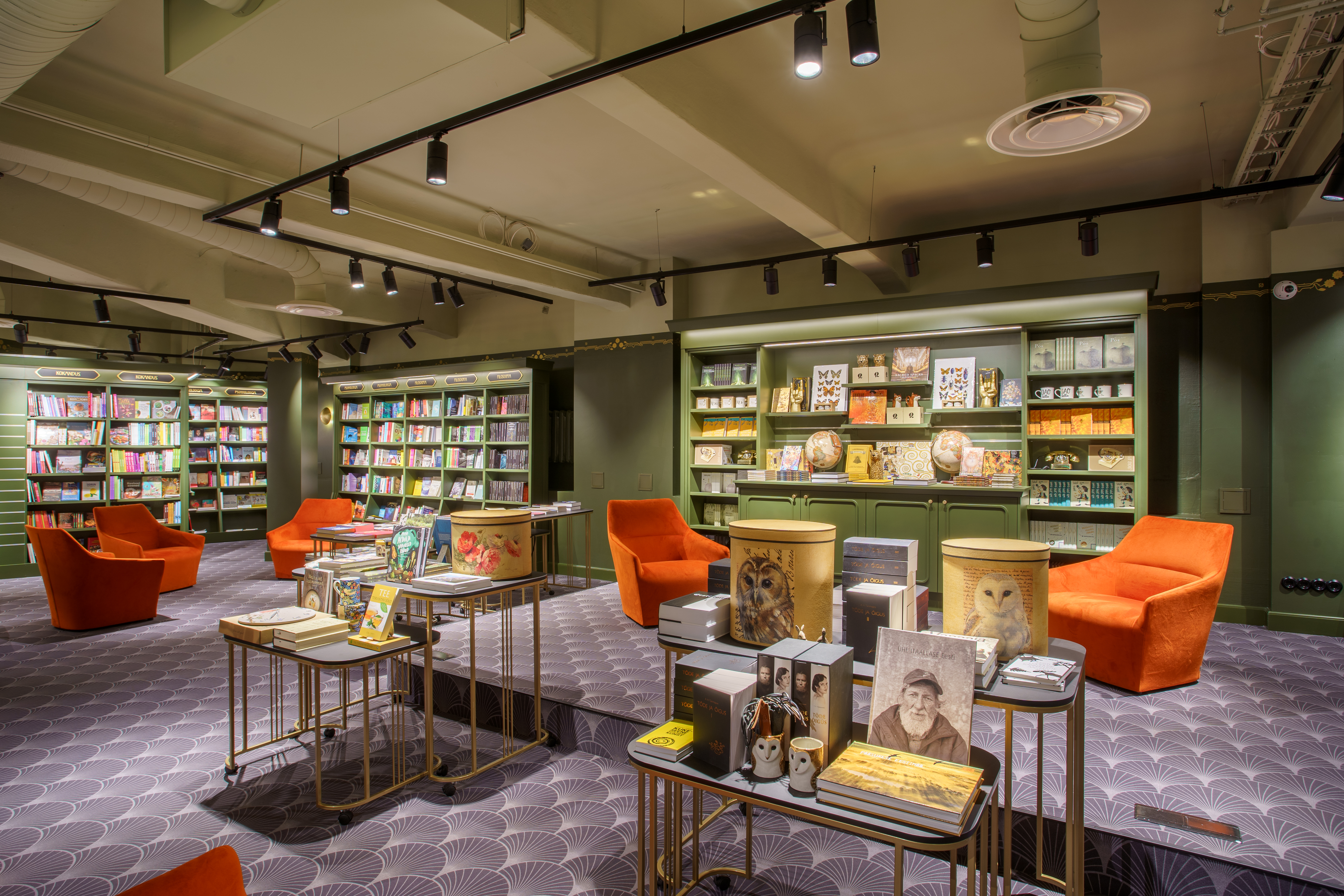
Rahva Raamat's Old Town store at Pärnu mnt 10, which is also the oldest bookstore in Estonia, was ranked among the world's top three bookstores in 2020.

In 2016, Rahva Raamat store at Pärnu mnt 10 was chosen among the four best bookstores in the world at the London Book Fair. It was also recognized as Estonia's trade act of the year. In March 2022, the Rahva Raamat store in Viru Center won the International Excellence Award at the London Book Fair, recognizing it as the world's best bookstore.

BaltCap announced in October 2022 that it would buy Rahva Raamat after the permission of the Competition Authority.
