= Lithuania Tribune =

the Lithuania Tribune
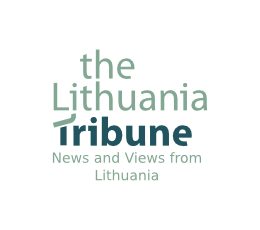
- Website type: News portal
- Available in: English
- Owner: VšĮ Baltoscandia Media
- Creator: Ruslanas Iržikevičius
- Website: lithuaniatribune.com
- Commercial: Non - profit
- Registration: Optional
- Launched: 2009, August 1
- Current status: Active

Lithuania Tribune is an online news portal providing news about Lithuania in English (as well as some articles in Russian and for a few years in Mandarin). It caters to foreigners with business and diplomatic interests in Lithuania, as well as the Lithuanian diaspora.

== Partnership ==
On 12 February 2013, The Lithuania Tribune and DELFI, the largest online news portal in the Baltic States announced a joint partnership. The Lithuania Tribune commenced operating a mirrored news portal of DELFI in order to bring Lithuania's news in English to DELFI’s readers via the site en.delfi.lt. From 2014 May to 2019 April the Lithuania Tribune had been administrating EN.DELFI by the Lithuania Tribune.

Since terminating its cooperation with DELFI the Lithuania Tribune has returned to its original home and had been publishing on https://lithuaniatribune.com/
