= Viru Keskus =

Shopping center in Tallinn

Coordinates: 59°26′11″N 24°45′21″E

Viru Keskus (or Viru Centre, Estonian: Viru Keskus) is a shopping and entertainment centre in Tallinn, Estonia. By the number of visitors, it is the biggest shopping centre in Estonia. The centre is the largest beauty products' and jewellery area in the Baltic States.

The centre was opened in 2004. The cost was 700 million kroons. A glass tunnel was installed between the buildings to connect Tallinna Kaubamaja and Viru Keskus. The Centre is Rahva Raamat bookstore and Kaubamaja Toidumaailm.

The Viru Hotel (nowadays known as Sokos Hotel Viru) is located next to the centre, and there is a 9 station bus terminal underneath it, 3 of which are on-ground reserve bus stops, in case the terminal is closed or in maintenance. The bus terminal hosts the following lines: 1 to Viimsi, 8A to Äigrumäe, 14 to Pääsküla (express line, runs from Monday to Friday), 18, 18a, 20A, 29, and 44. And station in a -1 floor

== Awards ==
- 2004 Development Project of the Year
- 2004 Best Service Provider
- 2006 Best Service Provider
