= 15min =

Lithuanian news website

- Industry: News media
- Headquarters: Lithuania
- Key people: Tomas Balžekas; CEO
- Revenue: €11.234 million (2024)
- Parent: 4 Bees
- Website: www.15min.lt

15min (Lithuanian: Penkiolika minučių) is one of the largest news websites in Lithuania, attracting over one million unique users per month. JSC 15min is owned by the Lithuanian company 4 Bees, which is owned by Tomas Balžekas, Martynas Basokas, Gabrielė Burbienė, and Tomas Bindokas.

== History ==
Old logo of 15min

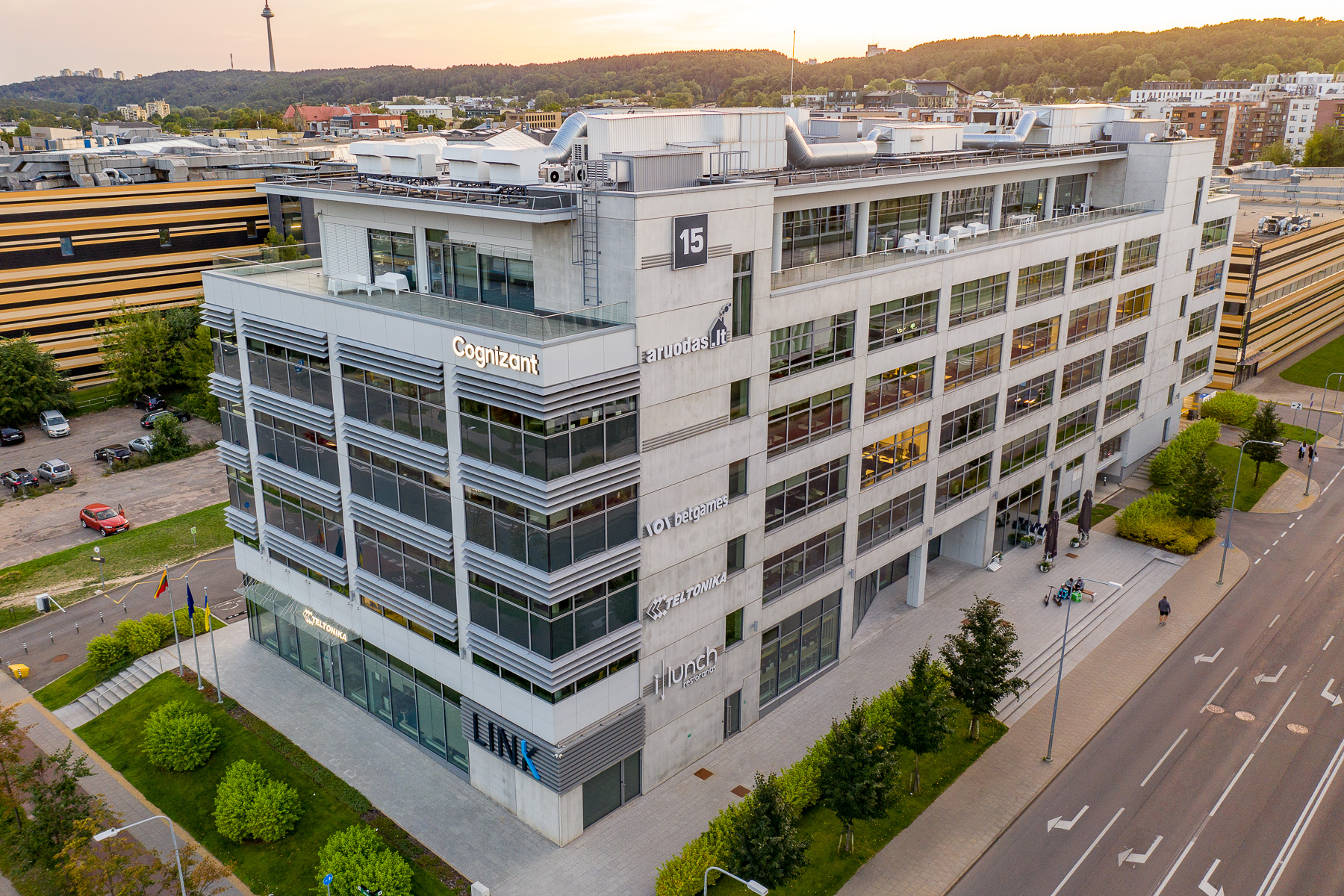
15min headquarters in Vilnius

Founded on 1 September 2005, 15min started as a daily newspaper distributed freely across Vilnius, Kaunas, and Klaipėda through various channels, including in public transport, streets, and some cafés. Seven months later, the Norwegian media conglomerate Schibsted acquired the company overseeing its operations.

On 7 August 2008, the company expanded its reach by launching the online news portal 15min.lt. The frequency of publication was reduced to three times per week as of Autumn 2009. In December 2011, the publication transitioned into a weekly newspaper obtainable in seven Lithuanian cities. Additionally, it launched a subscription delivery in April 2012.

In June 2013, the newspaper underwent a substantial transitional shift. A strategic decision was made to completely discontinue the printed publication and commit exclusively to digital publishing. In September, Schibsted decided to exit the Baltic market. Consequently, the Eesti Meedia, the parent company of the 15min, was sold to the senior management.

15min began functioning without an editor-in-chief in April 2015, entrusting department heads and editors with more managerial responsibility. Known for its investigative journalism, it was an official partner of the investigation team that verified and published the Panama Papers on 3 April 2016. That same month 15min updated the portal and the next month it disabled anonymous comments. At the same time it also introduced a paywall to ad-blockers, thus partially charging for content.

Under a partnership agreement active until 2017, 15min carried pieces from other brands of the Žurnalų leidybos grupės such as Žmonės. After that it replaced them with sections such as "Life," "Food," and "Names."

On 16 December 2019, a paid content subscription service was launched, initially named "15MAX" and later rebranded as "15min subscription." On 25 September 2020, the workers union "Independent 15min Editorial Staff" was formed, and the journalists from the Investigative Department resigned from their positions.

In 2021, it was announced that JSC "15min" would merge with JSC "Media Bitės". Upon completion of the merger, the "15min Group" became the owner of the news portal "15min," the news agency BNS, and the magazine "Žmonės."

In April 2021, it was reported that "15min," BNS, and "Media Bitės" were merging. After receiving approval from the Competition Council, the "15min Group" began operations in Lithuania. In this new structure, 60% is owned by AS "Postimees Grupp" and 40% by "4 Bees", which is owned by T. Balžekas, M. Basokas, G. Burbienė, and T. Bindokas. Following the merger, the businesses that belonged to "Media Bitės" became part of JSC "15min."

In December 2023, "4 Bees" acquired 60% of JSC "15min" and 100% of its subsidiary UAB "BNS" shares from AS "Postimees Grupp". "4 Bees" became the sole owner of 100% of the shares.

On 1 July 2024, it was announced that JSC "15min" had signed an agreement to acquire radio stations owned by "M-1," and on 31 July, it was announced that the acquisition deal was completed.

== Leaders ==
=== Managers ===
- 2005–2017 Tomas Balžekas
- 2017–2021 Ramūnas Šaučikovas
- 2021 Donatas Večerskis
- 2021–present Tomas Balžekas

=== Editors-in-Chief ===
- 2008–2010 Žilvinas Pekarskas
- 2011 Liudas Dapkus
- 2012–2015 Rimvydas Valatka
- 2015–2017 none
- 2017–2021 Raimundas Celencevičius
- 2021–present Vaidotas Beniušis
