= Eesti Ekspress =

Estonian newspaper

Coordinates: 59°26′16.55″N 24°45′57.23″E

- Type: Weekly newspaper
- Owner(s): Ekspress Grupp
- Founded: 1989
- Country: Estonia
- Circulation: 17,200 (as of February 2024)
- Website: ekspress.delfi.ee

Eesti Ekspress (Estonian Express) is an Estonian weekly newspaper.

Founded in 1989, Eesti Ekspress was the first politically independent newspaper in the Estonian Soviet Socialist Republic during the Soviet control of Estonia.

The paper is published by AS Eesti Ajalehed, a part of the public media company Ekspress Grupp (EEG1T) that is listed on the Tallinn Stock Exchange.

In March 2010 the newspaper shifted to a magazine-like format (275 × 355 mm) resembling Der Spiegel and Stern.

== History and profile ==
The paper was founded in 1989. The first issue was published on 22 September 1989. Making use of Gorbachev's policies of perestroika and glasnost, it was established as a weekly newspaper in 1989 by Hans H. Luik and others. The headquarters is in Tallinn.

The newspaper has been published throughout its history in essentially the same format, although with a number of appendices. The day of the issue changed from Thursday to Wednesday on 30 April 2014.

Eesti Ekspress has a liberal stance and is one of the investigative publications in Estonia. In 2001, it published a caricature depicting Efraim Zuroff of the Simon Wiesenthal Center as a bloodthirsty devil (with the caption "Unwanted guest"), after Zuroff presented his case against the Nazi collaborator and alleged Holocaust perpetrator Harry Männil to the Estonian Prime Minister Mart Laar. The newspaper has broken a number of important stories and been known for its innovation-mindedness. Considerably thicker than other newspapers of the late Soviet era, it was one of the first to make use of digital publishing technologies and photographic typesetting. Consequently, it has been notorious for popularising the incorrect usage of 'sh' and 'zh' in substitution of the characters 'š' and 'ž', which in late 1980s were rather inconvenient for computer processing but appear in a number of Estonian loanwords (e.g. garaaž, borrowed from French garage and tšau from Italian ciao) and names transliterated from Slavic languages, most importantly, Russian.

The newspaper remains one of the most popular newspapers in Estonia, with a circulation of 28,000 copies in 2015.
