= Reksoft =

Russian offshore software engineering company

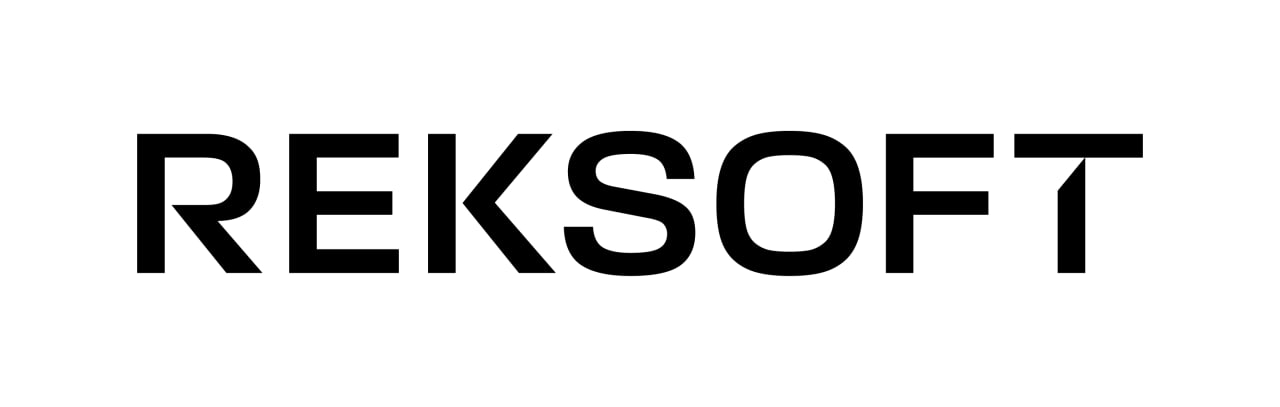
- Company type: Public
- Industry: Nearshore/Offshore Software Engineering Development and IT Outsoursing Services
- Founded: 1991
- Headquarters: St. Petersburg, Russia
- Area served: Worldwide
- Key people: Alexander Egorov (CEO)
- Services: Software Product Engineering, Software engineering Enterprise application services Application service provider Consulting services; Custom application development; Enterprise application integration; Application management; Migration and customisation Dedicated centres Offshore Development Center
- Number of employees: more than 350 (2010)
- Website: Official website

Reksoft is an offshore software engineering company specialising in software development and system integration services, specifically software product engineering, enterprise application services and dedicated centres. Reksoft has passed certification audit ISO 9001:2008, and is assessed to comply with CMMi Level 5. The company is based in St. Petersburg, Russia, and has regional offices in Stockholm, Sweden, and development centres in Moscow and Voronezh, Russia.

In 2008, Technoserv, one of the leading players in the Russian IT market, acquired a 74% stake in Reksoft.

== Clients ==
As of April 2021, Reksoft has served over 1000 companies worldwide, including T-Systems, Cadbury, Fujitsu, Gazprom, Mazda, Philip Morris International, Mavenir Systems, Springer Science+Business Media, Tieto, Lenze, Aastra, Alert Logic, FXDD, Agora Freight and Vimpelcom.

== Ranking ==
In 2009, Reksoft was awarded the rank of Rising Star by the International Association of Outsourcing Professionals. In the same year, Reksoft was listed as one of the top 20 Russian IT service providers. In 2010, Reksoft was listed in the 2010 Global Services 100 List In 2011, Reksoft was listed in the 2011 Global Services 100 List». In 2012, Reksoft was listed in the 2012 Global Services 100 List». This year Reksoft was also awarded the rank of Rising Star by the International Association of Outsourcing Professionals.

In 2020, Reksoft was named one of the Top 100 Western European developers by industry ranking platform Clutch

== History ==
- 1991: Reksoft is co-founded by Alexander Egorov with two friends from Saint Petersburg State University of Aerospace Instrumentation.
- 1992: Reksoft wins first international contract, with Swiss telecommunications concern Ascom Infrasys. Reksoft has been developing software for Ascom's Telecom Solutions and PBX divisions ever since.
- 1995-1998: Reksoft develops its own branded software products and internet solutions, including Barsum, a call accounting and billing solution, spun off in 2005; Assist, an internet payment gateway, sold to mCommerce, Inc. in 2003; Ozon, Russia's largest internet store, bought out by Baring Vostok Capital Partners investment fund in 2000; and Edelweiss/Medallion, a property management solution, sold to Softbrands, Inc. in 2003.
- 2000: Reksoft business processes are assessed to comply with ISO 9001:2000 certifications
- 2001: Reksoft opens in-house training centre where undergraduate students take courses in software development, testing and project management.
- 2003: Reksoft opens regional sales office in Stockholm, Sweden, and a development centre in Moscow, Russia.
- 2005: MartinsonTrigon, a Nordic venture capitalist company, has invested 2 million dollars into Reksoft. The investment was used with the purpose to secure the growth strategies of Reksoft.
- 2006: Reksoft assessed to comply with CMMi Level 4
- 2007: Reksoft opens regional sales office in Munich, Germany.
- 2008: Reksoft joins TechnoServ A/S, Russia's largest system integrator, and opens a development centre in Voronezh, Russia.
- 2009: Reksoft passes certification audit ISO 9001:2008 and is assessed to comply with CMMi Level 5.
- 2010: Reksoft is listed in the 2010 Global Services 100. Company joins Climate Savers Computing Initiative.
- 2011: Reksoft is listed in the 2011 Global Services 100.
- 2012: Reksoft is listed in the 2012 Global Services 100.
- 2013: Reksoft awarded Rising Stars status IAOP 2013 Global Outsourcing Ranking
