= LETA =

Latvian news agency

LETA is the main Latvian news agency. Its headquarters are in Riga. It is owned by Estonian entrepreneur Margus Linnamäe through his company Postimees Group.

== History ==
It was founded as Latopress in 1919, soon after Latvia became independent; the name was changed to LTA the next year when the wire service was subordinated to the Latvian Telegraph Agency. The name LETA was only used occasionally during the interwar period.

In 1940, when Latvia was occupied by the Soviet Union, it became a subordinate agency of the Telegraph Agency of the Soviet Union (TASS), a status it would keep until Latvia regained independence in 1991.

During the occupation of Latvia by Nazi Germany, LETA was subordinated to the German DNB news agency.

From 1971 it was known as Latinform. On 31 May 1990, the Latvian government restored the name LETA and the news agency's independence from TASS.

In 1997, LETA was put up for privatisation by the Latvian state.

On 27 April 2011, the LETA website was defaced by an unknown hacker who claimed to be protesting commercially biased news sources. It was down for a few hours as was the LETA side project "nozare.lv" and others.

In 2015, Estonian entrepreneur Margus Linnamäe's UP Invest acquired LETA, and placed it under media company Eesti Meedia (now known as Postimees Group). The acquisition plan was first announced in August 2015. Eesti Meedia already owned rival news agency Baltic News Service (BNS), but the Linnamäe-owned media company sold BNS operations in Latvia (subsequently renamed Latvian News Service) and media monitoring service Mediju Monitorings to a third-party Estonian company named AMP Investeeringud on 31 August 2015. UP Invest has set up a subsidiary named Latvia Newsworks, which has been the owner of 99.66% stake in LETA since October 2015. The Competition Council of Latvia made a decision on 23 December 2015 that the deal would not impact competition, and approved the acquisition on 5 January 2016. Later, it was discovered that most employees of the Latvian News Service and Mediju Monitorings were transferred to LETA, but was not disclosed to the Latvian authorities at the time of the acquisition. On 18 January 2019, the Competition Council imposed a €32,200 fine on MM Group (UP Invest's parent company).
