= Hans H. Luik =

Estonian journalist, theatre critic and media entrepreneur

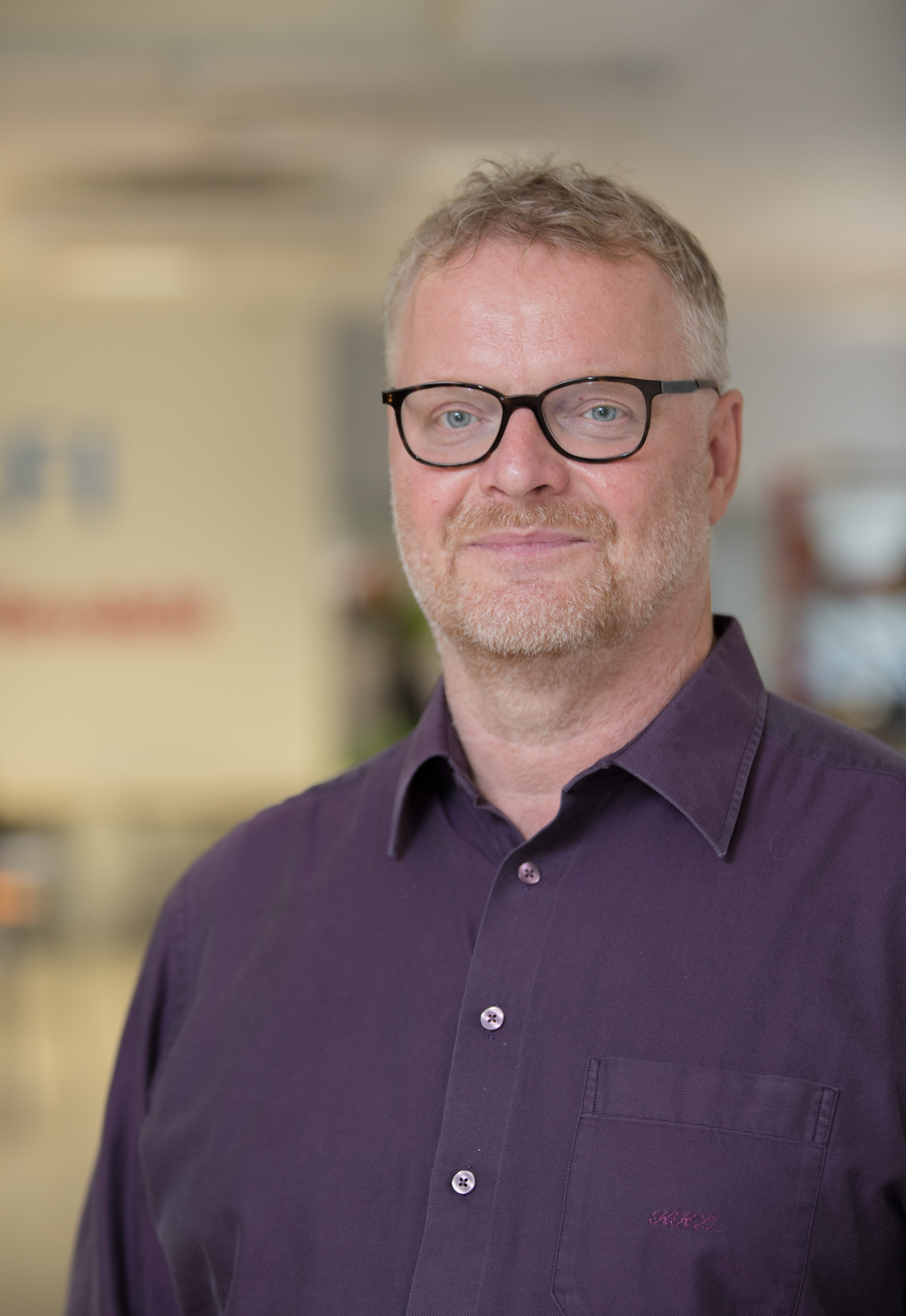
Hans H. Luik

Hans H. Luik (born 20 March 1961 in Tartu) is an Estonian journalist, theatre critic and media entrepreneur.

In 1984, he graduated from Tartu State University in journalism. In 1989―1991, he was the chief editor of Eesti Ekspress; later being the newspaper's responsible publisher and owner. He is the founder of AS Ekspress Grupp.

He has written plays and he has had roles in several films.

He lives with Kristiina Tänavsuu, with whom he has a son Ludvig.

== Works ==
- 1984: play Tuled sa tagasi?
- 1986: play Seitsmepäine haldjas
