= Lrytas.lt =

Lithuanian news portal

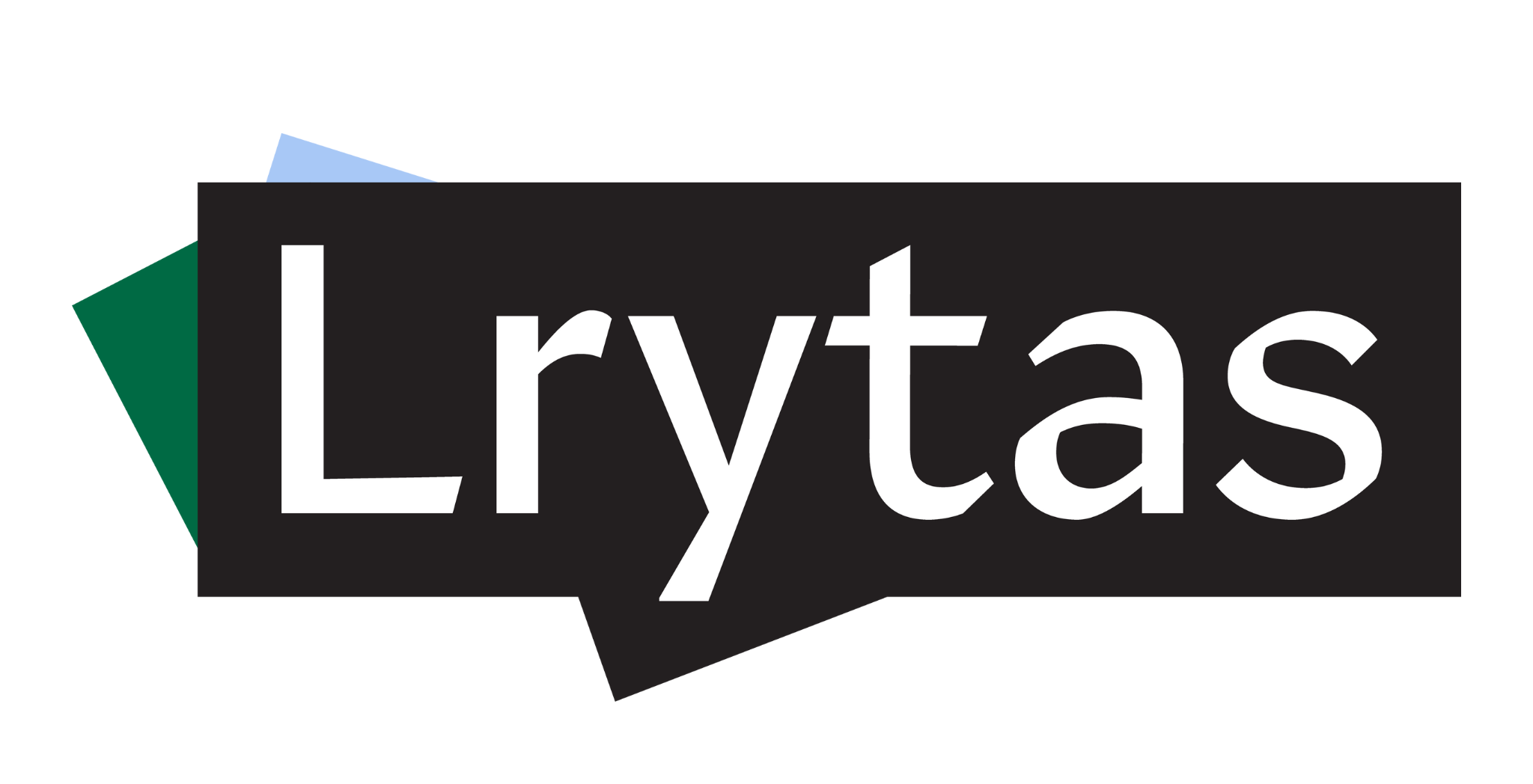
- Website type: news portal
- Available in: Lithuanian
- Founded: February 14, 2006
- Headquarters: Gedimino av. 12a, Vilnius, LT-01103, Lithuania
- Owner: Ekspress Grupp
- Website: http://lrytas.lt
- Commercial: Yes
- Current status: Active

Lrytas.lt is one of the largest Lithuanian news portals with audience of 1 million visitors per month on the Internet and more than 300,000 visitors on mobile. "Lrytas.lt" was the media part of "Lietuvos rytas" group. In 2022 "Ekspress Grupp" acquisition deal covers only the "lrytas.lt" online platform and does not include "Lietuvos rytas" printed publications. The portal is separated from the editorial office of the printed newspaper and will continue to operate as a separate media outlet.

== Company development ==
Lrytas.lt started its operation in 1997 as the online mirror copy of "Lietuvos rytas" daily. In 2006, it became a separate news website company. Online video services took place in June 2008 and later evolved to a separate co-site: lrytas.tv. Lrytas.tv is the most popular online television in Lithuania. It offers real-time streaming of the Lietuvos Rytas television and exceptional reports exclusively for lrytas. lt readers.

== Co-sites ==
Lrytas.lt consists of several subportals: online TV (tv.lrytas.lt), Bendraukime (citizen journalism), Augintinis (animals), Receptai (recipes), Skelbimai (advertisements).
