= The Baltic Course =

Pan-Baltic business magazine

- Website type: Online magazine
- Available in: English, Russian
- Founded: 1996 (as a paper magazine)
- Founder: Jānis Domburs
- Editor: Olga Pavuk
- Employees: 5
- Website: Website
- Current status: Inactive

The Baltic Course was a pan-Baltic business magazine. Its editor-in-chief was Olga Pavuk.

== History ==
The magazine was founded in 1996 by Latvian journalist Jānis Domburs and initially was published only in Russian. In 1998, Olga Pavuk joined the magazine as an assistant editor and The Baltic Course was launched in English in 2000. A year later, the magazine was bought by publishing house Preses nams, with Pavuk becoming the editor-in-chief of both of the magazine's language versions.

in 2007, the magazine moved online and ceased to be published on paper. In January 2008, a website of business information and analytics about the Baltic States was launched in both English and Russian. After going online, the magazine reported having 70–100 thousand unique readers a month. In 2020, 40% of the magazine's website visitors were from the U.S., about 30% came from Latvia, 8% from Russia, and 4% from both Estonia and Lithuania.

On 1 January 2021, the magazine stopped publishing new articles, while vowing to continue keeping its website and archive of previous articles online.
