= Aizliegtais paņēmiens =

Latvian television program

- Genre: Investigative journalism
- Created by: Guntis Bojārs
- Written by: Guntis Bojārs, Sanita Miķelsone
- Directed by: Liene Zeimunde
- Presented by: Guntis Bojārs
- Narrated by: Aigars Rozenbergs; Gusts Kikusts
- Country of origin: Latvia
- Original language: latvian
- No. of seasons: 12
- No. of episodes: 400+

Production
- Editor: Uģis Kronbergs
- Running time: 37 minutes (seasons 1—2), 50 minutes (seasons 3—present)

Original release
- Network: Latvijas Televīzija
- Release: 11 October 2013 – present

Aizliegtais paņēmiens (lat. The Forbidden Method) is a Latvian investigative news program produced by Latvijas Televīzija (LTV). Its creator and host is journalist Guntis Bojārs. Every program is divided into two segments: Operation and Discussion. During the Operation segment LTV journalists use both public information and hidden camera to research a popular subject in Latvia. During the Discussion segment host Guntis Bojārs interviews usually 3 experts or politicians on their observations while watching the Operation.

== Title sequence ==
Each episode begins with a brief description of the program. Riga landscape and passersby are shown, but these frames are accelerated. Background music is played. Almost all the series (except for specials) begin with the following introductory phrase read by Aigars Rozenbergs:

We'll probably be condemned, but, forgive us, sometimes it's the only way to find out the reality of events, the law and the true face of society. How is it really? "Forbidden method".

== Series overview ==
Season	Episodes	Originally aired	
Season	Episodes	First aired	Last aired
1	26	11 October 2013	14 June 2014
2	40	1 September 2014	22 June 2015
3	35	7 September 2015	23 May 2016
4	36	5 September 2016	5 June 2017
5	39	4 September 2017	18 June 2017
6	34	3 September 2018	27 May 2019
7	TBA	2 September 2019	TBA

== Awards ==
In 2017 the five episode special Operācija: "Tokija" (lit. Operation: Tokyo) gained Employers’ Confederation of Latvia prize. In this special a journalist from Latvijas Televīzija worked in restaurant chain Tokyo City and documented using a hidden camera a sustained tax evasion scheme.
