= Segodnya (1999) =

- Publisher: Izdevniecības nams Vesti, Ltd.
- Editor-in-chief: Andrey Shvedov
- Photo editor: Vladimir Starkov
- Founded: 1999
- Language: Russian
- Headquarters: Riga
- ISSN: 1407-4699

Segodnya ('Today', Russian: Сегодня) is a tabloid newspaper published in Latvia. Formerly named Sovetskaya molodezh ('Soviet Youth'), SM segodnya and until 2017 Vesti segodnya ('News Today'), in 2010 it had the highest subscription among Russian language dailies in Latvia and equal third highest in the country overall. It has its roots in the official newspaper of Komsomol under Soviet rule in Latvia, Sovetskaya Molodyozh. Content is published on the news portal vesti.lv.

Its name is similar to Segodnya, a notable Russian emigre newspaper issued in Riga from 1919 to 1940.

Segodnya newspaper claims to be the only Russian-language daily in the European Union. Segodnya has, as have Vesti.lv and related publications, been described as pro-Russian and "overtly cynical" in their reporting, describing a wider trend evident in the Russian-language media landscape in Latvia that includes low wages for journalists, low readership and ad revenues.
