= Playforia =

Online game service

- Logo of Aapeli.com
- Website type: Online games
- Available in: English, Finnish, Swedish, Norwegian, Dutch, German, Spanish, Estonian, French, Italian, Latvian, Lithuanian, Hungarian, Turkish, Polish and Russian
- Owner: Playforia Inc.
- Creators: Asmo Halinen, Pasi Laaksonen(programming), Janne Matilainen (AD)
- Website: www.playforia.net
- Registration: Optional
- Launched: October 10, 2002; 24 years ago
- Current status: Offline

Playforia was an online game community created by Finnish game studio Playforia Inc. in 2002. It was one of the most popular online game services in Finland where it was known as aapeli.com. The service was available in various languages and offered a variety of Flash and Java-based browser games. As of the end of 2018, Playforia announced to close its web presence on January 7, 2019.

Their final words were:

"As of January 7, Playforia is moving onto greener pastures. Thank you for the amazing experience and all the beautiful memories. May we meet again!

Kind regards,

Sparky and the Playforia Team"
