= SAF Tehnika =

Latvian data transmission company

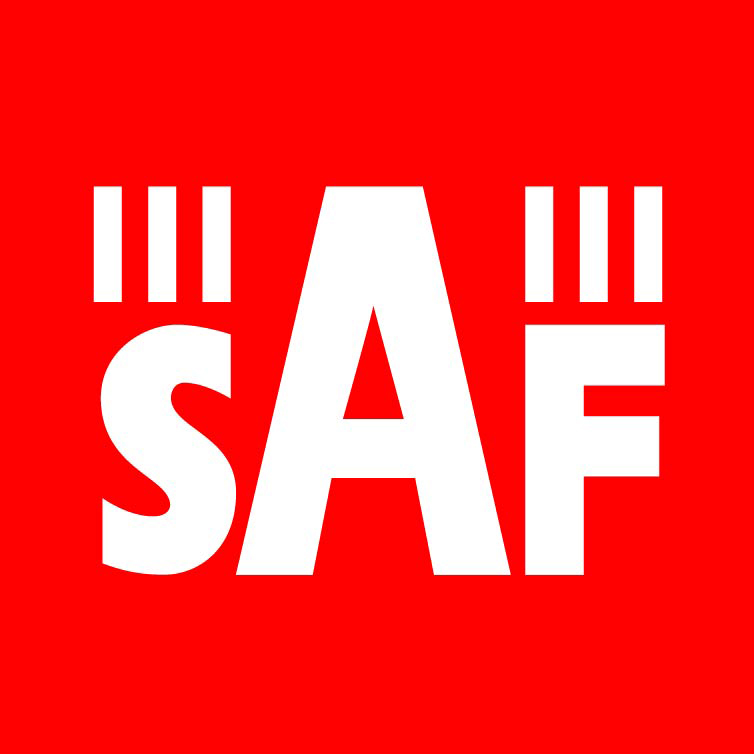
- Type: JSC, Public company (Nasdaq Baltic: SAF1R)
- Industry: Microwave data transmission equipment manufacturer and distributor
- Founded: 1999
- Founder: Didzis Liepkalns
- Headquarters: Riga, Latvia
- Products: Telecommunications and data transmission equipment (Microwave radio, PDH, SDH, IP radio equipment radio)
- Revenue: €25.99 million (FY 2024/2025)
- Net income: −€643 thousand (FY 2024/2025)
- Total assets: 25,084,323 euro (2023)
- Number of employees: 270 average (FY 2024/2025)
- Website: www.saftehnika.com

SAF Tehnika (from Latvian: Super Augstas Frekvences, lit. 'Super High Frequencies'; Nasdaq Baltic: SAF1R) is a Latvian designer, manufacturer and distributor of digital microwave data transmission equipment. The group's activities include digital microwave radio equipment for voice and data transmission, microwave spectrum analyzers and signal generators, and wireless sensor network solutions for environmental monitoring.

In the year 2004, SAF Tehnika acquired a Swedish company, – SAF Tehnika Sweden, a fully owned subsidiary, based in Gothenburg. In 2008, it was bought out by its management, which rebranded it as "Trebax AB". In May 2004, the company launched an IPO with initial market capitalization of more than €50 million, with substantial subscriptions from institutional investors. The company is listed on the NASDAQ OMX Riga under the symbol SAF1R.

During the 2000s, SAF Tehnika expanded globally by establishing a network of authorized partners and sales representatives worldwide. Notably, the company opened its North America office and warehouse facilities in Denver in 2013.

== Recent operations ==
In FY 2024/2025, SAF Tehnika's consolidated net turnover was €25.99 million. Exports accounted for 97% of the group's total turnover, and the group sold its products in 87 countries. During the same financial year, the group established a subsidiary in Canada and invested €812 thousand in IT infrastructure, production and research equipment, software, product certification and premises renovation.

== Key Company Milestones ==
- 1999 SAF Tehnika company establishment
- 2000 Introduction of PDH (CFM) product line
- 2003 ISO 9001 certification, Member of ETSI
- 2004 Acquisition of the Swedish company "Viking Microwave" developing SDH radio systems.
- 2004 Public company, listed on Riga Stock Exchange (now NASDAQ OMX Riga) after a successful IPO
- 2006 SDH (CFQ) product line launch in the market
- 2006 Sales growth up to 62 markets.
- 2006 Implementation of a new automated modern manufacturing line. Release of CFQ-RG-IDU – the latest addition to SAF CFQ product line
- 2008 Launch of 100 Mbit/s radio – SAF CFIP product line
- 2008 Buyout of SAF tehnika Sweden, which changes the name to "Trebax AB"
- 2009 Launch of 2 new 366 Mbit/s systems – CFIP Lumina and CFIP Phoenix
- 2010 first-in-the-market 100+Mbps radio system
- 2011 Launch of 2 new products – CFIP Marathon 1.4 GHz and CFIP Phoenix Modular
- 2012 Release of the CFIP Low Latency Active Repeater – highly competitive 6 GHz+ 35ns radio unit for use in low latency networks
- 2013 Opening of the US headquarters and warehouse in Denver, CO
- 2013 Launch of the next generation microwave radio platform Integra
- 2013 Company's global presence reached more than 130 countries worldwide
- 2013 Release of the world's smallest spectrum analyzer Spectrum Compact
- 2014 Launch of Integra S
- 2014 Launch of CFIP PhoeniX IRFU
- 2014 Launch of Integra-W and Integra-WS
- 2014 Launch of SG Compact
- 2015 Launch of Line of Sight Verification Kit
- 2015 Development of Ultra-Low Latency solutions with the key product being –CFIP Low Latency Repeater
- 2015 Development of Outdoor Branching Unit (OBU)
- 2015 Launch of Integra G, Integra GS
- 2016 Release of Spectrum Compact E-band
- 2017 Launch of environmental IoT monitor Aranet
- 2017 Release of Spectrum Compact V-band

=== Supporter of the University of Latvia Foundation ===
SAF Tehnika is a supporter of the University of Latvia Foundation. In 2011, the company supported the magazine "Terra" in the amount of 430 euros and the "Excellence Award 2011" in the amount of 1,450 euros. In 2015, a project was set up to support the participation of talented students in the World Physics Olympiad in Mumbai, India, in the amount of EUR 2,500. In 2016, the University of Latvia Business Ideas Fund is supported in the amount of 1,000 EUR.
