= Exit (investing) =

Selling an ownership stake in an investment

In corporate finance, mergers, venture capital, investment banking, private equity (including the leveraged buyout), and foreign direct investment, an exit is a deal for removing an ownership stake in an enterprise or temporary project. Types of exits include selling via an initial public offering or corporate acquisition, and writing off assets.

There is a point in the investment cycle where one or more investors (possibly a financial institution, small group of investors, or an individual) sells some or all of their ownership stake and takes profits. These transactions can have very different features depending on the investment assets, whether they are traditional companies, multi-billion dollar diversified conglomerates, or other more purely-financial entities, such as special-purpose acquisition companies.

== Common exit routes ==
In venture capital and private equity, common exit routes include an initial public offering (IPO), a trade sale to a strategic buyer, a sale to another private equity investor (secondary sale or secondary buyout), and, in unsuccessful cases, a write-off of the investment.

The choice of exit route depends on market conditions, the maturity of the company, and the objectives of the investor. International Finance Corporation publications similarly describe exits through IPOs, trade sales, sales to other investors, and management buyouts as standard mechanisms for realizing returns on private investments.
