= Delfi (web portal) =

Baltic internet portal

- Website type: web portal
- Available in: Estonian, English, Lithuanian, Latvian, Polish, Russian
- Revenue: €17.240 million (2024)
- Parent: Ekspress Grupp
- Website: The Delfi web portal for Estonia; The Delfi web portal for Latvia; The Delfi web portal for Lithuania
- Commercial: Yes
- Registration: Required for unlimited access
- Current status: Active

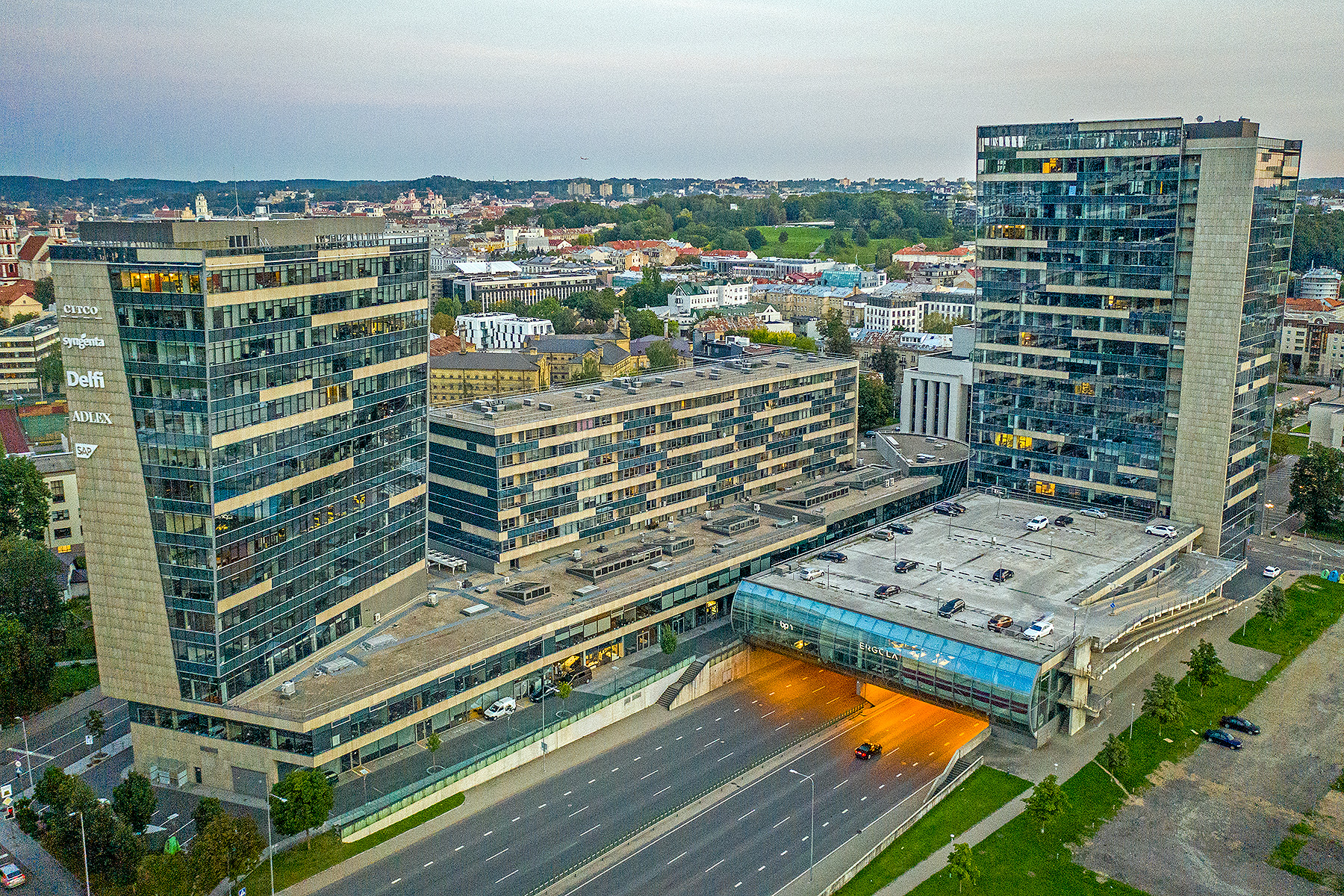
Lithuanian headquarters

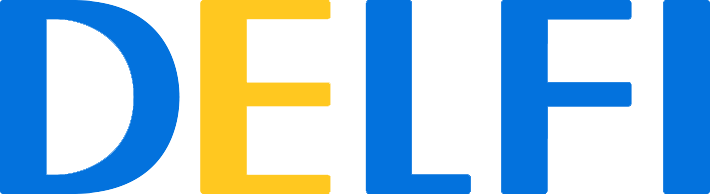
Previous logo used from 2014 to 2020, and Latvia in 2021

Delfi (occasionally capitalized as DELFI) is a news website in Estonia, Latvia, and Lithuania providing daily news, ranging from gardening to politics. It ranks as one of the most popular websites among Baltic users.

Delfi operates in the respective Baltic countries under the domain names delfi.ee, delfi.lv, and delfi.lt. Aside from versions in the Estonian, Latvian, and Lithuanian languages, the company offers Russian-language versions of its portal in all three countries. On 12 March 2012, Delfi started a Polish version under pl.delfi.lt. A year later an English version was added under en.delfi.lt.

In March 2014, the delfi.ua website was closed.

In February 2016, most of the delfi.lt English-language content was placed behind a paywall to restrict access to most articles without a paid subscription, as the articles in this version of Delfi are supported by the Lithuania Tribune, which raised questions on implementing the paywall there. Other language editions followed later on.

In 2024, Delfi and its parent company Ekspress Grupp achieved significant growth in digital subscriptions across all Baltic states. The total number of digital subscriptions increased by 15% year-over-year, reaching 238,182 subscribers by the end of December 2024.

In April 2024, Delfi signed a partnership agreement with ENEX, a European news exchange network. This partnership allows Delfi to exchange news content across the ENEX group and receive additional news content from ENEX's newsroom in Luxembourg. The agreement expanded ENEX's presence to 26 of the EU's 27 member states.

== Company development ==
Delfi was established in 1999 by the Estonian company MicroLink and sold in 2003, to the Norwegian company Findexa. In 2007, Estonian media group Ekspress Grupp acquired 100% of Delfi stocks for €54m. It operates under a single name in the three Baltic states of Lithuania, Estonia, and Latvia, and also in Ukraine. It has its own bureau in Moscow, Kaliningrad, Warsaw, and Stockholm. It also sources its news reports from the Baltic News Service and from wire services. In Lithuania, the Delfi news portal is operated by DELFI, UAB, a Lithuanian private limited company registered in Vilnius under company code 125483974.

== Freedom of speech ==
Because visitors of Delfi can anonymously comment on all news articles, the site generates debates over freedom of speech in the Baltic States. Some members of the Estonian and Lithuanian parliaments have proposed laws making Delfi and other news portals responsible for the contents of anonymous comments. In September 2006, attorneys for Artūras Zuokas, mayor of Vilnius, asked public prosecutors to seize Delfi servers and reveal the IP addresses of all anonymous commentators who have written comments about him in several Delfi publications.

In June 2015, the European Court of Human Rights ruled in Delfi AS v. Estonia that holding delfi.ee responsible for its readers' comments did not violate the European Convention on Human Rights' protection of freedom of speech.

== Legal proceedings ==
On May 14, 2025, the Regional Administrative Court of Lithuania rejected Delfi and its parent company Ekspress Grupp's appeal and upheld the Lithuanian Competition Council's decision that the Estonian media company had violated competition law. The Competition Council had originally fined Ekspress Grupp €140,460 in December 2023 for acquiring 100% of UAB Lrytas shares (operator of lrytas.lt news portal) without notifying authorities or obtaining required permission according to the Lithuanian Competition Law.

== Patron of the University of Latvia ==
Since 2018, Delfi has been a bronze patron of the University of Latvia Foundation. Support is granted to the university's students of Communication Science of the Faculty of Social Sciences, as well as other students of Communication and Journalism in all Latvian higher education institutions. In 2018, the first scholarships in the amount of 10,000 EUR were awarded. Delfi is an internet partner and supporter of the social scholarship Ceļamaize 2009.

== Sources ==
- Internet portals in the Baltic States: legal issues by Liutauras Ulevičius
