= Baltic News Service =

Estonian news agency reporting on news related to the Baltic states

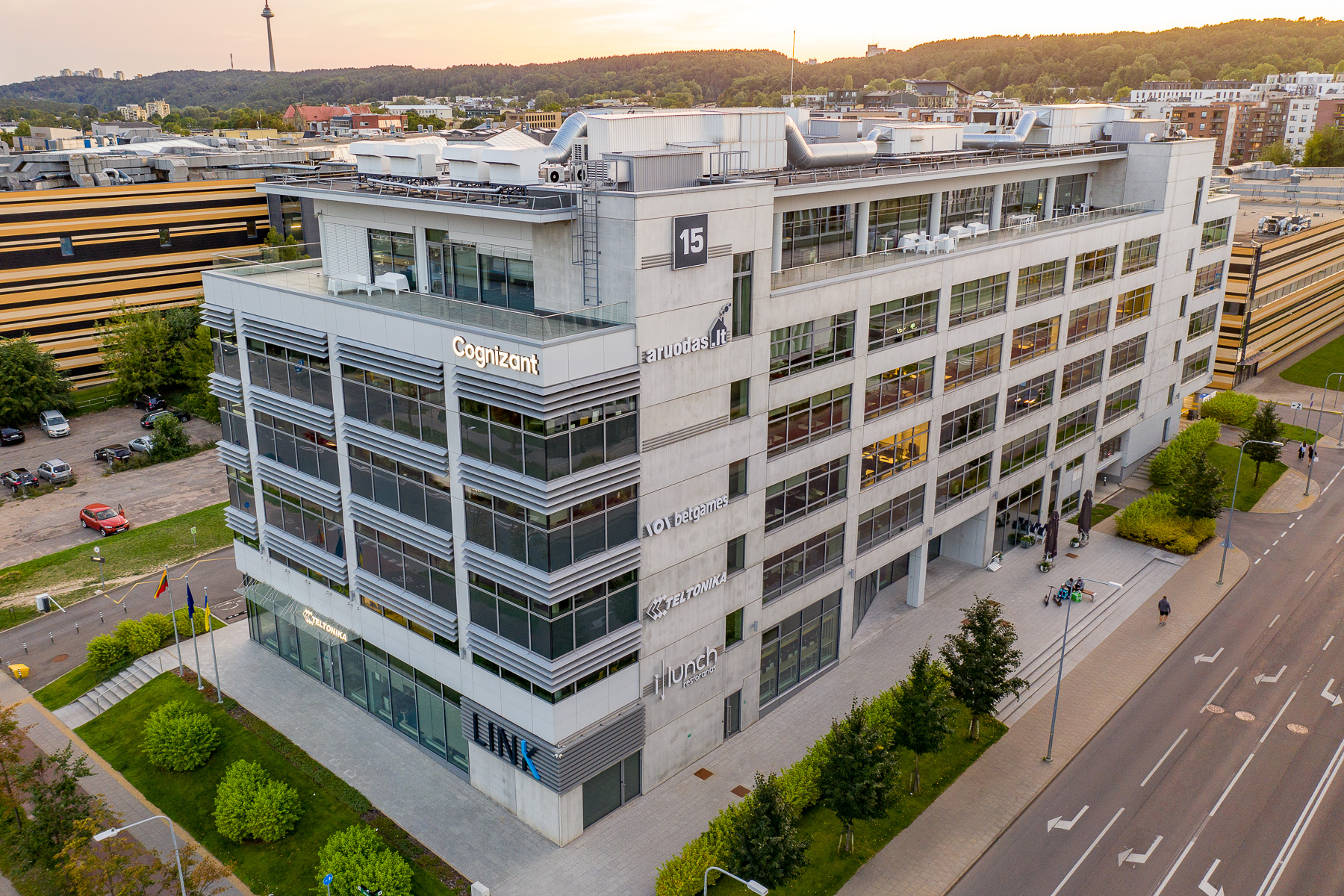
- BNS Lithuanian headquarters in Vilnius
- Industry: News agency
- Founded: 1990
- Headquarters: Tallinn, Estonia
- Number of employees: ~100
- Website: www.bns.ee (Estonia) www.bns.lt (Lithuania)

The Baltic News Service (BNS) is the largest news agency operating in the Baltic States. Founded in April 1990, by a group of students (the founding CEO was Allan Martinson), it sought to inform foreign correspondents in Moscow of developments in the Baltic States' struggles for independence from the Soviet Union. Within a few months, it had been recognized by numerous Western media sources.

== Format and purpose ==
BNS is a holding company for separate organizations in Estonia, Latvia, and Lithuania.

BNS disseminates news in Russian and English (as well as the domestic languages of Estonian, Latvian, and Lithuanian) via the internet and by other means. Subscribers include media, financial, industrial, and government institutions in the Baltic States. BNS also collaborates with Agence France-Presse, Reuters, and Interfax.

== History ==
Founded in April 1990 by a group of students, BNS was wholly owned by the Finnish media group Alma Media from 2001 until 2014. In 2003, the BNS publishing company in Estonia, BNS Kirjastus, bought the bankrupt news agency ETA (Eesti Teadeteagentuur).

In 2013, shareholders decided to exit the business leading to a chain of sales during the following year. February/March 2014 saw Estonian Uudisvoog OÜ, a subsidiary company of private capital fund Koha Capital OÜ, purchasing BNS. It was owned by the Estonian radio media mogul Ilmar Kompus who is also the proprietor of the Sky Media Group radio stations.

In May 2014, BNS was acquired by Eesti Meedia (now Postimees Group), which is owned by Estonian entrepreneur Margus Linnamäe through investment firm MM Group. In late 2015, BNS was effectively joined by LETA (Latvia's formerly state-owned news agency) when UP Invest (a subsidiary of MM Group) acquired most shares in the Latvian agency. To satisfy regulatory concerns, Eesti Meedia sold Latvian BNS operations (subsequently renamed Latvian News Service) and media monitoring service Mediju Monitorings to a third-party Estonian company named AMP Investeeringud on 31 August 2015. Later, it was discovered that most employees of the Latvian News Service and Mediju Monitorings were transferred to LETA, but was not disclosed to the Latvian authorities at the time of the acquisition. On 18 January 2019, the Competition Council of Latvia imposed a €32,200 fine on MM Group.

== See also ==
- Baltic News Network
