= Ekspress Grupp =

Company based in Estonia

- Trade name: Ekspress Grupp
- Industry: Mass media
- Founded: 1995
- Headquarters: Tallinn, Estonia
- Area served: Estonia, Latvia and Lithuania
- Revenue: €53.516 million
- Operating income: €4.409 million
- Net income: €2.257 million
- Total assets: €94.258 million
- Total equity: €53.692 million
- Website: www.egrupp.ee

Ekspress Grupp is an Estonian media and publishing company. The company's two main segments are: media segment and printing service segment.

The media segment encompasses, for example, online portal Delfi, several other news portals, publishing of newspapers, books, and magazines in Estonia. The printing service segment included Printall AS until September 2021, when it was sold to Trükitung OÜ

The company is established on 21 June 1995.

Ekspress Grupp's main subsidiaries are:

- AS Delfi Meedia: the company publishes these Estonian newspapers and magazines: Eesti Ekspress, Maaleht, Eesti Päevaleht, Laupäevaleht LP, Anne & Stiil, Eesti Naine, Oma Maitse, Kroonika, Tervis Pluss, Maakodu, Jana, Pere ja Kodu. It owns the news portal "Delfi". In 2015, the companies Eesti Ajalehed and Delfi were merged into one company called Ekspress Meedia. From September 1, 2022, the company's name became Delfi Meedia.
- A/S Delfi
- UAB Delfi
- SIA Biļešu Paradize
- AS Õhtuleht Kirjastus
- UAB Digital Matter
- SIA Altero
- Babahh Media OÜ
- Kinnisvarakeskkond OÜ
- Linna Ekraanid OÜ
- SIA D Screens
- OÜ Hea Lugu
- AS Printall
- AS Express Post.

In the past, the Ekspress Grupp owned the Estonian information telephone Ekspress Hotline and the bookstore chain Rahva Raamat.

Since 2007, the company is listed in Nasdaq Tallinn.

As of November 17, 2011, Hans H. Luik's holding company HHL Rühm OÜ owned 27.01% of Ekspress Group's shares, and Hans H. Luik as a private individual owned 26.72% of Ekspress Group's shares.
