= Haabersti =

District of Tallinn, Estonia

- District of Tallinn
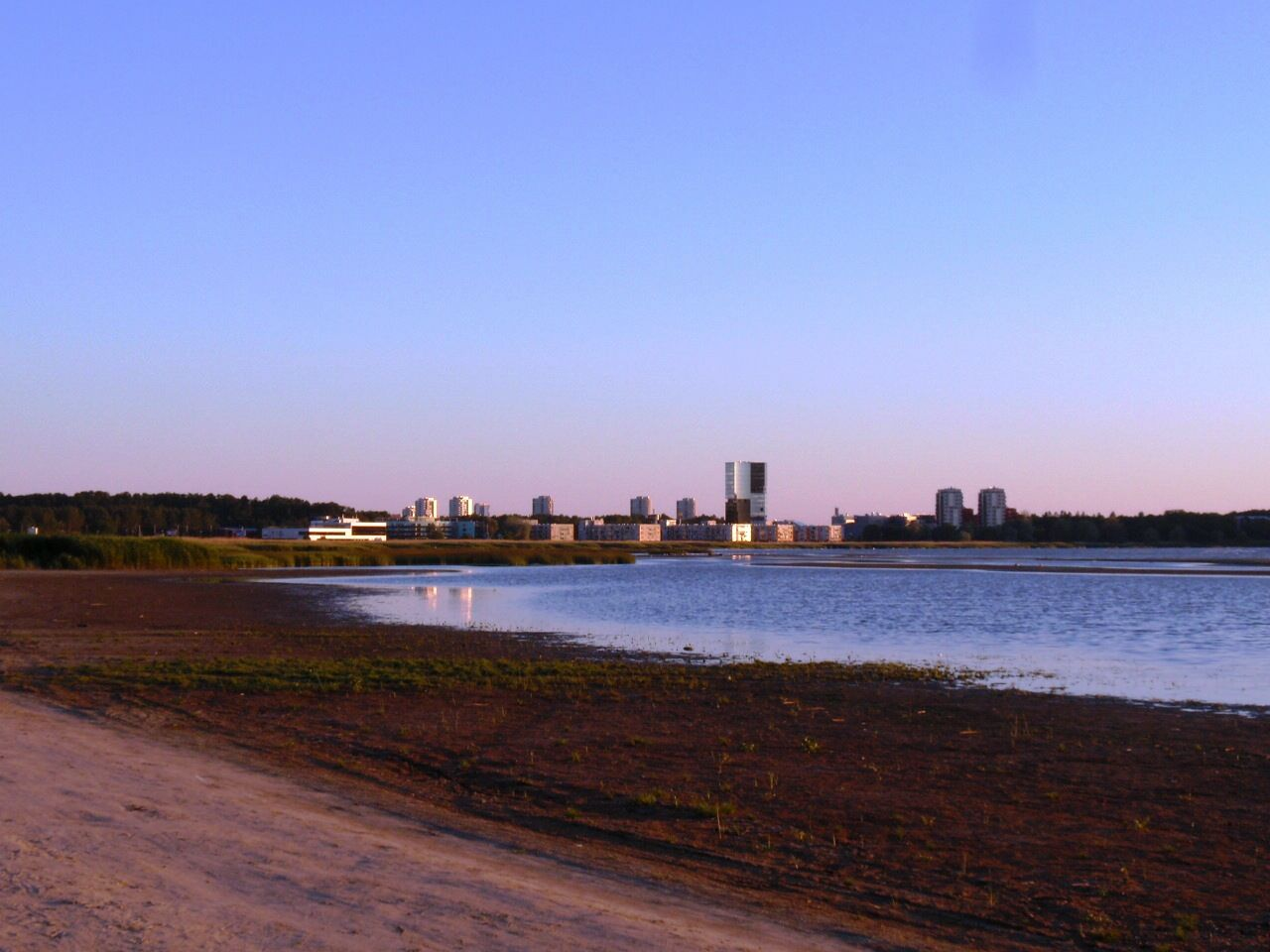
- View at the center of Haabersti from the Stroomi Beach (Pelguranna).

- Flag Coat of arms

- Location of Haabersti in Tallinn.
- Coordinates: 59°24′51″N 24°38′49″E
- Country: Estonia
- County: Harju County
- City: Tallinn

Government
  - District Elder: Anna Levandi (Isamaa)

Area
  - Total: 18.6 km^{2} (7.2 sq mi)

Population (01.11.2014)
  - Total: 43,916
  - Density: 2,360/km^{2} (6,120/sq mi)
- Website: tallinn.ee

Haabersti (German: Habers) is one of the 8 administrative districts (Estonian: linnaosa) of Tallinn, the capital of Estonia.

Haabersti is divided into 12 subdistricts (Estonian: asum): Astangu, Haabersti, Kakumäe, Mustjõe, Mäeküla, Õismäe, Pikaliiva, Rocca al Mare, Tiskre, Veskimetsa, Vismeistri and Väike-Õismäe.

The most populous part of the district is Väike-Õismäe, a residential area consisting of big panel houses which were mostly built in the 1970s. Lake Harku and an extensive beach area at Kakumäe and the Kopli Bay lie within the boundaries of the district. Since most of the territory has not been previously used for building, new areas with small residential buildings have developed in the last two decades.

Haabersti is home to the Estonian Open Air Museum, Saku Suurhall, Tallinn Zoo, and Rocca al Mare Shopping Center.

== Population ==
Haabersti has a population of 43,916 (As of 1 November 2014).

Ethnic composition 1989-2021
Ethnicity	1989		2000		2011		2021	
Ethnicity	amount	%	amount	%	amount	%	amount	%
Estonians	19349	44.1	19316	51.7	21915	52.6	23793	50.9
Russians	19058	43.5	14081	37.7	16361	39.2	18365	39.3
Ukrainians	-	-	-	-	1370	3.29	1687	3.61
Belarusians	-	-	-	-	711	1.71	730	1.56
Finns	-	-	-	-	253	0.61	262	0.56
Jews	-	-	-	-	191	0.46	186	0.40
Latvians	-	-	-	-	71	0.17	117	0.25
Germans	-	-	-	-	46	0.11	69	0.15
Tatars	-	-	-	-	122	0.29	114	0.24
Poles	-	-	-	-	82	0.20	77	0.16
Lithuanians	-	-	-	-	81	0.19	112	0.24
unknown	0	0.00	351	0.94	44	0.11	204	0.44
other	5452	12.4	3646	9.75	447	1.07	1034	2.21
Total	43859	100	37394	100	41694	100	46750	100

Population development
Year	2004	2005	2006	2007	2008	2009	2010	2011	2012	2013	2014
Population	37,187	38,267	38,968	38,956	39,587	40,454	41,051	41,549	42,294	42,839	43,571
