= Väike-Õismäe =

Subdistrict of Tallinn, Estonia

- Subdistrict of Tallinn
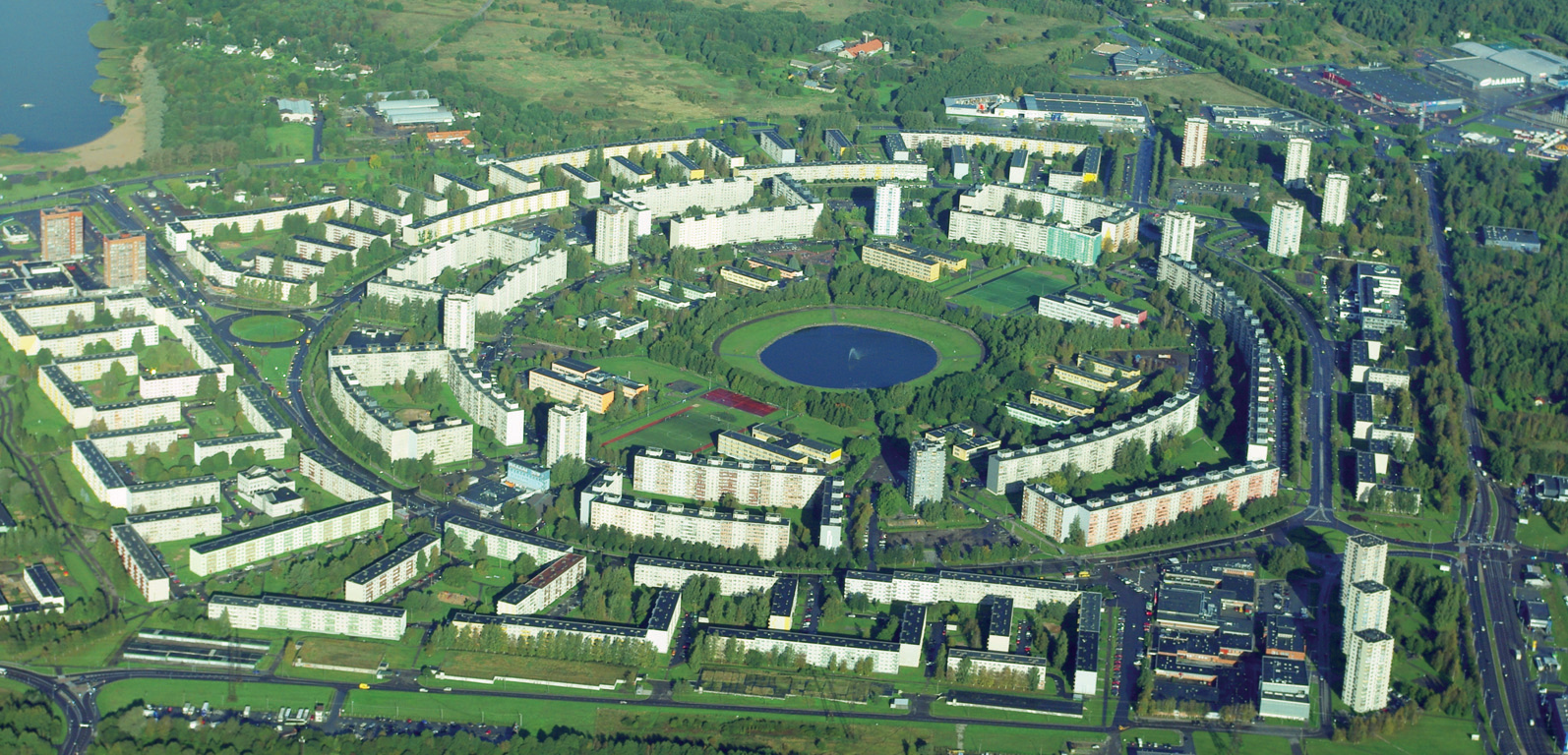
- Aerial view of Väike-Õismäe.

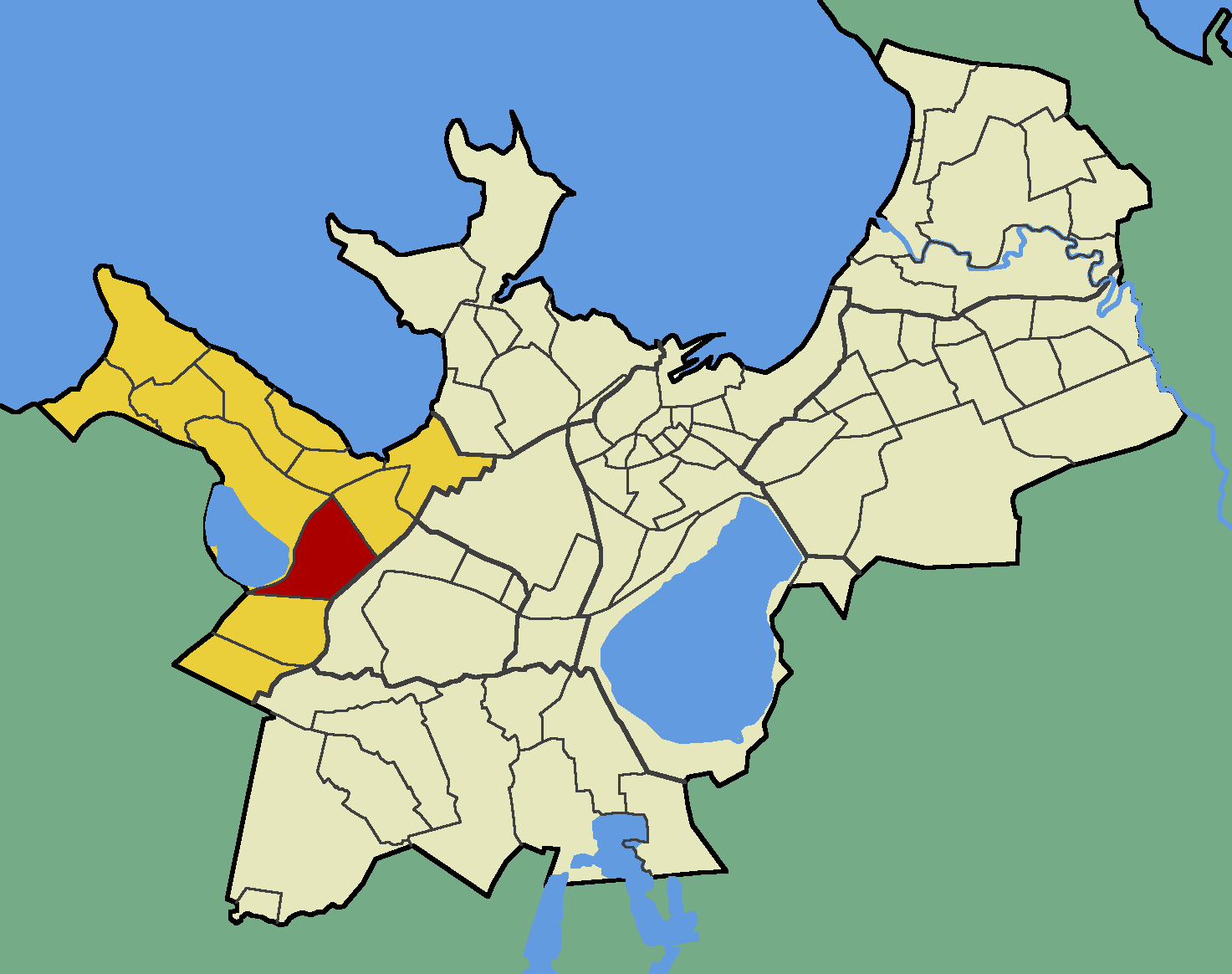
- Väike-Õismäe within Haabersti District.
- Coordinates: 59°24′47″N 24°38′42″E
- Country: Estonia
- County: Harju County
- City: Tallinn
- District: Haabersti

Population (01.01.2015)
  - Total: 27,481

Väike-Õismäe is a subdistrict (Estonian: asum) in the district of Haabersti, Tallinn, the capital of Estonia. It has a population of 27,481 (as of 1 January 2015). thus housing more than 60% of Haabersti's population. Väike-Õismäe is a compact microdistrict with an oval shape, built in the 1970s (architect Mart Port).

Väike-Õismäe is often informally called just Õismäe, but officially Õismäe refers to a nearby older subdistrict with a much smaller population.

== In popular culture ==
- The film anthology "Soviet Estonia" No. 8 (1975) shows a story about a subbotnik in Väike-Õismäe. It was filmed at the Tallinnfilm studio (Heli Speek as director, Semyon Semyonovich Shkolnikov as cameraman).

== Gallery ==
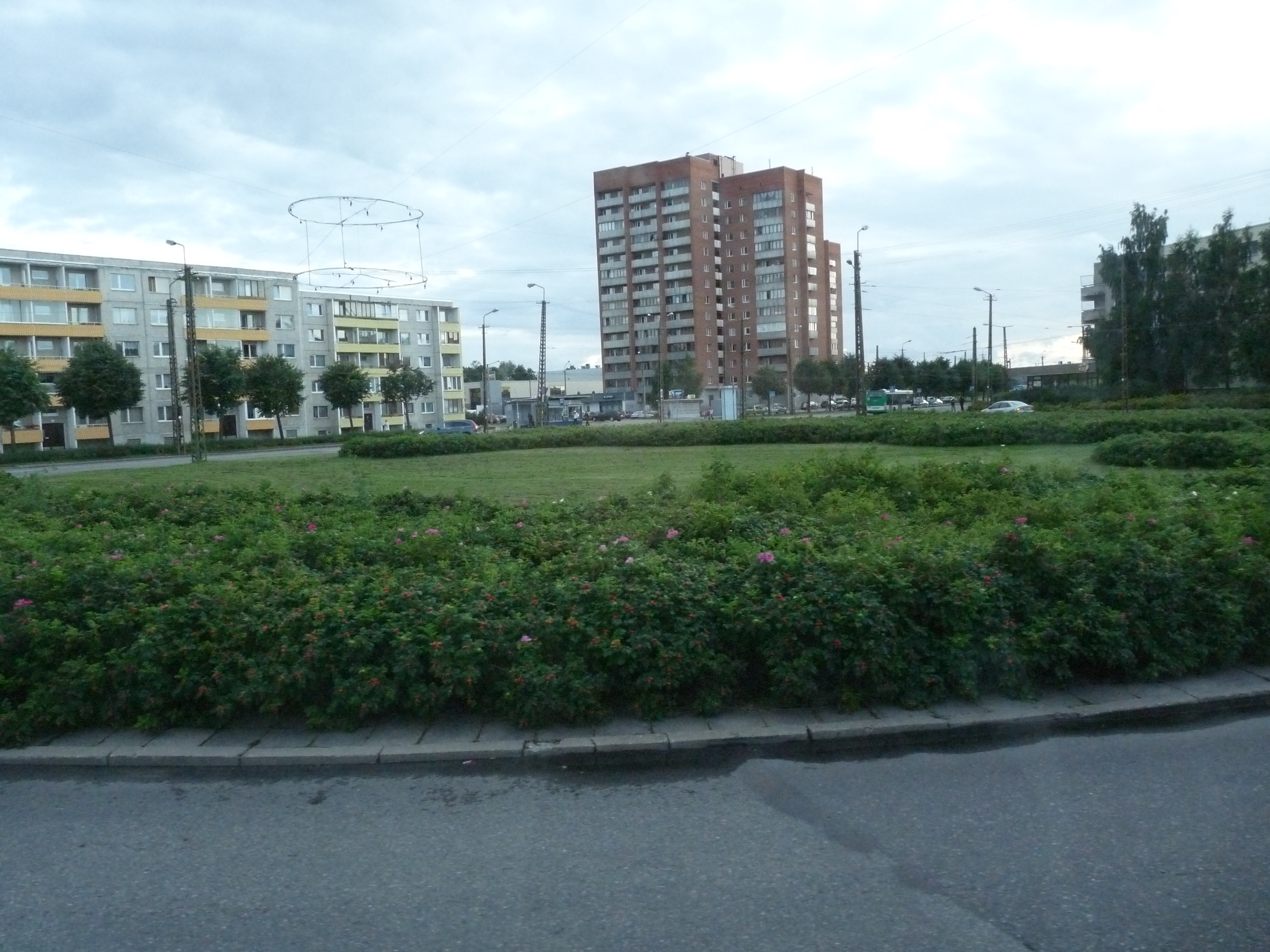

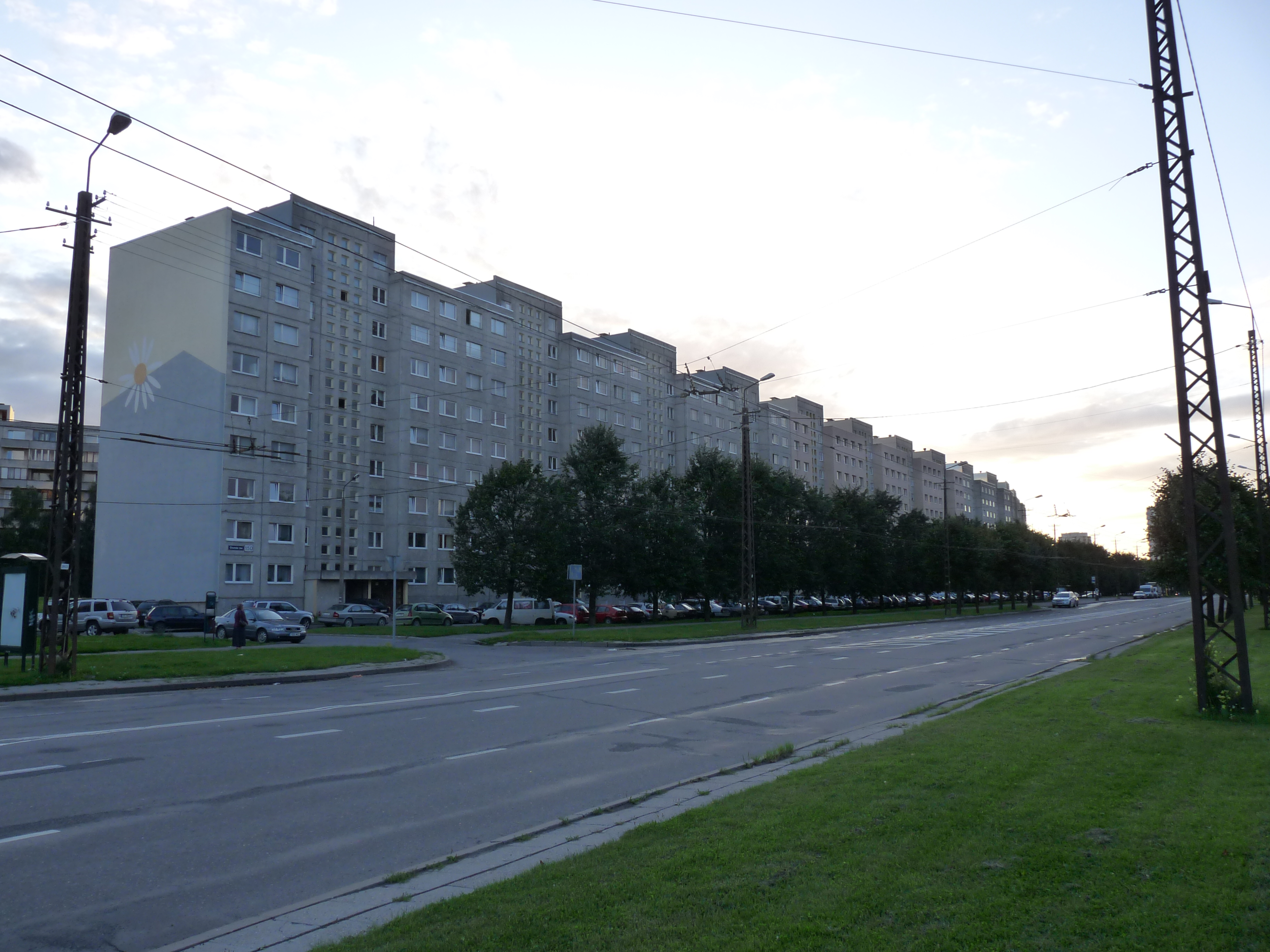

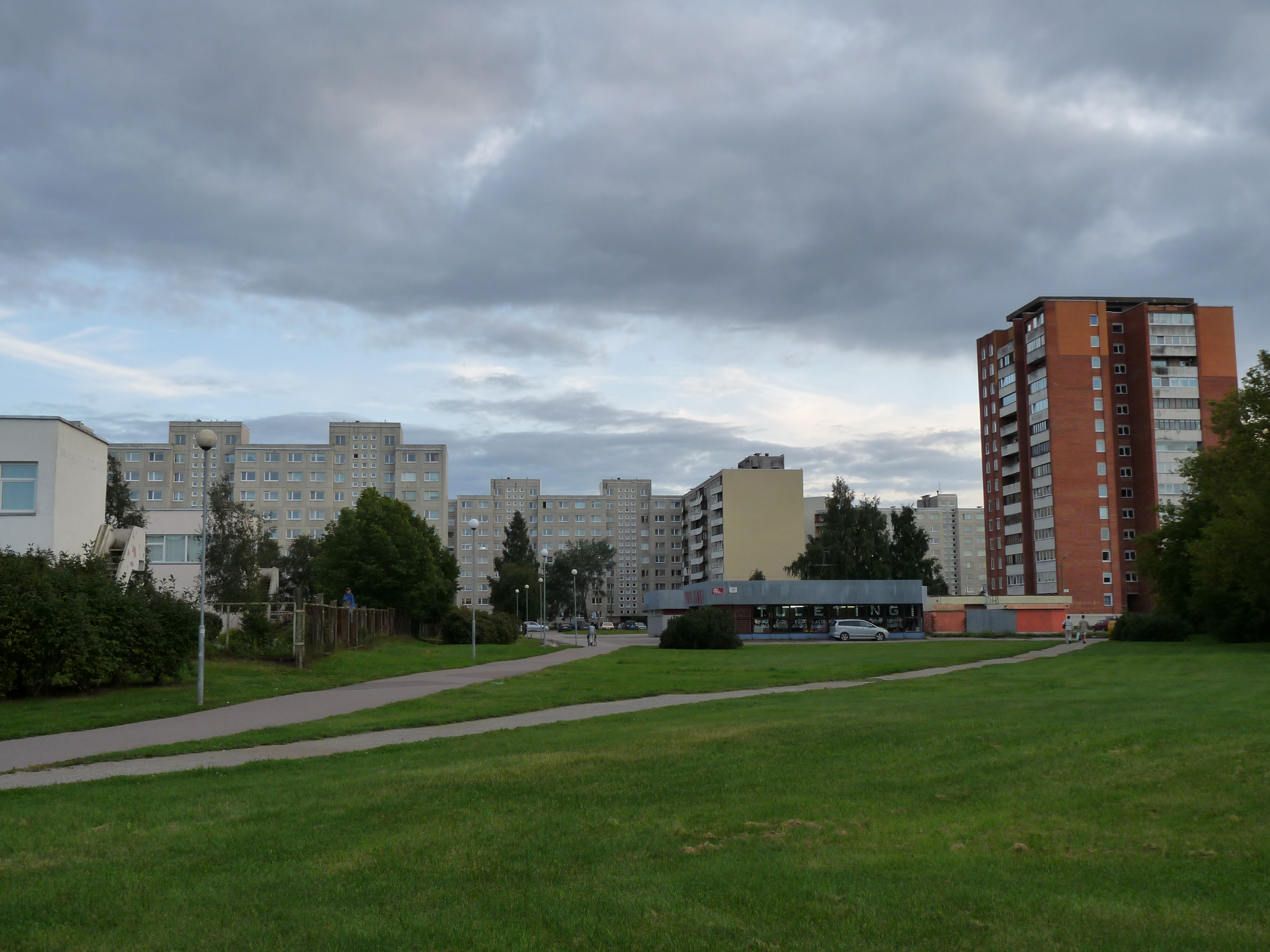

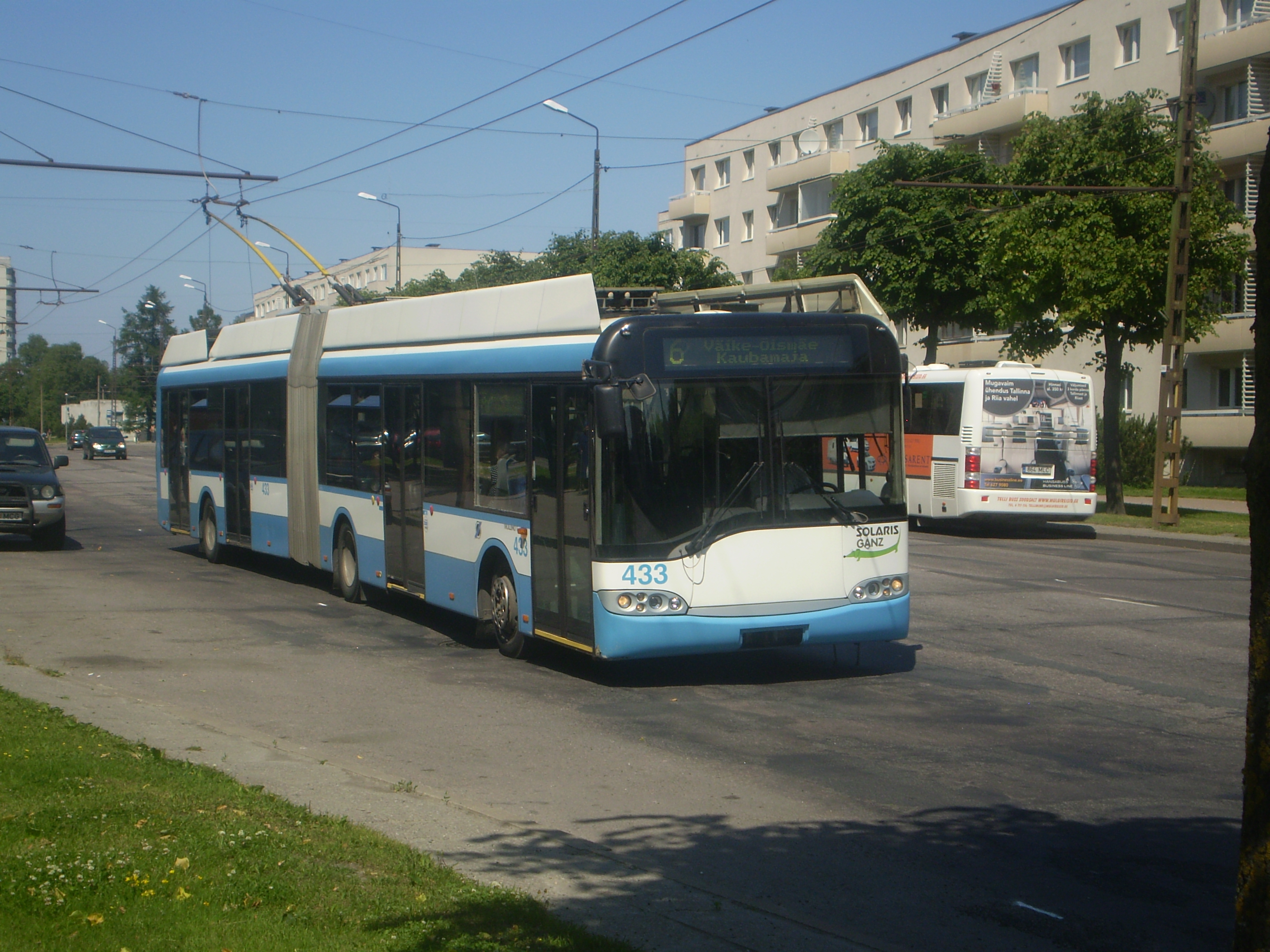

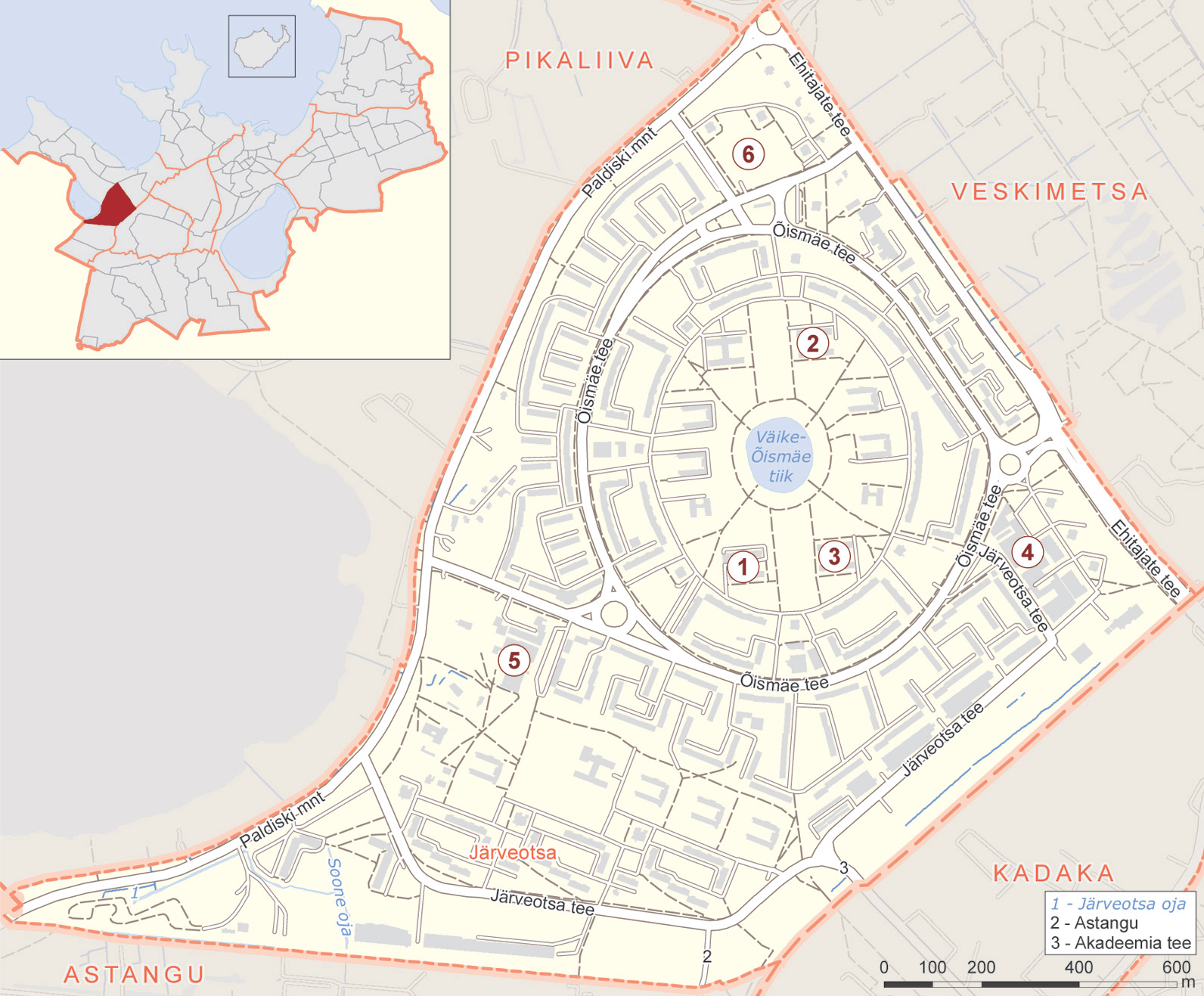
Map of Väike-Õismäe

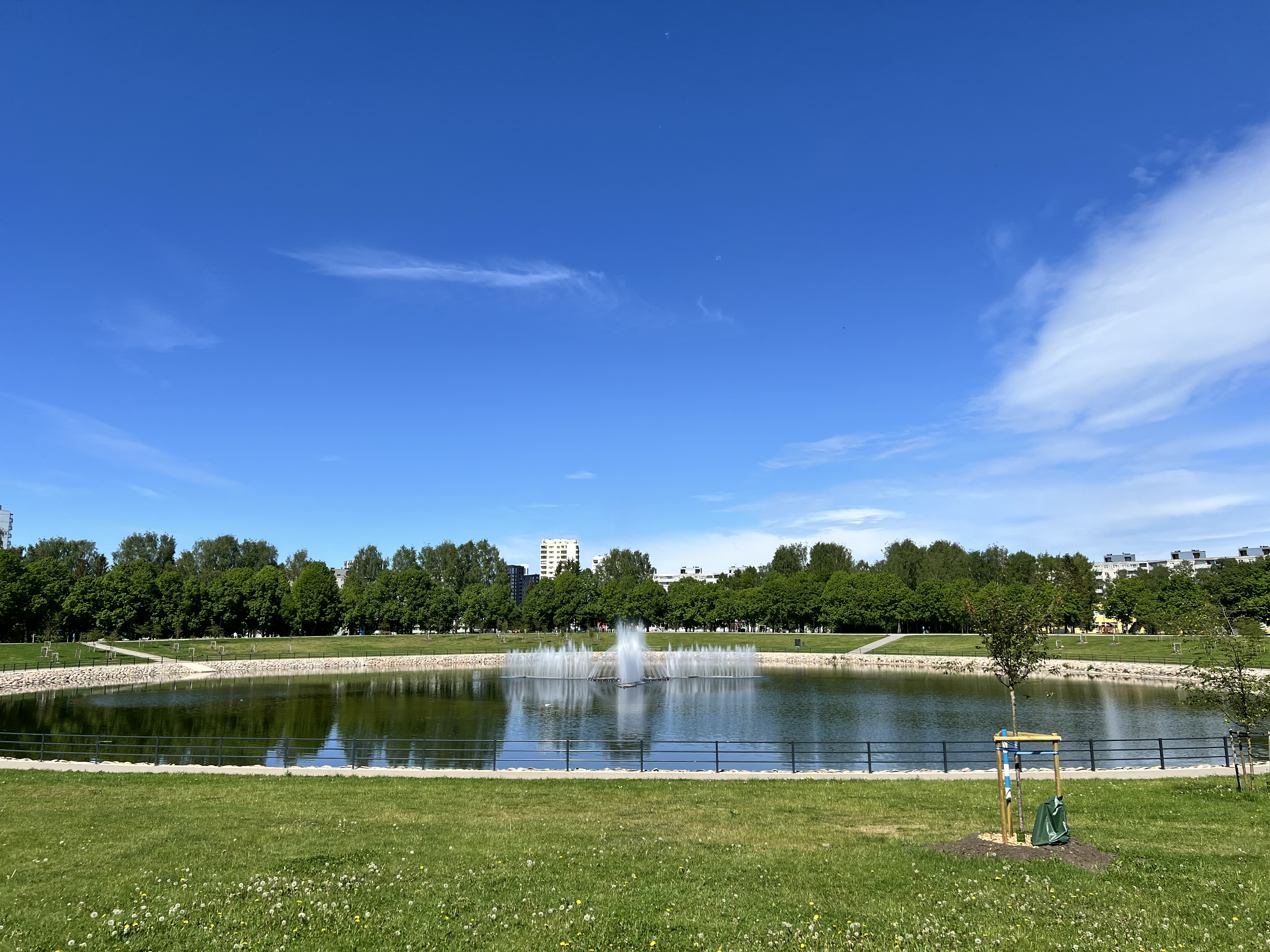
Õismäe Pond
