= Aleksei Rjabkov =

Estonian serial killer

- Born: December 29, 1964 (age 61); Estonian SSR
- Convictions: Murder x3 Manslaughter
- Penalty: 15 years (1995); 13 years (2009)

Details
- Victims: 4
- Span of crimes: 1995–2009
- Country: Estonia
- State: Harju
- Date apprehended: For the final time on March 13, 2009

Aleksei Rjabkov (born December 29, 1964) is an Estonian serial killer who, together with several accomplices, murdered four people in Harju County from 1995 to 2009. His case is considered notorious due to his lenient sentences and his committing violent crimes after his early release.

== 1990s crimes ==
In late 1994, Rjabkov got into an argument with two brothers named Vladimir and Dmitri over debts and women. Angered by their interaction, he decided to kill both, enlisting the help of another acquaintance named Aleksandr Tronin. In early January, he bought a TT pistol from a friend named Yuri, and on January 15, he and Tronin lured the brothers to a forest near Kehra. Once there, Rjabkov fired two shots at Dmitri, before proceeding to shoot Vladimir three times, killing both. He and Tronin then hid the bodies.

On March 26, together with his 24-year-old brother Deniss and 33-year-old friend Lev Šmõrov, the trio went to the AS Krooning gas station on Paldiski Road in Tallinn. Deniss acted as the getaway driver, while Rjabkov and Šmõrov went inside, ostensibly to buy cigarettes. They came face-to-face with two clerks, Aivar and Eeno, shooting the former non-fatally while the latter was hit in the heart, dying on the spot. Rjabkov and Šmõrov then stole 1,500 kroon and left. Aivar survived his injuries, but the bullet was left lodged in his spine.

=== Prosecution and sentence ===
Four days after the murder, Rjabkov and all three of his accomplices were arrested and charged with the respective crimes after the criminals' car was linked to a recent robbery. Unable to deal with the pressure, Tronin hanged himself at his cell in solitary confinement on April 13, leaving behind a suicide note in which he implicated Rjabkov as the shooter and himself as the killer of two taxi cab drivers in unrelated incidents.

Tronin's letter later aided the prosecutors in securing a plea bargain with Rjabkov, who confessed to the murders and attempted murder in exchange for a more lenient sentence of 15 years. His brother and Šmõrov, who both received 9 years imprisonment, appealed their verdicts, with only the latter succeeding in getting a small reduction of one and a half years.

== Release ==
Despite the protests of his surviving victim and the prosecutor, as well as the fact that he had a total of 23 infractions committed during his imprisonment, Rjabkov was granted parole in 2007, three years before his scheduled release. His parole conditions mandated that he keep a stable employment, due to which he spent most of the year working as an electrician.

However, by late 2008, he suffered several personal losses, as he was fired from his job, developed an addiction to alcohol, frequently quarreled with his wife, his health rapidly deteriorated and his younger brother was murdered. Rjabkov soon moved out of his home and settled by Harku Lake, where he lived in a tent. On November 12, he was brought before the court to face charges for two misdemeanors - however, he convinced them that he was still employed and had agreed to seek treatment for his alcoholism, due to which the judges ordered him to be released. On January 9, 2009, he was detained for six days in relation to a rape case, but was again released due to a lack of evidence.

=== New murder ===
Ever since his release, Rjabkov had befriended 35-year-old Valeri Kornatšjov, a fellow murderer who had also been released from prison. The pair often drank alcohol together, soon befriending a 49-year-old man named Stepan. The trio often visited Stepan's apartment, sometimes accompanied by Kornatšjov's girlfriend. There were claims that Stepan had made inappropriate comments about her in Kornatšjov's presence, after which the latter had threatened his new friend if he did not quit.

Between January 11 and February 3, Rjabkov, Kornatšjov and Stepan were drinking at Rjabkov's tent near Harku Lake when they got into an argument. In their drunken stupor, Rjabkov and Kornatšjov beat Stepan to death. They returned a few days later, whereupon Rjabkov dismembered the remains, stuffed them inside a plastic bag and then disposed of them in the nearby field. Kornatšjov stole four golden crowns from the victim's teeth, which he later sold at a pawn shop.

Stepan's remains were found on March 3, and ten days later, both Rjabkov and Kornatšjov were arrested and charged with his murder. Soon after their arrests, newspaper outlets wrote articles expressing outrage at Rjabkov's early release, blaming the policies of the then-Minister of Justice Rein Lang, who had previously stated that he wished to reduce the number of prisoners to keep up with "Nordic statistics" of low incarceration.

At their joint trial, neither Rjabkov nor Kornatšjov was able to provide a concrete reason as to why they had killed Stepan, claiming that they had been drunk at the time. Their attorney eventually convinced the judge that the murder charge could not be proven, leading it to be reduced to manslaughter instead. As a result, Rjabkov was sentenced to 13 years imprisonment, while Kornatšjov received 8 years, in addition to both being required to pay a high amount of krooni for the trial proceedings.

== Imprisonment and status ==
Following his imprisonment, Rjabkov was remanded to serve his prison sentence, with a scheduled release date in March 2022. He filed a petition to be released early in June 2021, but it was unanimously denied by the court, fearing a repeat of his previous crimes. No information about him has surfaced since then, but due to the passage of time, it is presumed that he has been released.

== See also ==
- List of serial killers by country
