= Aleksander Stern =

Estonian physician and politician

Aleksander Stern (born 6 January 1948 in Kuressaare) is an Estonia physician and politician. He was a member of the VIII and IX Riigikogu.

Stern's father, Károly Stern, moved to Estonia from Hungary in 1935 and was a long-time director of the Tallinn Zoo. He graduated from Tartu State University's Department of Medicine in 1972.
