= Astangu =

Subdistrict of Tallinn, Estonia

Coordinates: 59.404245°N 24.636138°E

- Subdistrict of Tallinn
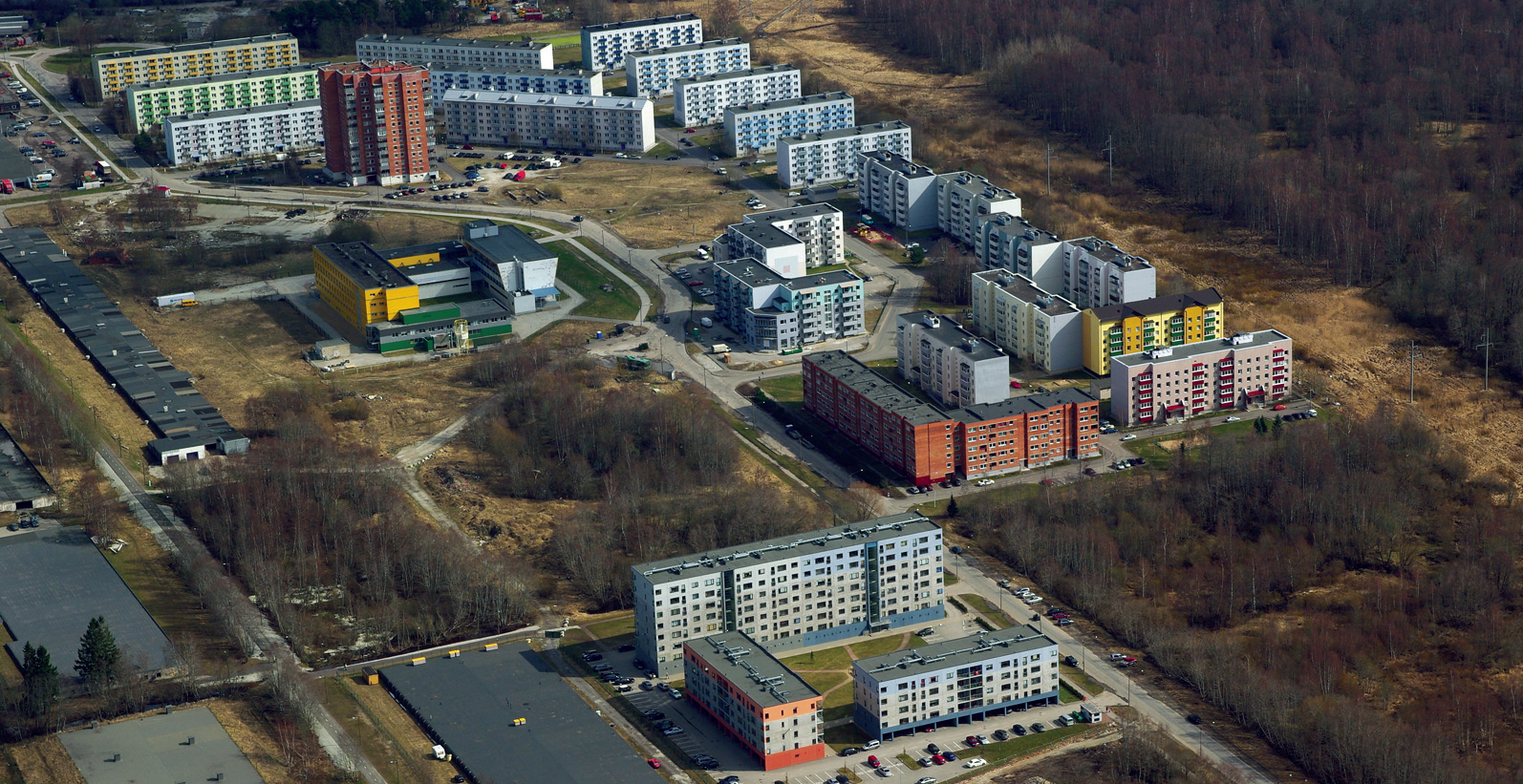
- Aerial view of the central part of Astangu.

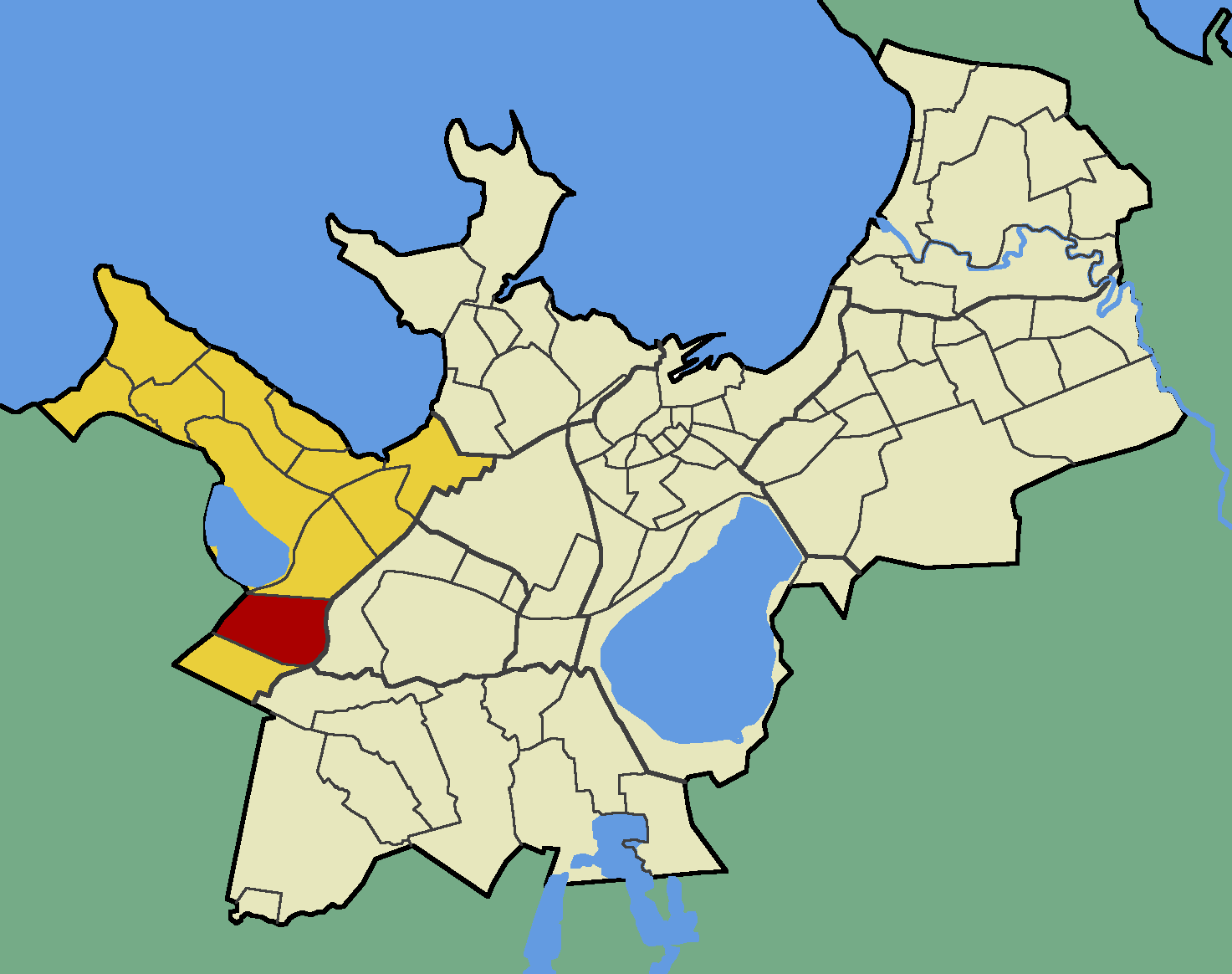
- Astangu within Haabersti District.
- Country: Estonia
- County: Harju County
- City: Tallinn
- District: Haabersti

Population (01.01.2015)
  - Total: 3,274

Astangu (Estonian for "Terrace") is a subdistrict (Estonian: asum) in the district of Haabersti, Tallinn, the capital of Estonia. It has a population of 3,274 (as of 1 January 2015).

== Gallery ==
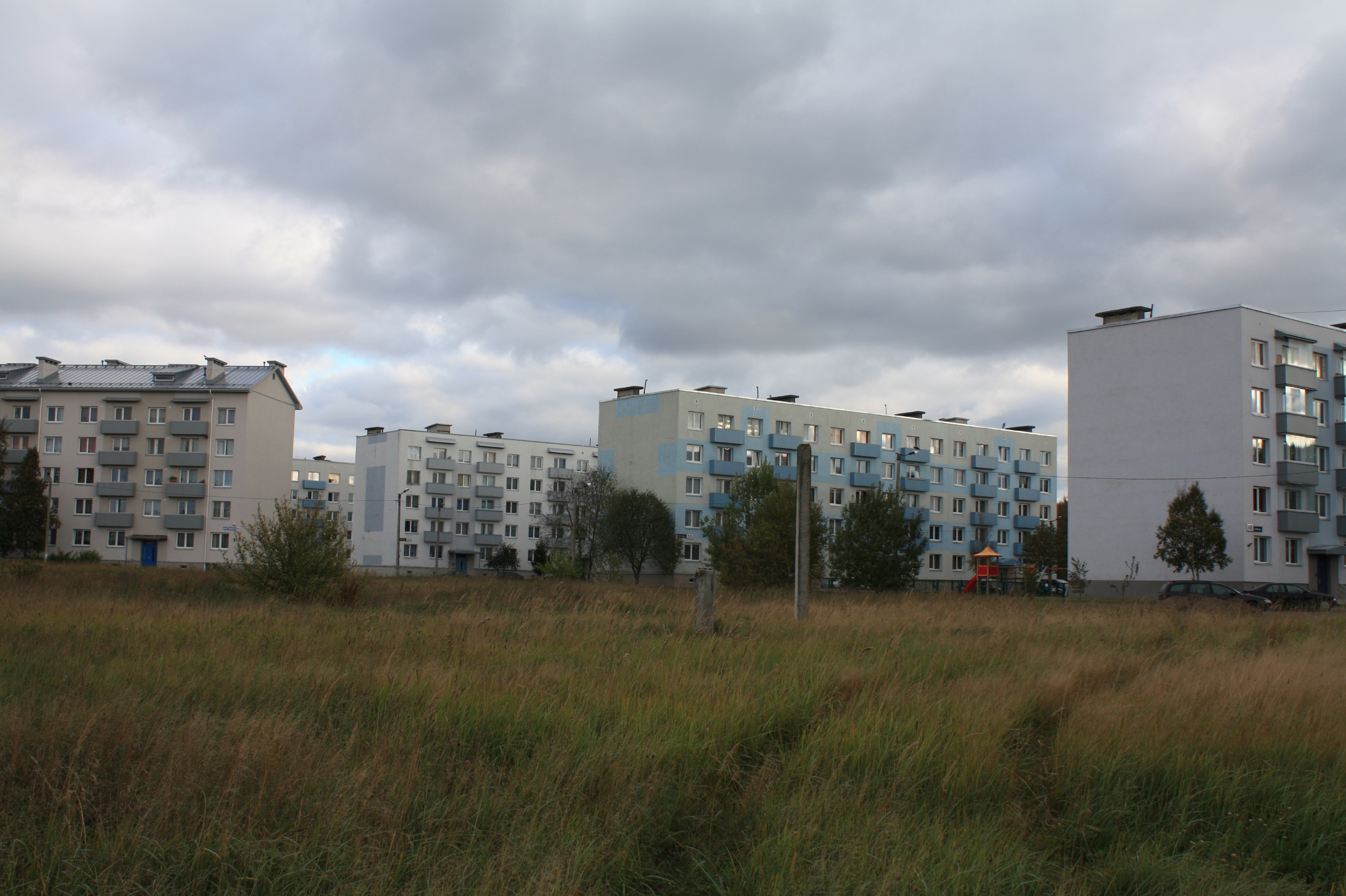
Typical Soviet era apartment buildings in Astangu

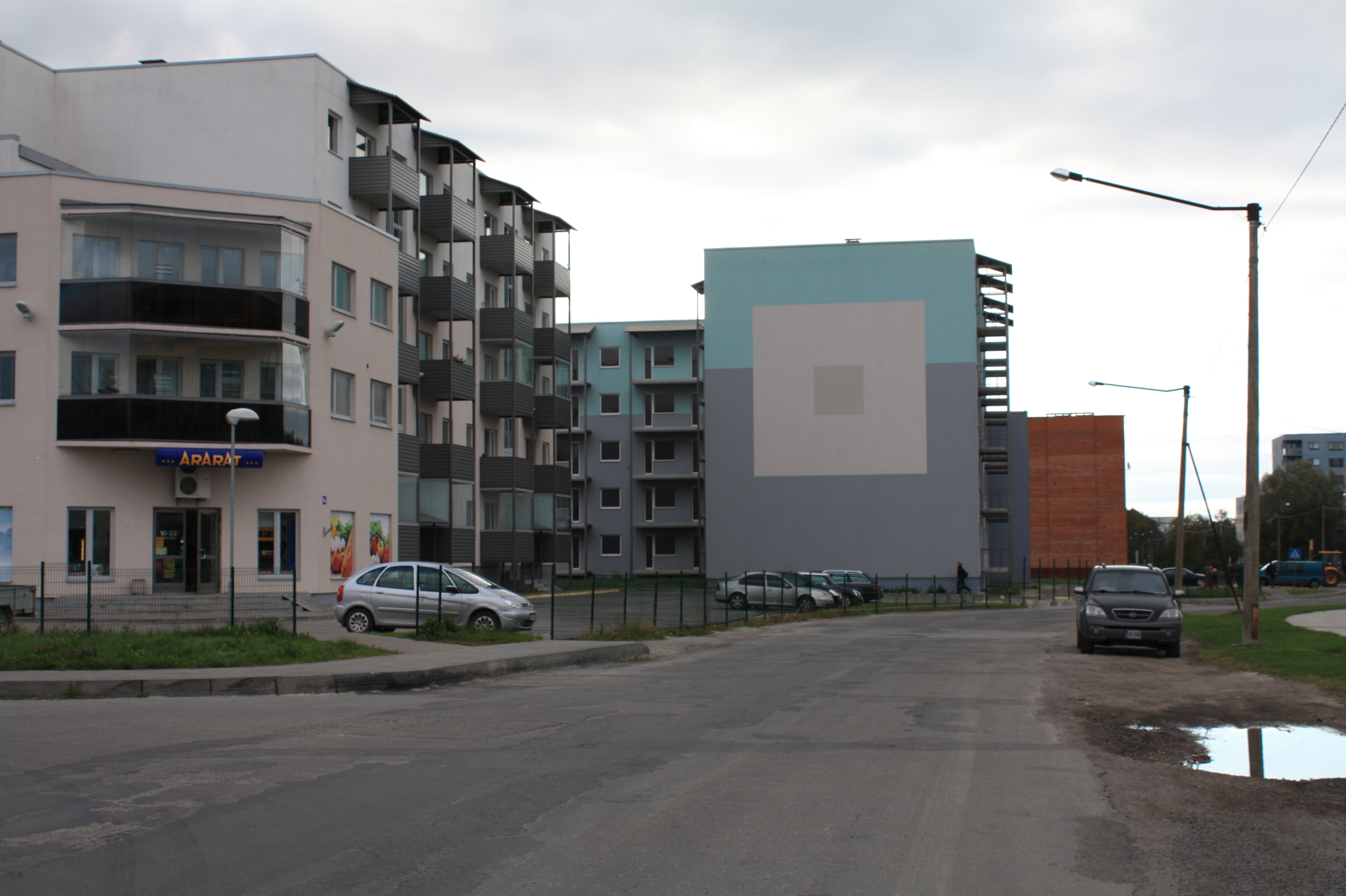
New apartment buildings

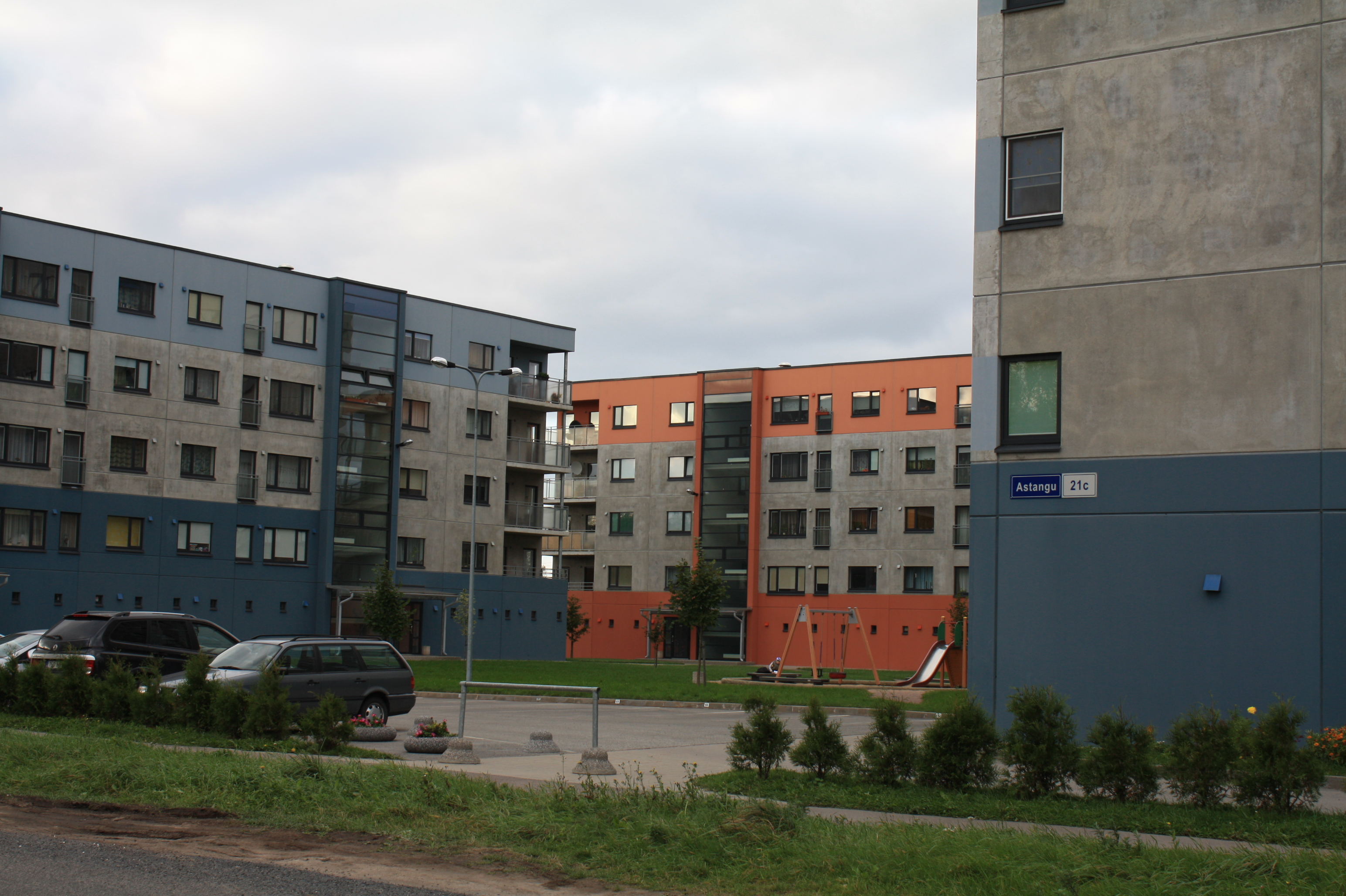
