= Mäeküla, Tallinn =

Subdistrict of Tallinn, Estonia

Coordinates: 59°23′42.4″N 24°36′21″E

Mäeküla
- Subdistrict of Tallinn
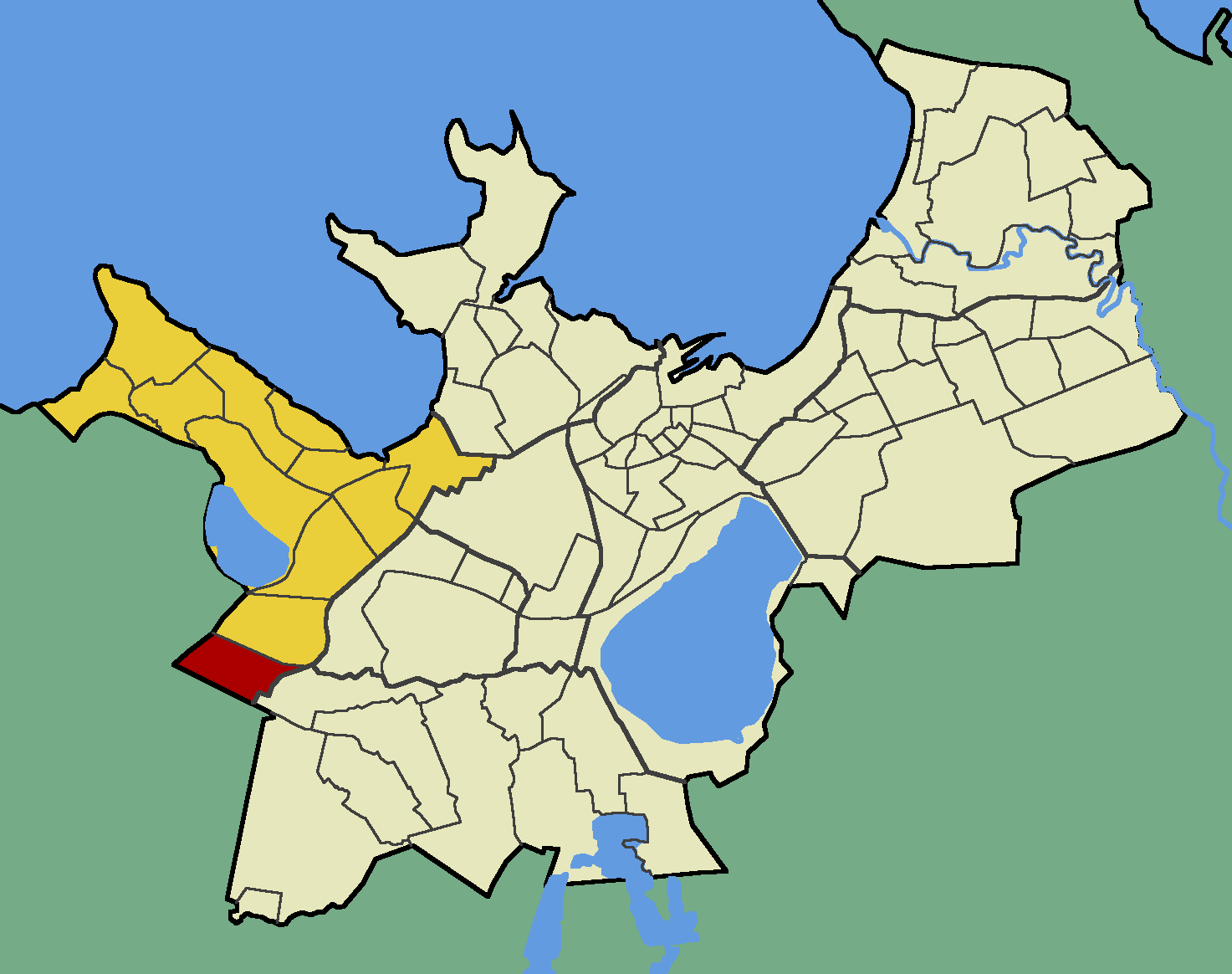
- Mäeküla within Haabersti District.
- Country: Estonia
- County: Harju County
- City: Tallinn
- District: Haabersti

Population (2014-01-01)
  - Total: 2

Mäeküla (Estonian for "Hill Village") is a subdistrict (Estonian: asum) in the district of Haabersti, Tallinn, the capital of Estonia. It has a population of 2 (as of 1 January 2014).
