= Veskimetsa =

Subdistrict of Tallinn, Estonia

Coordinates: 59°25′8.46″N 24°39′43.39″E

- Subdistrict of Tallinn
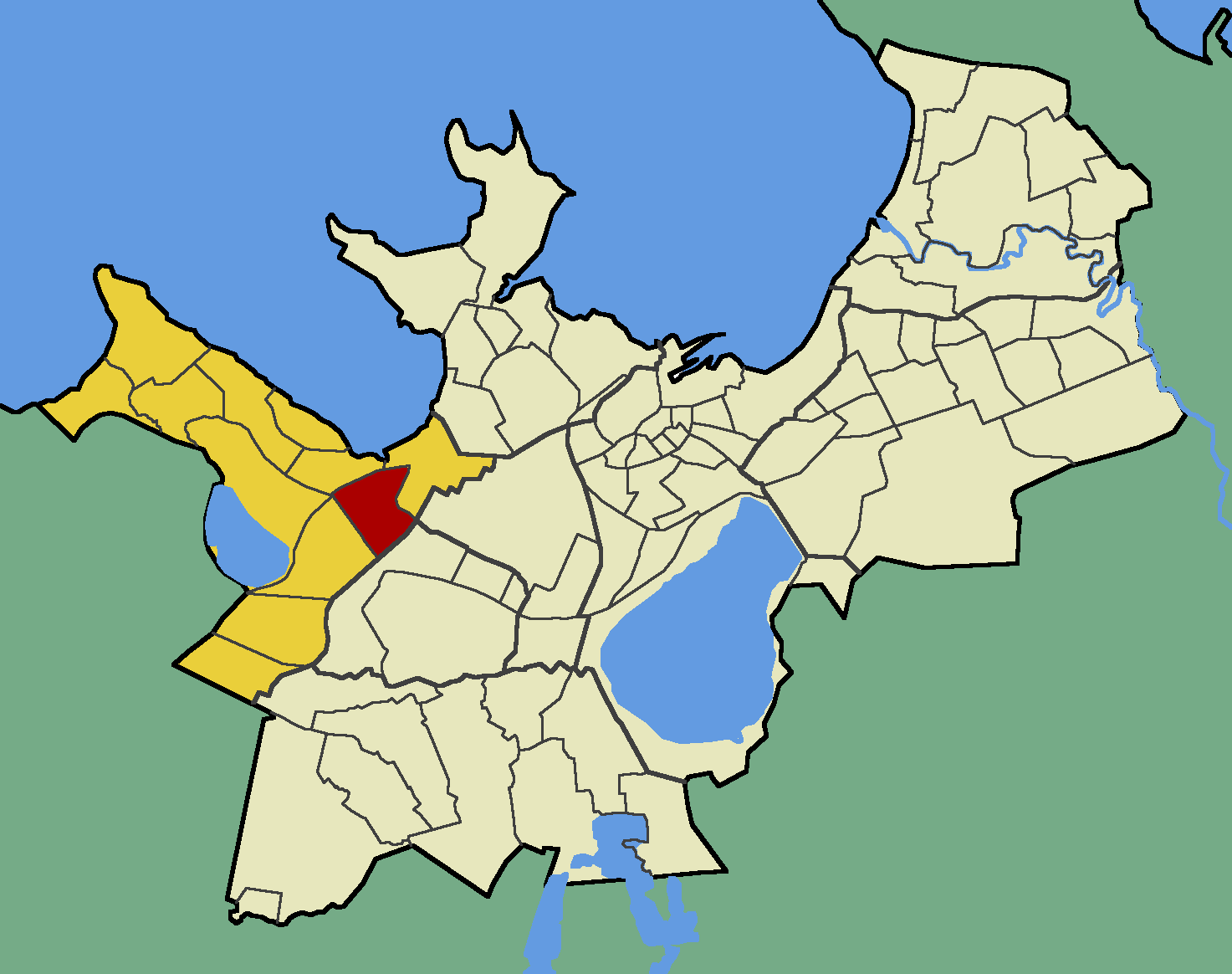
- Veskimetsa within Haabersti District.
- Country: Estonia
- County: Harju County
- City: Tallinn
- District: Haabersti

Population (01.01.2014)
  - Total: 17

Veskimetsa (Estonian for "Mill Forest") is a subdistrict (Estonian: asum) in the district of Haabersti, Tallinn, the capital of Estonia. It has a population of 17 (as of 1 January 2014). It is mainly covered by the area of the Tallinn Zoo.
