= Tiskre, Tallinn =

Subdistrict of Tallinn/Tallina, Estonia

Coordinates: 59°26′19″N 24°34′19.34″E

Tiskre
- Subdistrict of Tallinn
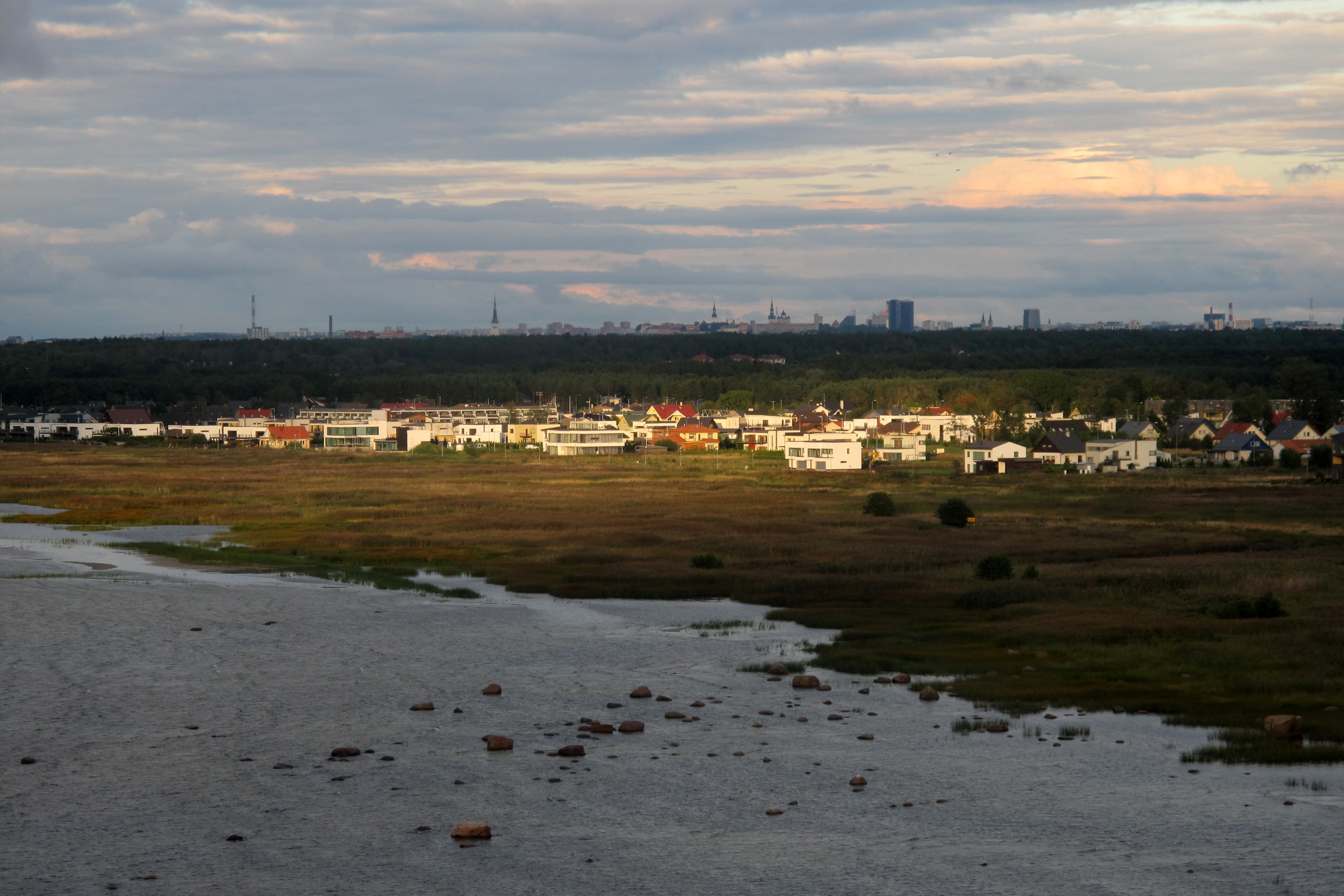

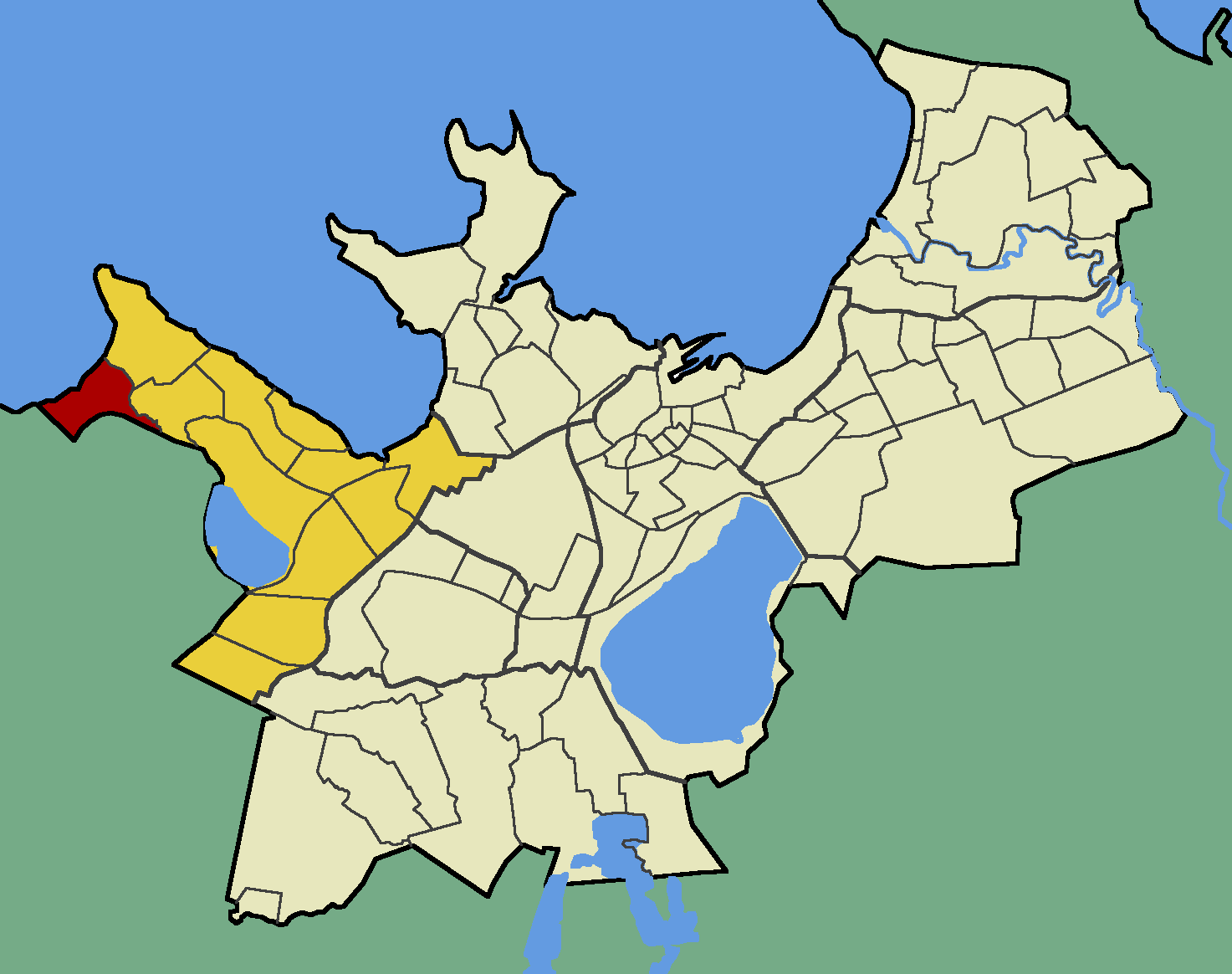
- Tiskre within Haabersti District.
- Country: Estonia
- County: Harju County
- City: Tallinn
- District: Haabersti

Population (01.01.2014)
  - Total: 1,837

Tiskre is a subdistrict (Estonian: asum) in the district of Haabersti, Tallinn, the capital of Estonia. It has a population of 1,837 (as of 1 January 2014). It is the westernmost subdistrict of Tallinn.

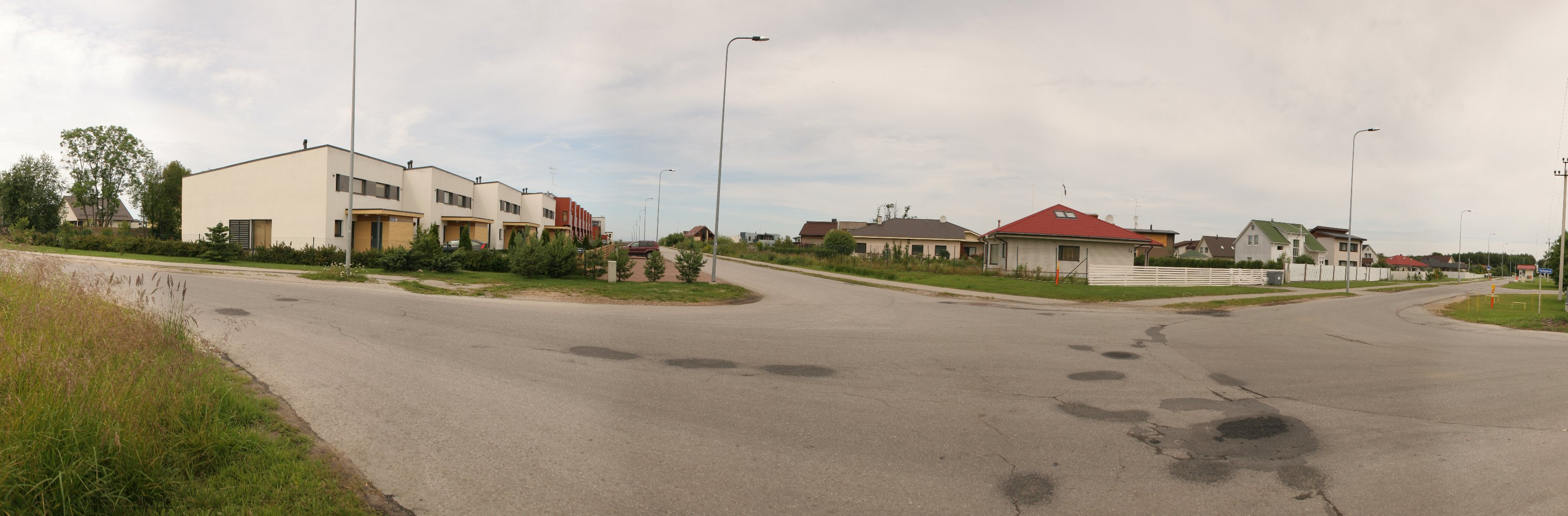

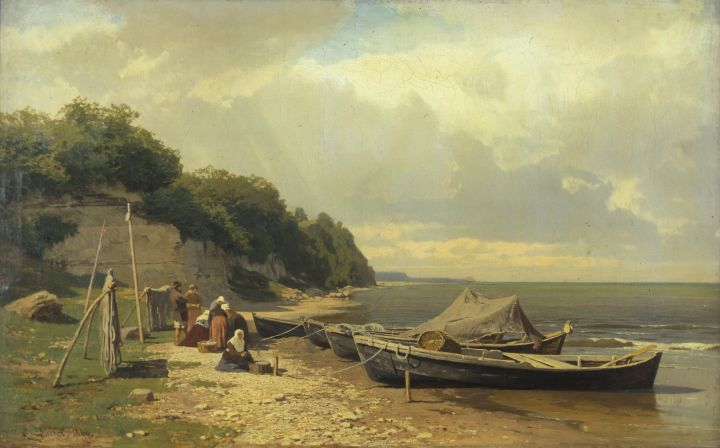
Seashore at Tiskre, painting by Eugen Dücker, 1866.
