= Vismeistri =

Subdistrict of Tallinn, Estonia

Coordinates: 59°26′22.83″N 24°35′51.88″E

- Subdistrict of Tallinn
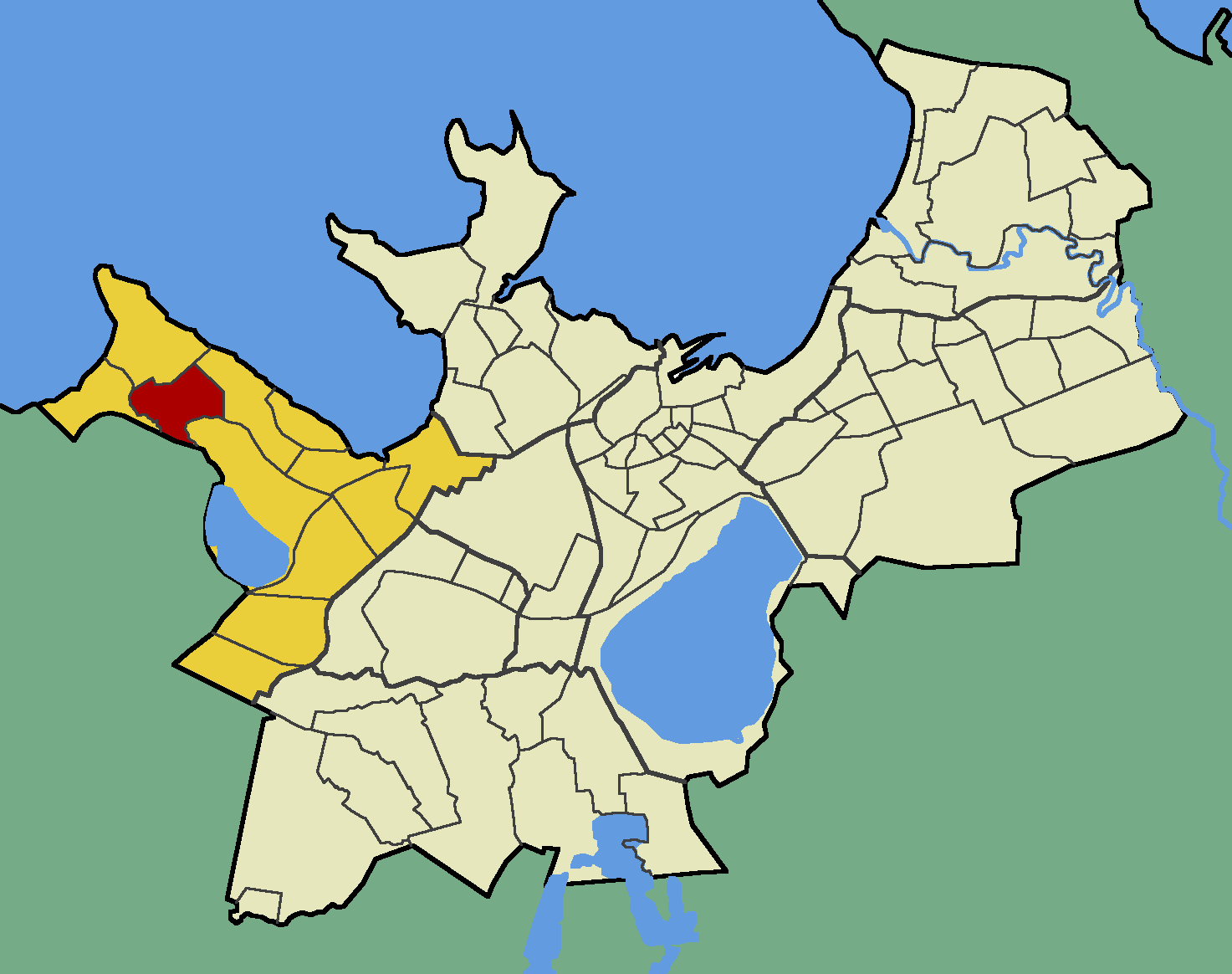
- Vismeistri within Haabersti District.
- Country: Estonia
- County: Harju County
- City: Tallinn
- District: Haabersti

Population (01.01.2015)
  - Total: 1,864

Vismeistri is a subdistrict (Estonian: asum) in the district of Haabersti, Tallinn, the capital of Estonia. It has a population of 1,864 (as of 1 January 2015).

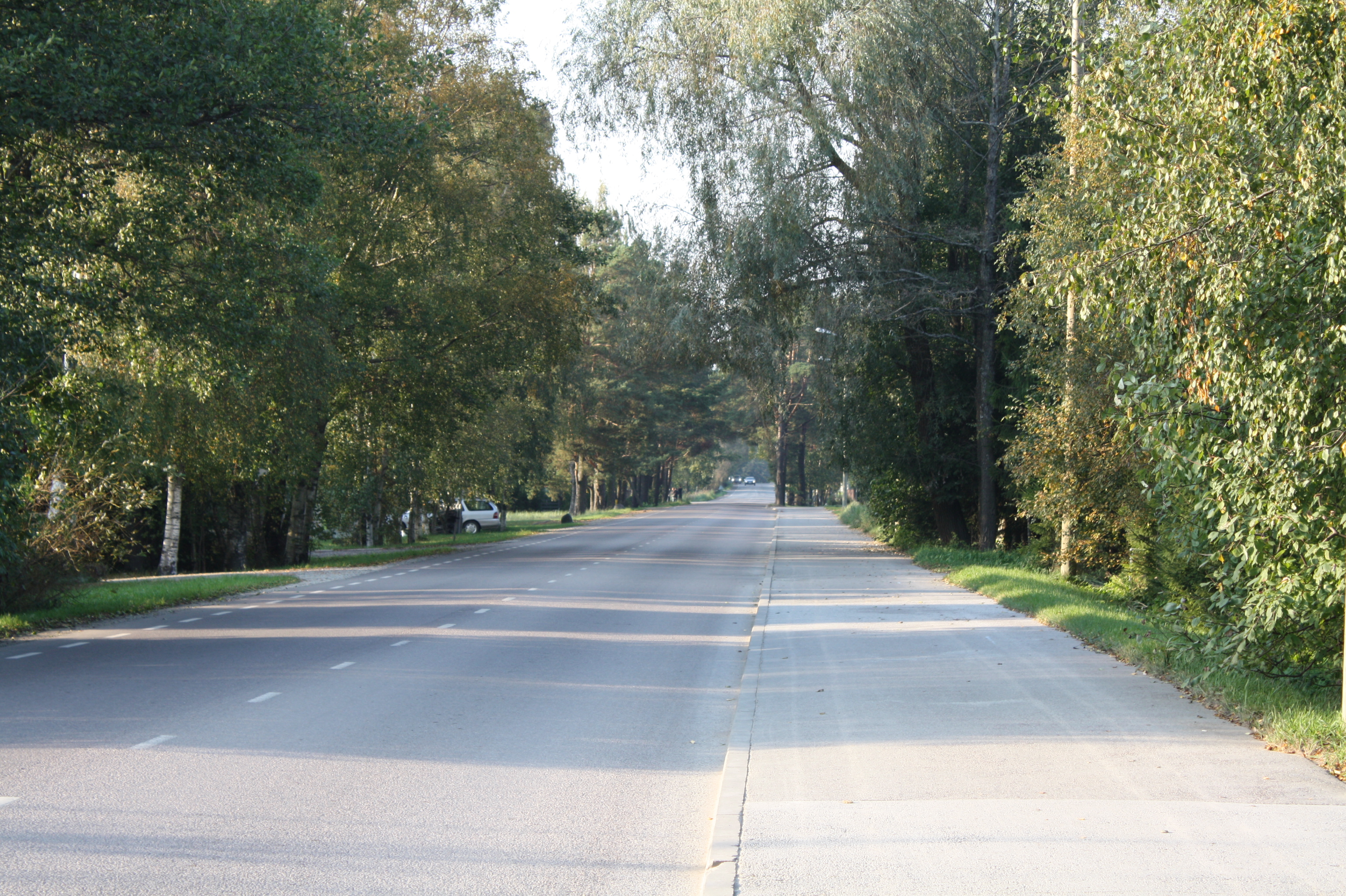
