= Pikaliiva =

Subdistrict of Tallinn, Estonia

Coordinates: 59.429953°N 24.613366°E

- Subdistrict of Tallinn
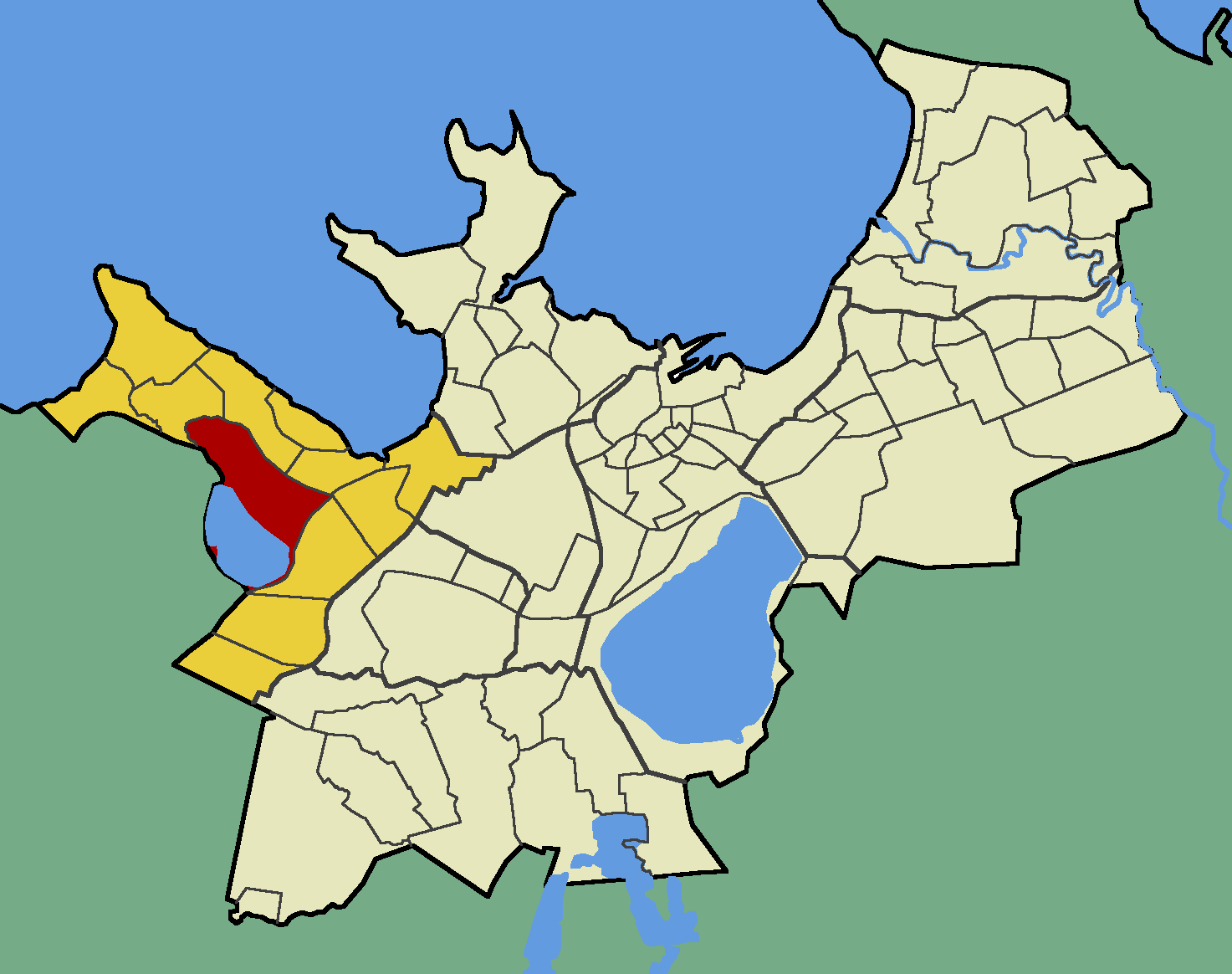
- Pikaliiva within Haabersti District.
- Country: Estonia
- County: Harju County
- City: Tallinn
- District: Haabersti

Population (01.01.2014)
  - Total: 2,464

Pikaliiva (Estonian for "Long Sand") is a subdistrict of the district of Haabersti in Tallinn, the capital of Estonia. As of 1 January 2014, it has a population of 2,464.

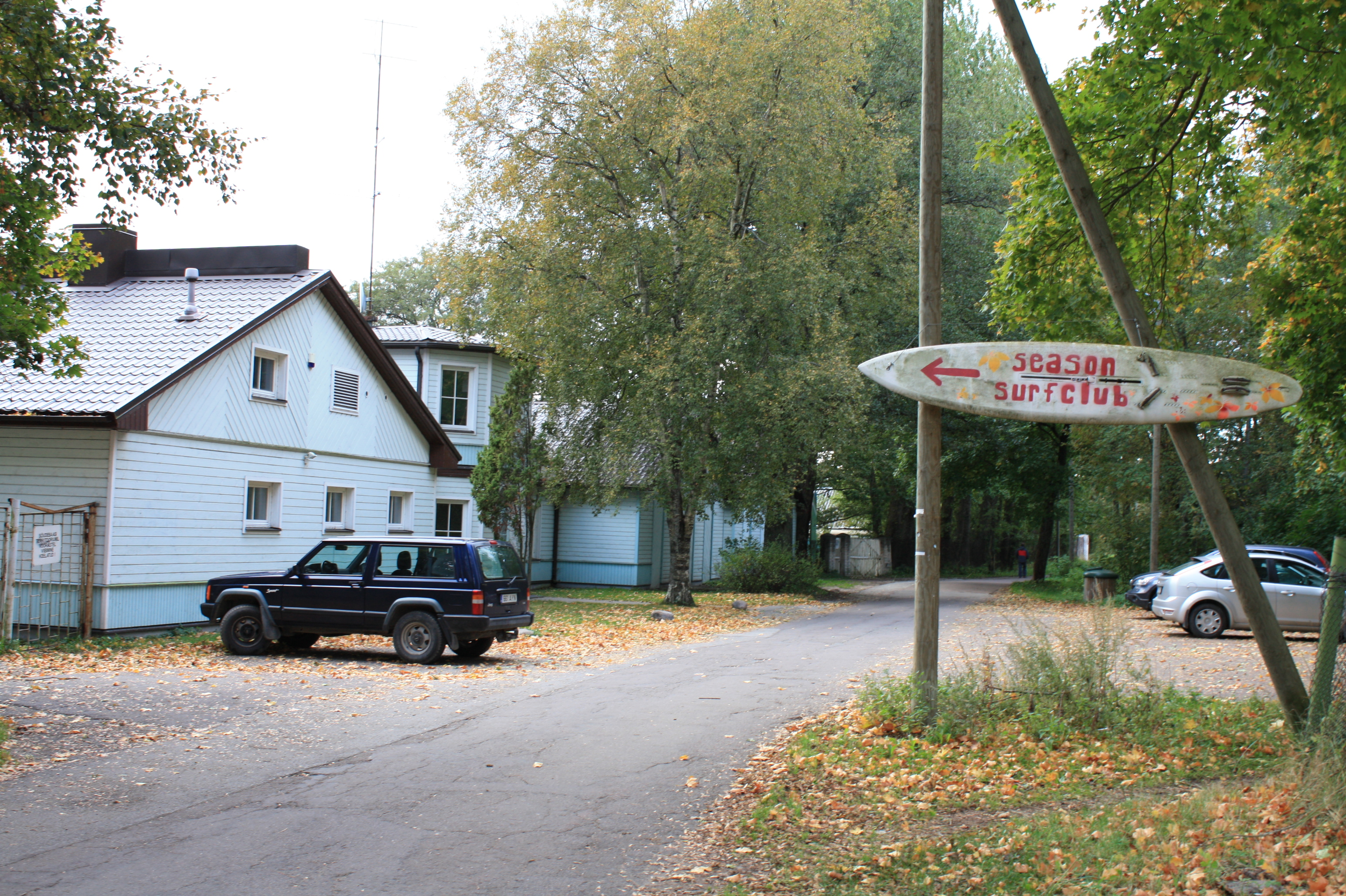
Street in Pikaliiva

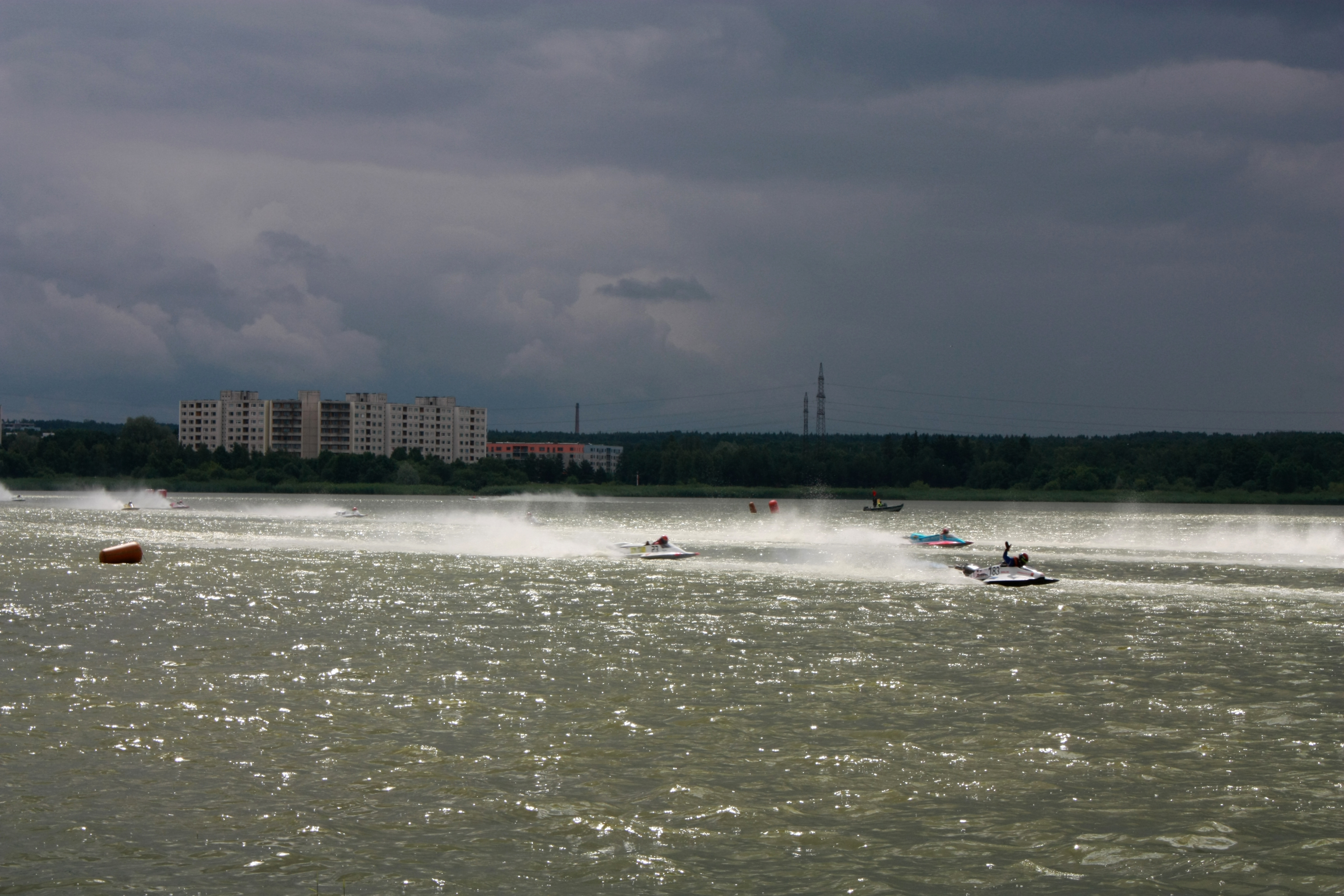
Lake Harku
