= Mustjõe, Tallinn =

Subdistrict of Tallinn, Estonia

Coordinates: 59°25′42.7″N 24°40′40.36″E

Mustjõe
- Subdistrict of Tallinn
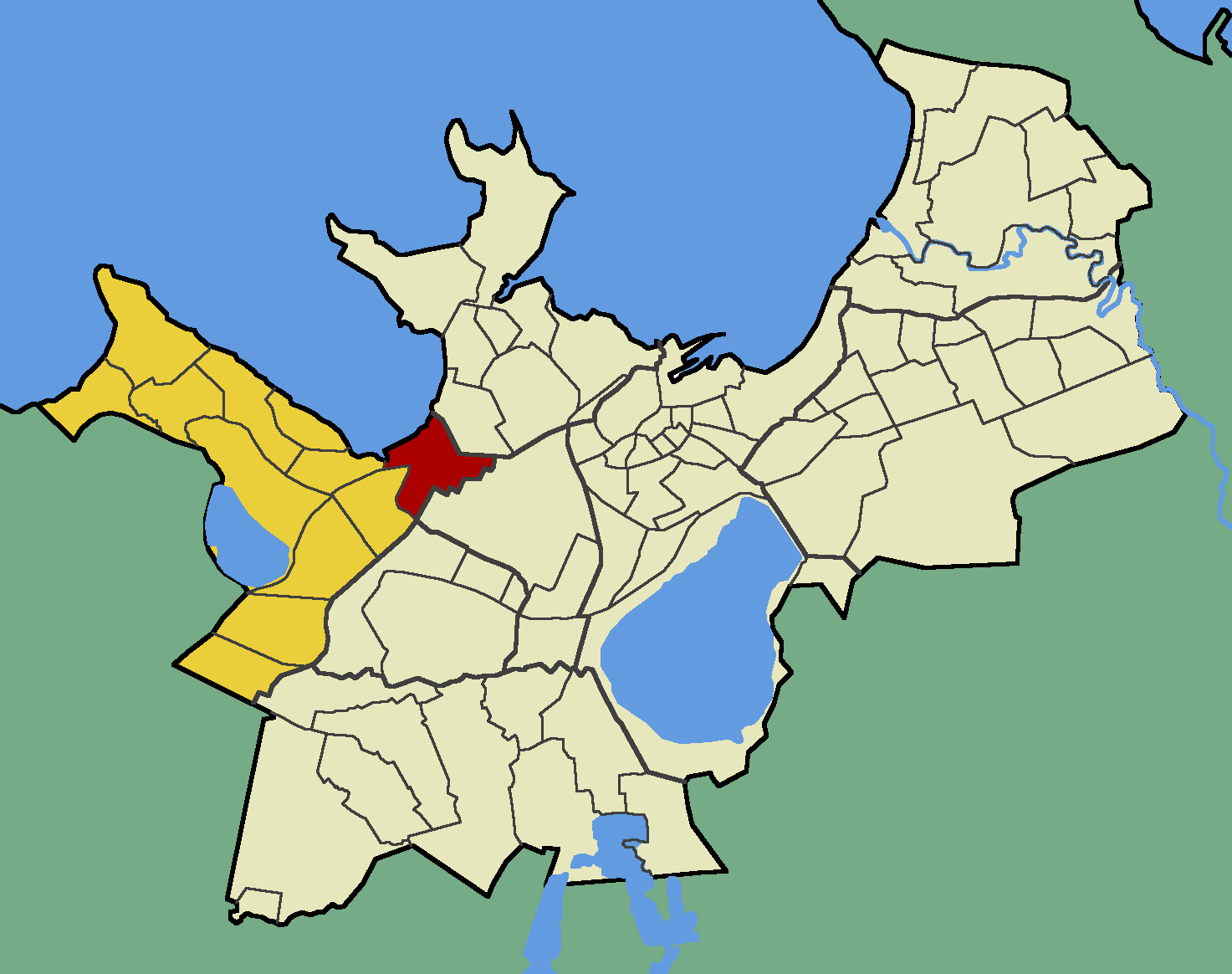
- Mustjõe within Haabersti District.
- Country: Estonia
- County: Harjumaa
- City: Tallinn
- District: Haabersti

Population (01.01.2014)
  - Total: 3,181

Mustjõe (Estonian for "Black River") is a subdistrict (Estonian: asum) in the district of Haabersti, Tallinn, the capital of Estonia. It has a population of 3,181 (as of 1 January 2014).

== Gallery ==
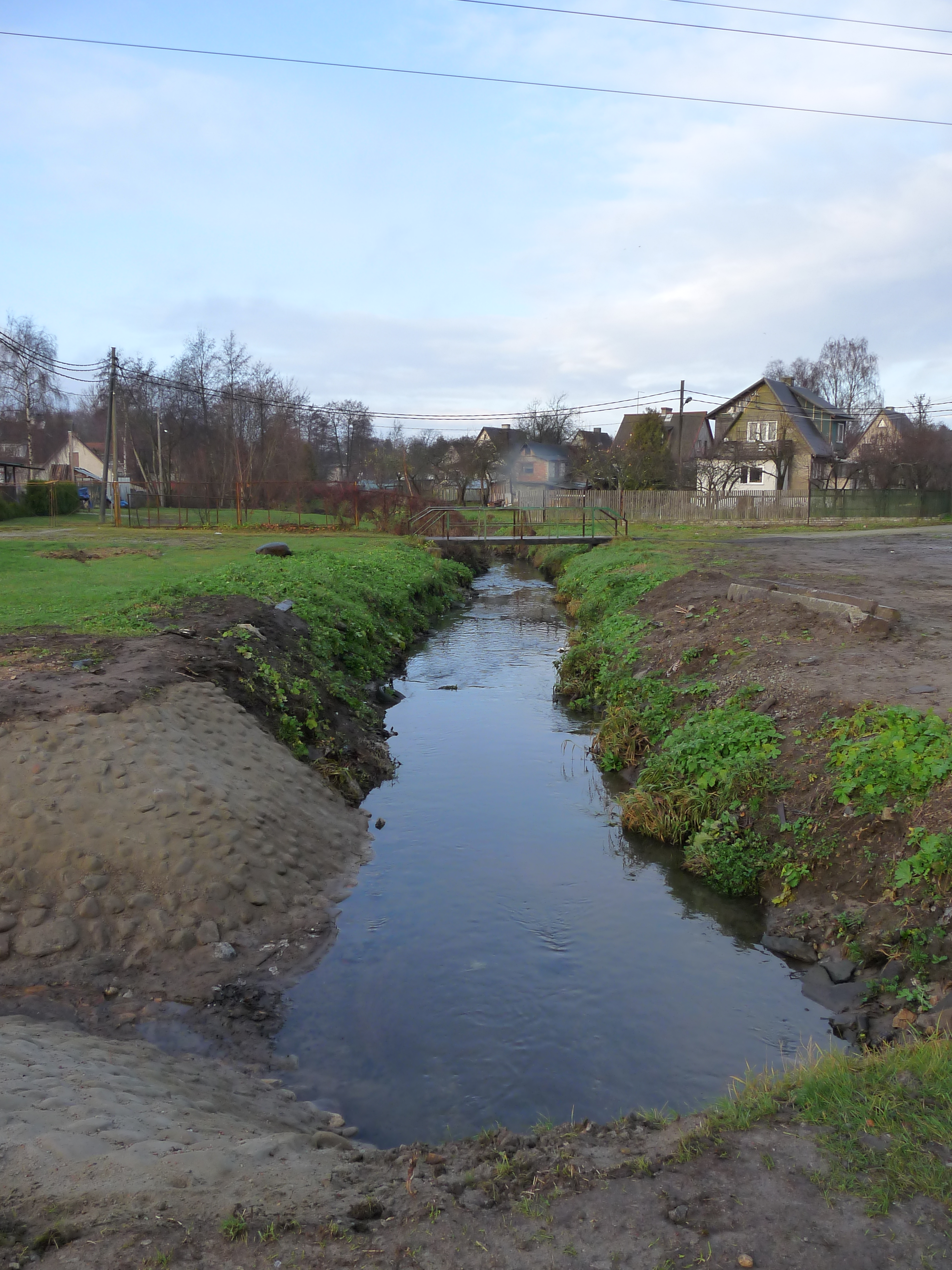

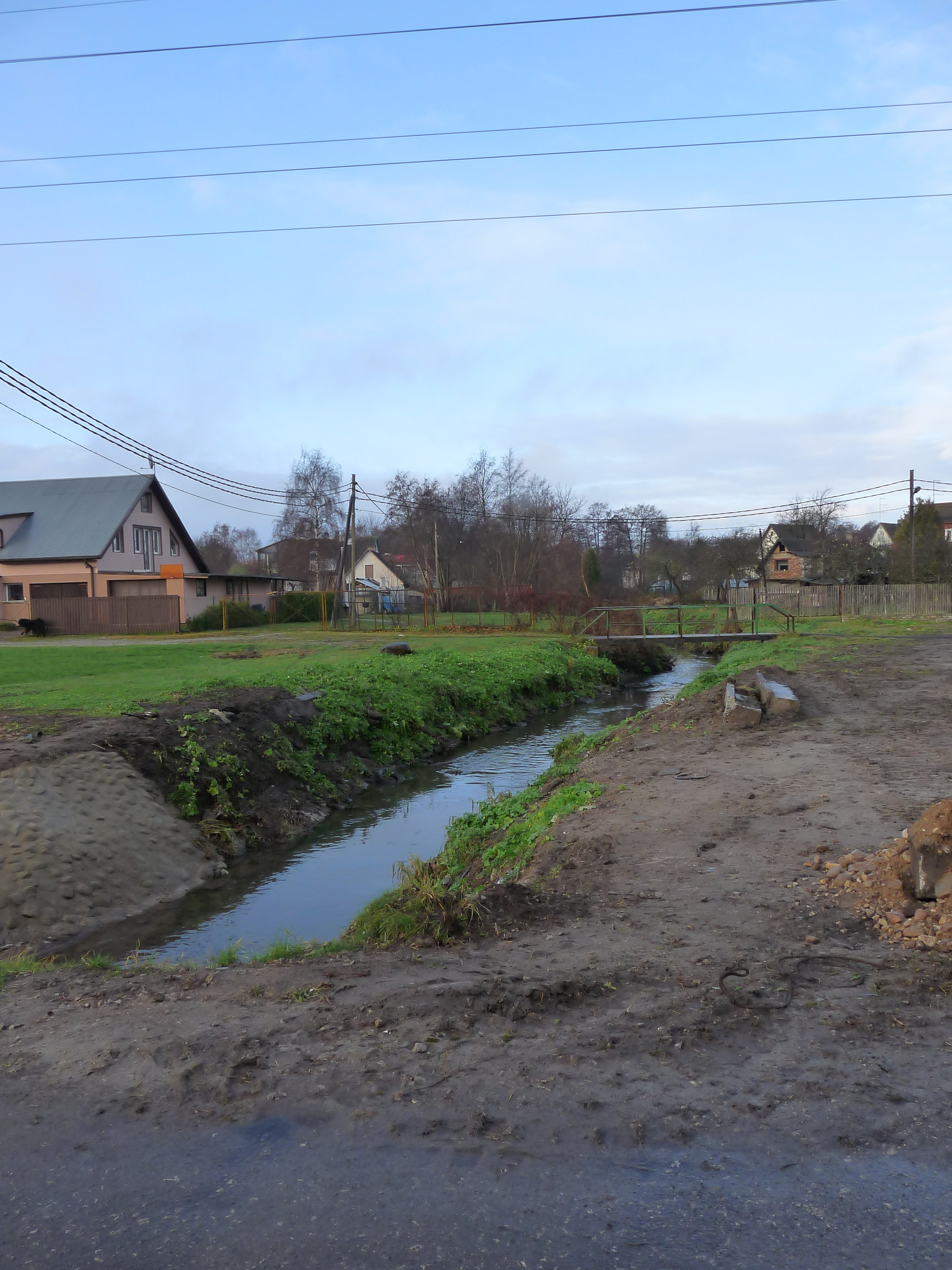

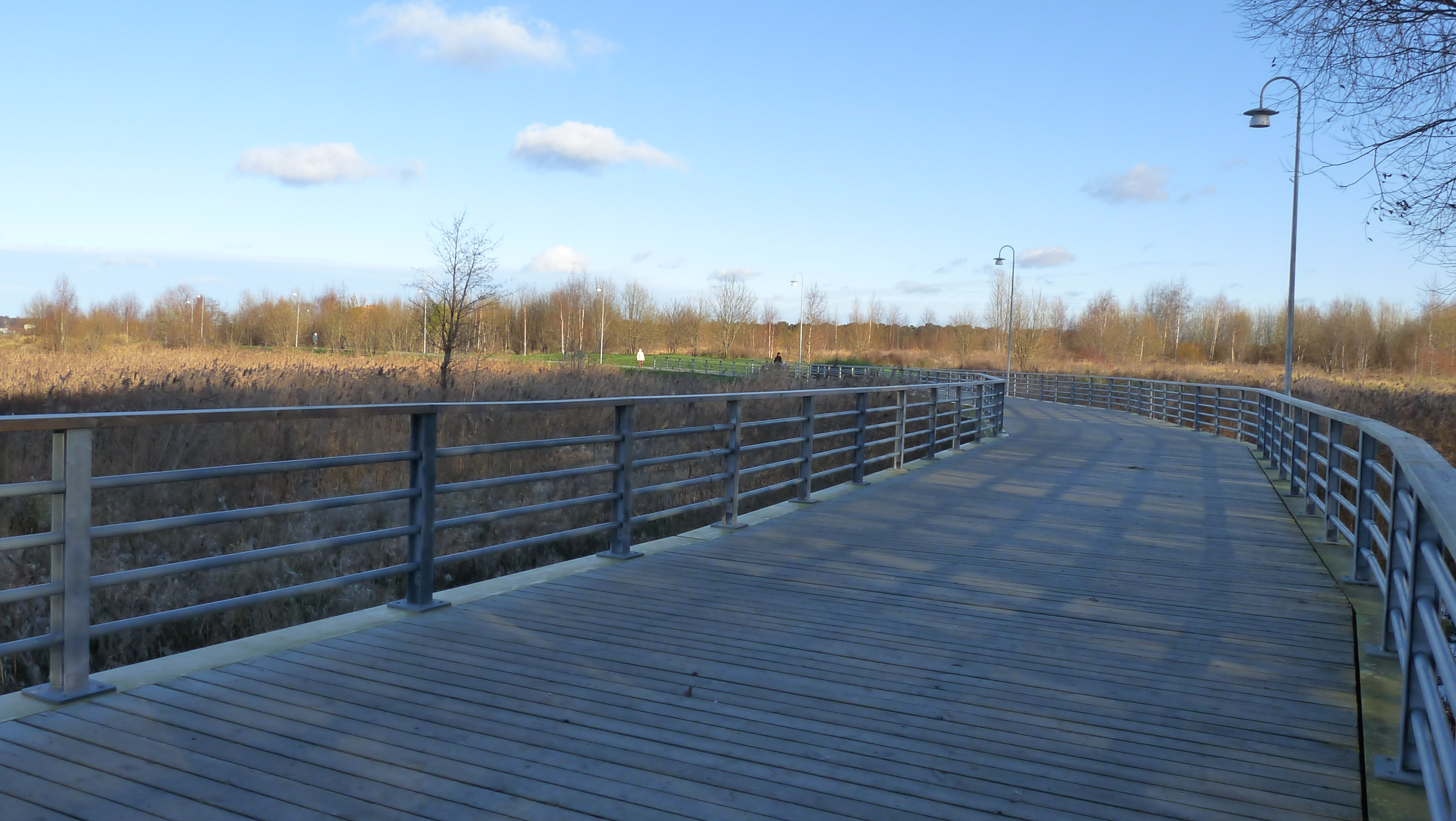

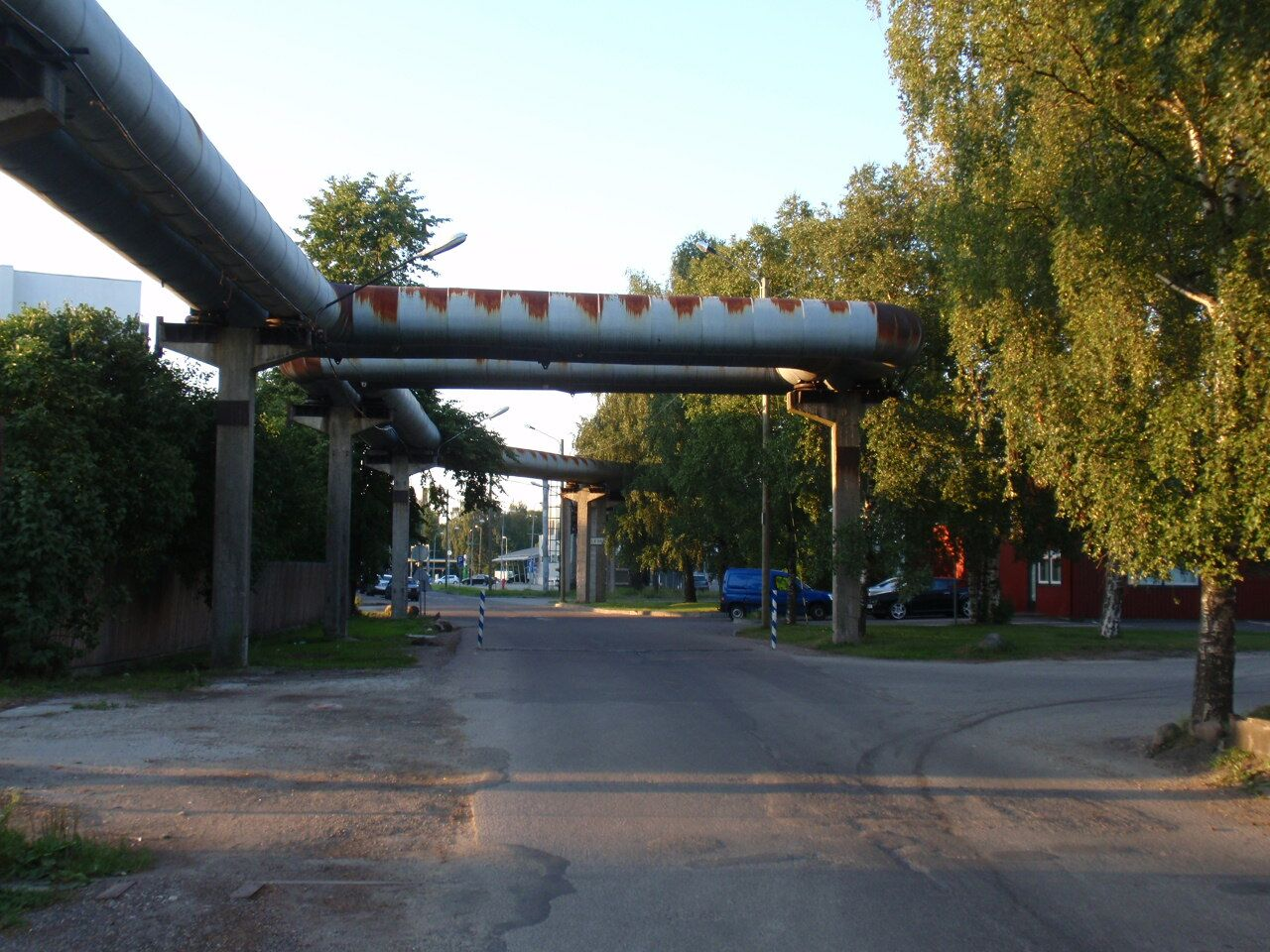
