= Lake Harku =

Lake in Estonia

- Harku järv (Estonian)
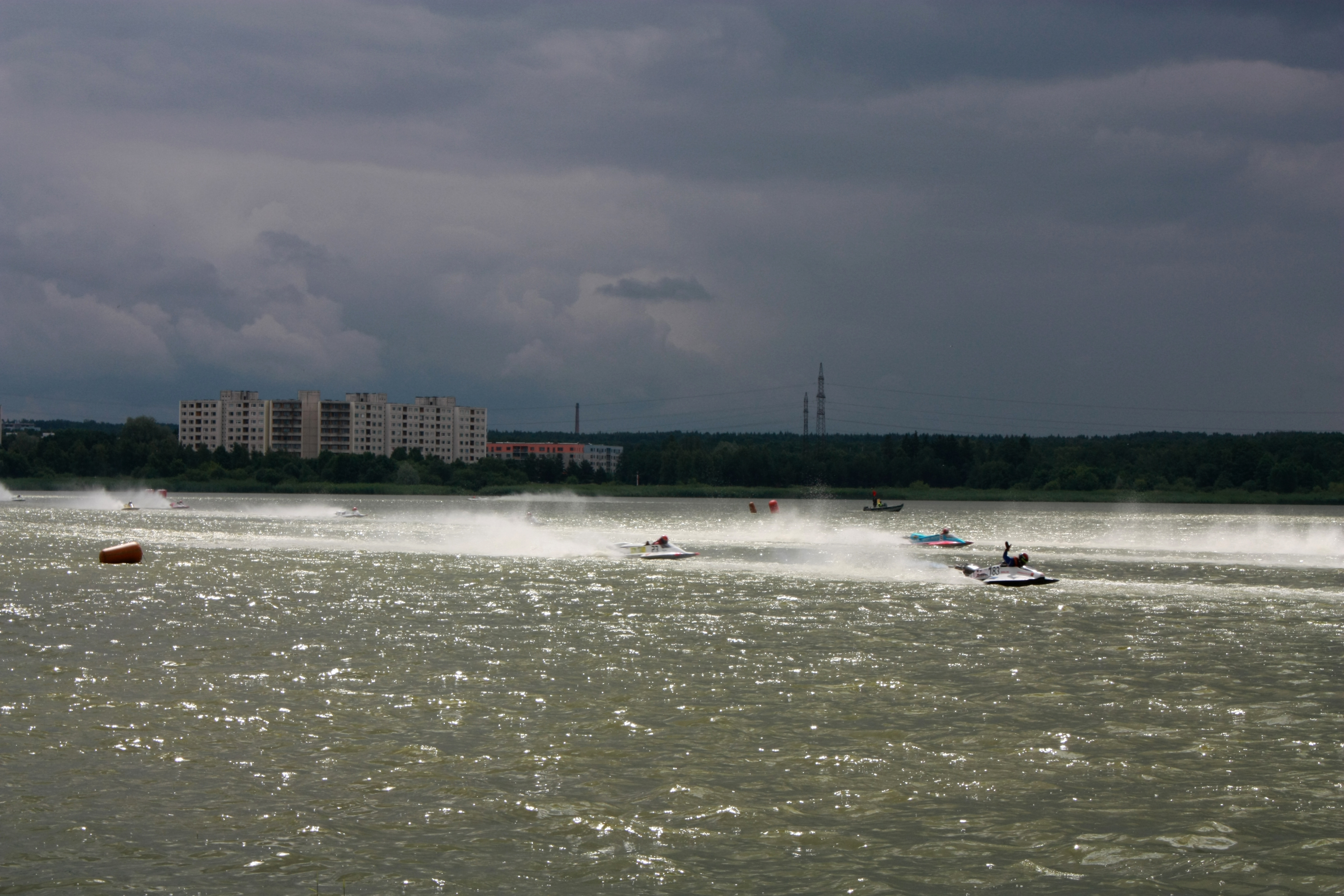
- Water Moto World Championship on Lake Harku

- Location within Estonia
- Location: Pikaliiva, Haabersti, Tallinn
- Coordinates: 59°25′N 24°37′E
- Type: Eutrophic
- Primary inflows: Harku stream
- Primary outflows: Tiskre stream (to Kakumäe Bay, part of Gulf of Finland)
- Catchment area: 47.17 km^{2} (18.21 sq mi; 11,660 acres)
- Basin countries: Estonia
- Max. length: 2,000 m (6,600 ft)
- Max. width: 1,160 m (3,810 ft)
- Surface area: 162.9 ha (403 acres)
- Average depth: 1.6 m (5.2 ft)
- Max. depth: 2.5 m (8.2 ft)
- Water volume: 453,600 m^{3} (367.7 acre⋅ft)
- Shore length^{1}: 6.772 km (4.2 mi)
- Settlements: Tallinn
- ^{1} Shore length is not a well-defined measure.

Lake Harku (Estonian: Harku järv; also known as Haabersti järv, Loodjärv, Argo järv) is a 162.9 ha (403-acre) lake on the western border of Tallinn, Estonia. It has an average depth of 1.6 m (5.2 ft) and a maximum depth of 2.5 m (8.2 ft).

The lake's beach is the only lakeside beach in Tallinn. On the beach, there are changing cabins, a shower, playgrounds, and areas for ball games.

== Gallery ==
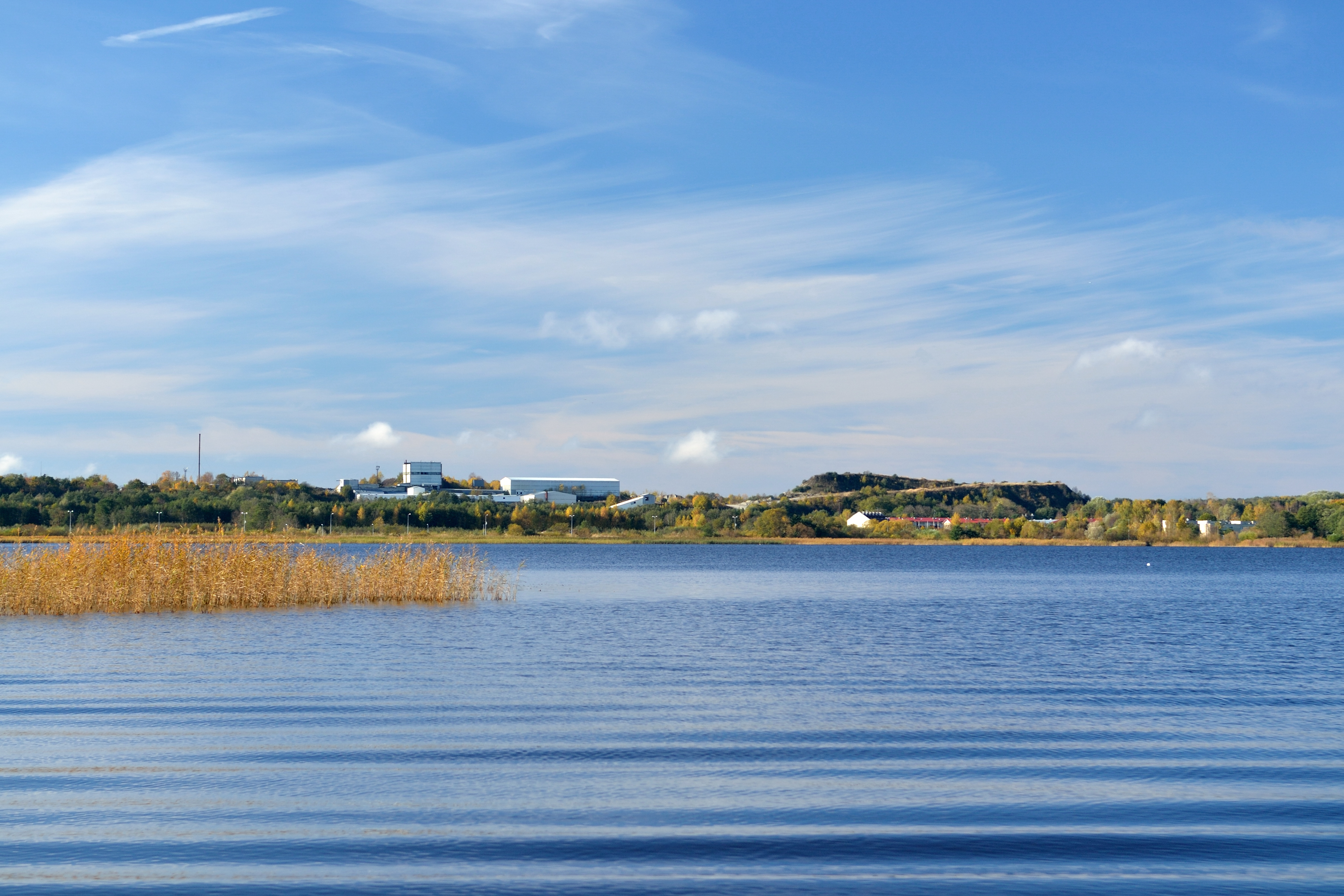

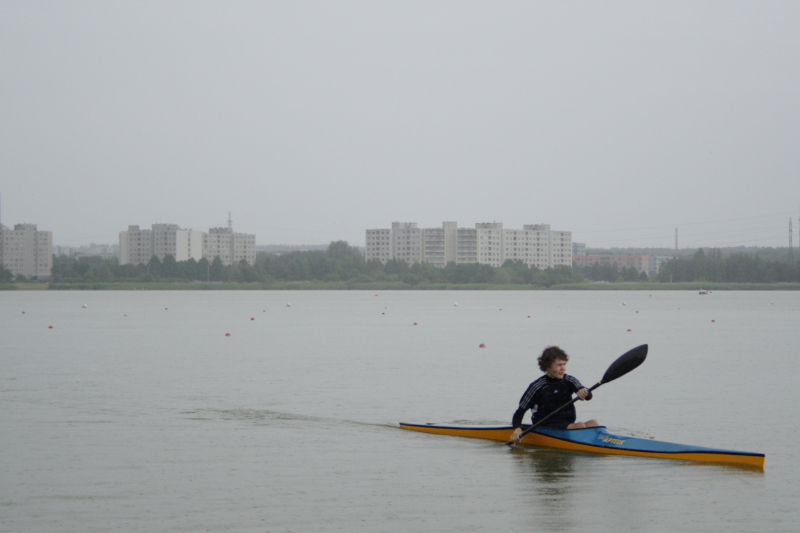

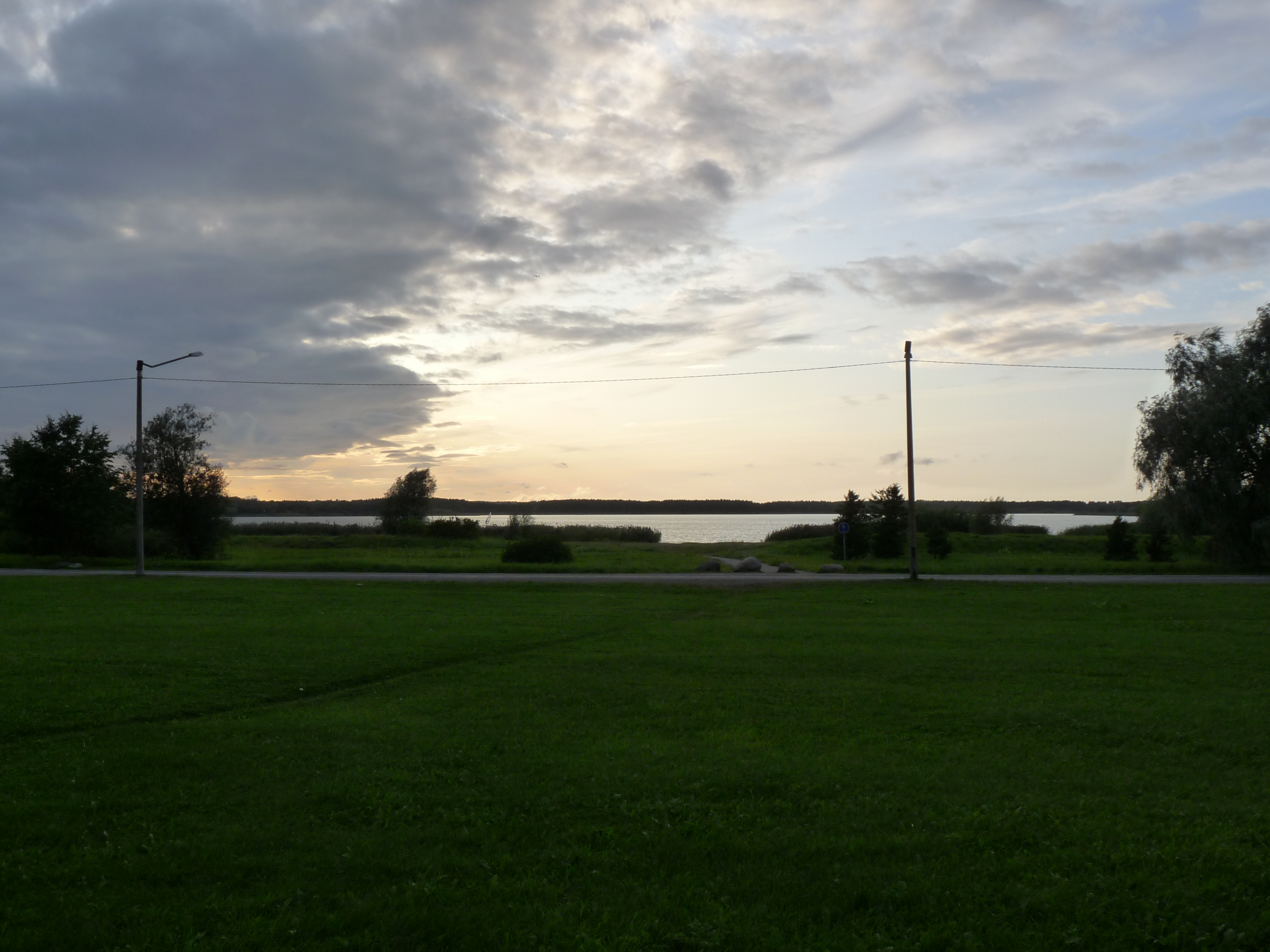

== See also ==
- List of lakes in Estonia
- Lake Ülemiste, another lake in Tallinn
