= Õismäe =

Subdistrict of Tallinn, Estonia

Coordinates: 59°25′51.05″N 24°37′45.36″E

- Subdistrict of Tallinn
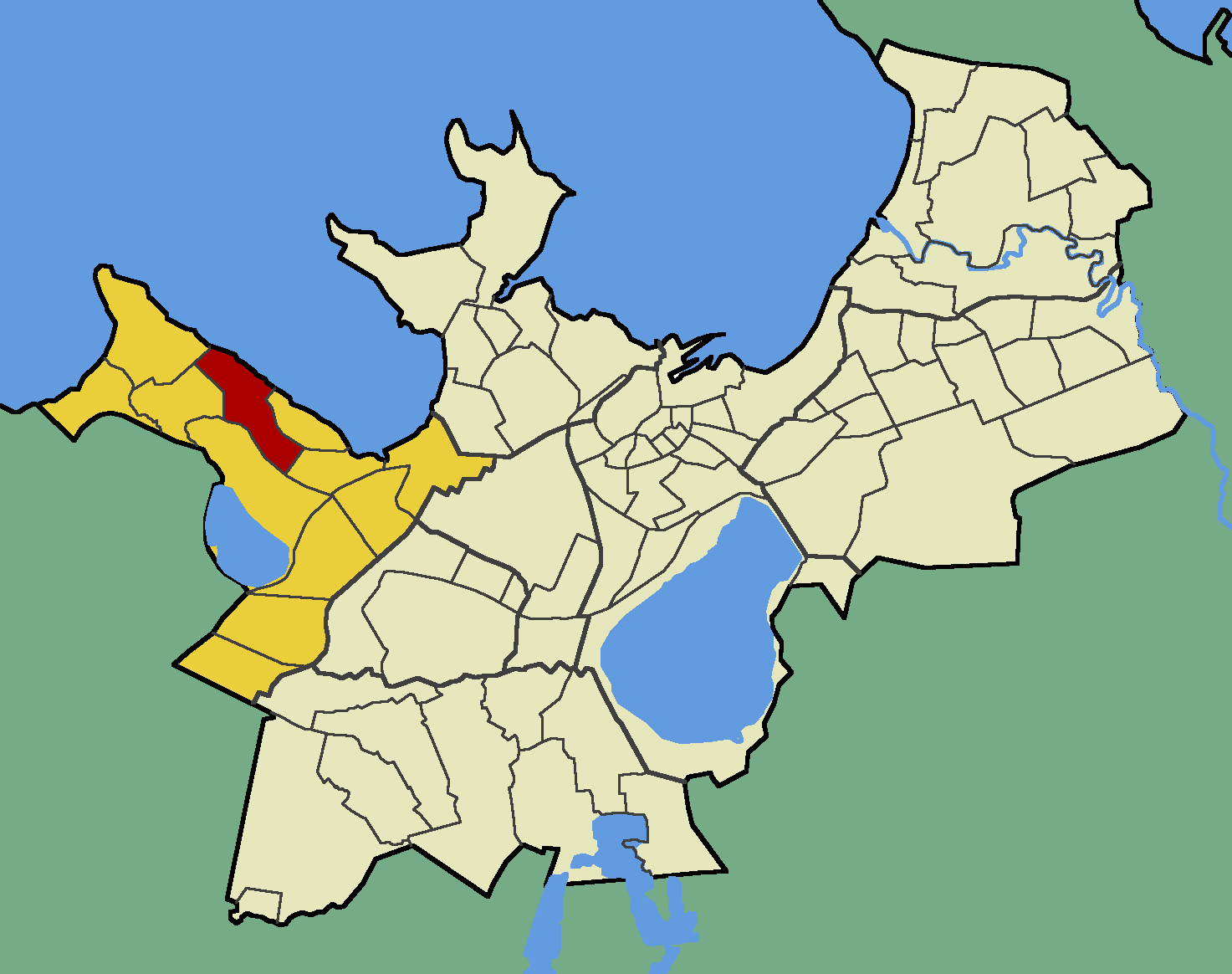
- Õismäe within Haabersti District.
- Country: Estonia
- County: Harju County
- City: Tallinn
- District: Haabersti

Population (1 January 2014)
  - Total: 1,117

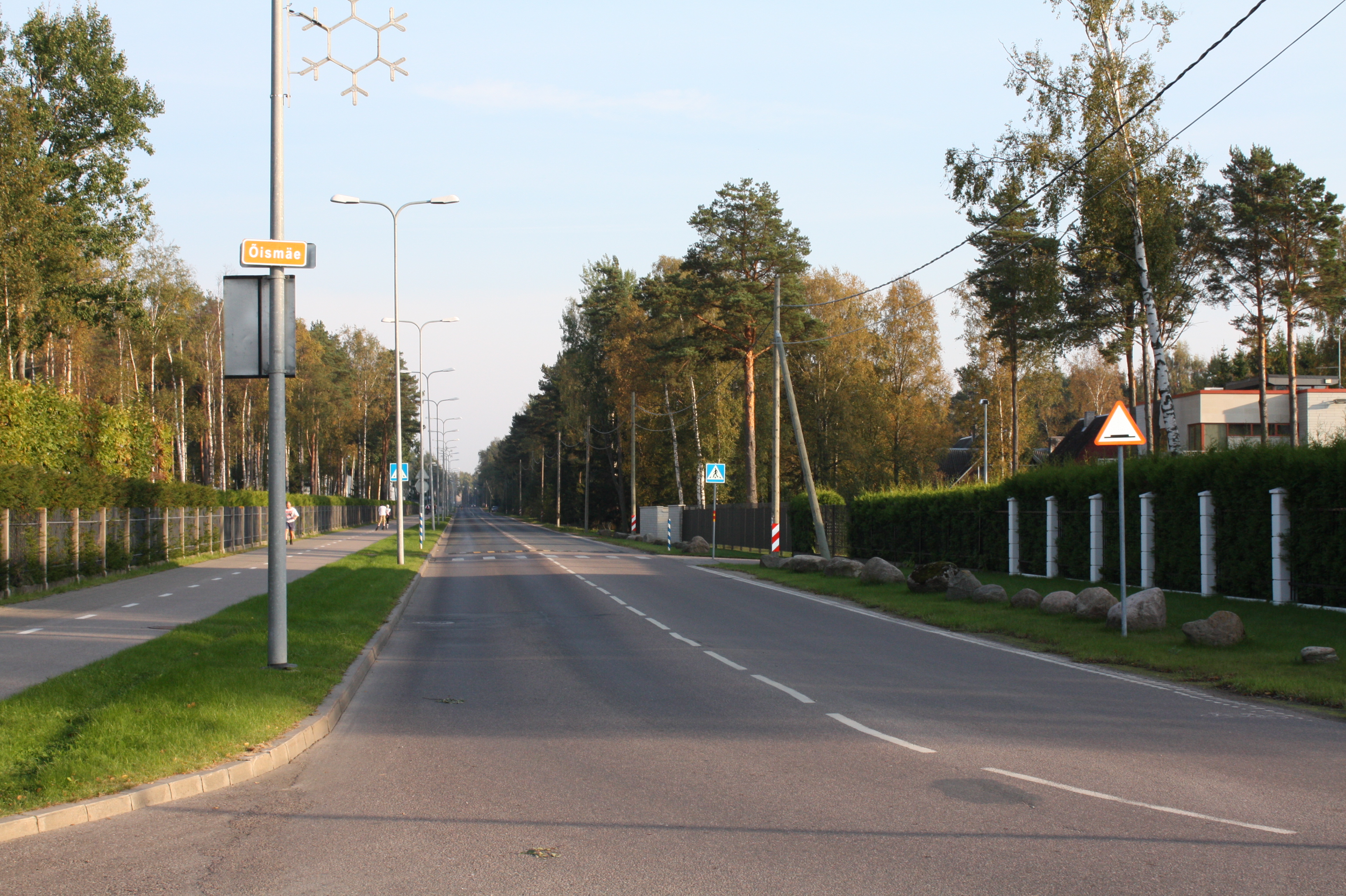
A street in Õismäe

Õismäe (Estonian for "Blossom Hill") is a subdistrict (Estonian: asum) in the district of Haabersti, Tallinn. As of 1 January 2014, it has a population of 1,117.

Õismäe encompasses also Õismäe Bog.

First mentionings of the area, come from 1646 (Heuschlag Heise Nehm); 1808 the farmhouse (Eisneme) and 1873 the manor (Hofstelle Öismäe).
