= Tallinn Zoo =

Zoo in Tallinn, Estonia

Tallinn Zoo Tallinna Loomaaed
- Tallinn Zoo logo

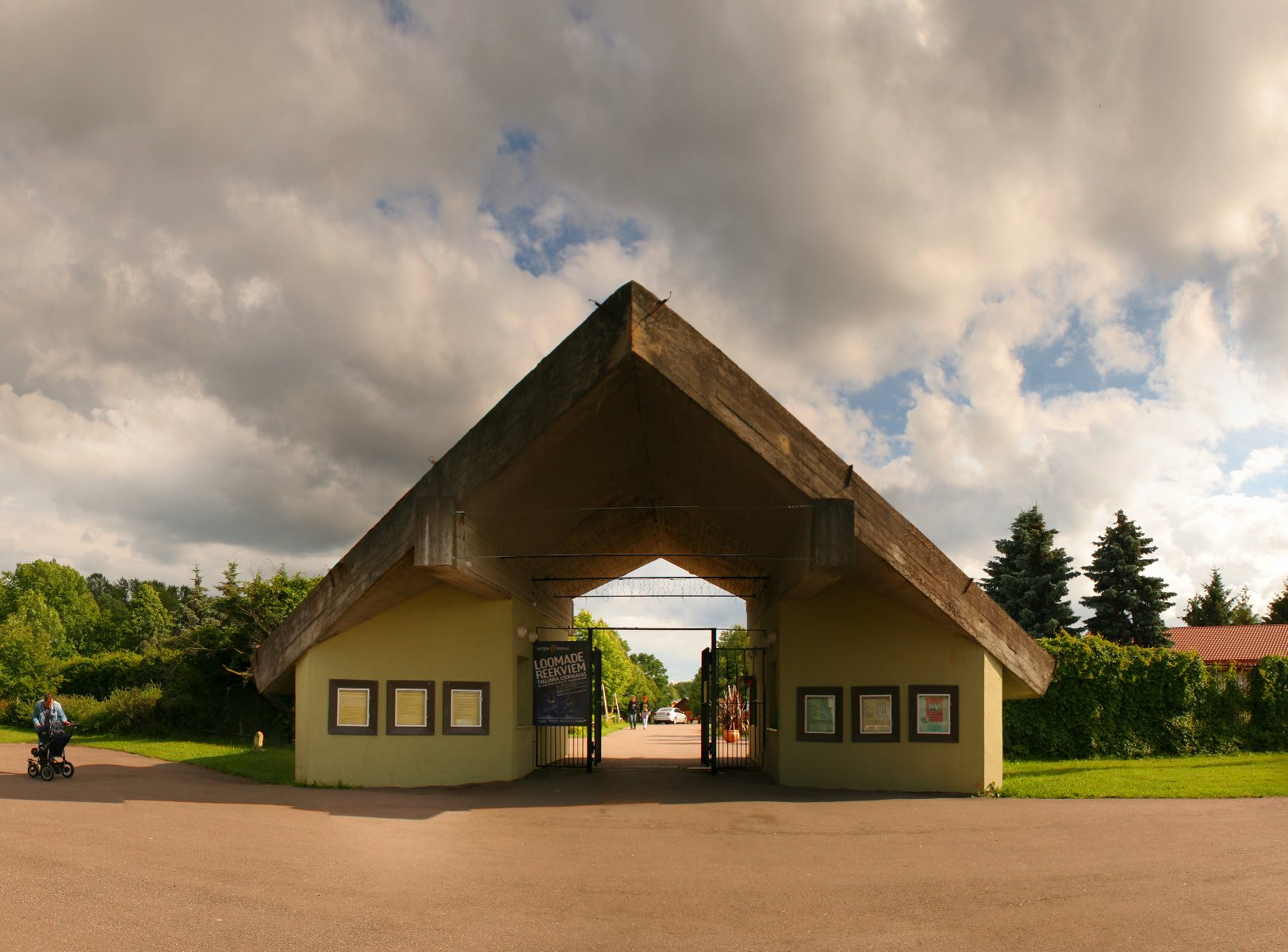
- Zoo entrance
- Interactive map of Tallinn Zoo; Tallinna Loomaaed
- 59°25′14.59″N 24°39′28.95″E
- Date opened: 25 August 1939
- Location: Tallinn, Estonia
- Land area: 89 hectares (220 acres)
- No. of animals: 13,336 (2012)
- No. of species: 548 (2012)
- Annual visitors: 333,696 (2012)
- Memberships: WAZA, EAZA, VDZ, EARAZA
- Website: www.loomaaed.ee/index.php?nlan=eng&index=on&ndbase=1; www.interactivezoo.eu

Tallinn Zoo (Estonian: Tallinna Loomaaed) is a zoo in Tallinn, Estonia, that was founded in 1939. It is the only zoo in Estonia, and as of 2012, it housed 13,336 animals representing 548 species. Since 2009, it is the most visited zoo in the Baltic states.

== History ==
In 1937, a team of Estonian marksmen won the World Champion title in Helsinki. They brought back with them a young lynx, named Illu. Illu became the first exhibit in the zoo, which was formally opened on 25 August 1939. The lynx was later chosen to be the zoo's emblem animal.

Initially, the zoo was based on the edge of Kadriorg Park. Estonia was occupied and annexed by the Soviet Union in 1940, delaying the planned development of the zoo. It relocated to a 89-hectare (220-acre) site in the Veskimetsa district in 1983.

== Animals and exhibits ==
Group	Species	Animals
Mammals	90	1,296
Birds	123	618
Reptiles	43	156
Amphibians	17	141
Fish	131	2,373
Invertebrates	144	8,752
Total (2012)	548	13,336

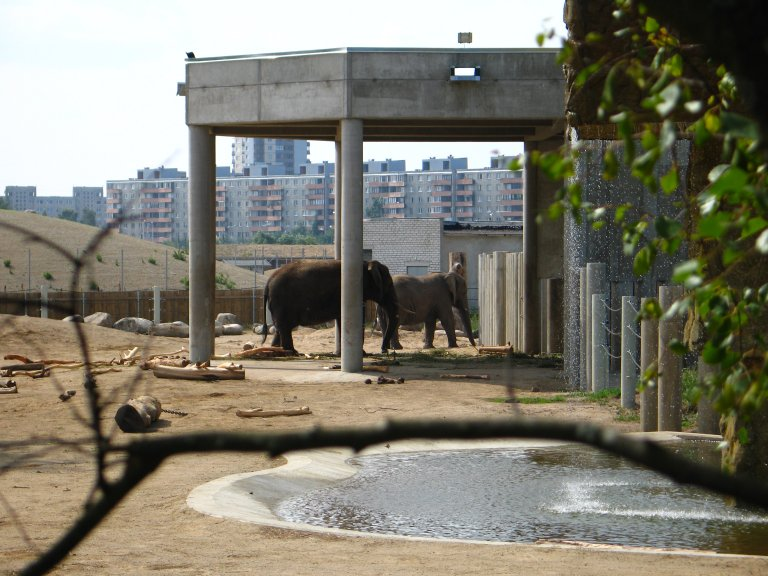
Tallinn Zoo elephant enclosure.

Tallinn Zoo has the world's largest mountain goat and sheep collection, and a large eagle and owl collection.

The zoo has two tropic houses which include crocodiles and other reptiles, as well as fishes, exotic birds, marmosets, chimpanzees, and mongooses.

The Elephant House was built in 1989 to celebrate the zoo's 50th birthday. It houses snakes, African elephants, two black rhinos, pygmy hippos, armadillos, and rodents.

The Alpinarium has been part of the zoo since 2004. In the Alpinarium, one can find mountain sheep, ibex, and snow leopards.

The Middle-Asia Complex was built in 2002, and includes animals such as Przewalski's horses, Bactrian camels, bison, yak, and hyaenas. Near the Middle-Asia complex are pheasants, and water bird lakes that are home to ducks, pelicans, swans, and other water birds.

Hawk Mountain is home to eagles, vultures and owls. Here one can find different vultures, golden eagles, Steller's sea eagles, barn owls and many other eagles and owls.

== Conservation and breeding ==
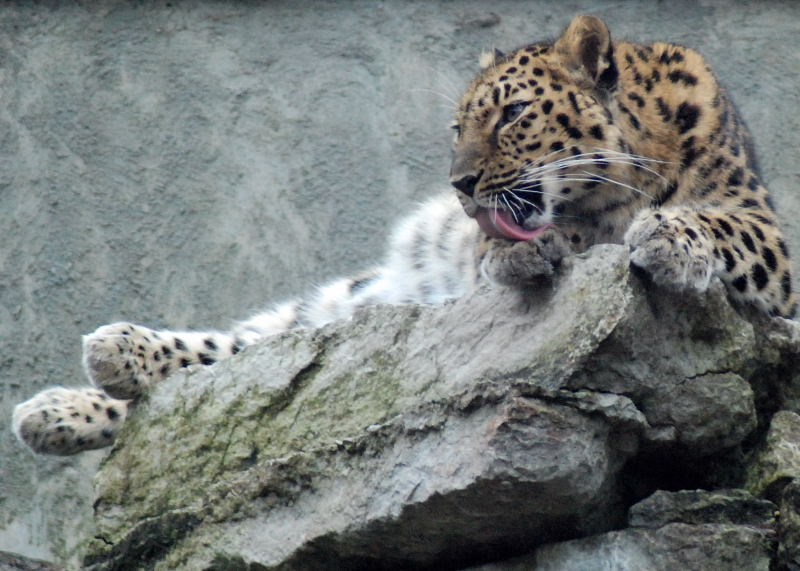
Amur leopard Darla in Tallinn Zoo

Tallinn zoo has successfully bred many animals, including the Amur leopard, long-tailed goral, Steller's sea eagle, black rhinoceros and snow leopards.

Tallinn Zoo is working on a European mink mission to release these endangered animals to wild.

== Incidents ==
In late 2007, a polar bear escaped from its cage due to human negligence, and died after being tranquilized.

In July 2004, a man who had fallen asleep in a drunken stupor, woke up and roamed the zoo alone. He evidently tried to offer a polar bear a cookie, only to have his hand bitten off. His screams alerted security, who called an ambulance. He survived following surgery, but his hand was never recovered.

== The future ==
Tallinn Zoo is building new exhibits for bears, wolves, tigers, and other animals, which live in old military buildings right now. The zoo is currently undergoing a major modernization program, updating the facilities.
