= List of magazines in Estonia =

Below is a list of existing and former magazines in Estonia. This list is incomplete.

Magazine	Type	Published	Distribution	Existing year(s)	Language	Publisher	Notes	Website
Acta Historica Tallinnensia				1997–	Estonian, English	Estonian Academy Publishers	peer-reviewed academic journal	
Agraarteadus					Estonian			
Ajalooline Ajakiri				1922–	Estonian	University of Tartu Press	peer-reviewed academic journal	
Aja Pulss	National		Estonia	1985-1993	Estonian			
Diplomaatia					Estonian			
Eesti Arst					Estonian			
Eesti Elu				2002-	Estonian	Tartu College's Publishing Committee	in exile	
Eesti Hõim				1928-1933			Finno-Ugric topics	
Eesti Mets				1921–1940; 1989–	Estonian			
Eesti Naine					English			
Ehitus ja Arhitektuur				1962–1990	Estonian			
Ehituskunst				1981–			serial publication. Dedicated to architecture	
Estonian Art								
Estonian World				2012	English		web magazine	
Favoriit					Estonian			
Forschungen zur baltischen Geschichte							in English: The Studies on Baltic History	
Helikund				1922	Estonian			
Kodumurre				1960-2002	Estonian		serial publication. Dedicated to Estonian dialects	
Kroonika	National		Estonia	1996-	Estonian			https://kroonika.delfi.ee/
Linda	Women's magazine		Estonia	1887-1905	Estonian			
Luup								
Mäetagused				1996	Estonian		peer-reviewed academic journal	https://www.folklore.ee/tagused/
Mana				1957–1999	Estonian			
Naisteleht	National		Estonia	2006-	Estonian			https://naisteleht.ohtuleht.ee/
Naistemaailm				2011-2012	Estonian	Ajakirjade Kirjastus		
Naiste Töö ja Elu								
Raamatukogu					Estonian			
Rahvuslik Kontakt								
Säde				1924				
Sädemed	Humor magazine		Estonia	1905–1934	Estonian			
Siluett				1958–1992	Estonian	Tallinna Moemaja	focused on fashion	
Sporditäht				1992–2009	Estonian		focused on sport in Estonia	
Tuna				1998–	Estonian	Society of Estonian Archivists		
Teater. Muusika. Kino.				1982–	Estonian	Kultuurileht Foundation		
Tuuslar	Humor magazine		Estonia	1922–1922	Estonian			
Tuuslar			Estonia	1928–1928	Estonian			
Värske Rõhk				2005–	Estonian		literary magazine	
Wirmalised	Humor magazine		Estonia	1907–1907	Estonian			

== See also ==
- List of newspapers in Estonia
