= Vello Agori =

Estonian caricaturist (1894–1944)

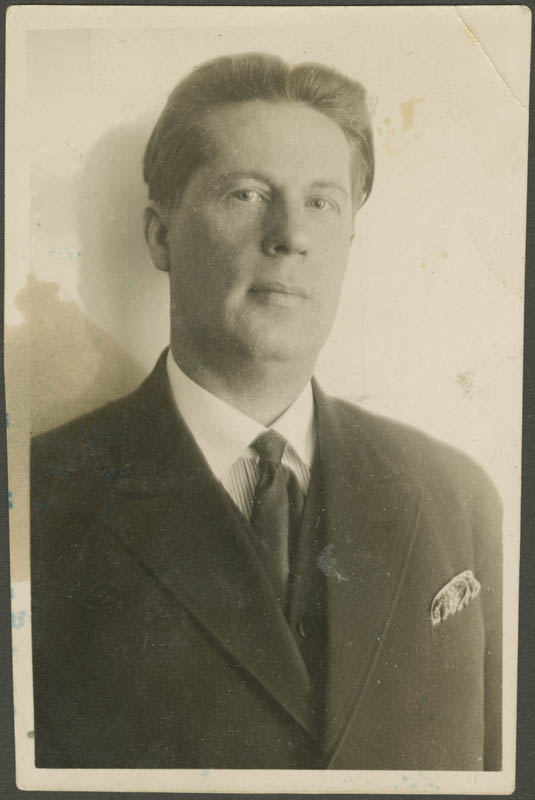
- Born: Grigori Tõnisson; February 20, 1894; Pärnu, Estonia
- Died: October 7, 1944 (aged 50); Tallinn, Estonia
- Resting place: Alexander Nevsky Cemetery, Tallinn
- Occupation: Caricaturist

Vello Agori (until 1935 Grigori Tõnisson, also known as Georg Tõnisson, pen name Gori; February 20, 1894 – October 7, 1944) was an Estonian caricaturist.

== Early life and education ==
Vello Agori's father Jüri (1844–?) was a janitor at Pärnu boys' high school, and his mother Anna (née Blumenfeldt, 1860–1955) was a laundress. He came from an Orthodox family and was baptized Grigori, but among the children he was called Gori, which was the origin of his future pseudonym as a cartoonist. He attended Pärnu High School for two years, and then Pärnu city school. While still in school, he studied under the artist Rudolf Lepik (1881–1918).

== Career ==
Initially, Gori submitted his caricatures widely, but they were not published. To support himself, he mainly worked as a bricklayer. In 1911, Gori's first twenty works were published in the magazines Sädemed and Meie Mats. In 1913, he settled in Tallinn and started working for the newspaper Leek.

During the First World War, in January 1915, Gori was mobilized into the Russian Tsarist Army and sent to Poland. In 1915, in his first battle near Danzig, he was captured by the Germans and was a German prisoner of war from 1915 to 1918. However, rumors spread in Estonia that Gori had died in the war. At the end of 1918, Päevaleht even published an obituary in which it deeply regretted the death of a brilliant talent. However, at the beginning of 1919, Gori appeared alive and well in the editorial office of Meie Mats and started working with enthusiasm. In August 1919, together with Hendrik Saar, Gori founded the newspaper Sipelgas. However, it ceased publication after a year because the bookseller and publisher Jakob Ploompuu first purchased Sipelgas and then acquired its editors and owners. At the same time, Gori also contributed to the paper Meie Mats and the magazine Odamees. From 1920 to 1938, he worked in the editorial office of Vaba Maa and published illustrations under the pseudonym Gori. Although Jakob Ploompuu had allowed Gori to contribute to other publications, Aleksander Veiler, the head of the Vaba Maa publishing company, did not allow this, but instead provided him with a low-cost apartment and paid him extra. Together with royalties, the cartoonist earned 50,000 marks a month with Veiler, which was equivalent to a minister's salary in the 1920s. He was the best-earning artist in Estonia.

In 1928, Gori published the cartoon book Knock-out, which quickly sold out. Knock-out is characterized as follows: "Your mouth is full of roaring laughter, healthy laughter, when you turn the page for the first time, but on the fifth or sixth page you are serious and delve into it as a well-known novel about social life." One of the best-known drawings in Knock-out, "Demokraatia kaks palet" (The Two Faces of Democracy), has been highlighted by both Ilmar Reiman and Romulus Tiitus. The drawing shows a poor woman with two children looking at wealthy people drinking wine, and she says "Darling, I don't have much money to buy acetic acid" (Kuld mul pole niigi palju raha, et äädikahapet võiksin osta). Tiitus believes that "the drawings may not always be related to laughter, that the social scope of the drawings may reach deep tragedy." Tiitus says that if Gori had written the caption to say 'I don't have money to buy bread' the reader would have quickly forgotten this caricature because life offered many such contrasts. Instead of the demand for a means of livelihood, which we would normally expect, there is suddenly a desire—for a means of death! From eternal misery, the only consolation—death—has shrunk, and even this cannot be fulfilled because of the appointed means of living."

In 1930 and 1931, Gori participated with Otto Krusten in an international traveling exhibition, in which Gori presented ten caricatures and Krusten presented 40 caricatures. It was thanks to this traveling exhibition that Estonian caricature art rose to a respectable position in Europe.

The Era of Silence that began in Estonia in 1934 ended Gori's free activities. Several of his cartoons were not published due to censorship, and some of them caused trouble in newspapers. In 1941, the Soviet occupation authorities arrested Gori, but they released him on the condition that he would criticize private traders ("speculators") and slackers in his published cartoons, and he was also forced to draw political cartoons against Estonian independence and politicians, which were published in Rahva Hääl and Sirp ja Vasar.

During the German occupation, Gori was imprisoned twice. During his first imprisonment (August 9, 1941 – September 7, 1942), he had to perform forced labor in a peat bog for ten months. In September 1941, Gori was arrested for mocking the German people and the Führer, and he was sentenced to one year in the Central Prison, where his cellmate was his 15-year-old son Olev, who had written an application to join the Komsomol. This is how the Germans forced Gori to draw cartoons against Joseph Stalin and the USSR, which were published in the newspaper Eesti Sõna. On July 9, 1942, Gori was released from the Central Prison. Subsequently, cartoons by Gori appeared in the newspapers Maa Sõna, Eesti Sõna, and elsewhere, often under a completely different name, but the drawing style betrayed the artist. However, his illustrations no longer had their former sharpness. Gori was imprisoned for the second time on July 27, 1943, and released on November 6, 1943. In 1944, he published only a few cartoons. Two weeks later, after the re-occupation of Estonia by the USSR, Gori was summoned to the NKVD headquarters on Pagar Street for interrogation. On October 7, 1944, Gori was found dead in his apartment at Laulupeo Street 15-7. According to the official report, Gori had committed suicide, but the cartoonist Edmund S. Valtman, who had previously met him on September 21, 1944, did not consider Gori's suicide likely. An invitation to an interrogation with the NKVD was reportedly found in Gori's pocket.

Gori was buried on October 13, 1944, at Aleksander Nevski Cemetery in Tallinn, where speeches were made by Jaan Jensen, Adamson-Eric, and Konstantin Osvet at his funeral.

== Work ==
Already at Pärnu High School, Gori had good drawing skills, and once a week he published a humorous magazine in which he caricatured teachers. His first caricatures were published in the newspaper Meie Mats in 1911. Gori's early works were art nouveau and expressionist drawings. They were published in 1911 in the Postimees supplement Sädemed (Tartu) and in the newspaper Eesti Kodu. During the First World War, the artist's characteristic pictorial satire developed, penetrating all aspects of social life. His caricatures were permeated with deep contempt for the uneducated, dull, and greedy nouveau riche. Along with Karl August Hindrey and Otto Krusten, Gori was the most popular caricaturist of his time, managing to create up to 40,000 drawings altogether.

=== Caricature portraits ===
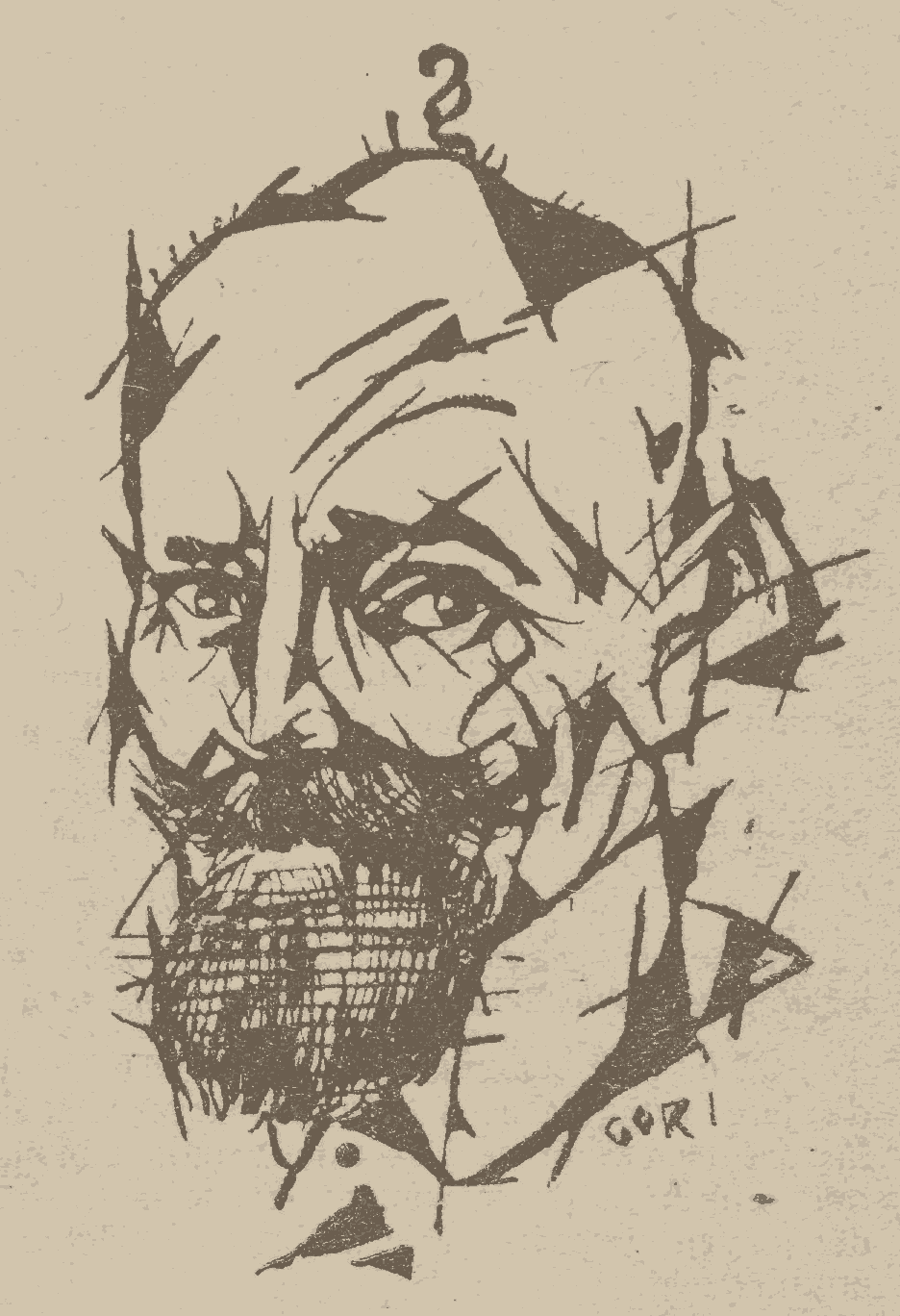
Karl August Hindrey, Nalja album, 1920

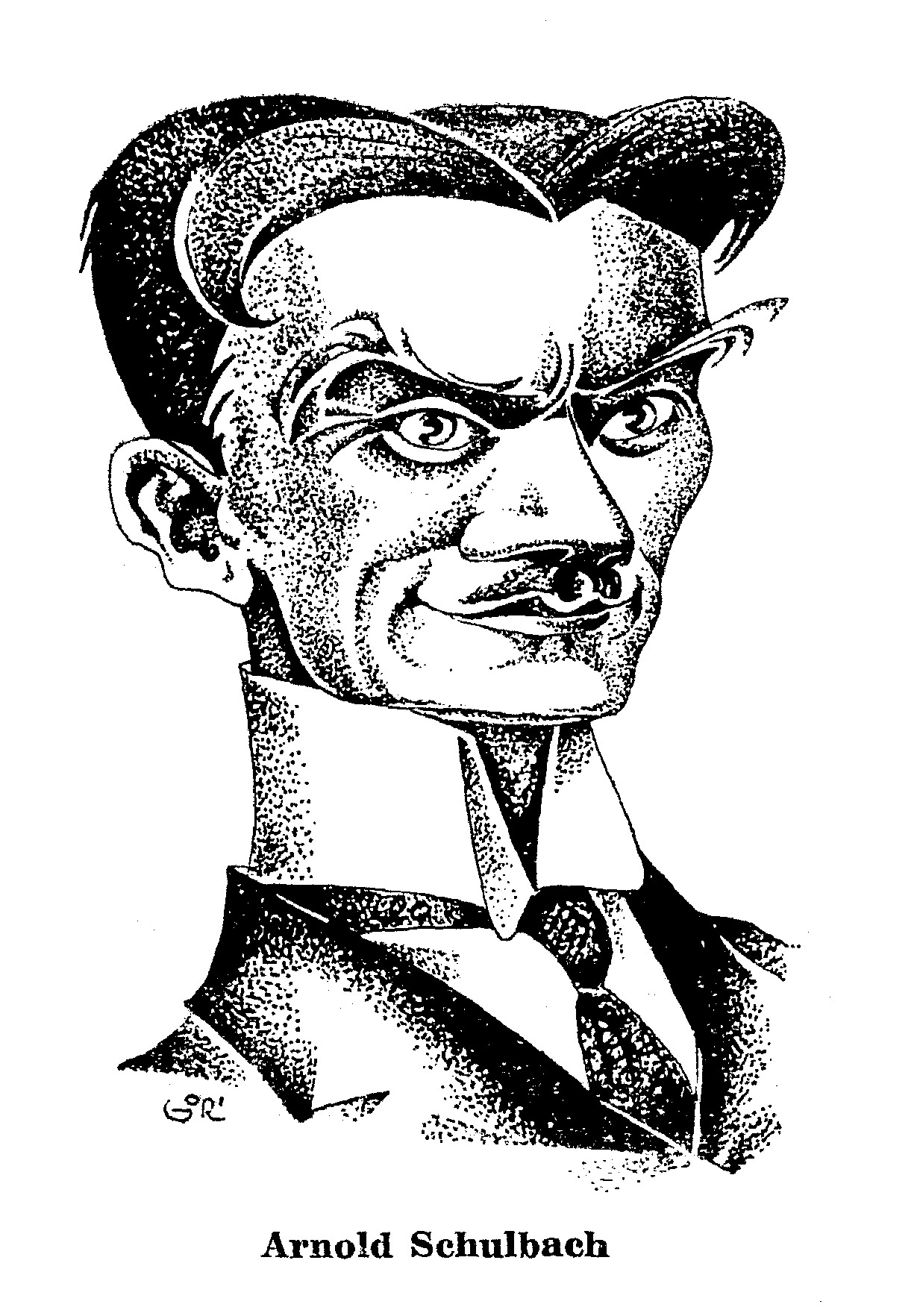
Arnold Süvalep, Õitsituled, 1922

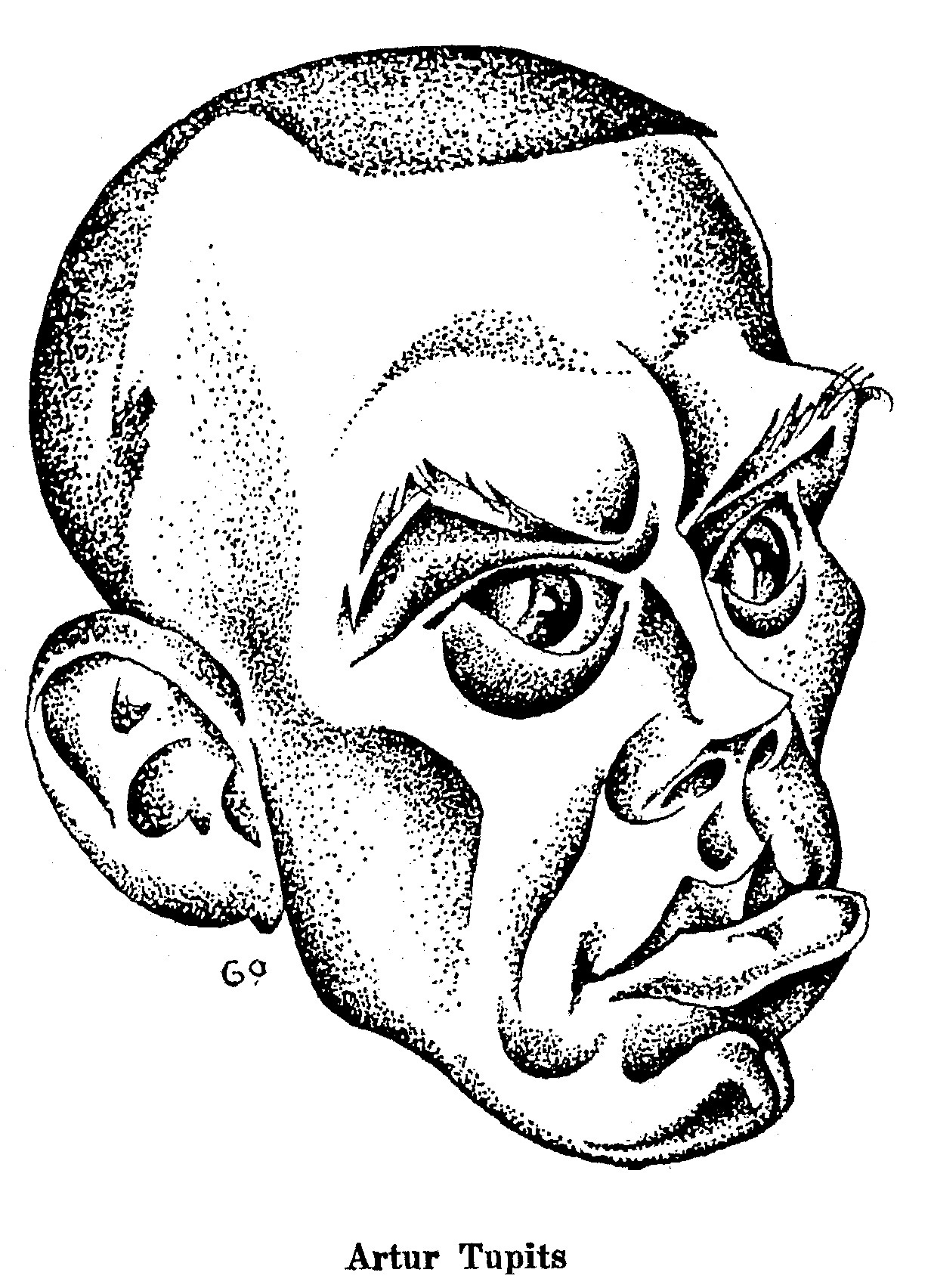
Artur Tupits, Õitsituled, 1922

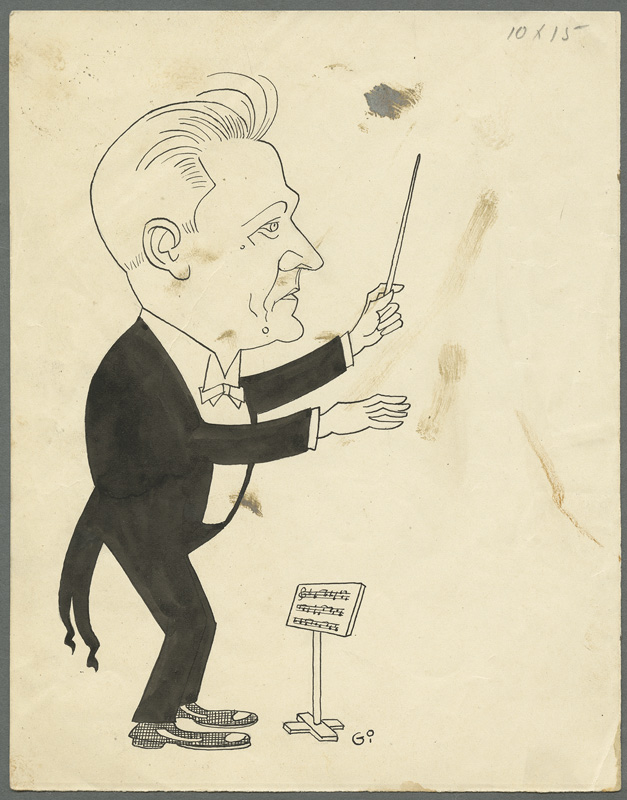
Juhan Aavik

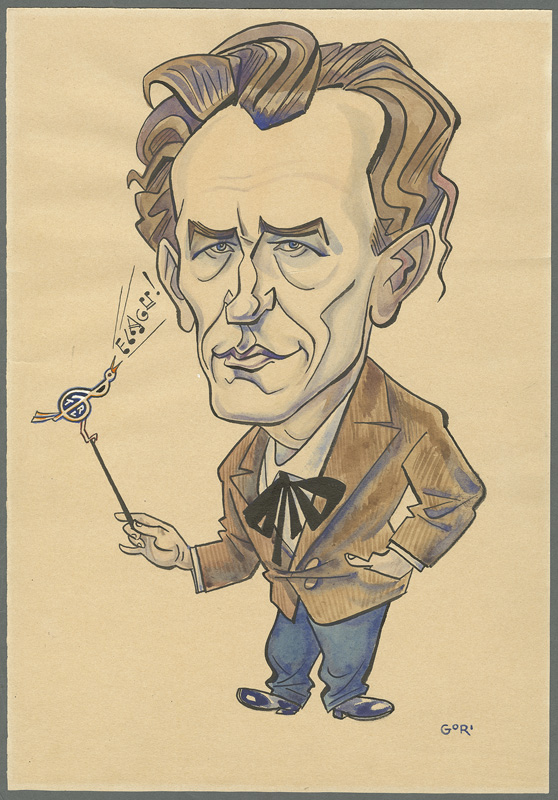
Tuudur Vettik

=== Political cartoons ===
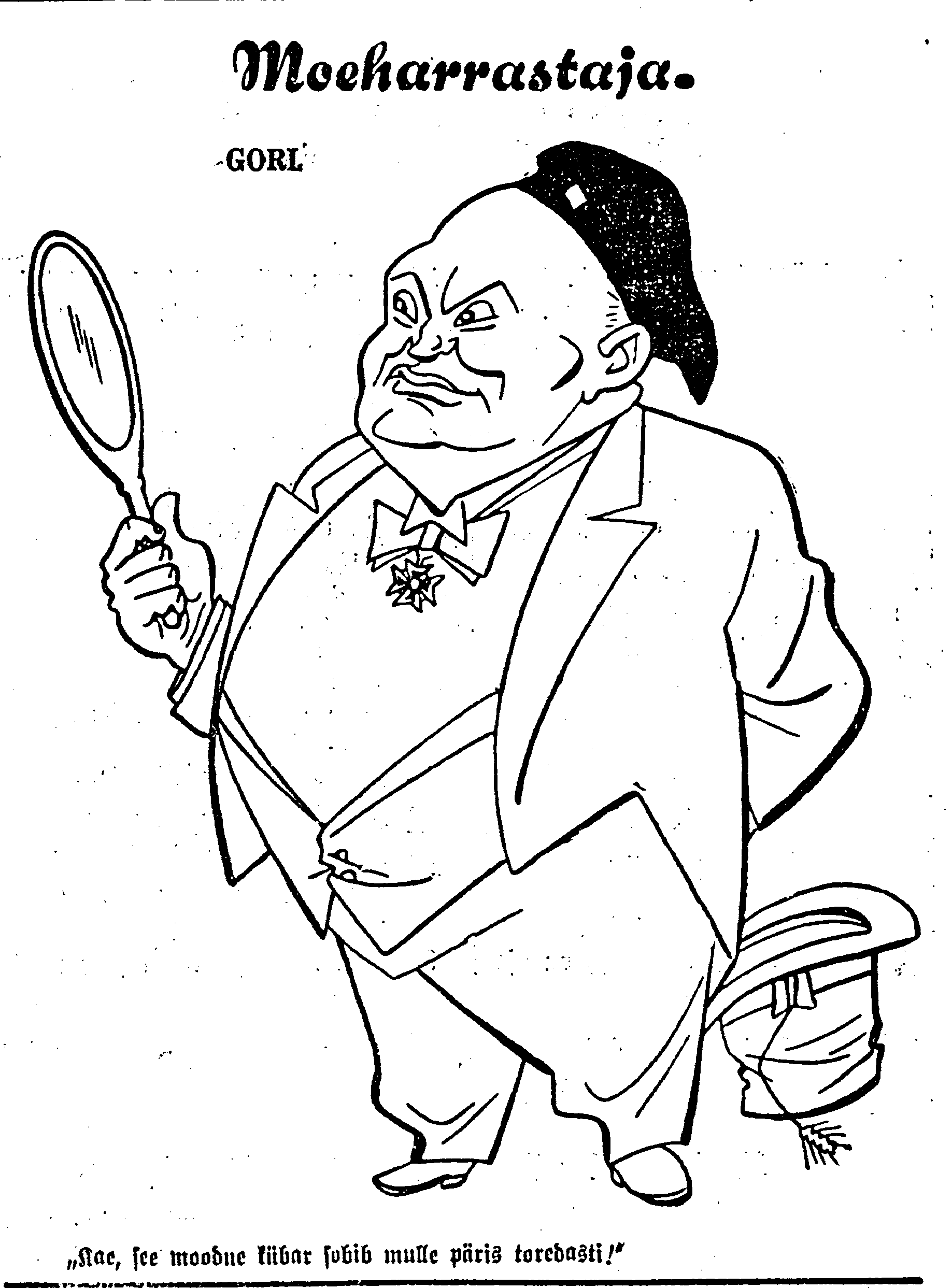
"Moeharrastaja" (A Fashion Enthusiast), Waba Maa, June 27, 1933

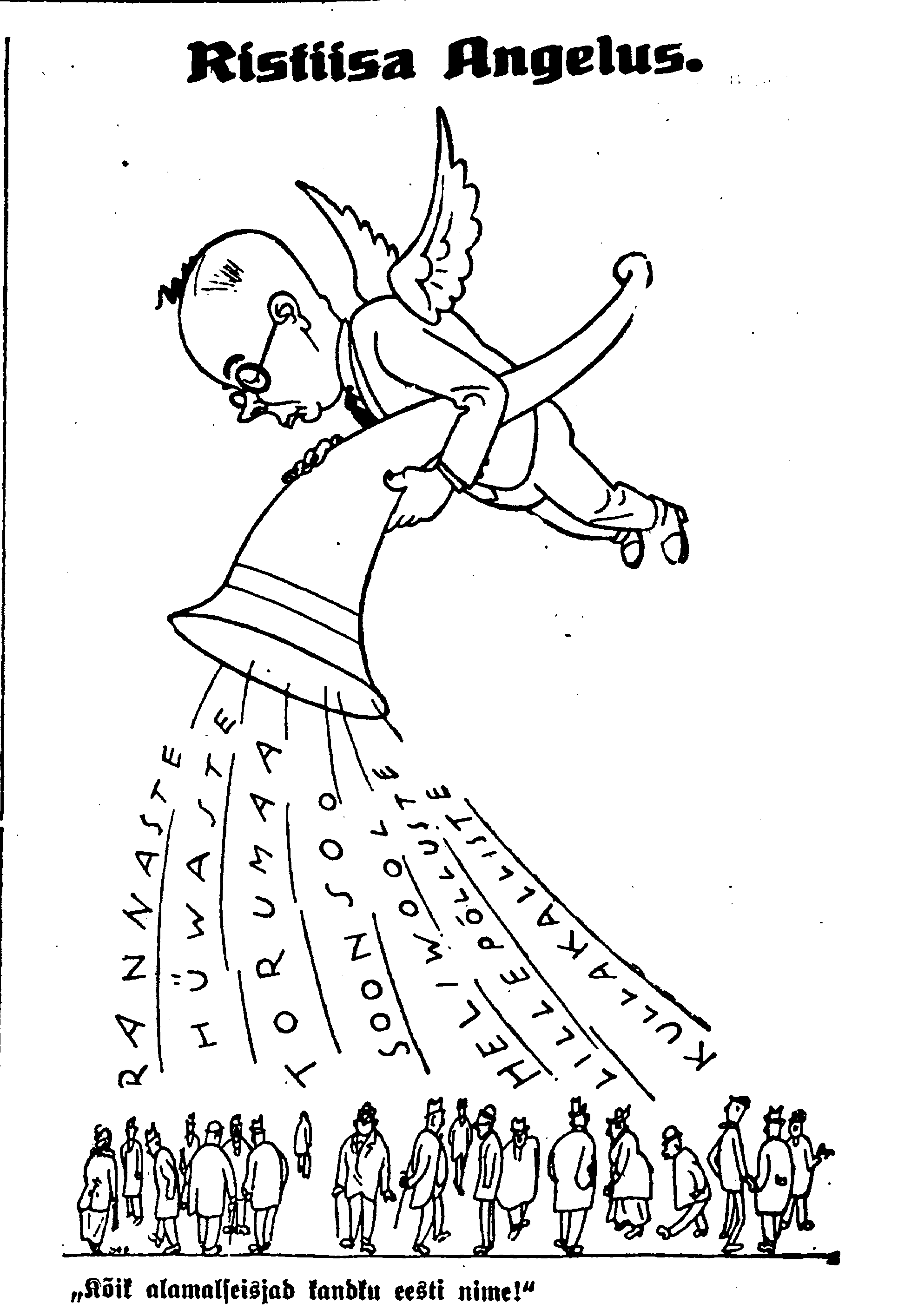
"Ristiisa Angelus" (Godfather Angelus), Waba Maa, May 22, 1936

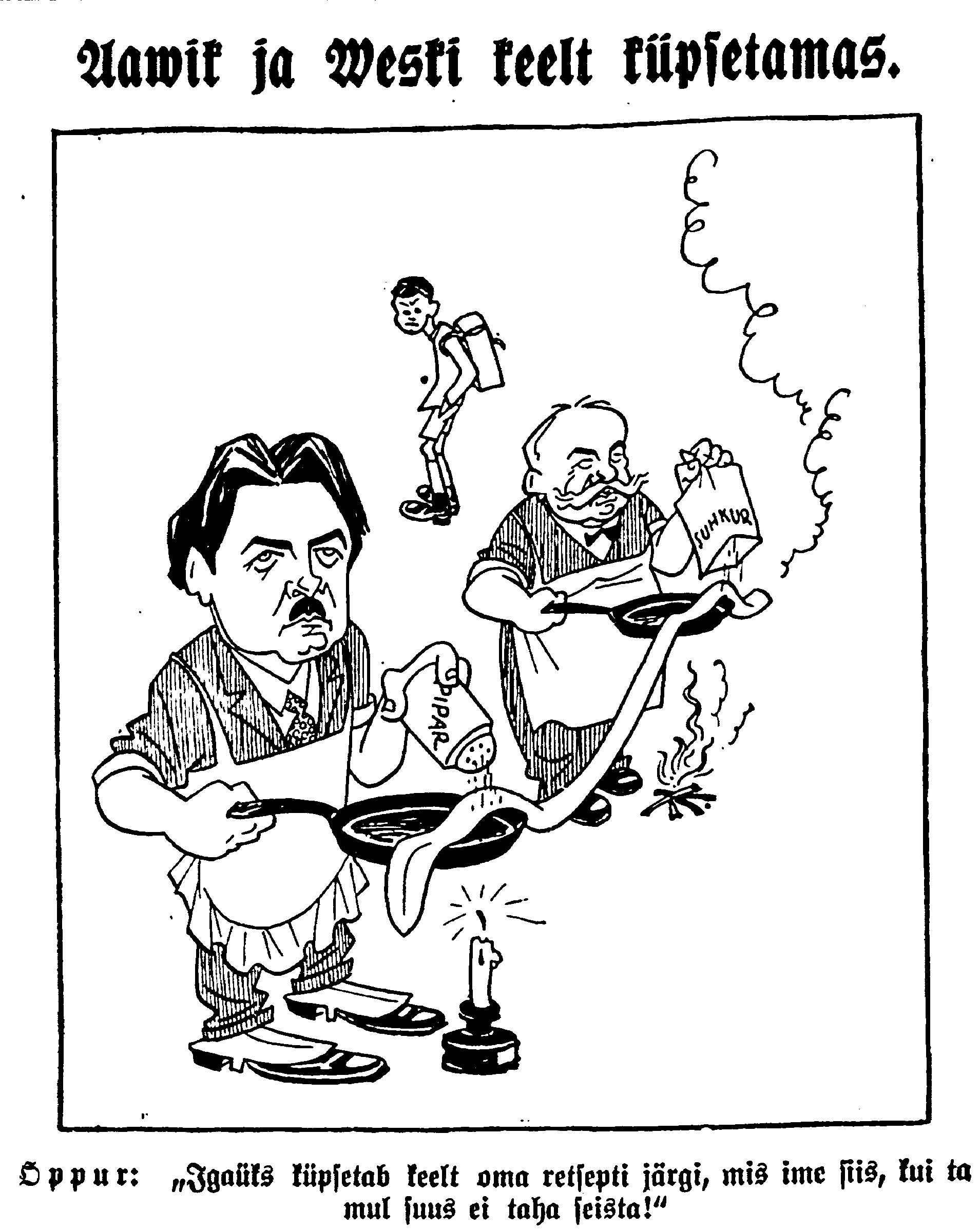
"Aavik ja Veski keelt küpsetamas" (Aavik and Veski Cooking Tongue), Waba Maa, February 20, 1936

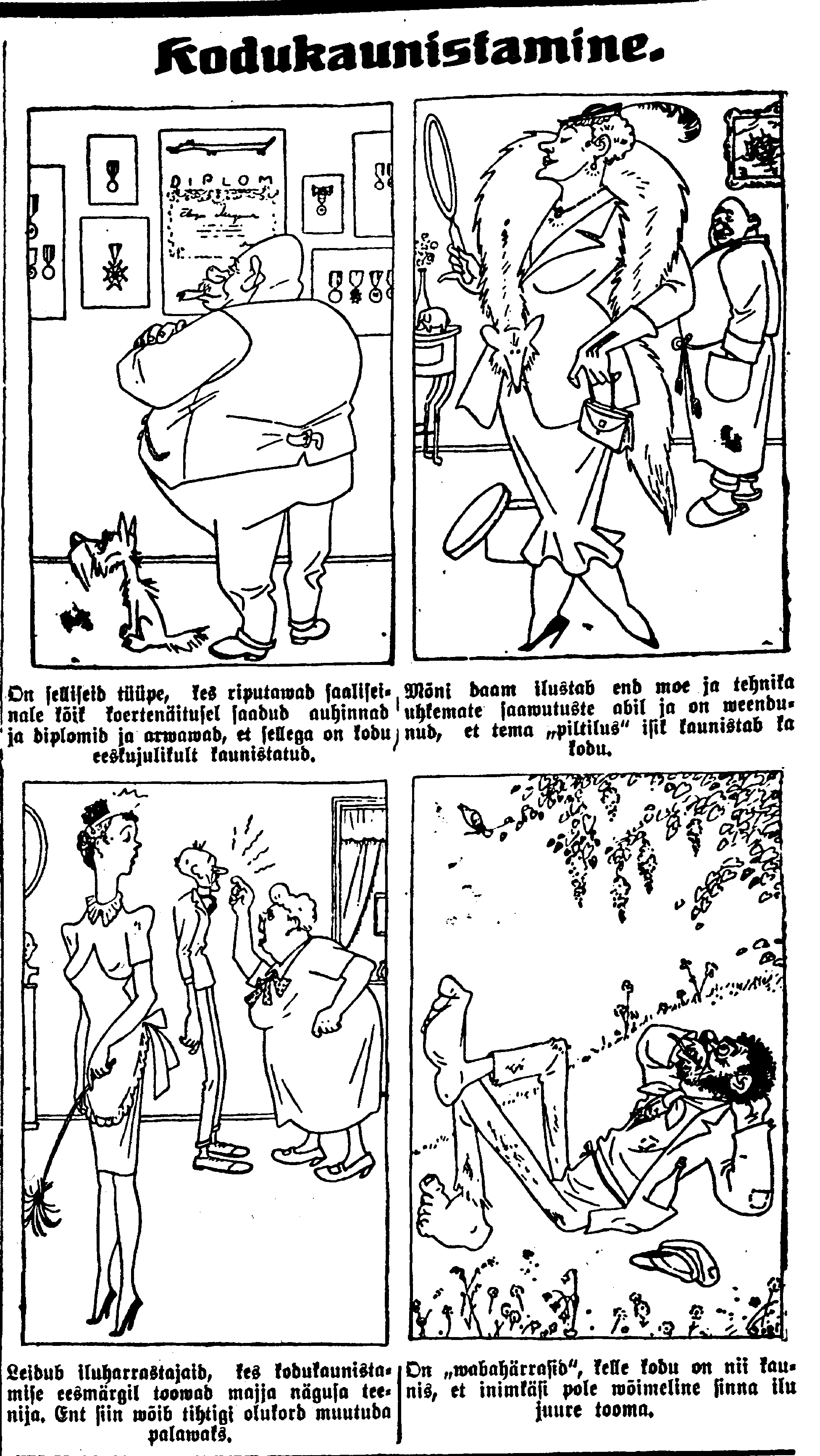
"Kodukaunistamine" (Home Decorating), Waba Maa, May 9, 1936

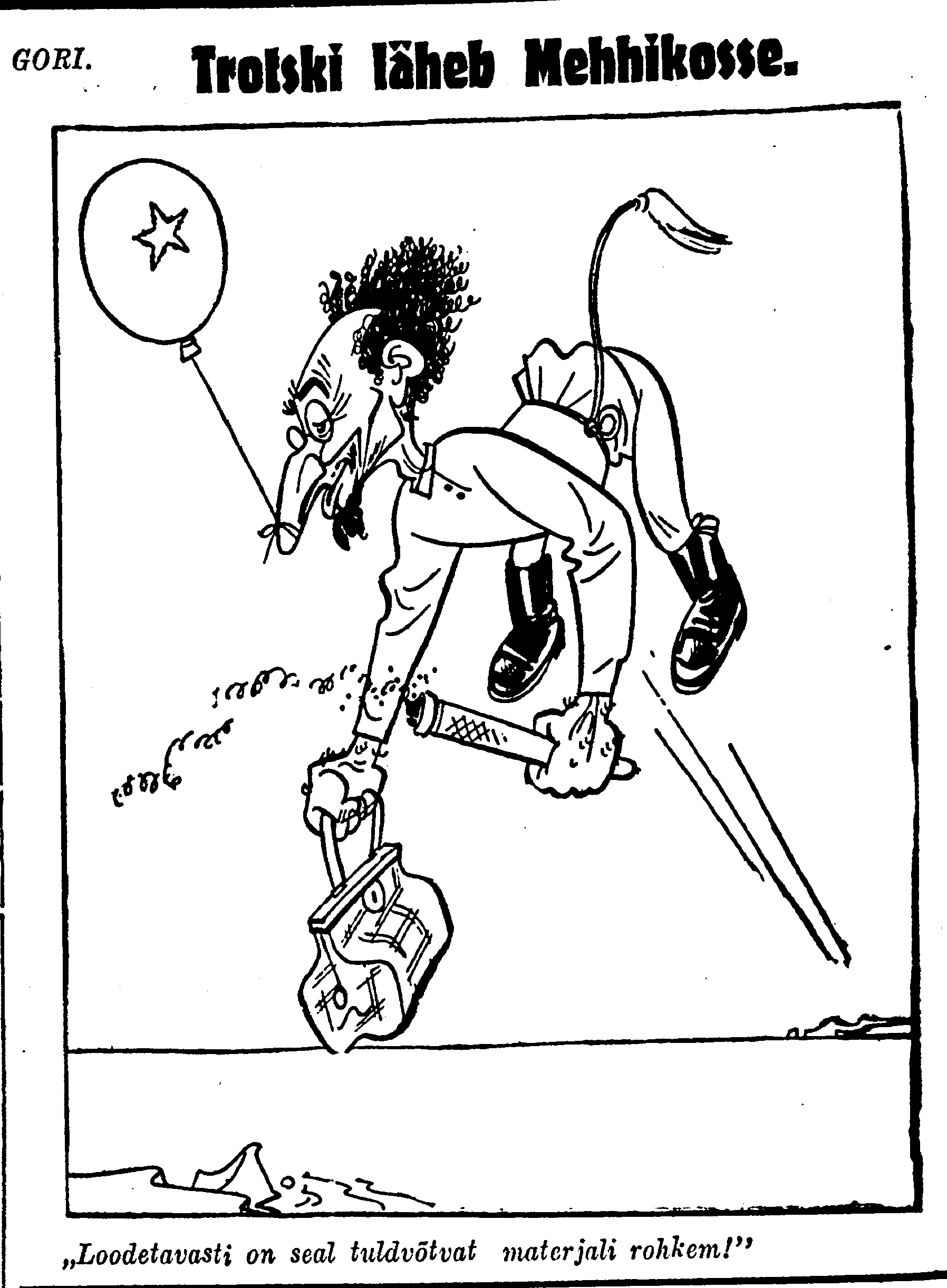
Trotski läheb Mehhikosse (Trotsky Goes to Mexico), Waba Maa, December 29, 1936

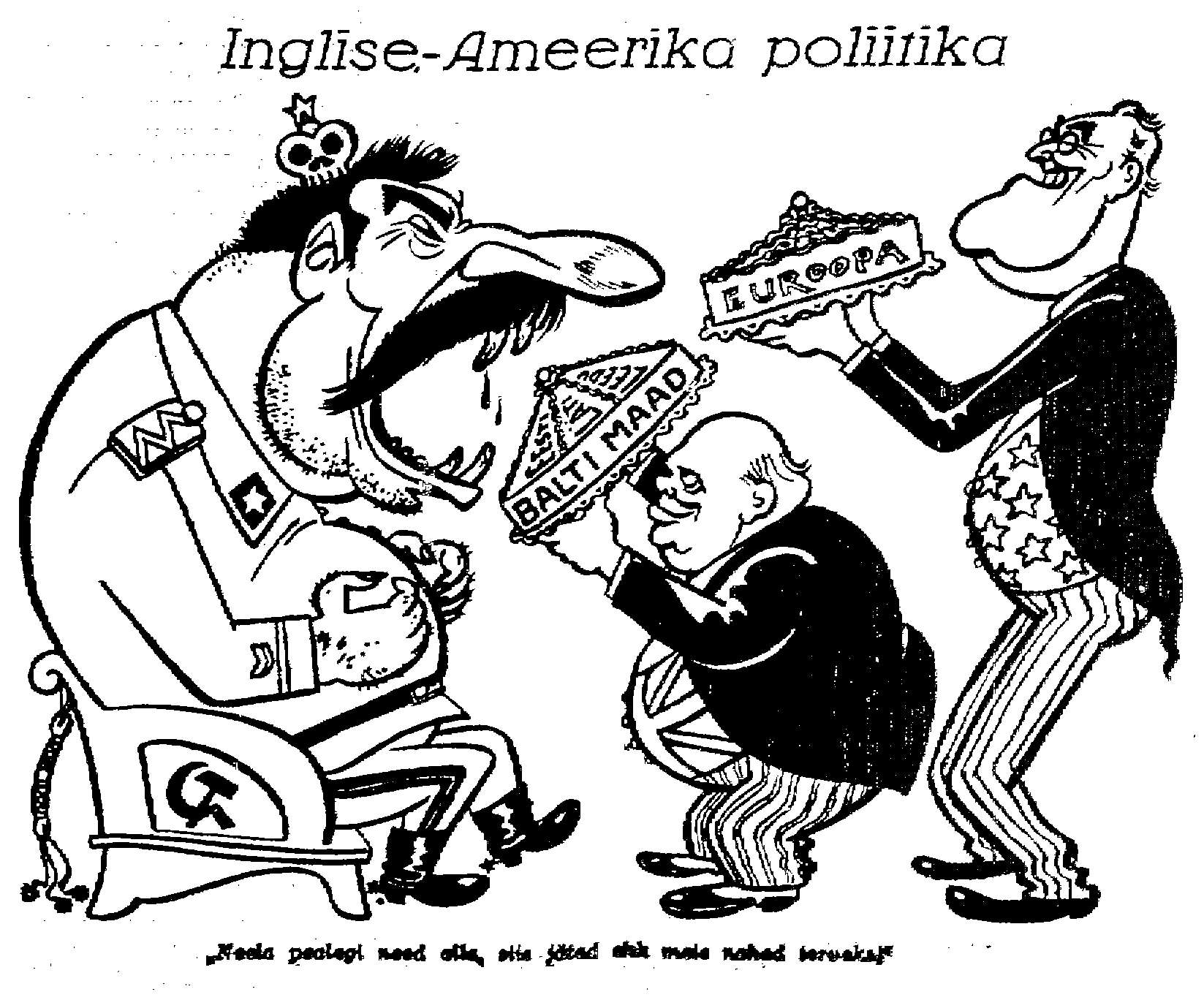
"Inglise-Ameerika poliitika" (Anglo-American Politics), Eesti Sõna, March 18, 1943

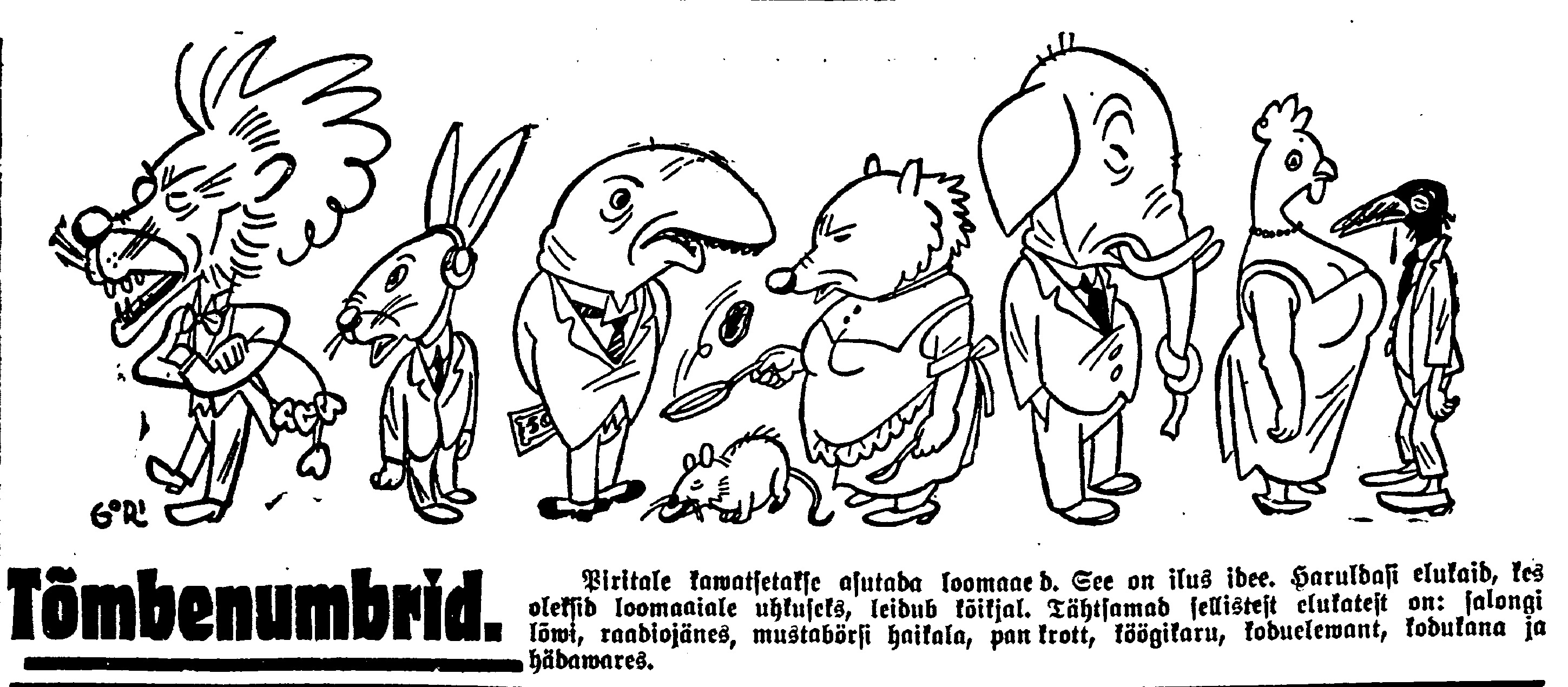
"Tõmbenumbrid" (Attractions), Waba Maa March 18, 1936

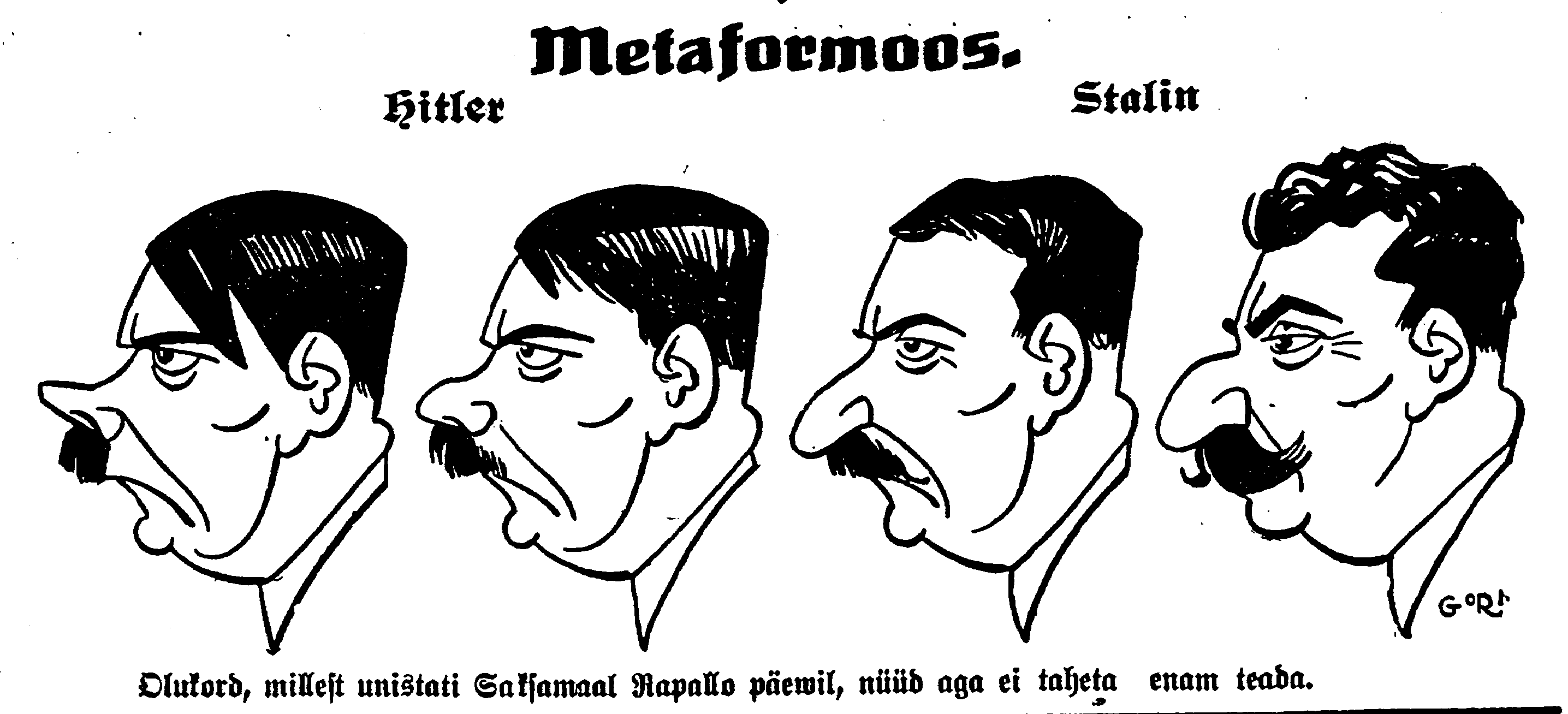
"Metaformoos" (The Metaphormosis), Waba Maa, March 25, 1936

== Exhibitions ==
Works by Gori appeared at international exhibitions in Germany, Austria, Sweden, including the Nordic Society caricature exhibition in Lübeck (1930–1931) and Stockholm (1932), and general exhibitions of Estonian art in Paris, Lübeck, and Kiel (1929), Cologne, and Copenhagen (1929–1930).

== Published works ==
- Gori Lori. Kerge genre. Monoloogid ja dialoog (Gori Lori. A Light Genre. Monologues and Dialogue). Tallinn, 1920.
- Jänes-Koljat. Muinasjutt lastele (The Hare Goliath. A Fairy Tale for Children). Tallinn, 1920.
- Kaluri Miku. Lastejutt piltidega (Miku the Fisherman. An Illustrated Children's Story). Tallinn, 1921.
- Kiisu-Kiisu! Lastenaljad (Kitty-Kitty! Jokes for Children). Tallinn, 1920.
- Knock-out. Karikatuurid ja vested (Knock-Out. Caricatures and Satires). Tallinn, 1928; 2. trükk Faatum 1999.
- Kollane, must, valge. Lastelugu piltidega (Yellow, Black, White. An Illustrated Children's Story). Pärnu, 1920.
- Kriimustused. Naljandid (Scratches. Jokes). Tallinn, 1921.
- Lood lastele (Stories for Children). Tallinn, 1921.
- Lõbus ABD lastele (A Fun ABC for Children). Pärnu, 1922.
- Lõbus lumememm. Laste jõululeht (The Funny Snowman. A Children's Christmas Booklet). Pärnu, 1921.
- Miku imelikud juhtumised tähestikuga. Lastelugu – piltidega (Miku's Peculiar Events with the Alphabet. A Children's Story—Illustrated). Tallinn, 1922.
- Muiked wingus. Naljandid (Sullen Smiles. Jokes). Tallinn, 1921.
- Nipet-Näpet. Lastenaljad (Odds and Ends. Children's Jokes). Tallinn, 1920.
- Sõdur Sass. Lastelugu (Sass the Soldier. A Children's Story). Tallinn, 1919.
- Uudishimuline pärdik. Lastelugu piltidega (A Curious Curmudgeon. An Illustrated Children's Story). Tallinn, 1923.
- Vorstivalmistaja Haim. Hirmus ja õudne naljakas lugu kõvade närvidega lastele (Haim the Sausage Maker. A Scary and Spooky Funny Story for Children with Strong Nerves). Pärnu, 1920.

== Commemoration ==
In 2023, the animated documentary Gorikaturist was released.

== Personal life ==
On June 21, 1920, Gori married Lydia Viitpom (a.k.a. Viiu Agori, 1898–?), and they had sons, Vello (1921–1974) and Olev (1925–1985). Even when naming his sons, Gori made a joke: Olev is essentially Vello written backwards. Both sons had a talent for drawing and a sense of humor, but difficult times did not favor the development of their talent. Olev became a tram driver, and Vello was a radio repairman.
