= Eesti Päevaleht =

Newspaper in Estonia

Coordinates: 59°26′16.76″N 24°45′58.08″E

- Type: Daily newspaper
- Owner(s): AS Ekspress Grupp, Jaan Manitski
- Publisher: Eesti Päevalehe AS
- Editor-in-chief: Urmo Soonvald
- Managing editor: Mihkel Reinsalu
- Opinion editor: Külli-Riin Tigasson
- Photo editor: Merike Pinn
- Founded: 5 June 1995
- Ceased publication: 15 April 2024 (print)
- Language: Estonian
- Headquarters: Tallinn, Estonia
- Circulation: 7,400 (as of February 2024)
- ISSN: 1406-0779
- Website: www.epl.ee

Eesti Päevaleht (Estonia Daily) is a major daily Estonian newspaper, from the same publishers as the weekly Eesti Ekspress.

Another newspaper under the same name is published weekly in Stockholm, Sweden.

== History and profile ==
Eesti Päevaleht was founded on 5 June 1995, when the newspapers Hommikuleht, Päevaleht (previously Noorte Hääl), and Rahva Hääl were merged into a single publication. On 29 September 1995, Eesti Päevaleht merged with Eesti Sõnumid.

In May 2011, the newspaper joined the Eesti Ajalehed group.

In early 2024, it was announced that the paper edition would be discontinued from April of the same year, but the digital version of the publication would continue to be published as part of the Delfi portal. As of 5 January 2026, the publication was also discontinued online.
