= Gustav Mootse =

Estonian printmaker and painter (1885–1957)

- Born: July 15, 1885; Võnnu Parish, Estonia
- Died: November 16, 1957 (aged 72); Viljandi, Estonia
- Education: School of Technical Drawing of Baron Alexander von Stieglitz, Saint Petersburg Academy of Sciences
- Occupations: Printmaker and painter

Gustav Mootse (July 15, 1885 – November 16, 1957) was an Estonian printmaker and painter.

== Early life and education ==
Gustav Mootse was born at the Kristjan-Jaani farm in Võnnu Parish, Estonia, the son of Jaan Mootse (Mootze, 1847–1930) and Ann Mootse (née Kerge, 1848–1918). He learned to read at home and attended the Võnnu village school (1894–1897), and then he attended St George's Parish School in Tartu (1897–1899). He also studied at Tartu High School (1899–1903) and Hugo Treffner High School (1903–1904). At the recommendation of and with material support from Jaan Tõnisson, Mootse traveled to Saint Petersburg to acquire an art education. He studied ink drawing and xylography at the School of Technical Drawing of Baron Alexander von Stieglitz (1904–1909) and then wood engraving at the studio of Vasily Mate of the Saint Petersburg Academy of Sciences (1909–1912). Later he improved his skills at the Leipzig School of Graphic Design and Book Illustration (1926–1927). In 1928, he traveled to Italy, where he was particularly interested in ancient and Renaissance art.

== Career ==
Mootse worked as a drawing teacher, technical draftsman, and book illustrator in Saint Petersburg. Under the pseudonym Foma Urvanov (Фома Урванов), he contributed to illustrated and cartoon magazines and newspapers in Saint Petersburg. For example, he worked as a cartoonist for the weekly satirical magazine Пугачъ (Pugach).

Mootse fell ill with a pulmonary disease and returned to Estonia in 1918. He was a drawing teacher at Põltsamaa High School (1919–1922) and Rakvere Normal School (1922–1926), and in Rakvere he also taught Hando Mugasto and Romulus Tiitus. Starting in 1928, he worked in several schools in Viljandi, and he worked as a lecturer in teacher training courses during the summer. In the jubilee article for his 50th birthday, Gustav Mootse was called one of the most significant or best drawing teachers in Estonia of his time. From 1947 to 1952, he worked as a research employee at the Viljandi Museum, from which he retired in 1953. He lived at Kunderi 9 in Viljandi from 1936 until 1957.

Gustav Mootse was a member of the Estonian Artists' Association.

== Work ==
Gustav Mootse's first published work was the cover illustration for Kiired III, published in 1902 under the editorship of Gustav Suits. His illustrations appeared in the publications Нива, Весь Мир, Tuuslar, Lasteleht}, Linda, and Sädemed. The motifs were idyllic landscapes with farmhouses and beach views, and there are many heartfelt scenes from the life of children.

Gustav Mootse was known as a prolific and enthusiastic creator of small graphics, specifically bookplates. In total, more than 250 bookplates are known by him, the majority of which are stereotypes and woodcuts, and a smaller part of which are drypoint illustrations. When creating bookplates, Mootse used a lot of name symbols; for example, Karin Lind's bookplate with a crow (cf. Estonian lind 'crow') and a book is expressive. Sometimes name symbols and professional emblems are combined; for example, Tõnis Vint's bookplate features a small songbird (cf. Estonian vint 'finch') and tailoring emblems. There are also many bookplates with images of readers. Bookplates created by Gustav Mootse were exhibited in Moscow in 1962.

Mootse's paintings, mostly watercolors, depict beautiful views of the surroundings of Karksi and Viljandi, parks, and castle ruins in Viljandi. The artist especially loved autumn nature, which is depicted with a lyrical feeling. Mootse also created several high-quality flower paintings. The artist was also interested in symbolism and the world of fairy tales with water nymphs and magic.

== Bibliography ==
- 1921: Analüütiline ja eksperimentaalpsüholoogilise joonistamise õpetus (Analytical and Experimental Psychological Drawing)
- 1921: Vesivärvide õpetus (Watercolor)
- 1921: Perspektiivi õpetus I–II (Perspective 1–2)
- 1921: Voolimise õpetus (Molding)
- 1925: Värvide kokkukõla õpetus (Color Harmony)
- 1925: Esteetika ja kunst (Aesthetics and Art)
