= Otto Krusten =

Estonian caricaturist (1888–1937)

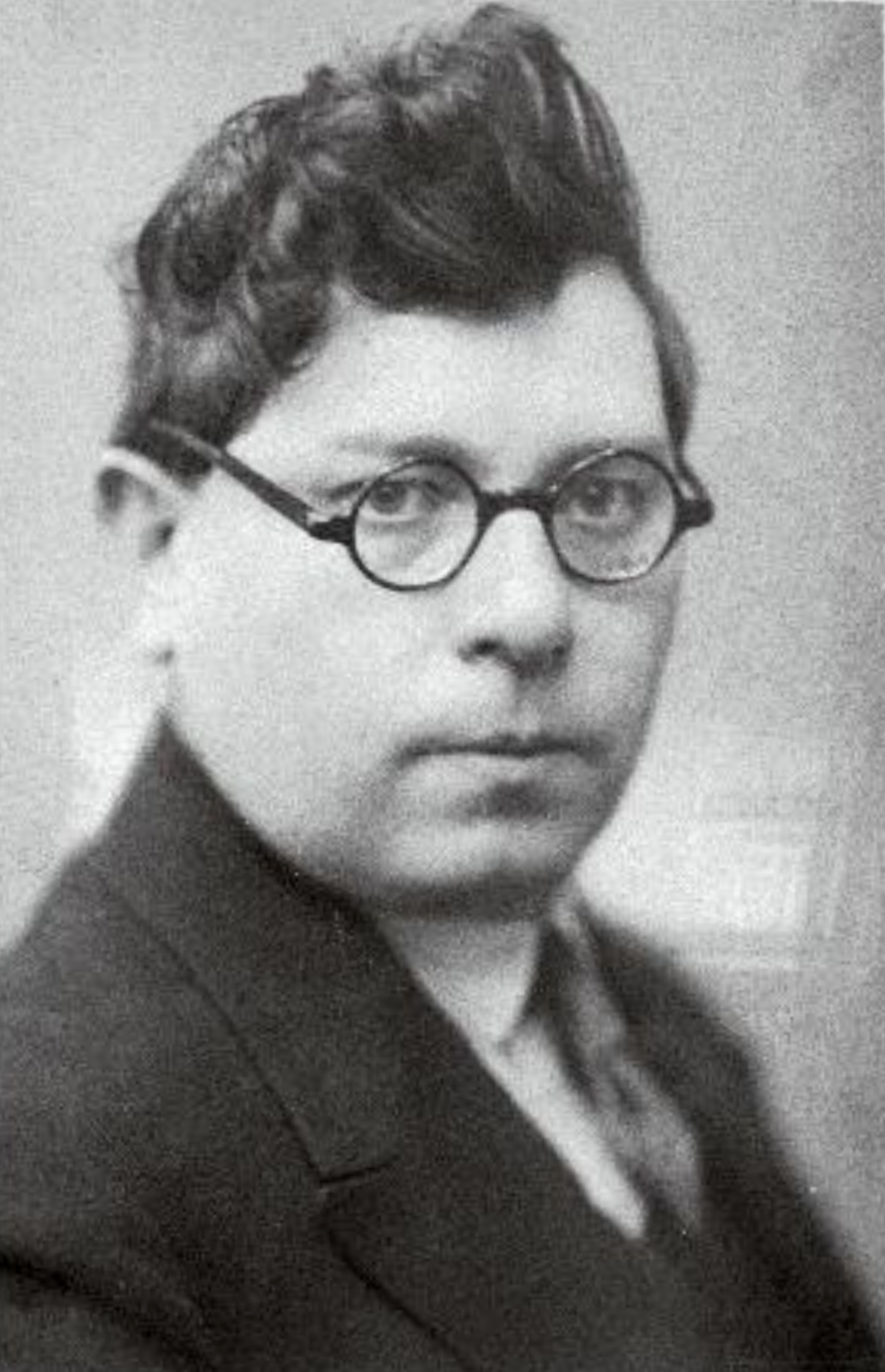
- Born: June 18, 1888; Muraste, Estonia
- Died: February 23, 1937 (aged 48); Tallinn, Estonia
- Education: Ants Laikmaa's studio, Imperial Society for the Encouragement of the Arts
- Occupation: Caricaturist

Otto Krusten (born Krustein, pseudonym Raudnõges; June 18, 1888 – February 23, 1937) was an Estonian caricaturist.

== Early life and education ==
Otto Krusten was born in Muraste, the son of Jaan Krusten (1856–1927), a gardener at Muraste Manor, and Triina Krusten (née Franso, 1858–1914). He studied at Ants Laikmaa's studio from 1905 to 1907, and then audited courses from 1907 to 1908 and from 1911 to 1913 at the Imperial Society for the Encouragement of the Arts in Saint Petersburg. He was the brother of the writers Pedro Krusten and Erni Krusten, and the uncle of the literary scholar Reet Krusten.

== Career ==
Krusten worked in Tallinn in 1919 as an official of the Northern Estonian Art Protection Committee of the Ministry of Education. From 1922 to 1927, he worked in the editorial office of the newspaper Postimees in Tartu. From 1924 to 1926, he edited Sädemed, a humor supplement to Postimees founded by Karl August Hindrey in 1905. In 1922, together with Vello Agori (Gori) and Harald Vellner, he published the magazine Tohuwabohu (only one issue appeared). In 1927, he started working in the editorial office of Kratt, a humor supplement of the newspaper Päevaleht in Tallinn, and from 1932 to 1936 he was the managing editor of the magazine. He was a member of the Siuru literary movement and the Estonian Artists Group.

A year before his death, he fell ill with a disease that paralyzed his arms and legs.

Otto Krusten was buried on February 27 at Rahumäe Cemetery.

== Caricatures and cartoons ==
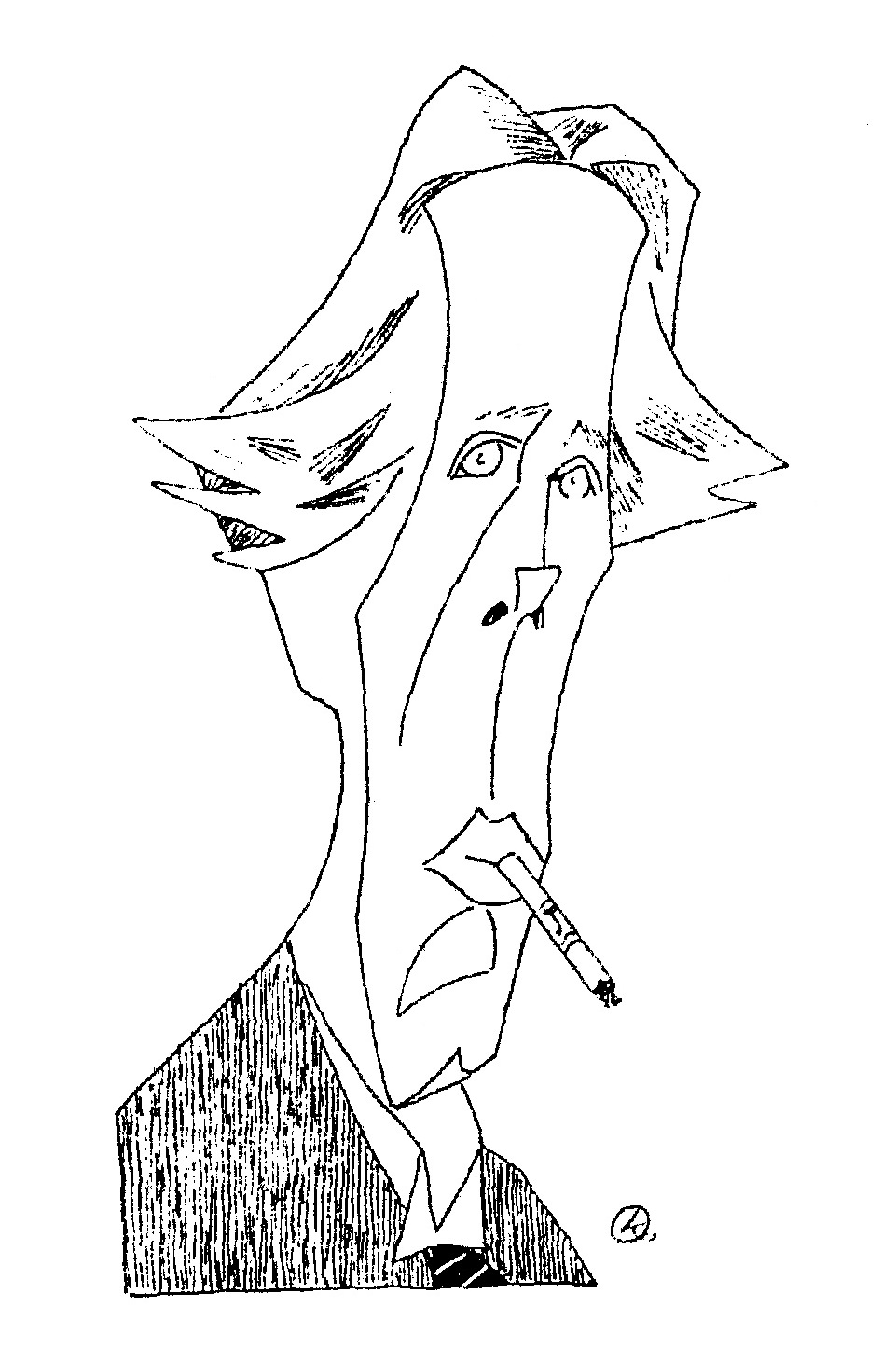
Vello Agori (Gori)

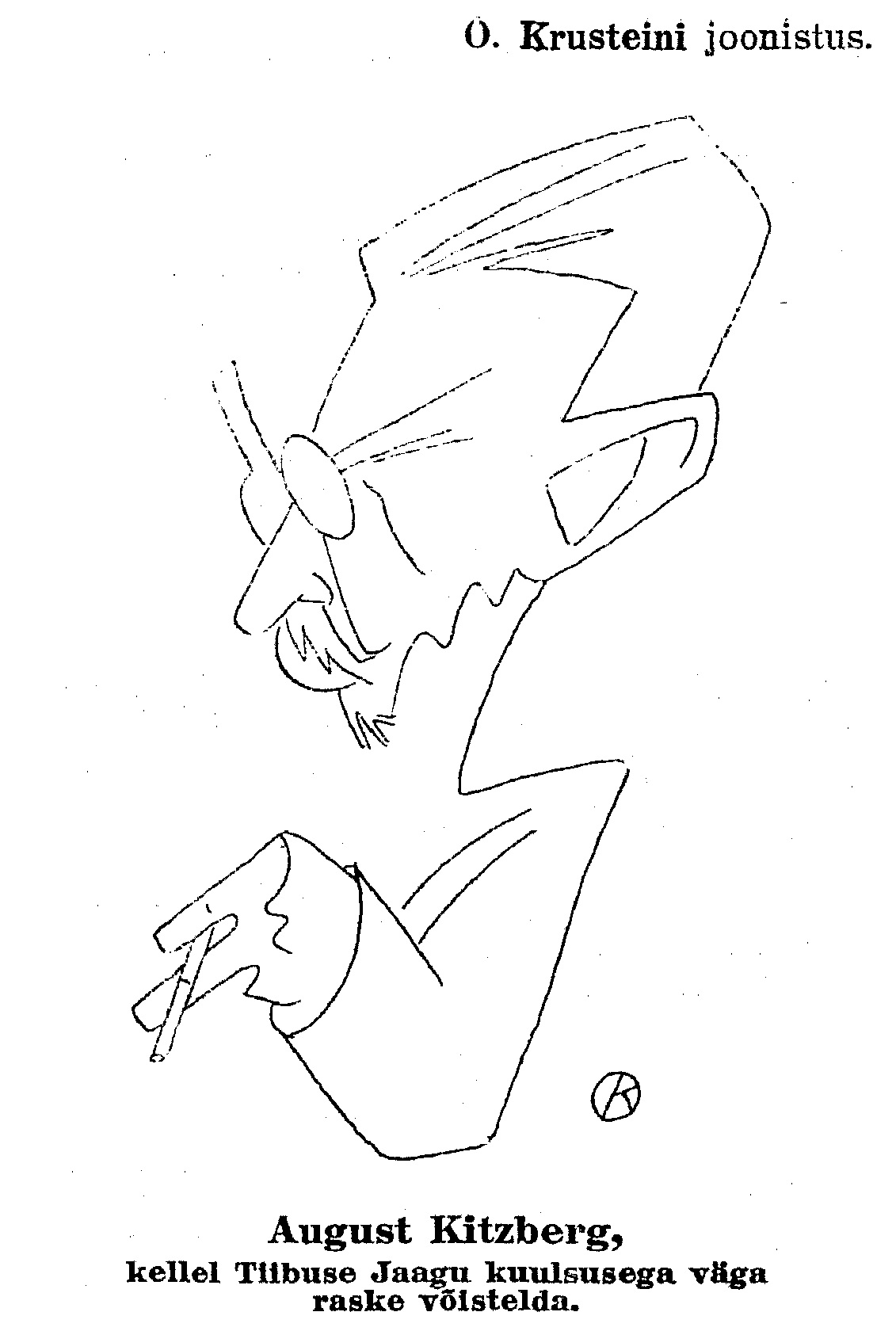
August Kitzberg

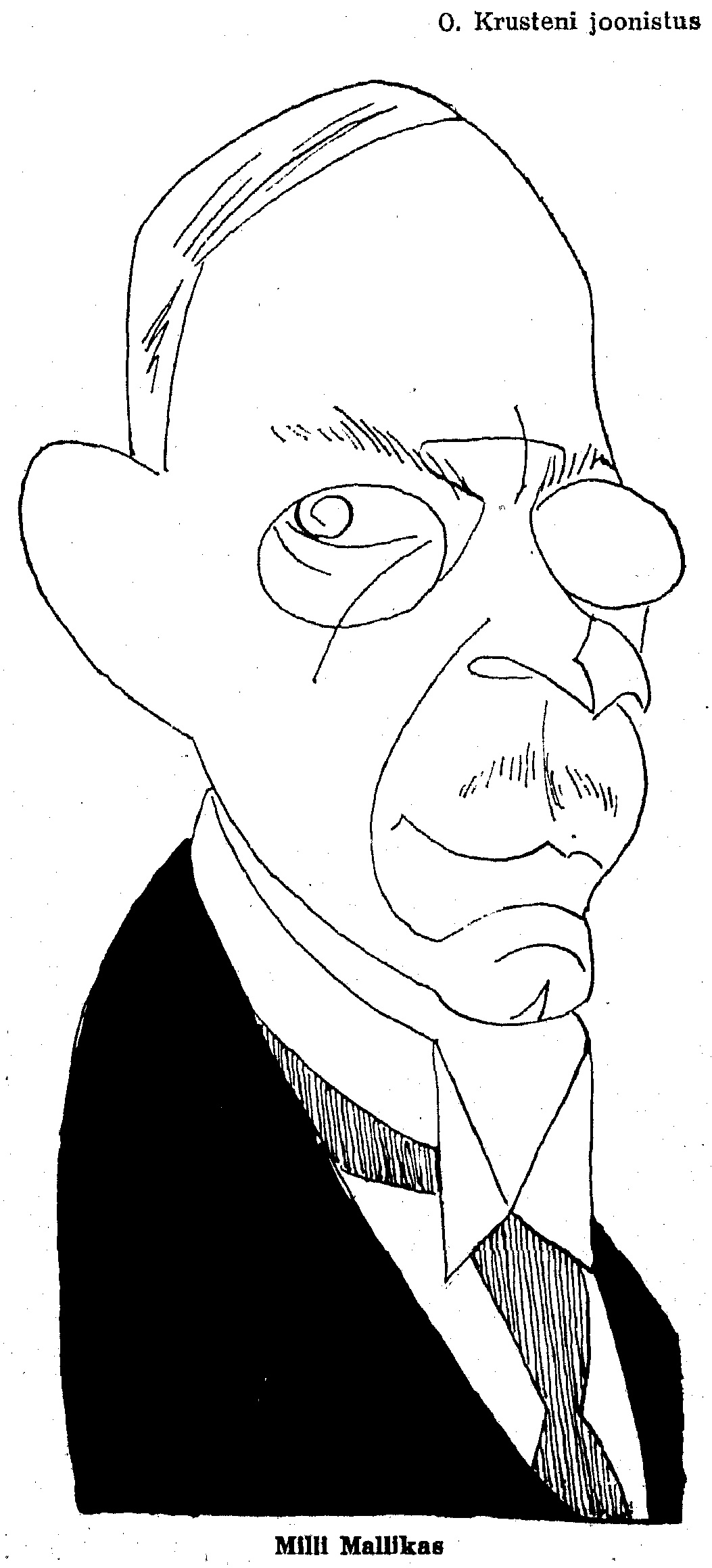
Hugo Raudsepp

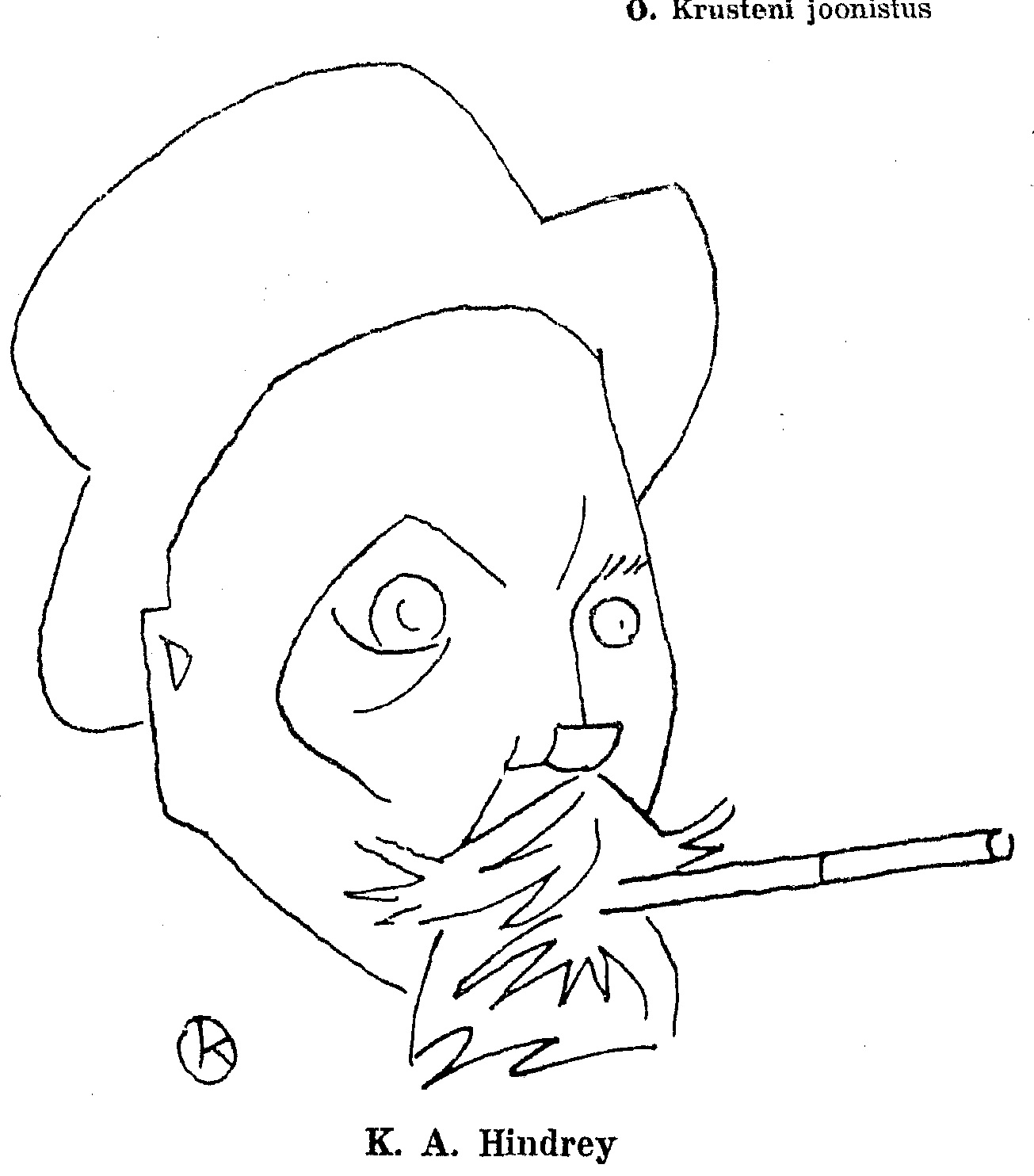
Karl August Hindrey

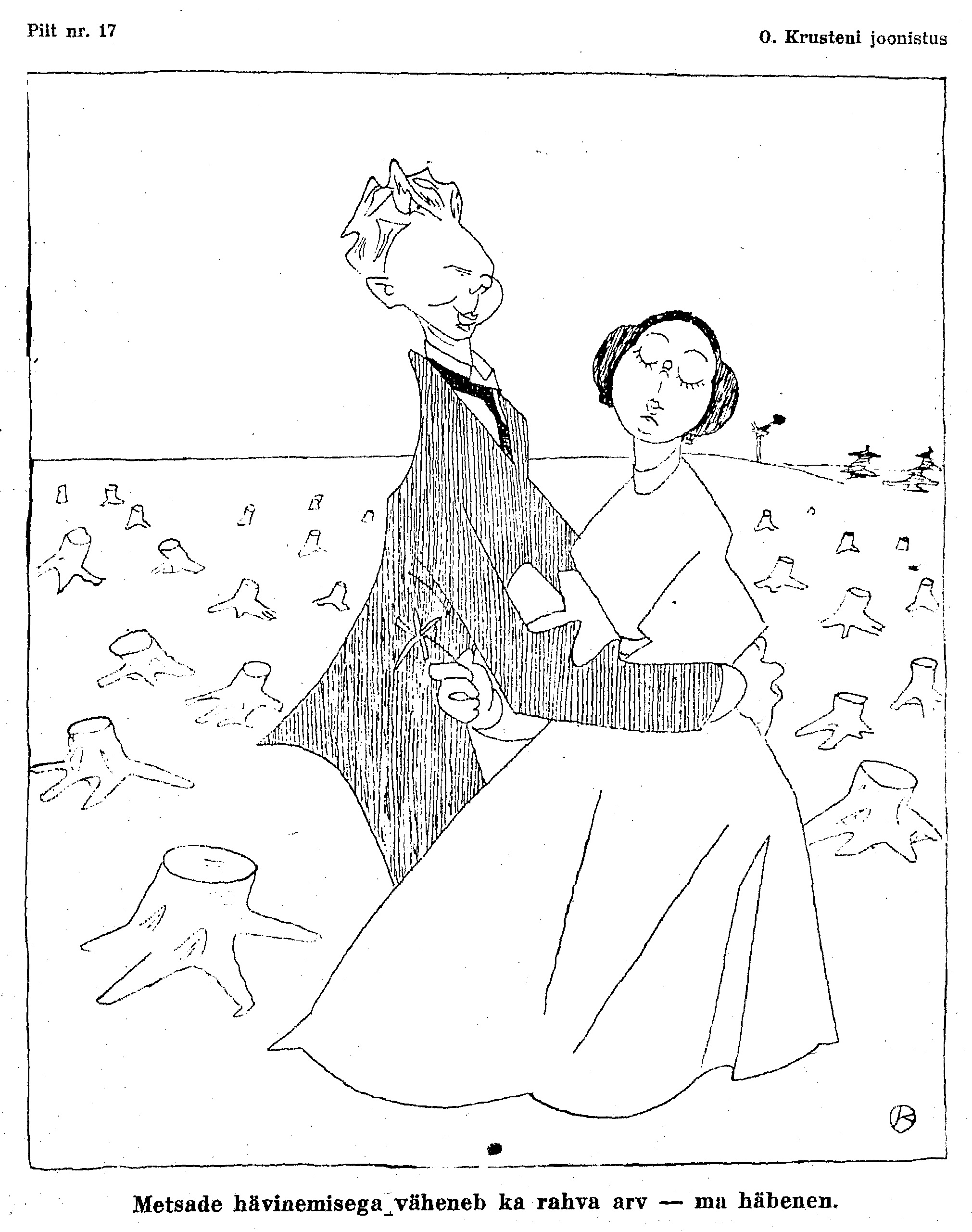
"Forest Destruction"
