= Tuuslar =

Tuuslar may refer to:

- Tuuslar (1922 magazine), an Estonian magazine
- Tuuslar (1928 magazine), an Estonian magazine
- Tuuslar, a figure in Estonian mythology
