= Arnold Vihvelin =

Estonian printmaker and painter (1892–1962)

- Born: April 10, 1892; Rääbise, Jõgeva Parish, Governorate of Livonia, Russian Empire
- Died: April 20, 1962 (aged 70); Viljandi, then part of Estonian SSR, Soviet Union
- Education: Kristjan Raud's studio, Imperial Society for the Encouragement of the Arts, Imperial Academy of Arts
- Occupations: Printmaker and painter

Arnold Peeter Vihvelin (surname also spelled Vichvelin and Wihwelin; April 10, 1892 – April 20, 1962) was an Estonian printmaker and painter.

== Early life and education ==
Arnold Vihvelin was born in Rääbise, the son Hans Vihvelin (1845–1915) and Elisabeth Vihvelin (née Stamm; 1873–1967). His father, a forester for Rääbise Manor, collected folk songs and sent them to Friedrich Reinhold Kreutzwald. The family had its own library. The future artist started painting at the age six, following the example of his older cousin, who was a portrait painter.

In 1905, Vihvelin worked as a student at the Laiuse pharmacy. He graduated at the same time from Torma Primary School. While he was earning a living as a draftsman in Tartu, he studied drawing and painting with Rudolf Julius von zur Mühlen in the evenings and attended Kristjan Raud's studio from 1906 to 1909. Vihvelin took part in the graphics competition held in Karlsruhe and won second place. In 1910, with a recommendation from Peter Barth (inspector of the Tartu secondary school) he entered the Imperial Society for the Encouragement of the Arts in Saint Petersburg and immediately passed the exam to enter the third year. In 1911, he chose Ivan Bilibin's printmaking class as his specialty, while also attending the pen drawing class of Nikolay Samokish and Tadeusz Jan Dmochowski. Peet Aren, August Roosileht, Jaan Vahtra, Konrad Mägi, and others studied at the same school with him. Vihvelin studied in Saint Petersburg from 1910 to 1914.

From 1914 to 1920, Vihvelin studied at the Imperial Academy of Arts. He studied under Vasily Mate from 1914 to 1916. Some of his works from that time were published in the Estonian art students' magazine Ronk, which had a total of eight issues, containing poetry, prose, and art students' copies of works of art. Mate died in 1917, and the academy did not immediately find a new professor of printmaking. Vihvelin continued his studies in the landscape studio as a student of Arkady Rylov. Vihvelin graduated from the academy in 1918.

== Career ==
In 1918, Vihvelin participated in founding the Petrograd art society Lennok. In 1920, he started working as a drawing teacher in Rakvere. In 1928, he studied abroad, staying for a long time in Vienna on a scholarship from the Government Fine Arts Endowment. In 1930, Vihvelin moved into Piira Manor and Carl Timoleon von Neff's studio. He was a member of the board of the Rakvere Museum from 1930 to 1931.

== Work ==
Vihvelin's work includes landscape paintings and salon portraits. He also drew illustrations that appeared in the magazine Tuuslar in 1922 and caricatures that were published in the satirical magazine Sädemed in 1926. In 1925, he created the compositions Ketsemani aed (The Garden of Gethsemane) and Colgata (Calvary) for the wing decorations of the altar painting of Saint Peter's Church in Tartu. During the interwar period, he was mainly known for compositions related to the Estonian War of Independence, although he also cultivated other genres. In the postwar period, he completely withdrew from artistic life, apparently fearing repression due to his work during the interwar period, and he did not publicly share the works he produced.
