= Mihkel Tiks =

Estonian writer, theatre personnel and basketball player

Mihkel Tiks (born 11 June 1953 in Tallinn) is an Estonian writer, theatre personnel and basketball player.

In 1978 he graduated from Tartu State University in journalism.

1973-1982 he played basketball at the club Tallinna Kalev. During this time the club won 8 times Estonian championships.

1988-1991 he was the chief editor of the magazine Teater. Muusika. Kino. 1999-2000 he was the county governor of Loksa Parish.

Since 2006 he is living in Crimea, near Yalta.

Since 1989 he is a member of Estonian Writers' Union.

== Publications ==
- Näidend "Lahtihüpe", 1980
- "Korvpalliromaan", Eesti Raamat 1985
- "Ja kui teile siin ei meeldi" (with Tanel Tiks), Revalia 1991
- "Estland selbst entdecken", Huma 1992
- "Muulane ja kohtlane", Eesti Näitemänguagentuur 2001, ISBN 9985784073
- "Mängumees", Tänapäev 2010, ISBN 9789985629635
- "Elumees", Tänapäev 2011, ISBN 9789949270293
- "Ärimees", Tänapäev 2011, ISBN 9789949271108
- "Muidumees", Tänapäev 2012, ISBN 9789949271924
- "Krimmi vang. Ukraina aeg", Tänapäev 2019, ISBN 9789949856237
- "Krimmi vang II. Vene aeg", Tänapäev 2020, ISBN 9789949856244
