= Toomas Raudam =

Estonian writer

Toomas Raudam (born 21 July 1947) is an Estonian writer. In 1989 he won the Friedebert Tuglas Award for Lodus tiivad. He has won or been nominated for several other awards for his books, screenplays, and radio plays. Raudam was born in Paide. In 1973 Raudam graduated from Tartu State University. The next year, Raudam married Kersti Veider, with whom he has one son, Juhan. Graphic artist August Roosileht was Raudam's grandfather.

== Major works ==
- Anti jutud, 1983 (OCLC 31004446)
- Kirjutab näpuga õhku, 1986 (OCLC 18223065)
- Kolmekordne päike, 1988 (ISBN 9785450003634)
- Lodus tiivad, 1989
- Isa sipelgapesa, 1990 (ISBN 9785450012063)
- Tarzani Seiklused Tallinnas, 1991 (OCLC 245745181)
- Kõhklev essee heitlusest ajaga, 1992
- Elus enesetapja, 1999 (ISBN 9789985862728)
- Jaa, 2000 (ISBN 9789985924525)
- Miks Kafka nuttis?, 2000 (ISBN 9789985928493)
- Jaak Kino, Kino-Mati ja teised, 2001 (ISBN 9789985811092)
- Saint-Prousti vastu, 2002 (ISBN 9789985811863)
- Teie, 2003 (ISBN 9789985790434)
- Nips, 2004 (ISBN 9789985790809)
- Tänulikud surnud, 2005 (ISBN 9789985791240)
- Väike äratundmiste raamat, 2006 (ISBN 9789985791660)
- Miks ma ei taha olla kirjanik?, 2008 (ISBN 9789985792384)
