= Hommikuleht =

Estonian newspaper

- Founded: 1992
- Ceased publication: 1995
- Language: Estonian

Hommikuleht (Morning Paper) was a newspaper published in Estonia between 1992 and 1995. Hommikuleht merged with the newspapers Päevaleht and Rahva Hääl to form a daily named Eesti Päevaleht, which was first published on 5 June 1995.
