= Lilli Suburg =

Estonian journalist, writer, and feminist

Lilli Suburg, circa 1865

Lilli Suburg (1 August [O.S. 20 July] 1841 in Rõusa Manor – 8 February 1923 in Valga) was an Estonian journalist, writer and feminist. In 1882, she established a private primary school for Estonian girls in Pärnu, in 1885 she moved it to Viljandi where the number of pupils expanded. In 1887–1894, she founded and began publishing the first women's magazine in Estonia, Linda. When forced to sell her journal, Suburg moved to Latvia and headed a school there until 1907.

== Early life and education ==
Caroline Suburg, known as Lilli, was born on 1 August 1841 (N.S.) on the Rőusa estate, in the Uue-Vändra township of Vändra Parish, in the Russian Empire to Eva (née Nuut) and Toomas Suburg. Soon after her birth, the family relocated to the nearby Vana-Vändra estate (et), where Toomas served as overseer and Eva worked as a cheesemaker. Through their industry, the couple were eventually able to lease the entire estate and send their daughter, who had previously been tutored by the governess of the Rõusa Manor, to a private school. From 1852 to 1859, Suburg studied at the private school operated by Marie von Ditmar in Pärnu and began studying at the city's girls' high school. Her studies were interrupted for almost a decade by health problems, which were diagnosed by a doctor in Tartu, as resulting from erysipelas. During this time, Suburg was forced to remain in bed for months at a time and read widely—works of German literature, pedagogy, and books and essays on women's issues. When she was able, she taught her younger siblings. Her parents had acquired a large woodland near Sikana, where Toomas tended cattle. He expanded the farm to a dairy-farming enterprise on the Waldburg estate and the family moved to the new homestead.

== Career ==
The illness left scarring on Suburg's face and from that time forward, she never allowed a photograph to be taken without a scarf covering the scars. In 1869, she had recovered and completed the examinations required to obtain her teaching certificate. By 1872, she had made the acquaintance of Carl Robert Jakobson, a writer and pedagogist involved in the nationalist awakening. With his encouragement, Suburg began work on a short story, Liina, which was based on her own life. The story, which evaluated the cultural clash between Estonian and Baltic-German customs, was published in 1877 and had several reprintings. The following year, again with the prompting of Jakobson, Suburg began working as the editor of the Pärnu Postimees. The paper, known for its conservatism, under Suburg's influence moved politically toward a more radical position.

In 1880, Suburg adopted Anna Wiegandt, a young orphan, which was an unorthodox move for an unmarried woman at the time. Almost simultaneously with this, the family fortunes shifted. Having lived above their means, Toomas decided to sell the cattle and retain only a small portion of the land and the gristmill. Eva and the daughters opposed the sale, but Toomas consummated the transaction and shortly thereafter, Suburg and her daughter moved to Pärnu. She made plans to establish a private girls' school there and wanted to teach Estonian pupils in their own language. Regulations in place at that time, prohibited teaching anything other than religion in Estonian, forcing Suburg to open the institution as a German-language school in 1882. To support the school, she held bazaars, gave speeches and staged performances, but the local elites were disapproving.

In 1885, Suburg was urged by supporters in Viljandi to relocate the school. She was able to rent a larger facility and attract more students. Fifty girls lived in the boarding house and overall, she increased the number of pupils by eighty percent. The increase in the number of students made the school financially secure and Suburg set about to design a unique educational system. Though she was required to teach in German, she took care to include noted Estonians, like Jakobson, Lydia Koidula, and Friedrich Reinhold Kreutzwald in the courses to help her students develop a sense of their own culture and develop independent judgment on their own sphere of learning. Within two-years, Suburg was looking to expand the curriculum, and approached authorities to allow she and her daughter to teach five years of German and two years of Russian for older girls. Their request was rejected, causing Suburg to give the management of the school over to her daughter. Wiegandt approached authorities again and was approved to continue teaching the five-grade program for another six years. During that time, in 1892, Russification replaced the German-language format.

Suburg had continued publishing while she was operating the school and attempted to obtain the necessary permits to publish a women's journal. Several works from the period include sentimental morality pieces such as Maarja and Eeva: or relation’s loyalty and love for man (Estonian: Maarja ja Eeva: ehk suguluse truudus ja armastus mehe vasta, 1881) and Leeni (1887). Finally in 1888, she secured the necessary approval to edit and publish Estonia's first women's magazine, Linda. The magazine covered a variety of women's topics, including legal rights, parenting, women's education, as well as their spiritual development. The publication also included articles by leading Estonians and translated pieces by leading feminists on women's suffrage and included news and debates of recent educational and scientific developments. The issues she discussed were radical for the times and generated mocking reviews from other media. Suburg edited the magazine until financial difficulties forced her to sell it in 1894.

In 1899, Wiegandt closed the school in Viljandi, married Jaan Lammas and the couple took Suburg to live with them in the Latvian village of Omuļi on Egerí farmstead. Mother and daughter again opened a school teaching children there until 1907, when Lammas' daughter was born. Suburg published her last short story, Linda, the people’s daughter (Estonian: Linda, rahva tütar) in 1900 and began working on her own memoirs. Though recognized as one of the first feminists of Estonia and made an honorary member of the Tartu Women’s Society in 1916, she was unable to attend the first women's congress held in Tartu in 1917.

== Death and legacy ==
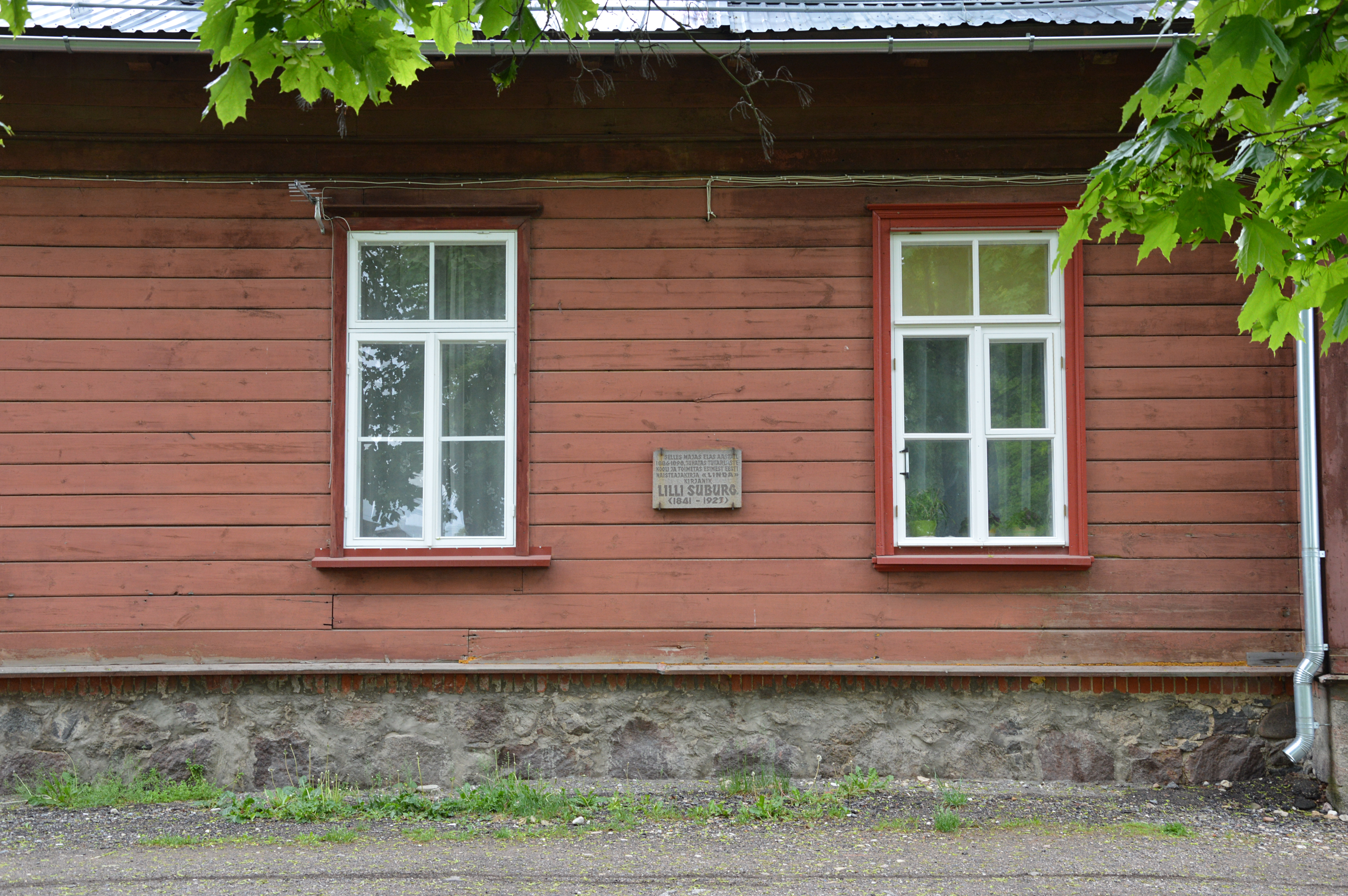
Memorial plaque in Viljandi

In her last years, Suburg would periodically travel to visit her sister Laura in Valga. During one visit, she died there on 8 February 1923. She was buried in the Old Vändra Cemetery (et) in Vändra, Estonia. The Vändra Women's Society took care of her grave and in 1926, a monument to her memory was erected by the Union of Estonian Women's Organizations (Estonian: Eesti Naisorganisatioonide Liit). In 1982, a memorial plaque was affixed to the site which had housed her school and the editorial office of Linda in Viljandi.
