= Rääbise =

Village in Estonia

- Village
- Location within Estonia
- Coordinates: 58.785°N 26.6458°E
- Country: Estonia
- County: Jõgeva County
- Parish: Jõgeva Parish
- Time zone: UTC+2 (EET)
  - Summer (DST): UTC+3 (EEST)

Rääbise (German: Repshof) is a village in Jõgeva Parish, Jõgeva County in Estonia.

== Notable people ==
Notable people that were born or lived in Rääbise include the following:

- Arnold Vihvelin (1892–1962), printmaker and painter
