= Maaleht =

Estonian newspaper

- Type: Weekly newspaper
- Owner: Eesti Ajalehed
- Editor-in-chief: Andres Eilart
- Founded: 1987
- Language: Estonian
- Circulation: 31,500 (as of February 2024)
- Website: maaleht.delfi.ee

Maaleht is the biggest weekly newspaper published in Estonia.

As of summer 2007, Maaleht was the second-largest weekly newspaper in Estonia with a circulation of nearly 50,000 copies. As of the summer of 2008, the circulation of Maaleht was 42,800, which made it the largest weekly in Estonia (Eesti Ekspress was then 40,200). At times, Eesti Ekspress's print number still exceeded Maaleht's, but unlike other publications, Maaleht managed to grow its customers' community in the following years. For example, at the end of 2014, the Maaleht print number was 43,000, which made this weekly market leader (Eesti Ekspress's piece was 29,800 in the next place).

This is Estonia's largest weekly page, with the number of subscribers of the digital and paper page in 2015 by approximately 38,000. The newspaper is published by AS Ekspress Meedia.
