= Päevaleht =

Estonian newspaper

- Type: Daily newspaper
- Founded: 1 February 1990
- Ceased publication: 4 June 1995
- Language: Estonian

Päevaleht was a daily newspaper published in Estonia from 1990 to 1995.

== History and profile ==
On 1 February 1990, the newspaper Noorte Hääl (published between 1940–1941 and 1944–1990) was renamed to Päevaleht.

The last issue was published on 4 June 1995. After that the newspapers Hommikuleht, Päevaleht and Rahva Hääl were merged to form a daily named Eesti Päevaleht.

== See also ==
- Päevaleht (1905)
- Eesti Päevaleht
