= Sädemed =

Satire magazine in Estonia (1905–1934)

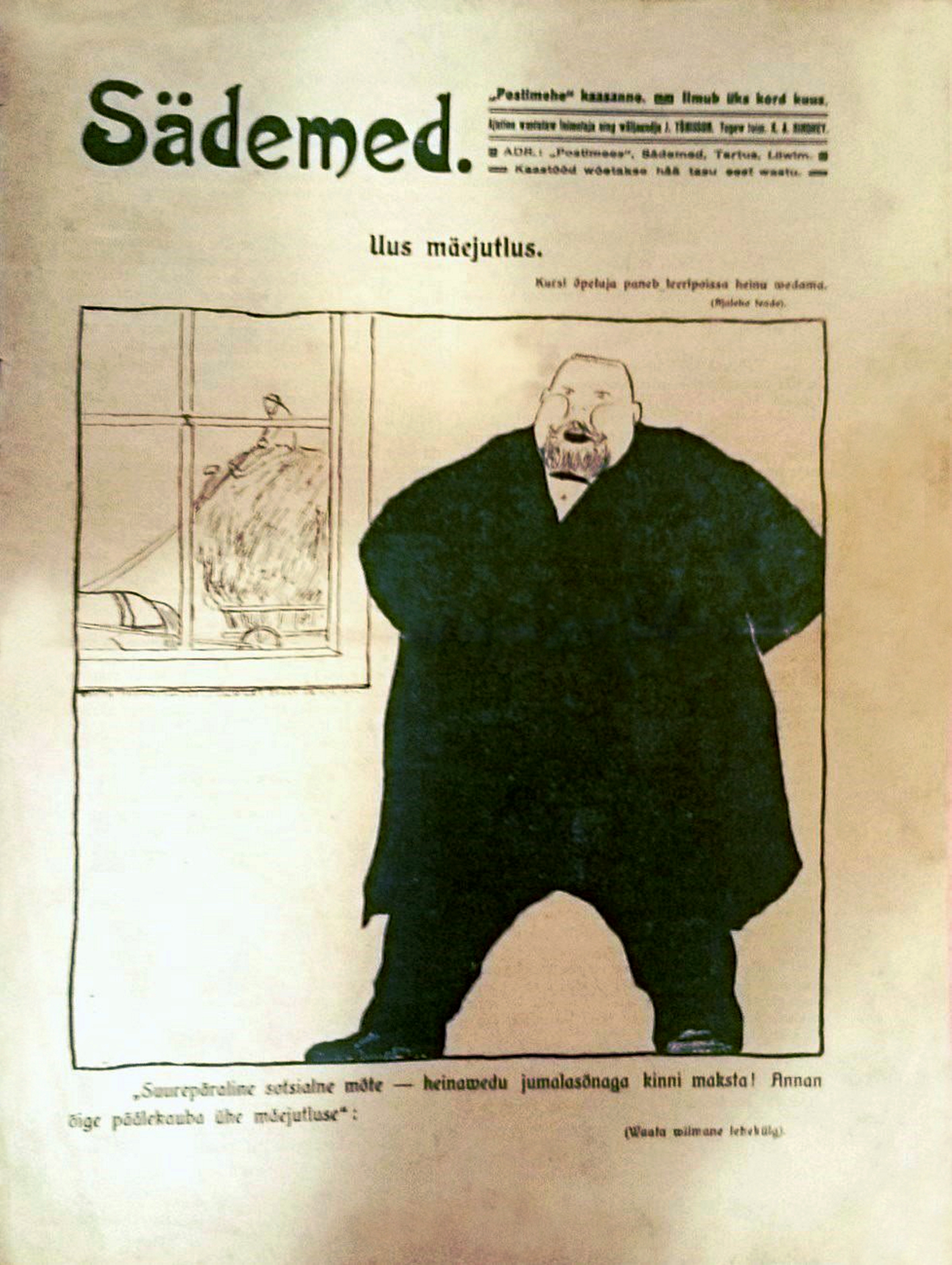
- The March 1910 front page of Sädemed featured a caricature by Otto Krusten of the clergyman Gustav Punga, who made children at a camp work with hay. The editor Jüri Tõnisson was sent to jail for this cartoon.
- Editor: Jaan Tõnisson and others
- Categories: Satirical magazine
- Founded: 1905
- Final issue: 1934
- Country: Estonia
- Based in: Tartu
- Language: Estonian

Sädemed (Sparks) was an Estonian satirical magazine published by Postimees in Tartu between 1905 and 1934.

The magazine was founded by Karl August Hindrey, and its main purpose was to mock Jaan Tõnisson's opponents. The magazine's first publisher and editor was Jaan Tõnisson. The magazine was also published as a supplement to Elu (from October 1907 to August 1908), edited by Anton Jürgenstein.

Sädemed was issued monthly from 1905 to 1915, except for June to September 1907, when it was not published. Instead, Wirmalised was published in August 1907. Sädemed did not appear from 1916 to 1922, appeared monthly from 1923 to 1924, and was issued weekly from 1925 to 1934. From 1932 to 1933, Sädemed was published as an extra page of the newspaper Maamees (1929–1935), and from 1935 to 1940 it appeared on the pages of Postimees once a week below a horizontal divider.

== Editors ==
Sädemed had several different editors through its publication history:

- Jaan Tõnisson: 1905–1906
- Jüri Tõnisson: 1906–1907
- Jaan Karu: 1908–1915, 1915–1918, 1919–1921
- Artur Paulmeister: 1914–1915
- Leonhard Wilhelm Johann Neuman: 1915
- Johan Viik: 1918–1919
- Jüri Eltermann: 1921–1923
- Hugo Kuusner: 1924–1928
- Anton Jürgenstein: 1925–1927
- Yri Naelapea: 1925–1927
- Hugo Villi Kukke: 1928–1930
- Richard Janno: 1929–1931

== Contributors ==
The following persons contributed to Sädemed:

- Hendrik Adamson
- Artur Adson
- Vello Agori (Gori), caricaturist
- Marta Bekker
- Aleksander Blaubrück caricaturist
- A. Feldmann, photo correspondent
- August Gailit
- Otto Grossschmidt
- Oskar Gustavson
- Karl August Hindrey, caricaturist and managing editor (1905–1915, 1923)
- Viktor Holst
- E. Jäger
- Aleksander Jõeäär
- Ervin Kade
- Juhan Kangilaski, caricaturist
- Friedrich Kõlli
- Hanno Kompus
- Jaan Koort, illustrator
- Bernhard Krug
- Otto Krusten, caricaturist and editor (1923)
- Pedro Krusten
- Eerik Laidsaar
- Heino Lehepuu, cover illustrator (1930 nos. 9, 15, 1931 no. 1)
- Juhan Mägi
- Oskar Mänd
- Kusta Mannermaa
- Eduard Männik
- Mait Metsanurk
- Gustav Mootse
- Herman Niggol
- Herbert Normann
- Erik Obermann, caricaturist
- Jaan Oks
- Jüri Parijõgi
- Karl Parts, publisher
- Marje Pedajas
- Arno Raag
- Hugo Raudsepp
- Karl Reitav
- Karl Eduard Sööt
- Gustav Suits
- Edur Tasa
- Romulus Tiitus, caricaturist, illustrator, and editor (1927 no. 47 – 1931)
- Terje Tõeveer
- August Toomingas
- Hugo Tsahkna, caricaturist
- Enn Tuuling
- Helmut Valtman
- Harald Vellner
- Arnold Vihvelin, caricaturist (1920 no. 33)
- Henrik Visnapuu
