= Päevaleht (1905) =

Estonian newspaper

- Type: Daily newspaper
- Founded: 16 December 1905
- Ceased publication: 26 July 1940
- Language: Estonian

Päevaleht was a newspaper published from 1905 until 1940 in Estonia.

== History and profile ==
The first issue of Päevaleht was published on 16 December 1905 in Tallinn. In 1924, they expanded to a new building.

Following the Soviet occupation, the newspaper was replaced by Noorte Hääl (published 1940–1941 and 1944–1990) in 1940. The last regular issue was printed on 26 July 1940. During the German occupation of Estonia in World War II, a revival of the old newspaper was attempted, but only a single issue was able to appear on 29 August 1941.

On 1 February 1990, the newspaper Noorte Hääl became Päevaleht once again.

The paper has been digitized by the National Library of Estonia.

== See also ==
- Päevaleht
- Eesti Päevaleht
