= Wirmalised =

Satire magazine in Estonia (1905–1934)

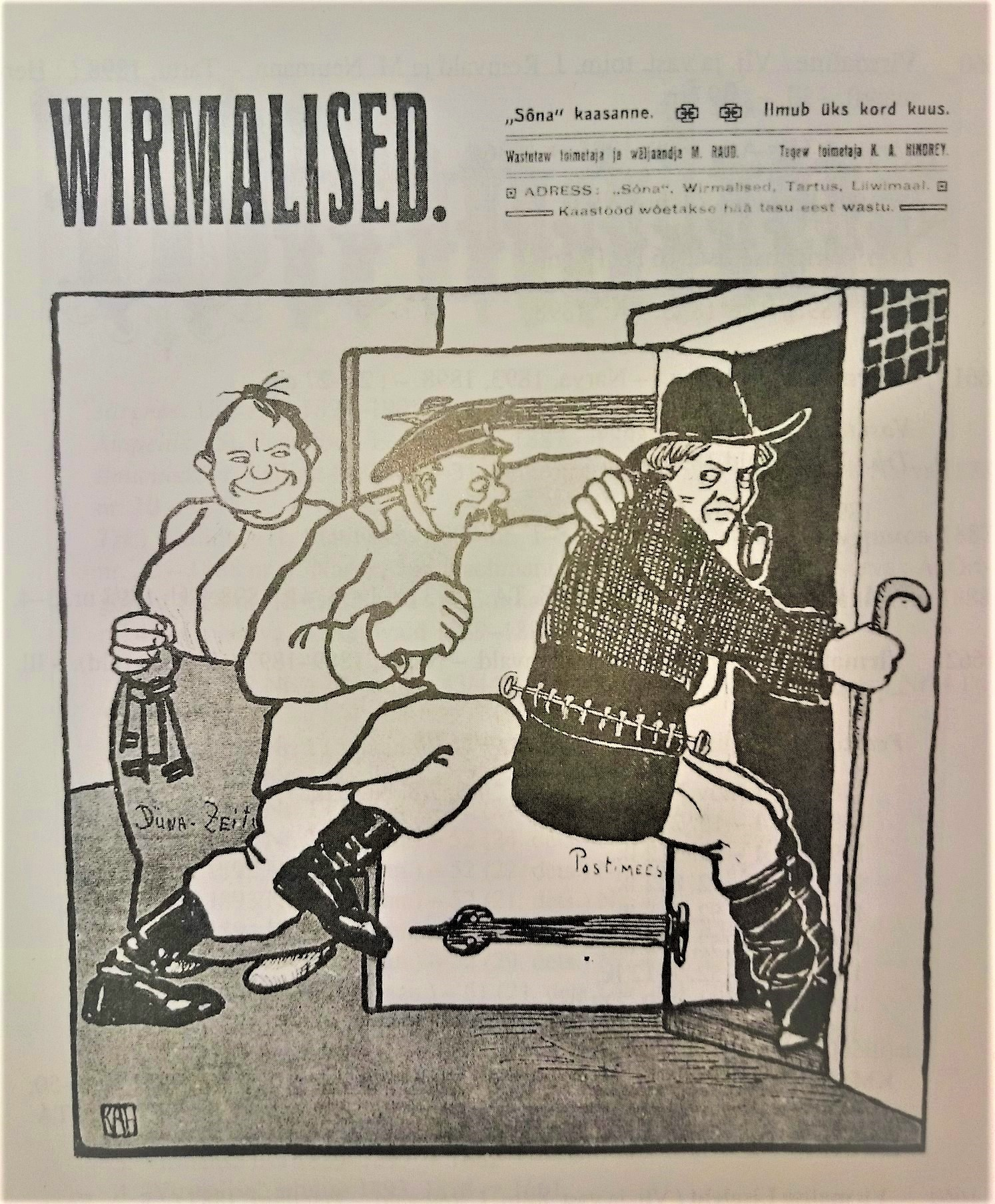
- Caricature of Karl August Hindrey on the cover of Wirmalised, 1907
- Editor: Karl August Hindrey
- Categories: Satirical magazine
- Founded: 1907
- Final issue: 1907
- Country: Estonia
- Based in: Tartu
- Language: Estonian

Wirmalised (or Virmalised, 'Northern Lights') was a humor and satirical magazine that was published in Tartu in August 1907.

The magazine was limited to only one issue. This publication simultaneously appeared both in the special edition of the newspaper Postimees called Elu and as a supplement to the newspaper Sõna.

Wirmalised filled the gap left by the magazine Sädemed, which was not published from June to September 1907. The front cover of the magazine featured a caricature of Karl August Hindrey, and it contained eight pages. The editor of the magazine was Karl August Hindrey, and its publisher was Mart Raud.

The magazine was printed at the Postimees printing house in Tartu.
