= St George's Church, Tartu =

Church building in Tartu, Estonia

St George's Church
- Юрьевский собор
- Tartu Püha Jüri kirik
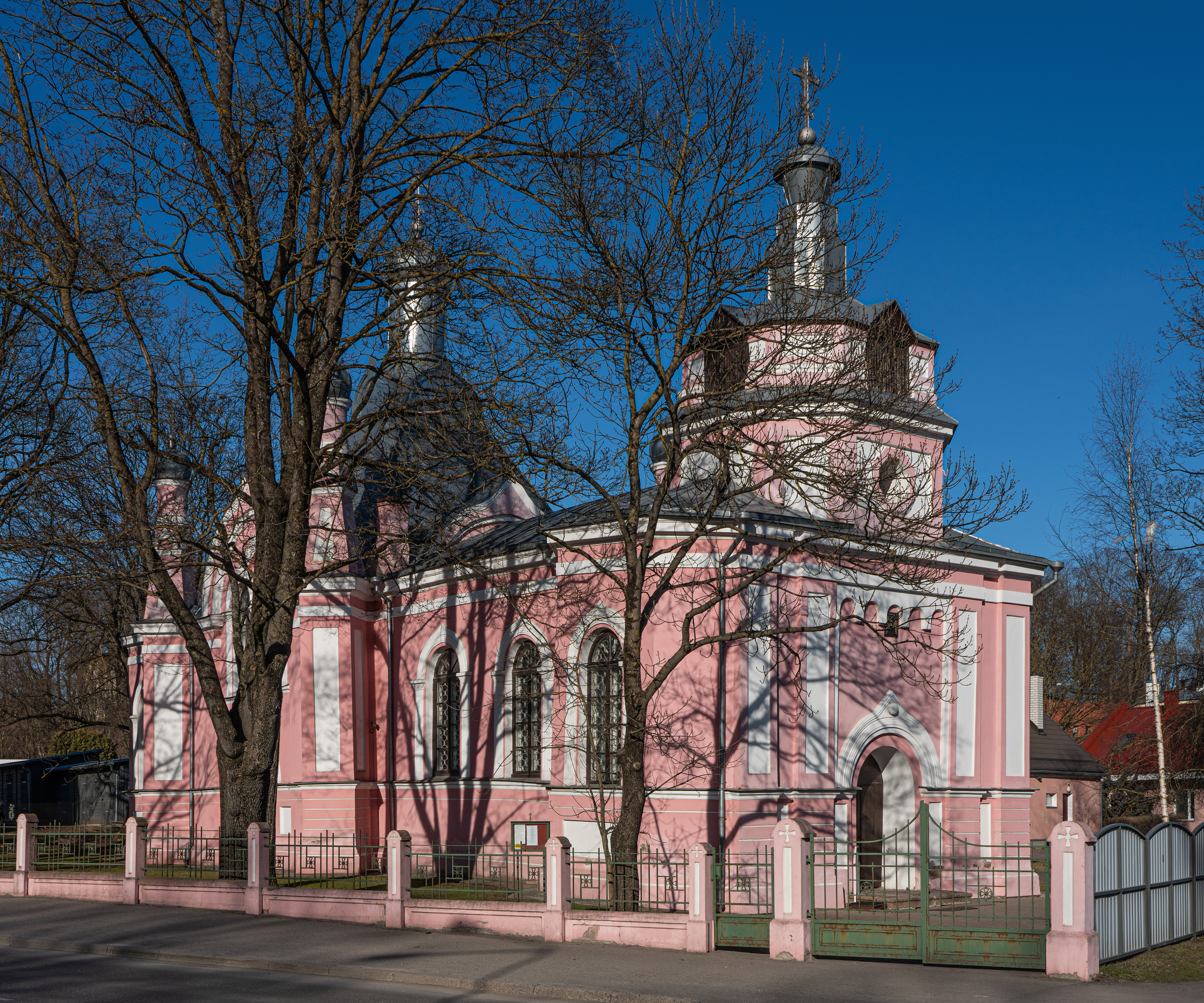
- St George's Church
- 58.387143°N 26.727301°E
- Location: Tartu
- Country: Estonia
- Denomination: Estonian Orthodox Church of the Moscow Patriarchate

History
- Status: Parish church
- Dedication: Saint George
- Consecrated: 2 September 1870

Architecture
- Functional status: Active
- Style: Russian architecture
- Years built: 1868-1870
- Completed: 1870

St George's Church (Estonian: Tartu Püha Jüri kirik, Russian: Юрьевский собор) is a church of the Estonian Orthodox Church of the Moscow Patriarchate in Tartu, Estonia.

== History ==
The congregation of St George was founded in 1845 and the church was completed in 1870 through the initiatives of the parish priest Joosep Shestakovski. It was built in the Russian architecture typical of churches in Russia. The building was damaged in World War II, however it was restored in 1945. Patriarch Alexius II of Moscow served as priest in this church after graduating from the Leningrad Theological Academy.
