= Eesti Ajalehed =

Company based in Estonia

AS Eesti Ajalehed
- Industry: Publishing
- Website: www.lehed.ee

Eesti Ajalehed (English: Estonian Newspapers) was an Estonian publishing company, which published the newspapers Maaleht and Eesti Ekspress. The company belonged to the Tallinn Stock Exchange. The company operated in Tallinn. In 2015, Ekspress Grupp merged its subsidiaries AS Eesti Ajalehed and AS Delfi into one company, which was named AS Ekspress Meedia.
