= Linda (Estonian magazine) =

Literary women's magazine in Estonia (1887–1905)

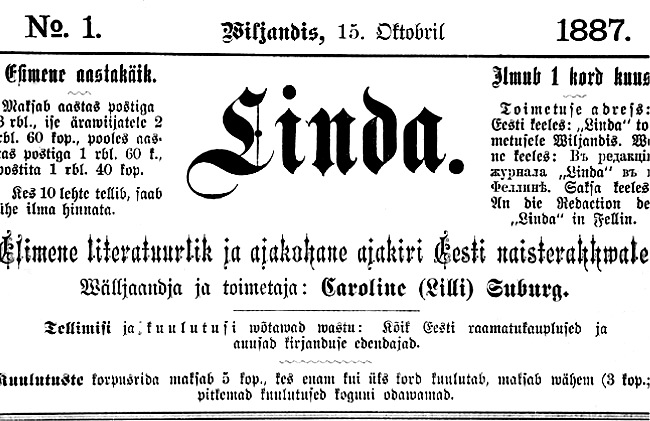
- Editor-in-chief: Lilli Suburg (1887–1894)
- Categories: Literary women's magazine; Feminist magazine
- Frequency: Weekly
- Founder: Lilli Suburg
- Founded: 1887
- First issue: October 1887
- Final issue: 1905
- Country: Estonia
- Based in: Viljandi
- Language: Estonian

Linda was a feminist literary magazine published between 1887 and 1905. It was the first women's magazine in Estonia, as reflected in its subtitle: Esimene literatuurlik ja ajakohane ajakiri Eesti naisterahvale (The First Literary and Modern Magazine for Estonian Women).

== History and profile ==
Linda was founded by the Estonian journalist, pedagogue, and feminist Lilli Suburg in 1887 to make Estonian women aware of the ideas of feminism. The first issue appeared on October that year. She also edited the magazine until 1893 and for a short period in 1894. Linda was based in Viljandi. In 1891 the magazine became a regular weekly publication.

It featured articles on relationships, domestic activities, and emancipation of women. The magazine also offered translated fiction, literary criticism, and original works mostly written by Suburg in addition to biographies of Estonian writers. In 1894 Suburg was forced to sell Linda, which continued to be published by Anton Jürgenstein until 1905.

All issues of the magazine have been digitized by the National Library of Estonia.
