= Tuuslar (1928 magazine) =

Magazine in Estonia (1928)

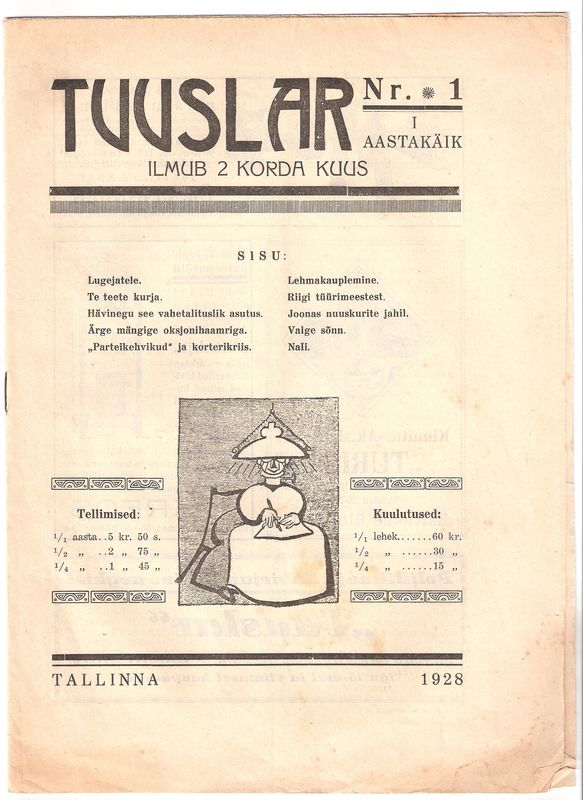
- Front cover of Tuuslar (1928)
- Editor: Jaan Ratassepp
- Publisher: Jaan Ratassepp
- Founded: 1928
- First issue: 1928
- Final issue: 1928
- Country: Estonia
- Based in: Tallinn
- Language: Estonian

Tuuslar (Sorcerer) was an Estonian magazine that was published in December 1928 in Tallinn.

The publisher and editor was Jaan Ratassepp (1886–1947). The magazine contained 16 pages, and it was printed at Jaan Zimmermann's printing house in Tallinn. It was registered for publication twice a month, but only one issue appeared.
