= August Roosileht =

Estonian graphic artist

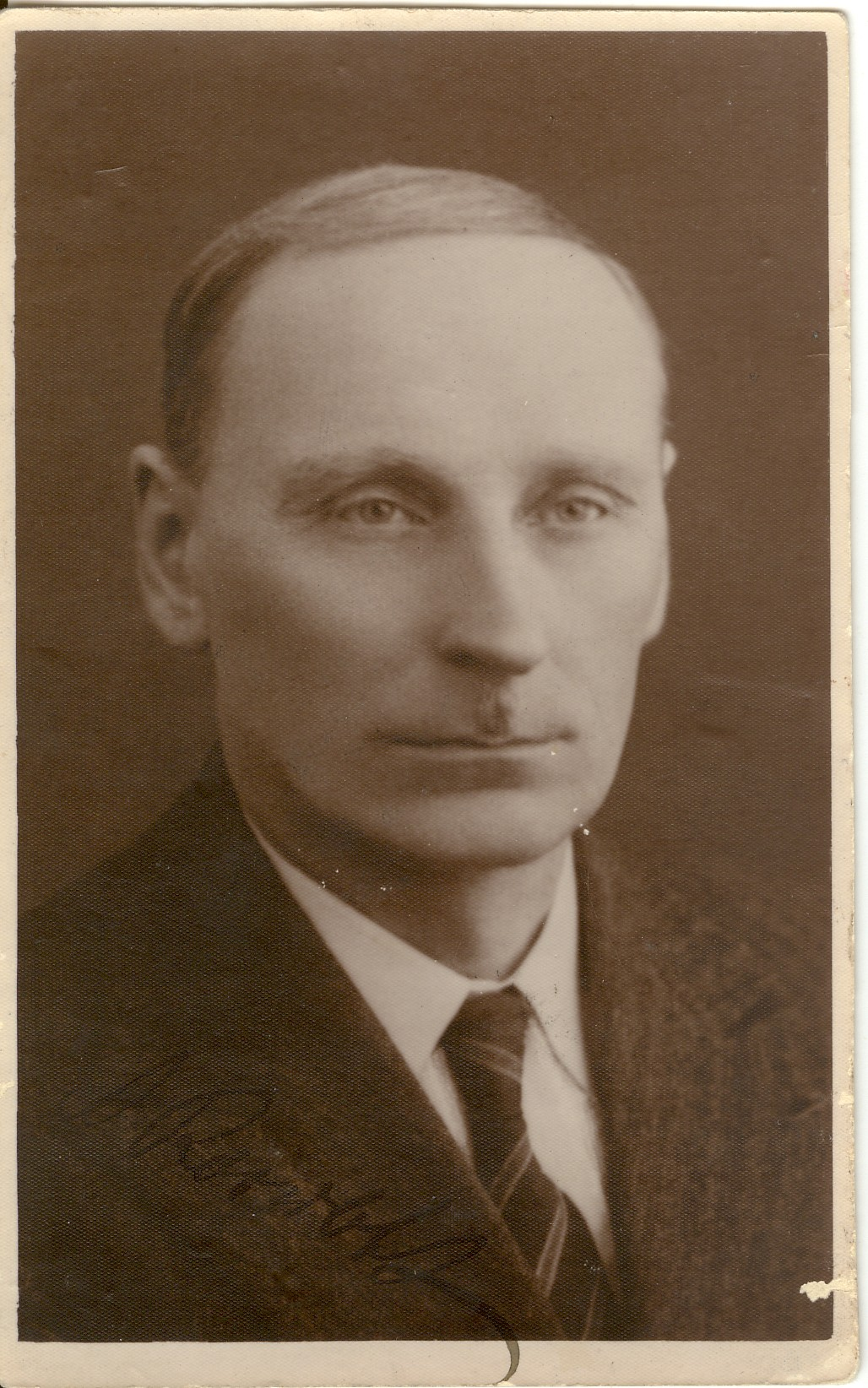
August Roosileht

August Roosileht (26 February 1887 in Einmani Parish, Järva County – 8 (or 9) August 1941 in Paide) was an Estonian graphic artist.

From 1906 to 1907 he studied at Saint Petersburg Stieglitz State Academy of Art and Design. From 1908 to 1910 at München, and from 1910 to 1912 again at St. Petersburg. Since 1919 he taught at Paide.

In 1909 he participated in the first time at a group exhibition in Tartu.

He was a member of the Estonian Artists' Union.

== Gallery ==
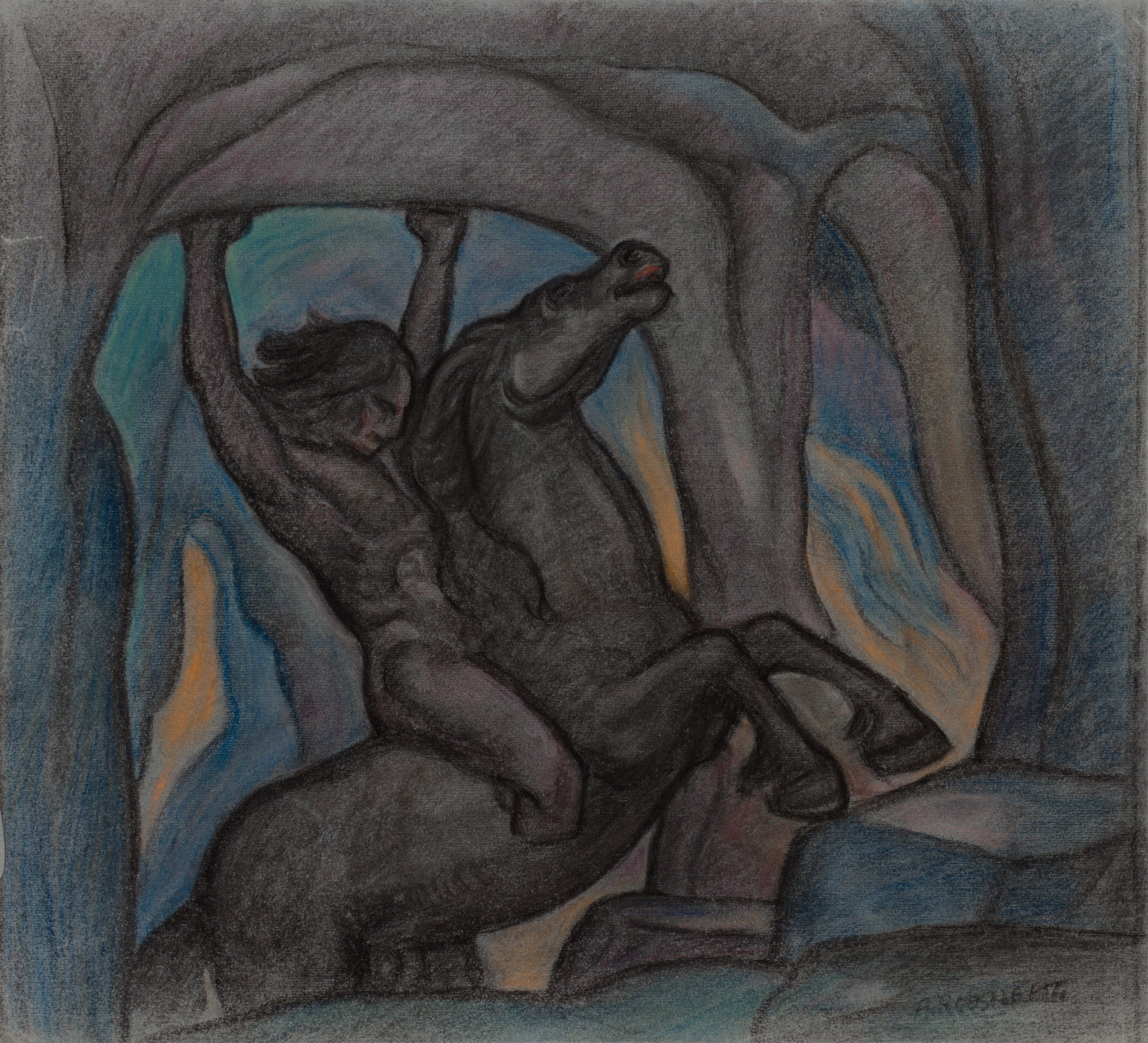
"Kalevipoeg Põrgu väravas"

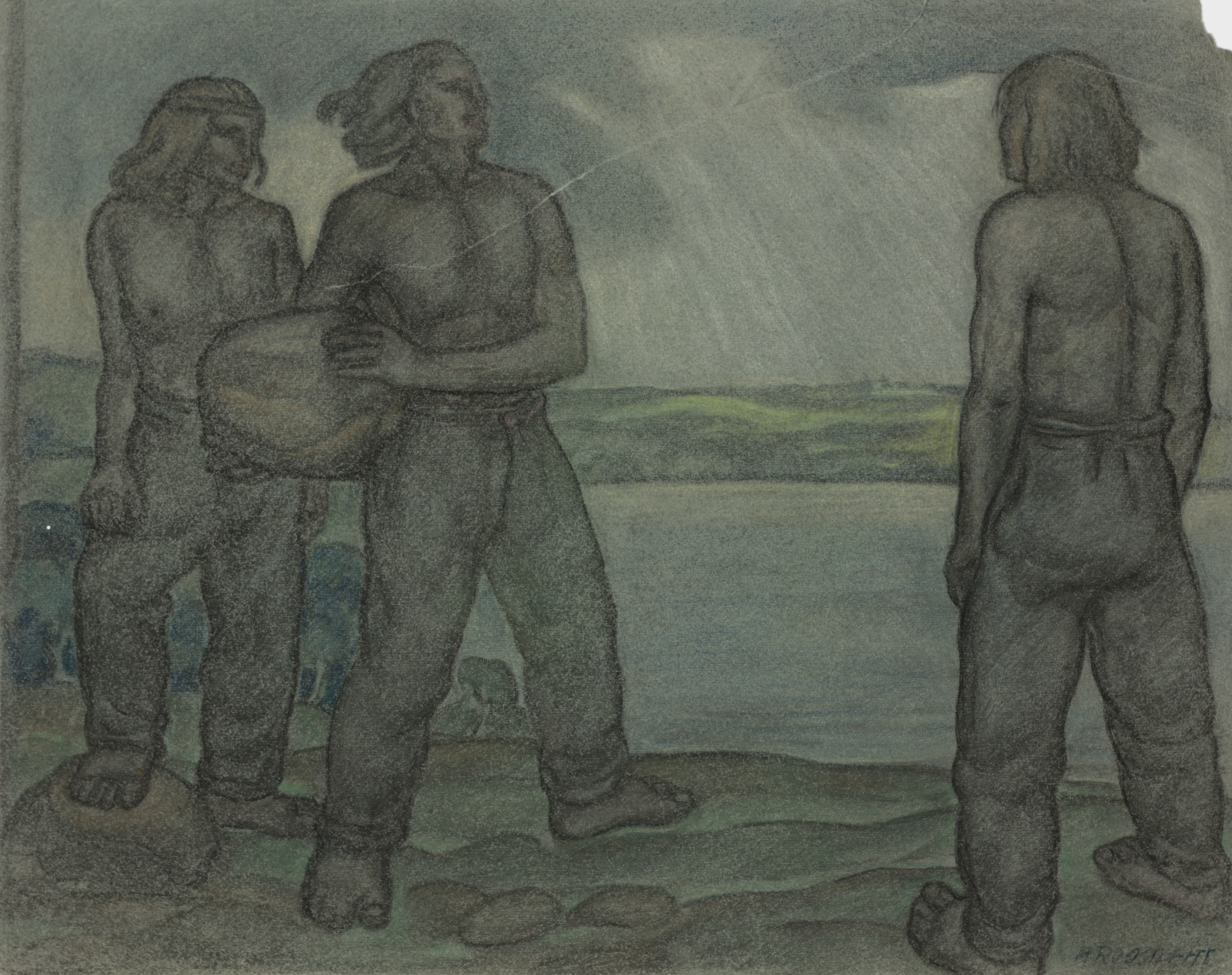
"Kalevipoeg kivi viskamas"

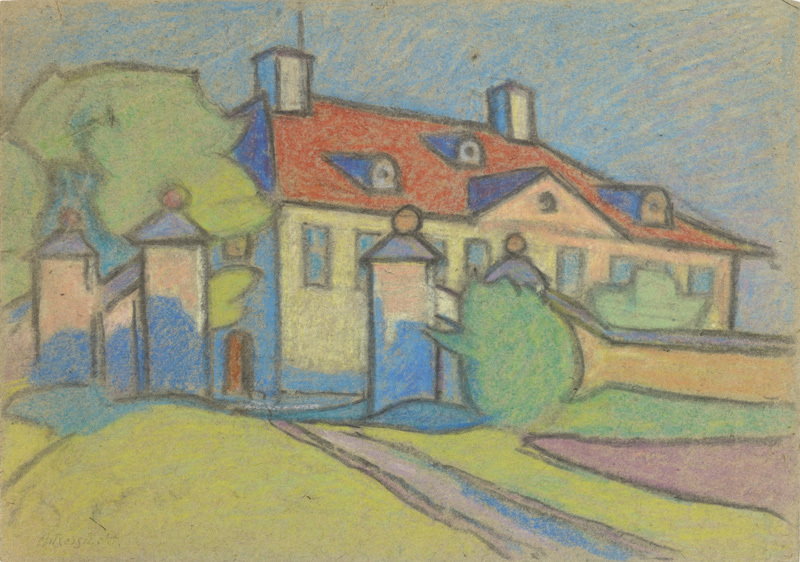
"Mõis"
