= Anton Jürgenstein =

Estonian politician (1861–1933)

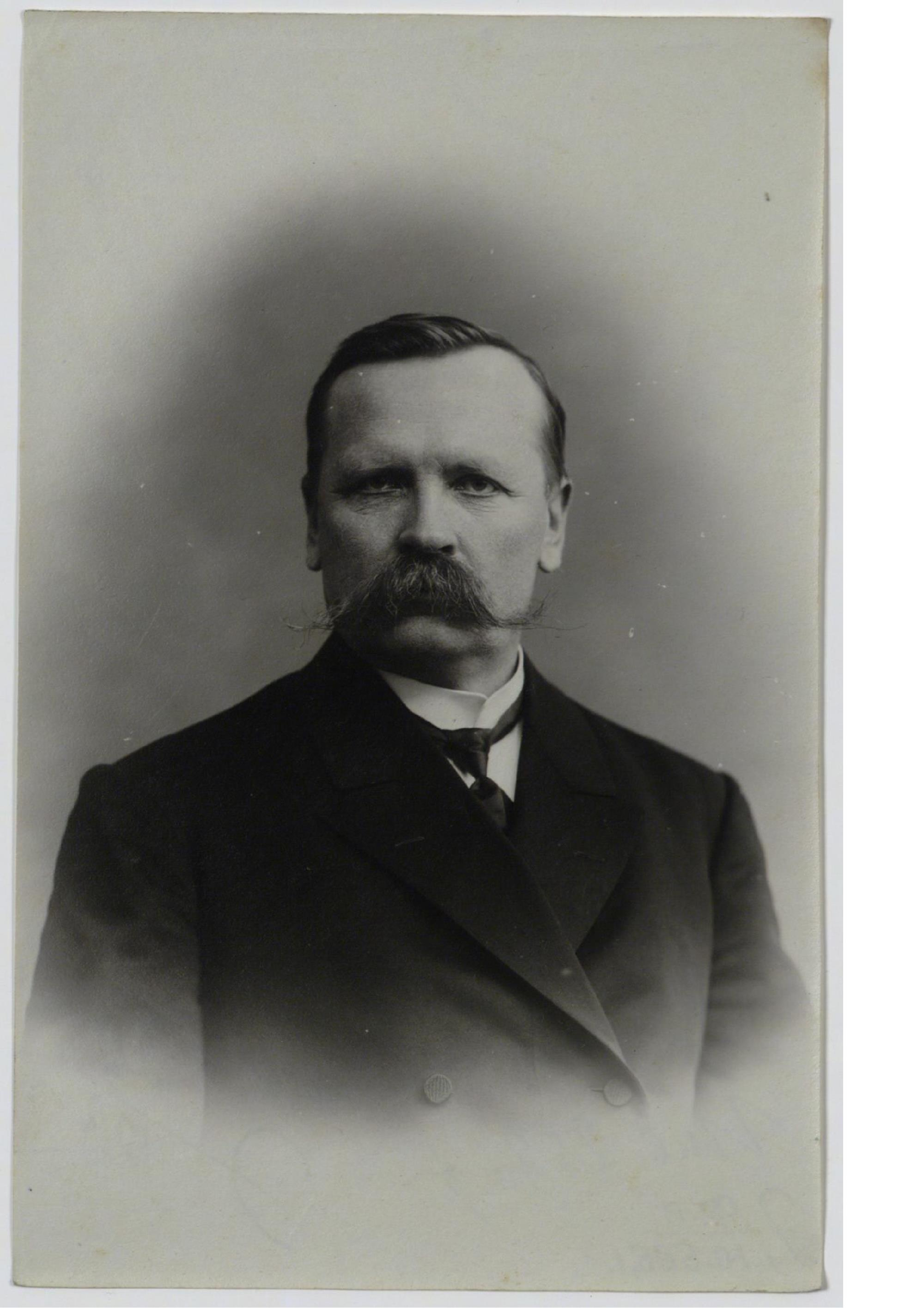
Anton Tõnis Jürgenstein

Anton Tõnis Jürgenstein (1 November 1861 Vana-Vändra Parish (now Põhja-Pärnumaa Parish), Kreis Pernau – 21 February 1933 Tartu) was an Estonian critic, journalist and politician. He was a member of parliament (I Riigikogu, 2nd State Duma).
