= Tuuslar (1922 magazine) =

Humor magazine in Estonia (1922)

- Categories: Humor magazine
- Founded: 1922
- First issue: 1922
- Final issue: 1922
- Country: Estonia
- Based in: Tallinn
- Language: Estonian

Tuuslar: kirjandus-kunst-pilge (Sorcerer: Literature–Art–Satire) was an Estonian humor magazine that was published in December 1922 in Tallinn.

Material was contributed to the magazine by Konstantin Osvet, and the front cover and illustrations were drawn by Arnold Vihvelin and Gustav Mootse. The magazine was printed at the Täht printing house in Tallinn. The price was 30 marks. Only two issues were published in total.
