= Karl August Hindrey =

Estonian writer, journalist and cartoonist

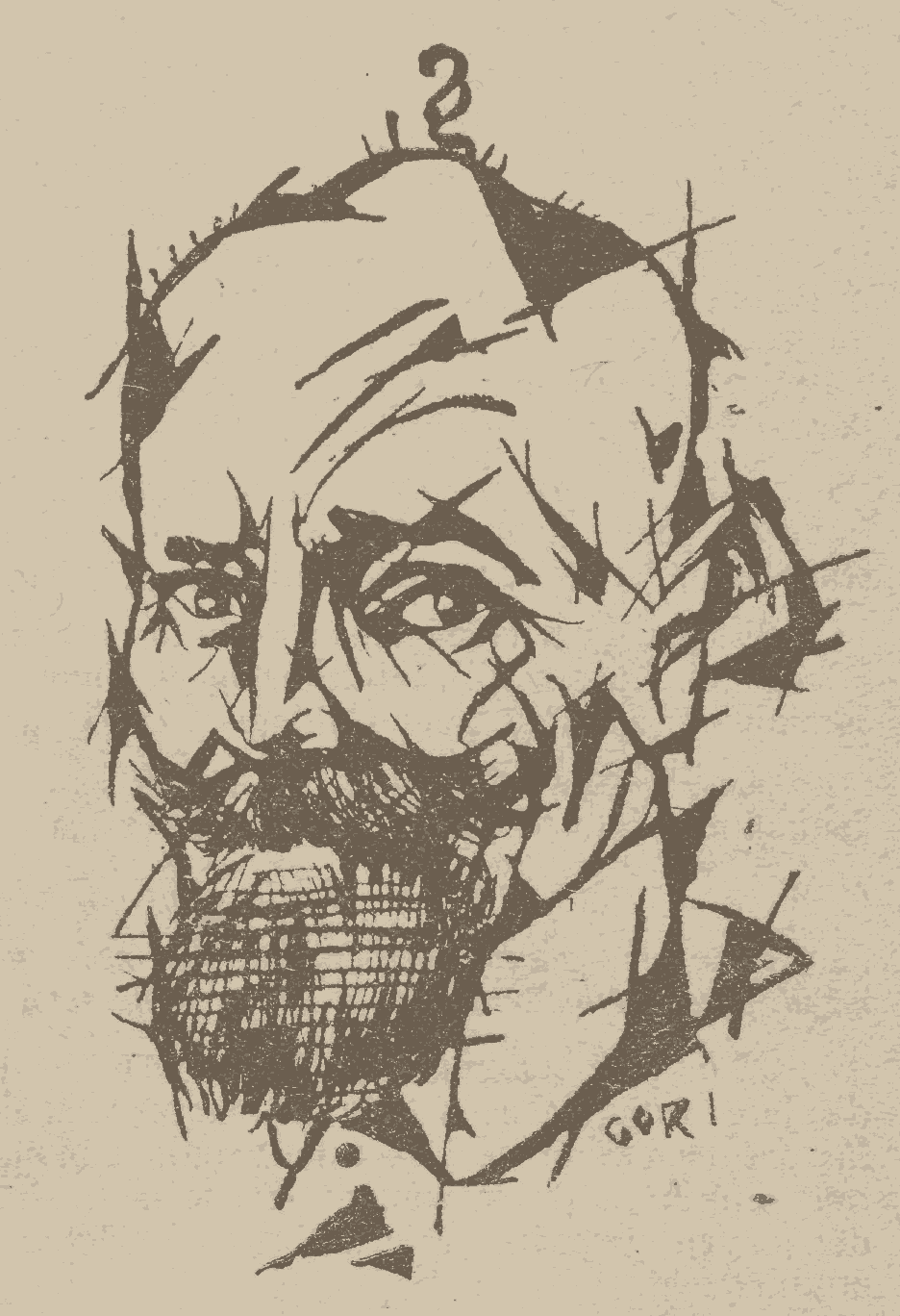
Karl August Hindrey in 1920

Karl August Hindrey (15 August 1875 Abja Manor, Kreis Pernau – 9 January 1947) was an Estonian writer, journalist and cartoonist. He is mostly known through his psychological short stories and historical novels. He is also considered to be the founder of Estonian comics.

From 1904, he worked in the editorial offices of the newspapers Postimees and Päevaleht. He used the pseudonym Hoia Ronk, when he made contributions to the two newspapers mentioned above. He established two satirical magazines: Sädemed and Kratt.

During the Second World War, his activities were anti-Soviet. He was also one of the Forest Brothers.

He died in 1947. He is buried in Metsakalmistu Cemetery.

== Works ==
- 1906: comic book "Piripilli-Liisu" ('Betty Crybaby')
- 1918: comic book "Lõhkiläinud Kolumats" ('Burst Kolumats the Bogeyman')
- 1929: memoirs "Minu elukroonika" ('The chronicle of my life', 3 volumes)
- 1937: novel "Sigtuna häving" ('The Destruction of Sigtuna')
