= Noorte Hääl =

Estonian newspaper

- Type: Daily newspaper
- Owner: Eestimaa Leninlik Kommunistlik Noorsooühing
- Founded: 1940
- Ceased publication: 1995
- Language: Estonian
- OCLC number: 26048215

Noorte Hääl (meaning Voice of Youth in English) was a daily newspaper published in Estonia between 1940 and 1995.

== History ==
Before the restoration of independence of Estonia, Noorte Hääl was owned by the Estonian branch of the Komsomol, the Leninist Young Communist League of Estonia.

On 1 February 1990, Noorte Hääl was renamed Päevaleht, which ceased publication in 1995.
