= Rahva Hääl =

Estonian daily newspaper

- Type: Periodical
- Format: A2
- Founded: 1940
- Ceased publication: 1995
- Language: Estonian

Rahva Hääl cover page, August 15, 1940. The headline says: "The dearest wishes of the Estonian people have been fulfilled."

Rahva Hääl (lit. The People's Voice) was the official daily newspaper of the Communist Party of Estonia during the Estonian Soviet Socialist Republic. It was founded shortly after the first Soviet takeover in 1940 based on the offices and resources of Uus Eesti (New Estonia), an earlier Estonian newspaper.

The last issue of Uus Eesti was published on June 21, 1940. The first issue of Rahva Hääl was put together by the old editors under the leadership of new editors, and the paper was published on June 22, 1940.

== See also ==
- Eastern Bloc media and propaganda
