= Suurupi Peninsula =

Peninsula in Estonia

Coordinates: 59.453°N 24.402°E

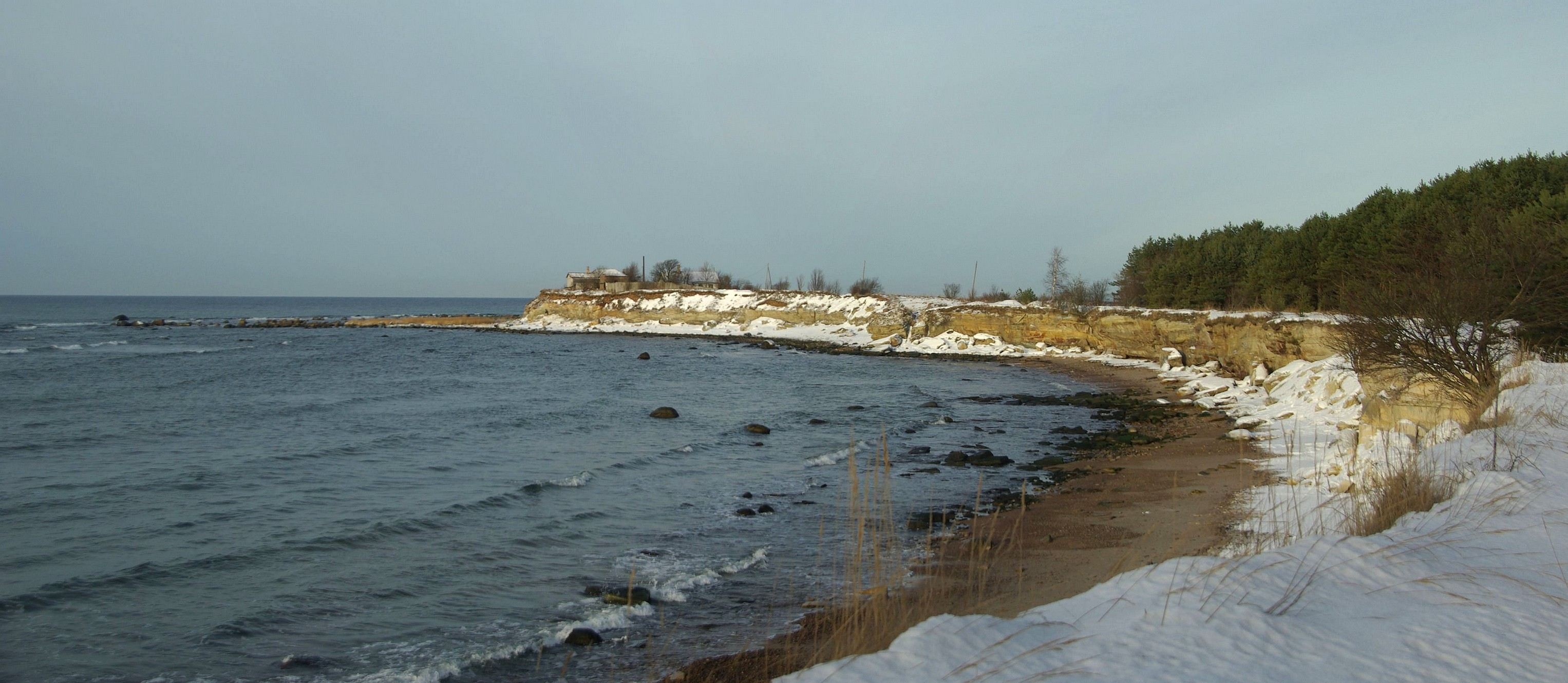
Cape Ninamaa on the peninsula

The Suurupi Peninsula (Estonian: Suurupi poolsaar) is a peninsula in Harju County, Estonia.

Locations on the peninsula: Cape Ninamaa.

Several villages are located on the peninsula: Muraste, Suurupi, and Viti.

Part of the peninsula is under protection (Muraste Nature Reserve).
