= Suurupi Nature Reserve =

Protected area in Estonia

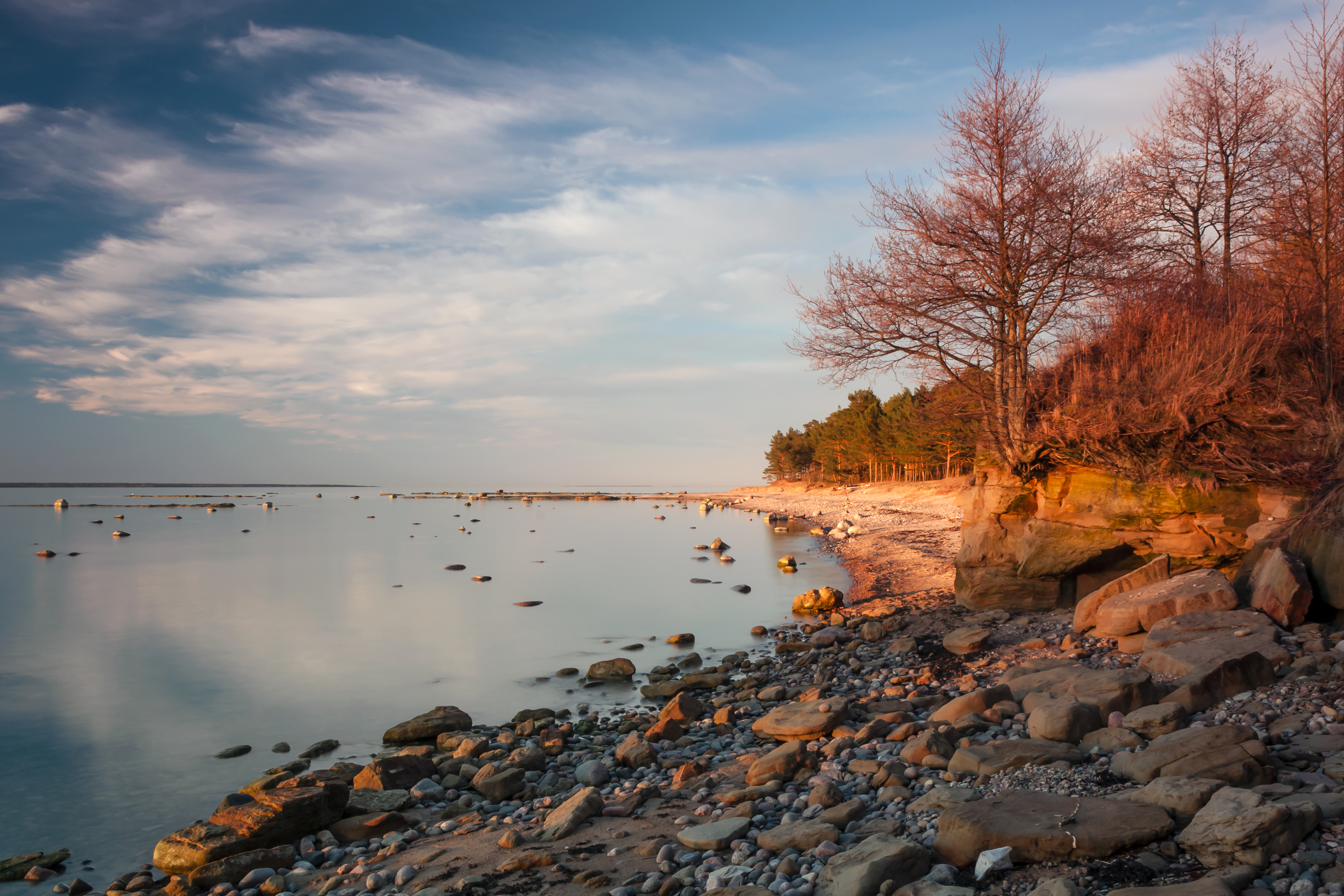

- Location within Estonia
- Location: Estonia
- Nearest city: Suurupi
- Coordinates: 59°27′30″N 24°21′30″E
- Area: 192 ha (470 acres)
- Established: 2009

Suurupi Nature Reserve is a nature reserve which is located in Harju County, Estonia.

The area of the nature reserve is 192 ha.

The protected area was founded in 2009 to protect valuable habitat types and threatened species in Suurupi and Vääna-Jõesuu village (both in Harku Parish).
