= Vahi =

Vahi (or Vähi) may refer to:

== Places ==
- Vahi, Tartu County, small borough in Tartu Parish, Tartu County, Estonia
- Vahi, Tartu County (village), village in Tartu Parish, Tartu County, Estonia
- Vahi, Harju County, village in Harku Parish, Harju County, Estonia
- Virginia Highland, neighborhood of Atlanta, Georgia, United States

== People ==
- Kristina Vähi (born 1973), Estonian operatic soprano
- Peeter Vähi (born 1955), Estonian composer
- Tiit Vähi (born 1947), Estonian businessman and politician
- Kristina Šmigun-Vähi (born 1977), Estonian cross-country skier

== Other ==
- Vahi-vero, a character in Tuamotu mythology
- A Kanohi mask from the LEGO Bionicle series
- VaHi for Virginia–Highland, neighborhood of Atlanta, Georgia, United States
