= Krusten =

Krusten is an Estonian surname. Notable people with the surname include:

- Erni Krusten (1900–1984), Estonian writer
- Otto Krusten (1888–1937), Estonian caricaturist
