= Mereküla =

Mereküla, Meriküla, or variations may refer to several places in Estonia:

- Mereküla, Pärnu County, village in Häädemeeste Parish, Pärnu County
- Meriküla, Harju County, village in Harku Parish, Harju County
- Meriküla, Ida-Viru County, village in Narva-Jõesuu, Ida-Viru County
- Merekülä, village in Setomaa Parish, Võru County
