= Erni Krusten =

Estonian writer (1900–1984)

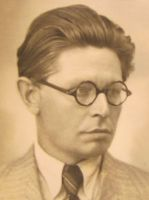
- Died: June 16, 1984 (aged 84)

Erni Krusten (30 April 1900 – 16 June 1984) was an Estonian writer. He was born Ernst Krustein in Muraste, Harku Parish, in a gardening family, and he worked as a gardener himself. He was the brother of the writer Pedro Krusten and caricaturist Otto Krusten, and the father of the literary scholar Reet Krusten.

In 1920 he began to pursue writing, and his first book was published in 1927. He wrote prolifically, and he often favored writing short works in prose.

He died 1984 in Tallinn.

== Writings ==
=== Novels ===
- "Mineviku jahil" (1929)
- "Org Mägedi armastus" (1939)
- "Pekside raamat" (1946)
- "Nagu piisake meres" (1962)

=== Short prose collections ===
- "Kanarbik" (1972)
- "Pime armastus" (1941)
- "Rahu nimel" (1951)
- "Piitsa matused" (1957)
- "Õnnetu armastus" (1957)
- "Kevadet otsimas" (1960)
- "Viis lugu" (1968)
- "Rõõmunäljane" (1973)
- "Vurriluu" (1980)
- "Hull pääsuke" (1981)
- "Metalliotsija" (1984)

=== Poetry ===
- "Peegel tänaval" (1978)

=== Stories ===
- "Vana võrukael" (1966)
- "Väga halb hinne" (1967)
- "Okupatsioon" (1969)
