= Harkujärve =

Village in Estonia

- Village
- Location in Estonia
- Coordinates: 59°24′59″N 24°36′12″E
- Country: Estonia
- County: Harju County
- Municipality: Harku Parish

Population (01.06.2010)
  - Total: 564

Harkujärve (German: Harkojärw) is a village in Harku Parish, Harju County in northern Estonia. It has a population of 766 (as of 1 December 2019). The village is located on the western and southwestern side of Lake Harku.
