= Vääna (river) =

River in Estonia

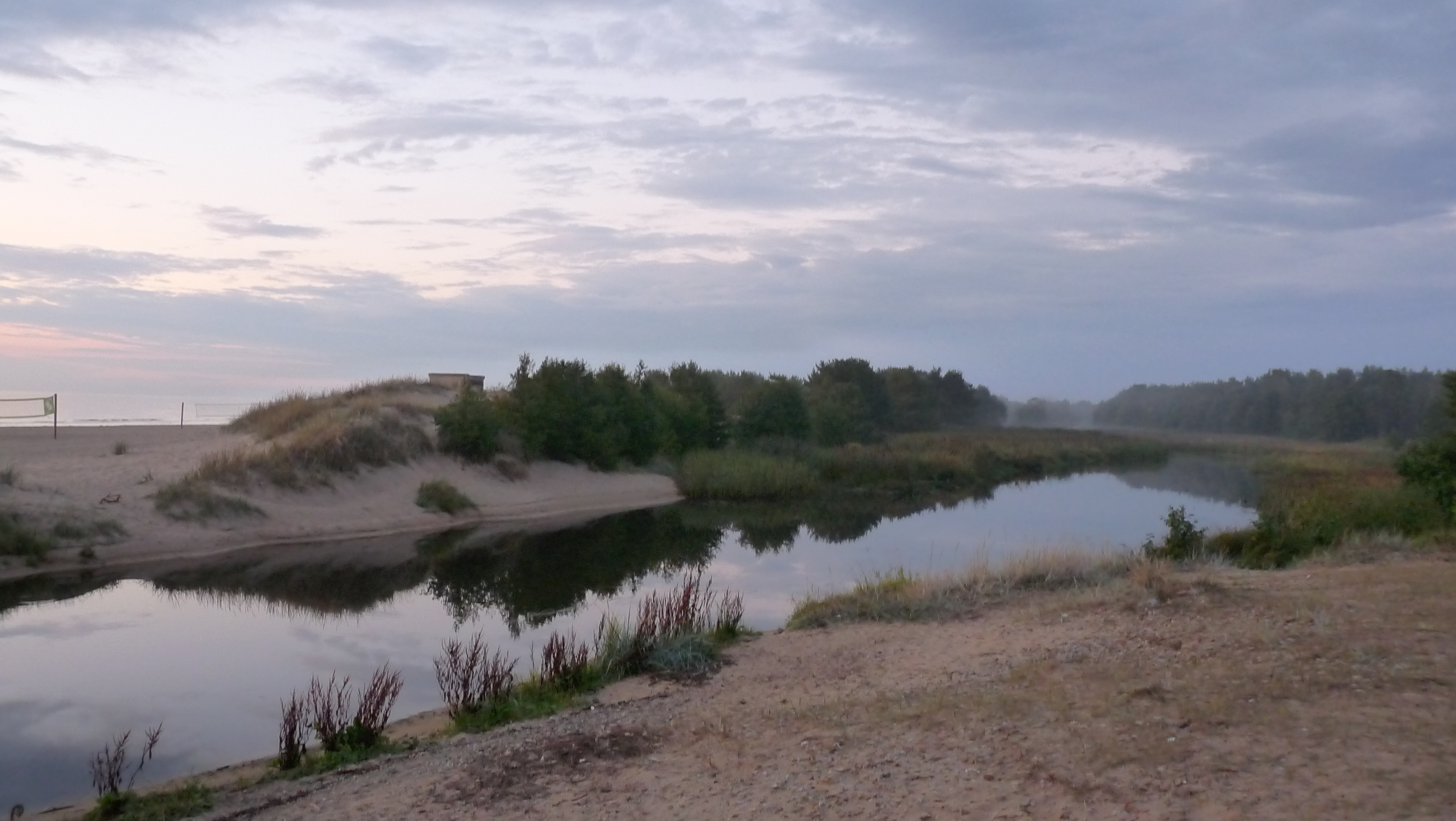
- Vääna, mouth in Vääna-Jõesuu

- Location in Estonia

Location
- Country: Estonia
- Län: Harju County

Physical characteristics
- Mouth: Lohusalu Bay
- Length: 64 km (40 mi)

The Vääna (Estonian: Vääna jõgi) is a river in northwestern Estonia. It is located in Harju County, 23 kilometres (14 mi) west of the capital Tallinn. Its mouth is in Vääna-Jõesuu, Harku Parish. The length of the river is 69.5 km.

== Gallery ==
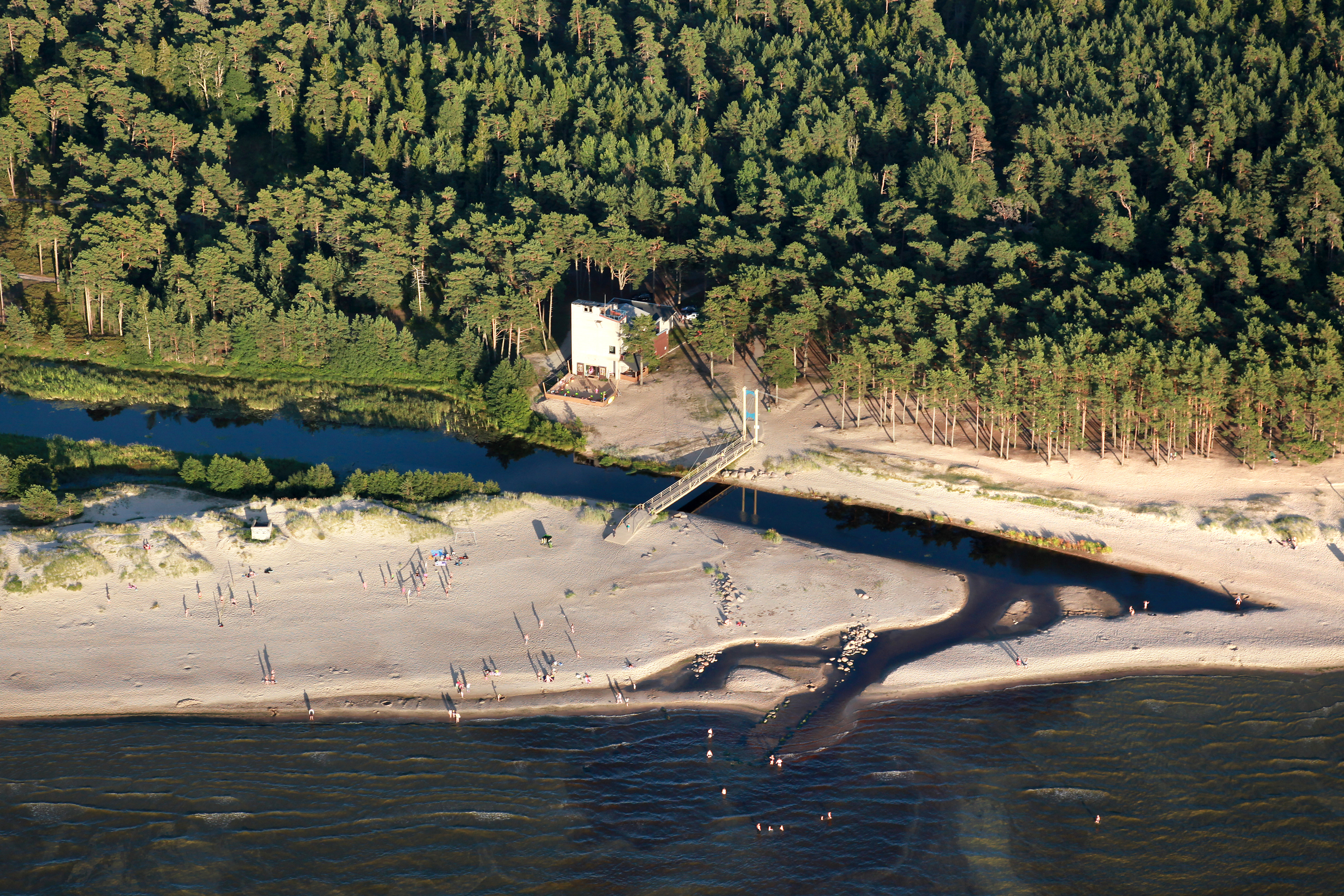

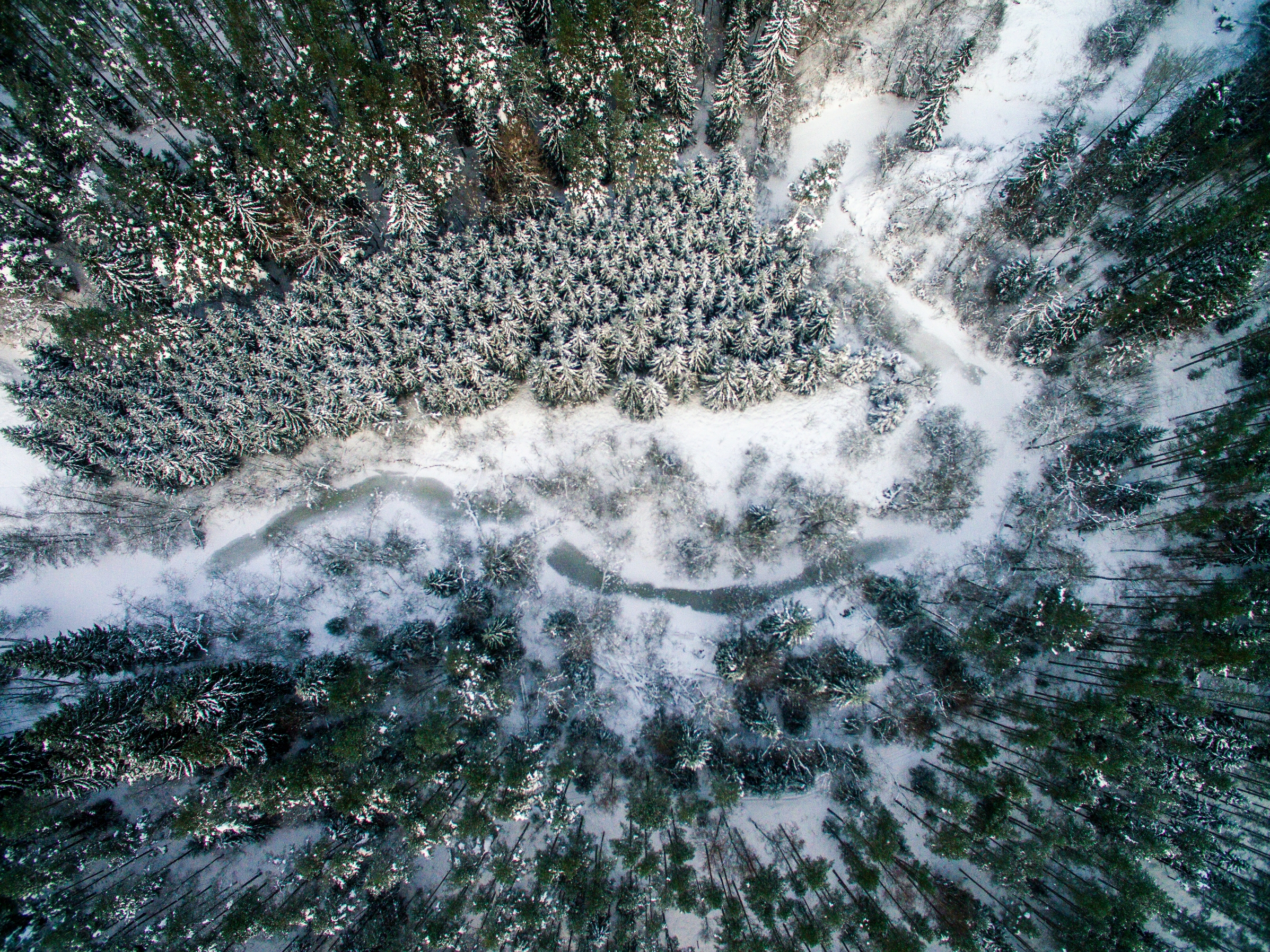

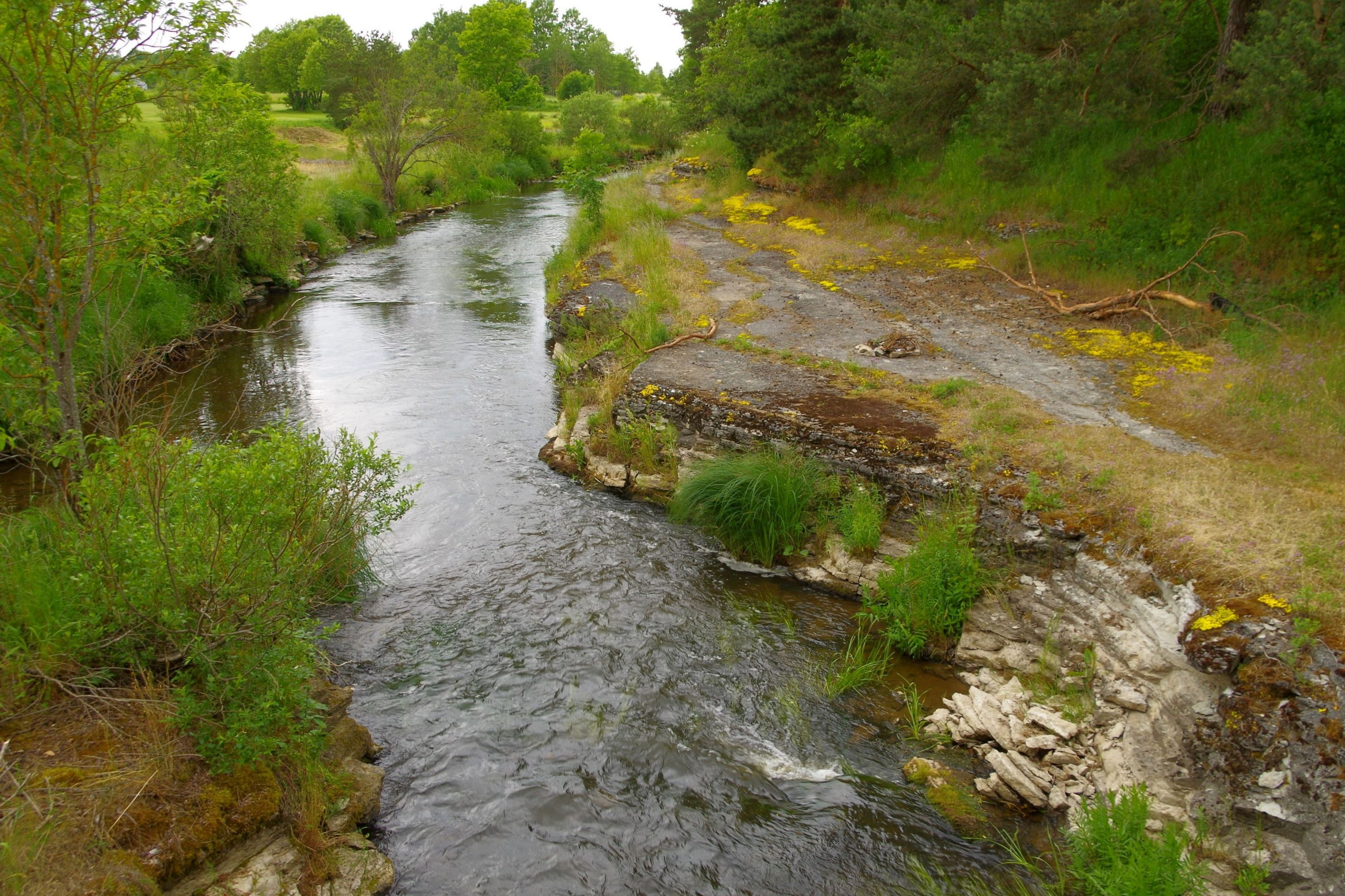

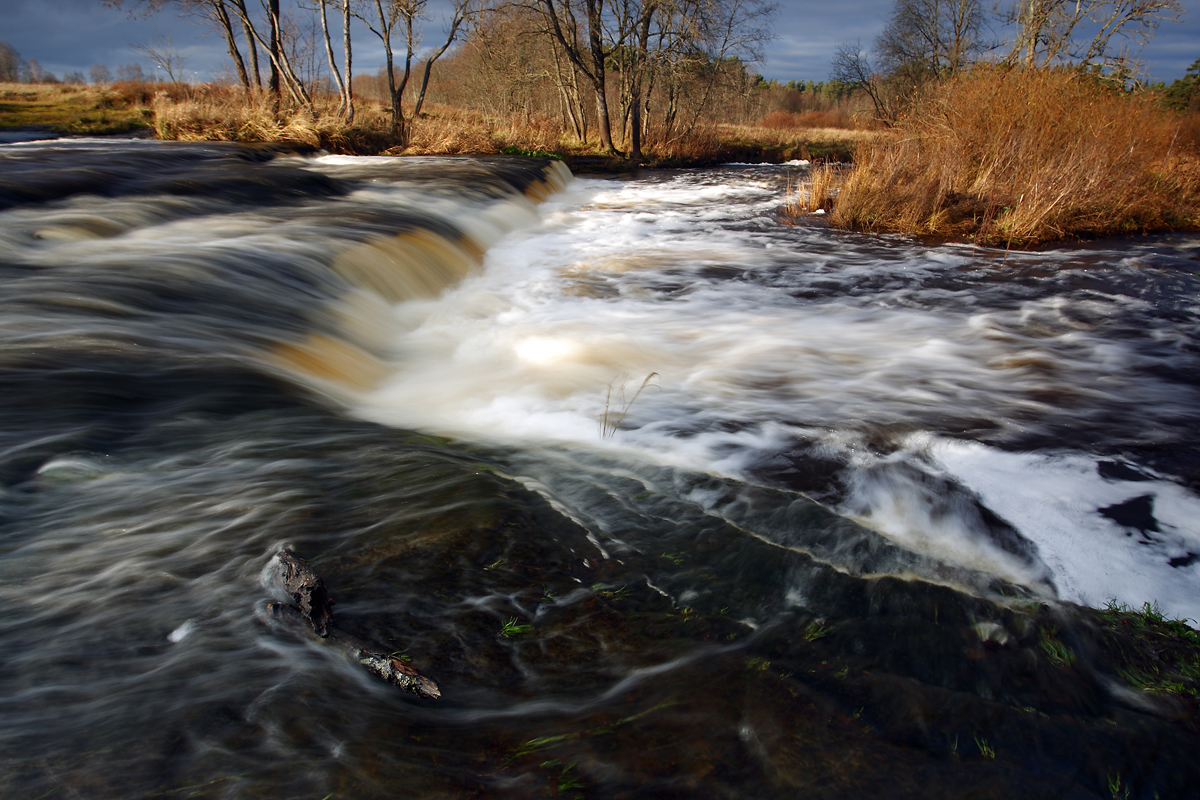
