= Sõrve =

Village in Estonia

- Village
- Location in Estonia
- Coordinates: 59°25′38″N 24°26′55″E
- Country: Estonia
- County: Harju County
- Municipality: Harku Parish
- First mentioned: 1241

Population (01.06.2010)
  - Total: 197

Sõrve is a village in Harku Parish, Harju County in northern Estonia. It has a population of 197 (as of 1 June 2010).

Sõrve was first mentioned in 1241 as Serueueræ village in the Danish Census Book.
