= Liikva =

Village in Estonia

- Village
- Location in Estonia
- Coordinates: 59°25′35″N 24°25′02″E
- Country: Estonia
- County: Harju County
- Municipality: Harku Parish
- First mentioned: 1241

Population (01.06.2010)
  - Total: 280

Liikva is a village in Harku Parish, Harju County in northern Estonia. It has a population of 517 (as of 1 December 2019).

Liikva was first mentioned in 1241 as Liqua village in the Danish Census Book.
