= Adra, Estonia =

Village in Estonia

Adra
- Village
- Location in Estonia
- Coordinates: 59°22′12″N 24°22′28″E
- Country: Estonia
- County: Harju County
- Municipality: Harku Parish

Population (01.06.2010)
  - Total: 87

Adra (German: Adders) is a village in Harku Parish, Harju County in northern Estonia. It has a population of 87 (as of 1 June 2010).
