= Kütke =

Village in Estonia

- Village
- Location in Estonia
- Coordinates: 59°20′46″N 24°25′27″E
- Country: Estonia
- County: Harju County
- Municipality: Harku Parish

Population (01.06.2010)
  - Total: 86

Kütke is a village in Harku Parish, Harju County in northern Estonia. It has a population of 86 (as of 1 June 2010).
