= Vahi, Harju County =

Village in Estonia

Vahi
- Village
- Location in Estonia
- Coordinates: 59°22′35″N 24°27′57″E
- Country: Estonia
- County: Harju County
- Municipality: Harku Parish

Population (01.06.2010)
  - Total: 81

Vahi is a village in Harku Parish, Harju County in northern Estonia. It has a population of 81 (as of 1 June 2010).

== Gallery ==
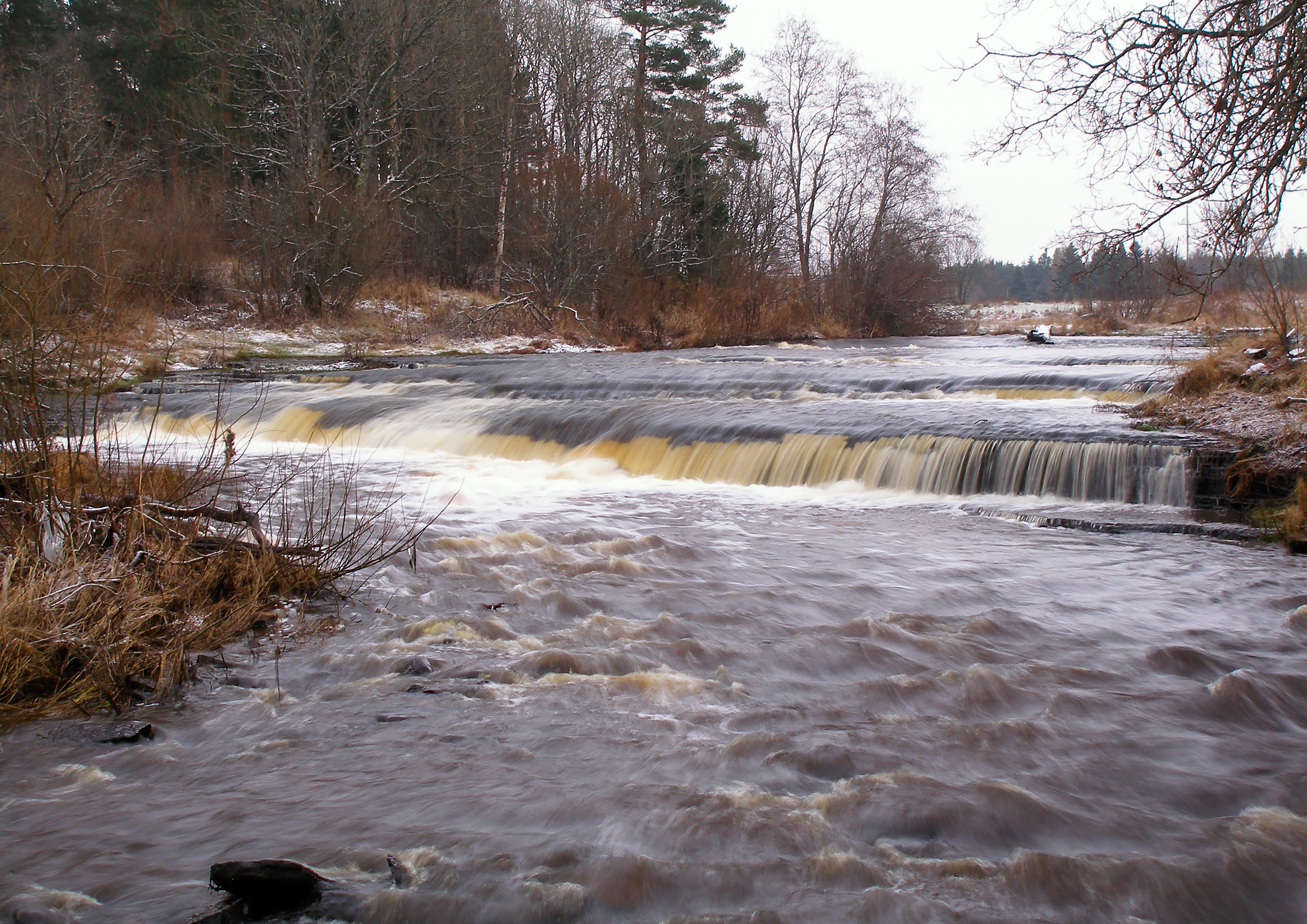
Vahiküla Waterfall on Vääna River in Vahi.

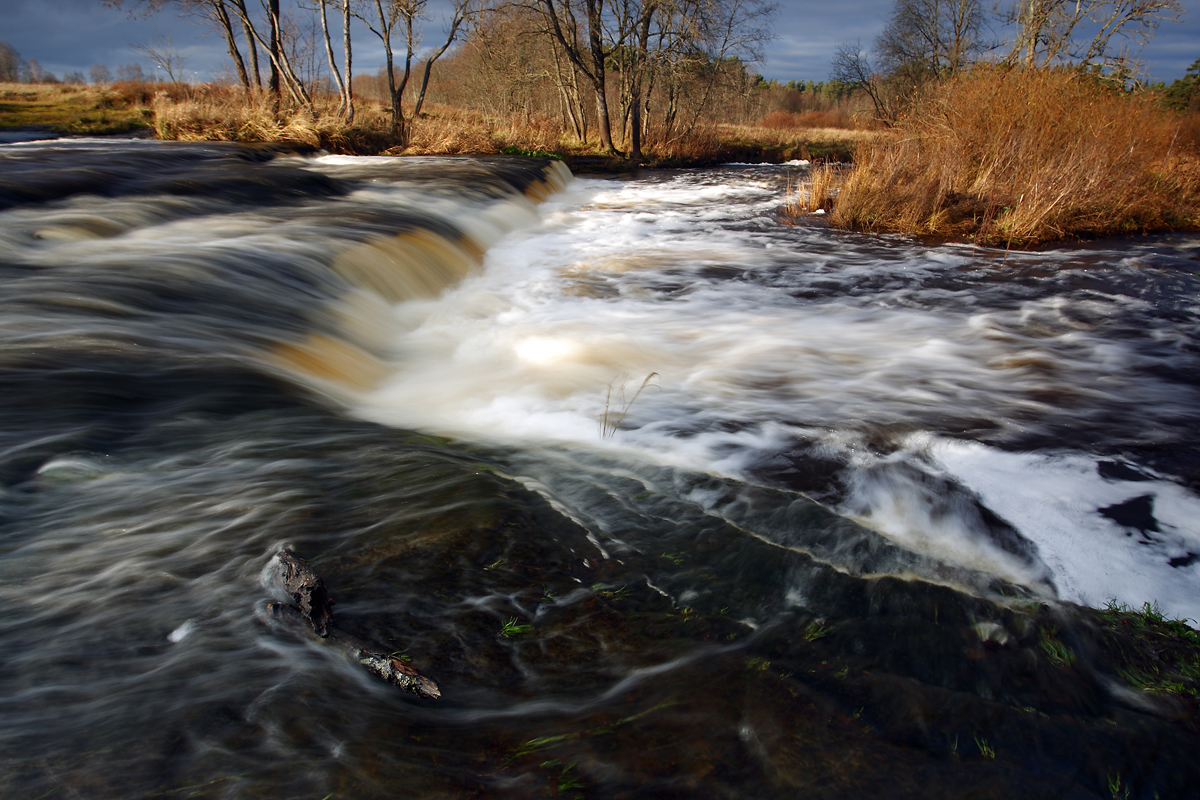
Vahiküla Waterfall
