= Vaila, Estonia =

Village in Estonia

Vaila
- Village
- Location in Estonia
- Coordinates: 59°24′06″N 24°24′2″E
- Country: Estonia
- County: Harju County
- Municipality: Harku Parish

Population (01.06.2010)
  - Total: 79

Vaila is a village in Harku Parish, Harju County in northern Estonia. It has a population of 79 (as of 1 June 2010).
