= Laabi =

Village in Estonia

- Village
- Location in Estonia
- Coordinates: 59°24′20″N 24°34′17″E
- Country: Estonia
- County: Harju County
- Municipality: Harku Parish

Population (01.06.2010)
  - Total: 88

Laabi is a village in Harku Parish, Harju County in northern Estonia. It's located west of the capital Tallinn (about 11 km (7 mi) from the city centre), behind the Lake Harku.

The eastern half of the village's territory is covered by the Harku limestone rubble quarry. In the western part there are several industrial enterprises including alcohol producer Altia and Tallegg's chicken farm. There's also a kart circuit.

Laabi has a population of 88 (as of 1 June 2010).
