= Ilmandu =

Village in Estonia

- Village
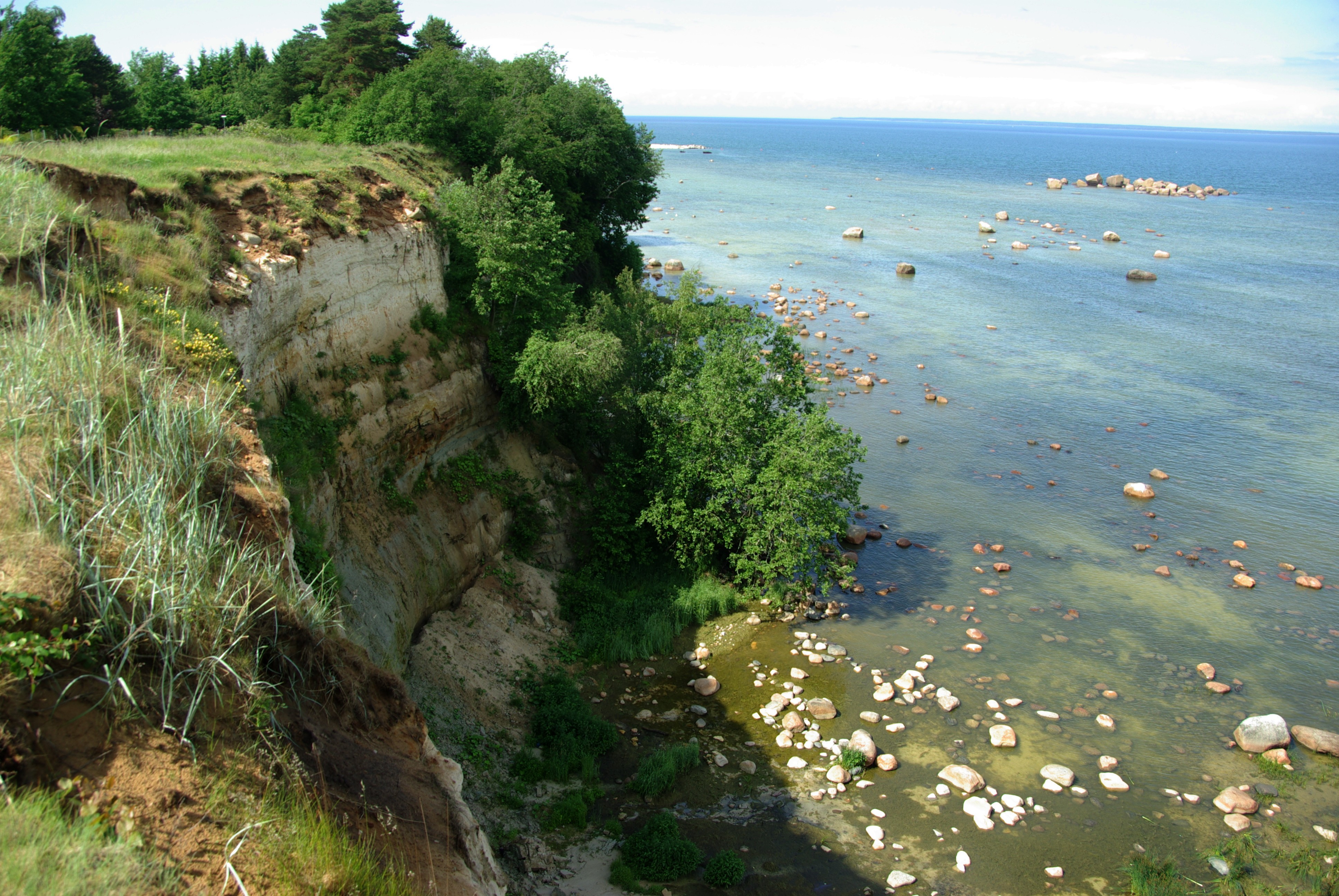
- Tilgu cliff in Ilmandu

- Location in Estonia
- Coordinates: 59°26′38″N 24°28′31″E
- Country: Estonia
- County: Harju County
- Municipality: Harku Parish

Population (01.06.2010)
  - Total: 395

Ilmandu (German: Ilmandes) is a village in Harku Parish, Harju County in northern Estonia. It has a population of 447 (as of 1 December 2019). It is a small village, about 10 kilometers from the city of Tallinn, and 2 kilometers far from Tabasalu, with very good communications and transport links.
