= Kumna =

Village in Estonia

- Village
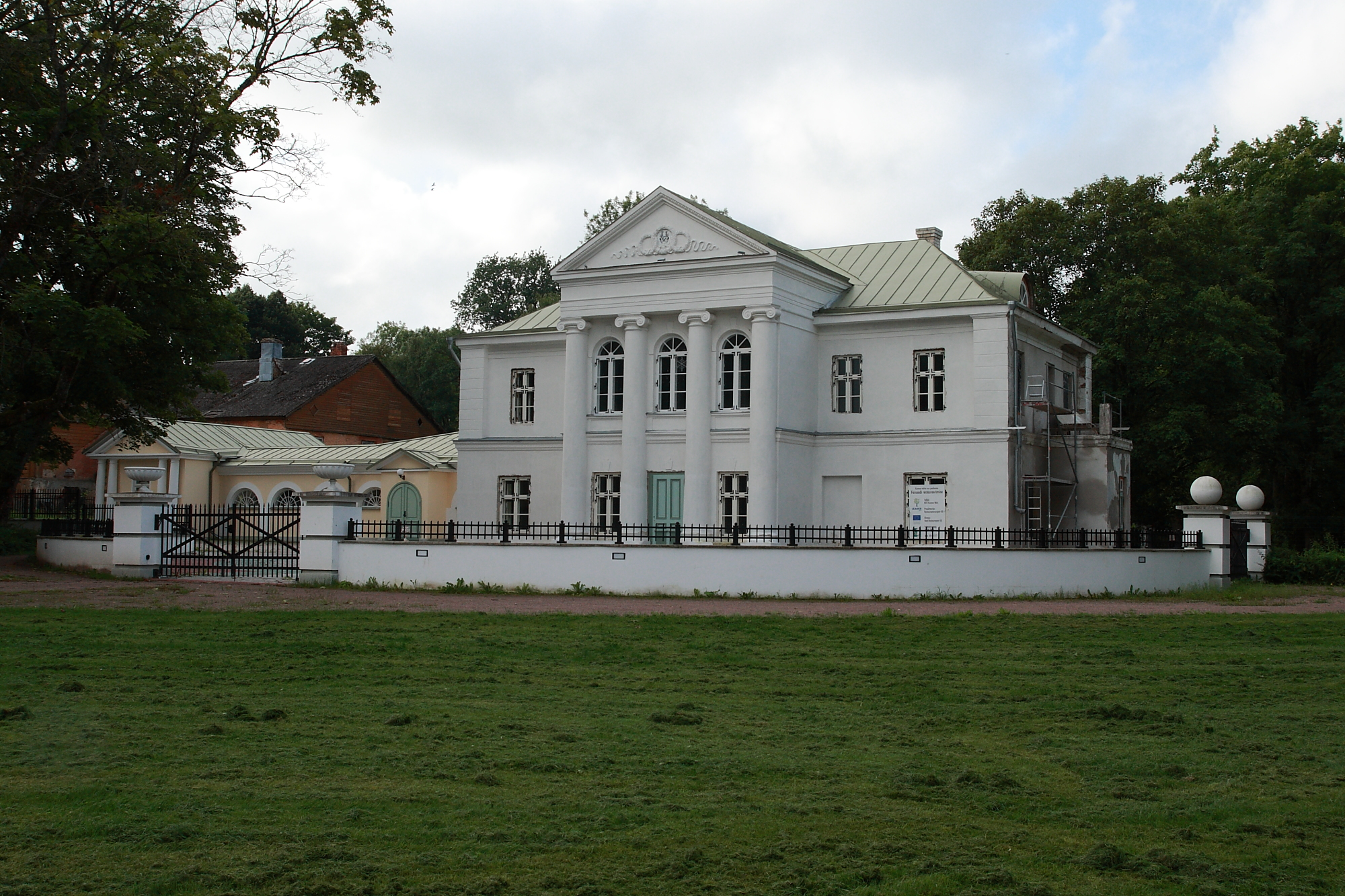
- Kumna manor

- Location in Estonia
- Coordinates: 59°19′57″N 24°26′33″E
- Country: Estonia
- County: Harju County
- Municipality: Harku Parish

Population (01.06.2010)
  - Total: 290

Kumna is a village in Harku Parish, Harju County in northern Estonia. It has a population of 290 (as of 1 June 2010).

Kumna has been the site of a manor house since the 17th century. The current manor house was built in 1913 in a neoclassical style.

In 1865 a silver hoard from the 13th century BC was found in Kumna.

== Gallery ==
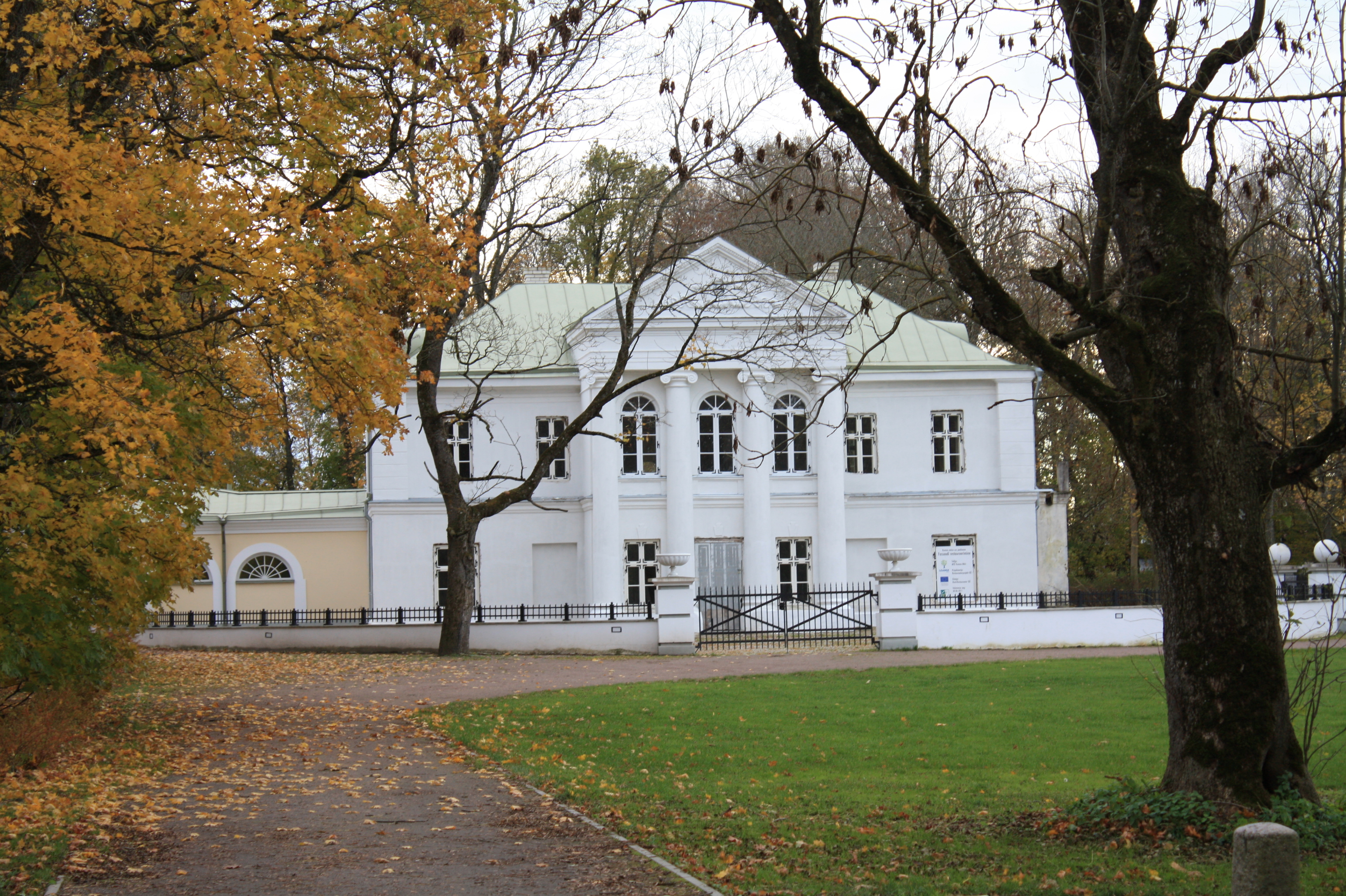
Kumna manor

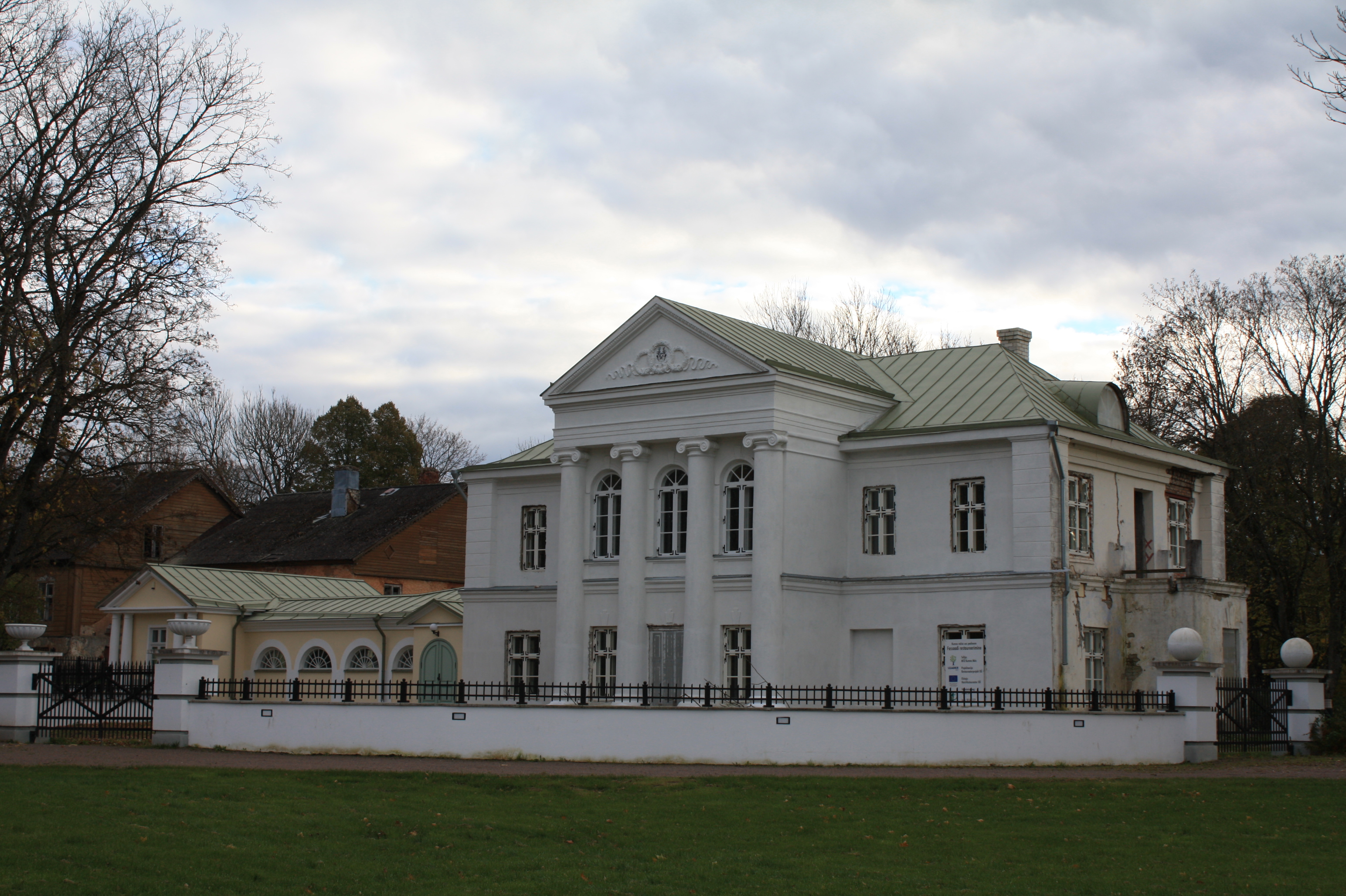
Kumna manor from the rear side

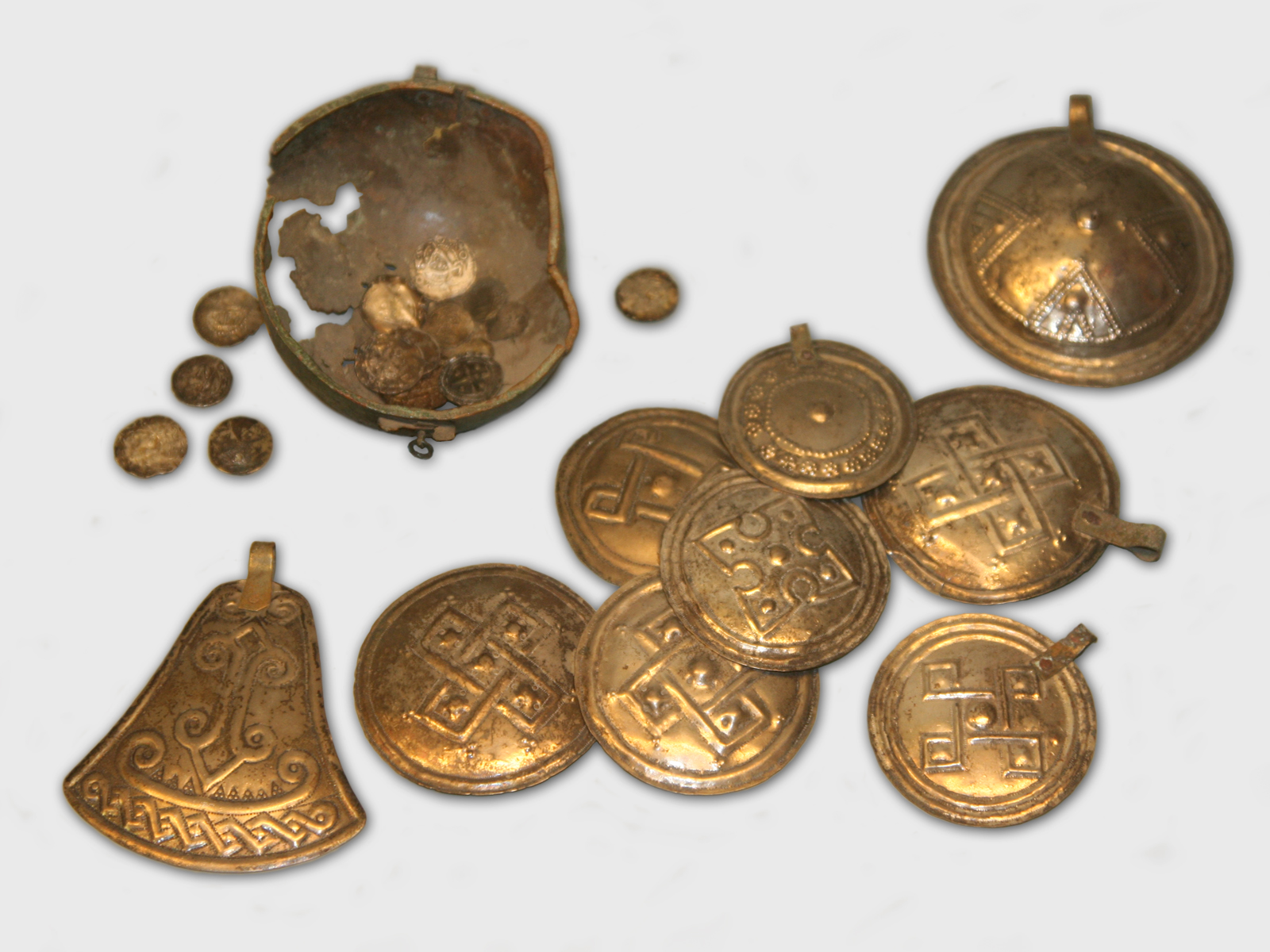
Iron Age artifacts of the hoard from Kumna.
