= Humala, Estonia =

Village in Estonia

Humala
- Village
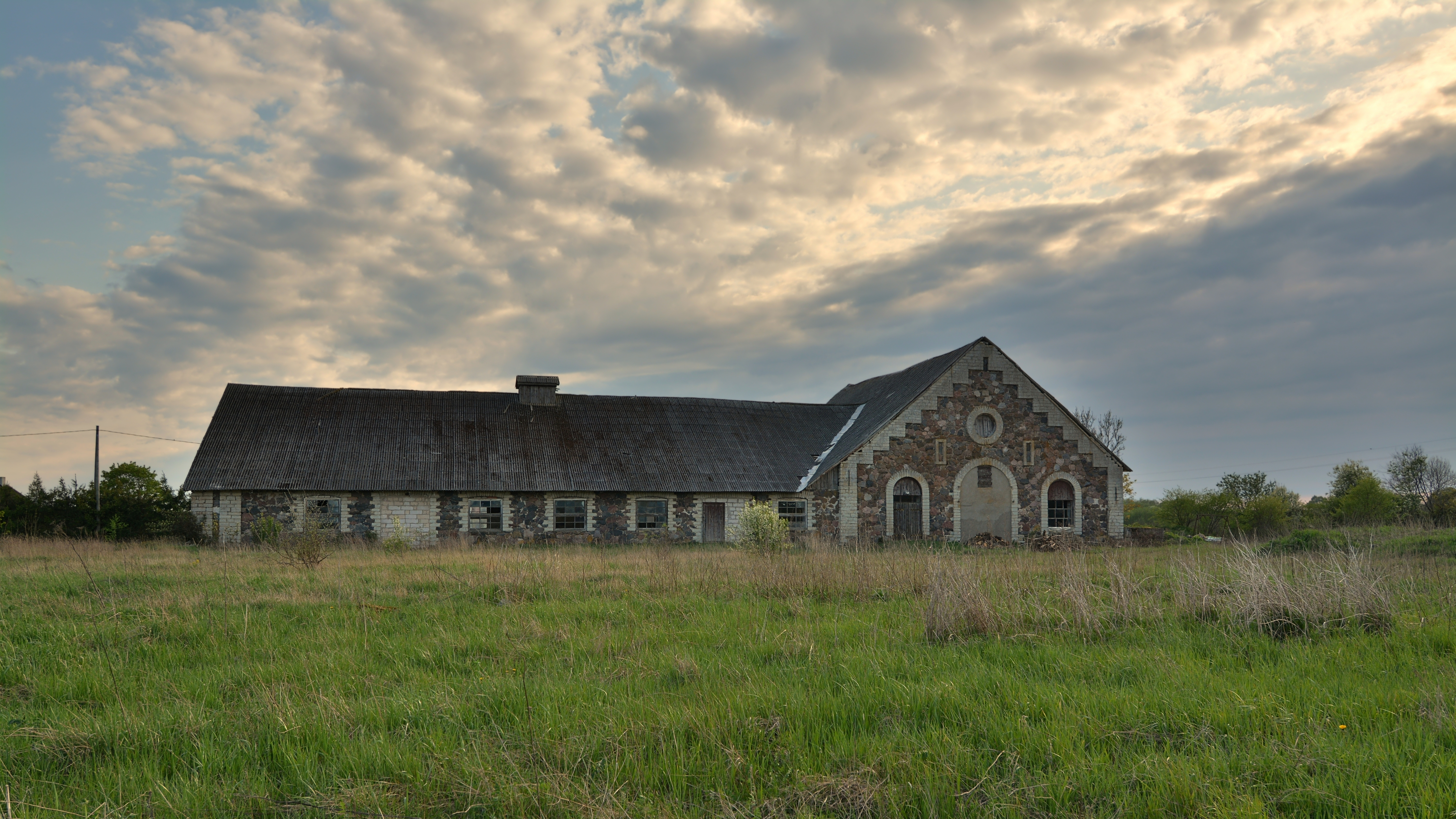
- Humala manor barn

- Location in Estonia
- Coordinates: 59°21′31″N 24°23′45″E
- Country: Estonia
- County: Harju County
- Municipality: Harku Parish

Population (01.06.2010)
  - Total: 33

Humala (German: Hommeln) is a village in Harku Parish, Harju County in northern Estonia. It has a population of 33 (as of 1 June 2010).
