= Naage =

Village in Estonia

- Village
- Location in Estonia
- Coordinates: 59°24′20″N 24°21′45″E
- Country: Estonia
- County: Harju County
- Municipality: Harku Parish

Population (01.06.2010)
  - Total: 124

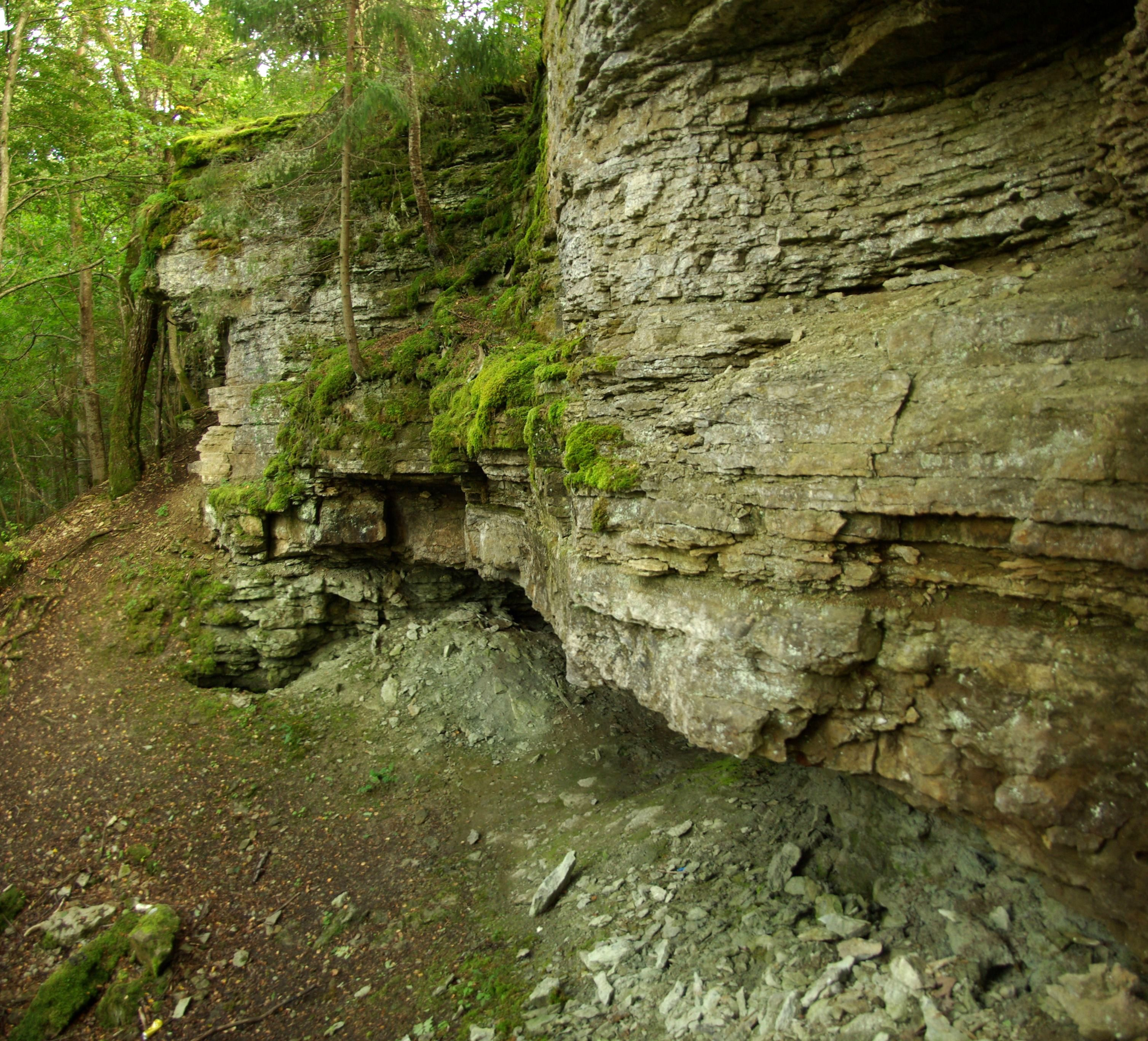
Naage Cliff

Naage is a village in Harku Parish, Harju County in northern Estonia. It has a population of 124 (as of 1 June 2010).
