= Tiskre =

Village in Estonia

- Village
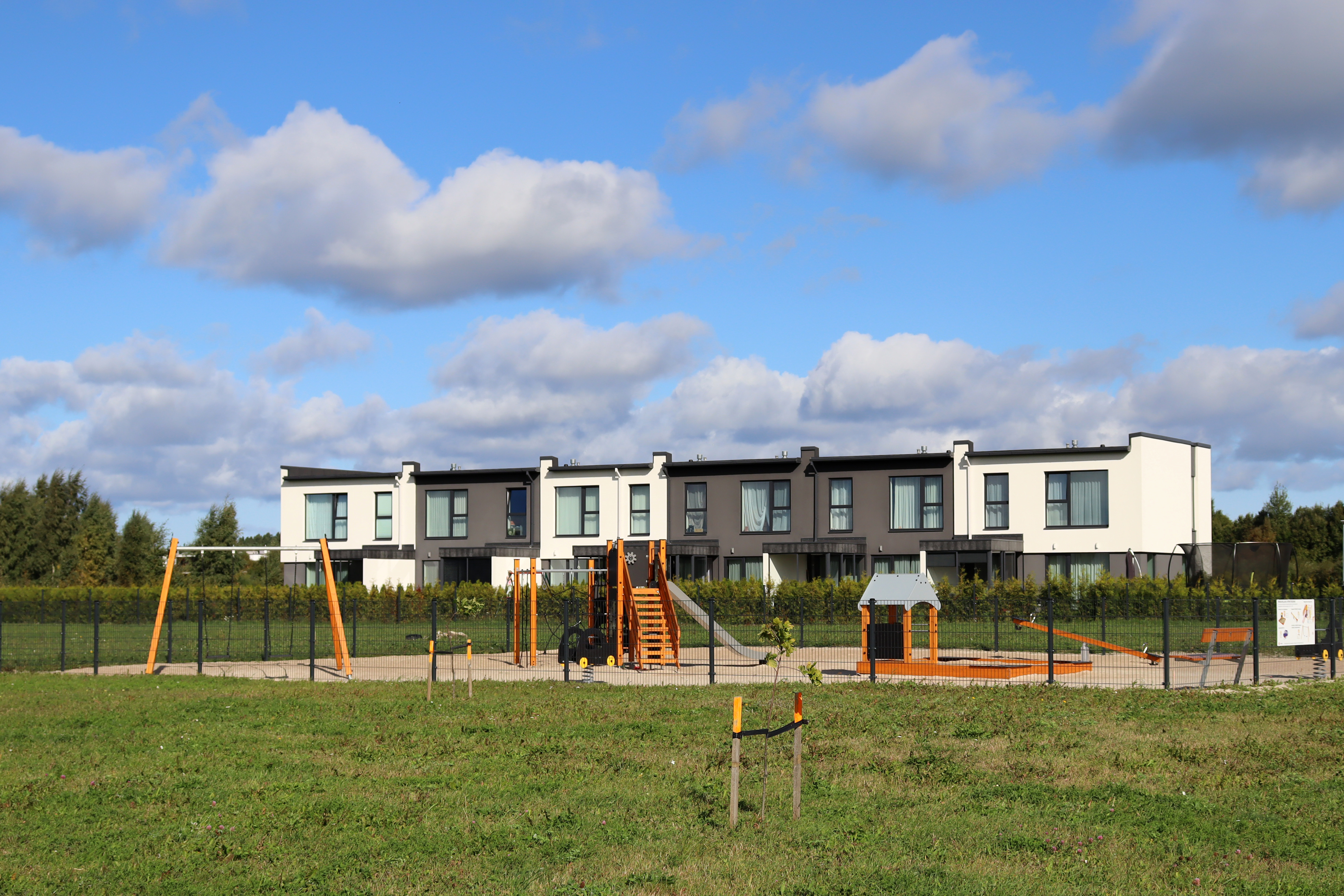

- Location in Estonia
- Coordinates: 59°25′55″N 24°33′40″E
- Country: Estonia
- County: Harju County
- Municipality: Harku Parish

Population (01.06.2010)
  - Total: 681

Tiskre is a village in Harku Parish, Harju County in northern Estonia. It has a population of 681 (as of 1 June 2010).
