= Vääna-Jõesuu =

Village in Estonia

- Village
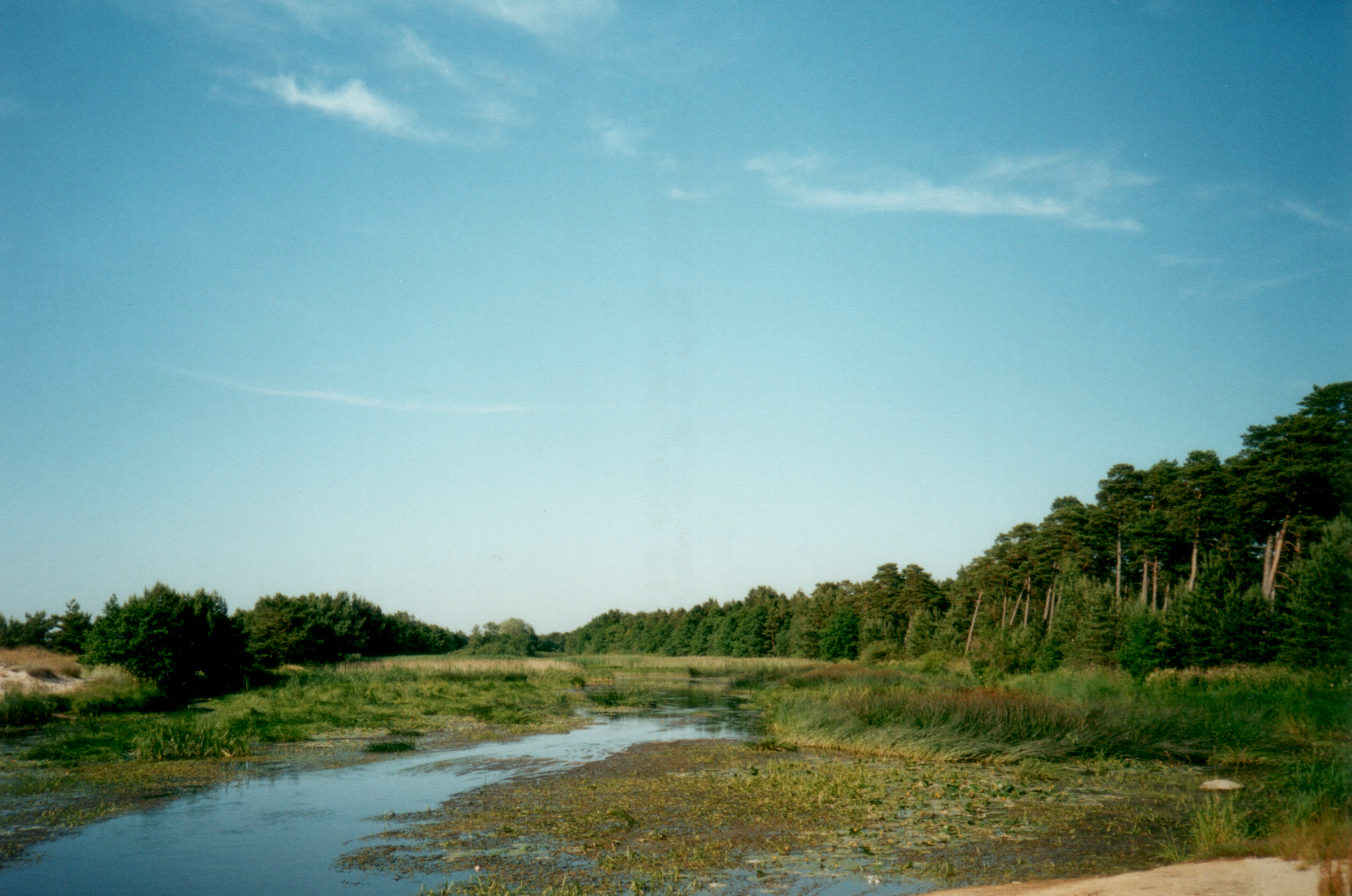
- Vääna River near its mouth in Vääna-Jõesuu.

- Location in Estonia
- Coordinates: 59°26′06″N 24°21′29″E
- Country: Estonia
- County: Harju County
- Municipality: Harku Parish

Population (01.06.2010)
  - Total: 686

Vääna-Jõesuu is a village in Harku Parish, Harju County in northern Estonia. It has a population of 1184 (as of 1 December 2019).
