= Meriküla, Harju County =

Village in Estonia

- Village
- Location within Estonia
- Coordinates: 59.4553°N 24.4815°E
- Country: Estonia
- County: Harju County
- Parish: Harku Parish
- Time zone: UTC+2 (EET)
  - Summer (DST): UTC+3 (EEST)

Meriküla is a village in Harku Parish, Harju County in Estonia.
