= Muraste =

Village in Estonia

- Village
- Location within Estonia
- Coordinates: 59.4547°N 24.4394°E
- Country: Estonia
- County: Harju County
- Parish: Harku Parish

Population (01.06.2010)
  - Total: 1,435
- Time zone: UTC+2 (EET)
  - Summer (DST): UTC+3 (EEST)

Muraste (German: Morras) is a village in Harku Parish, Harju County in northern Estonia. It has a population of 1,860 (as of 1 December 2019).

== Muraste Manor ==
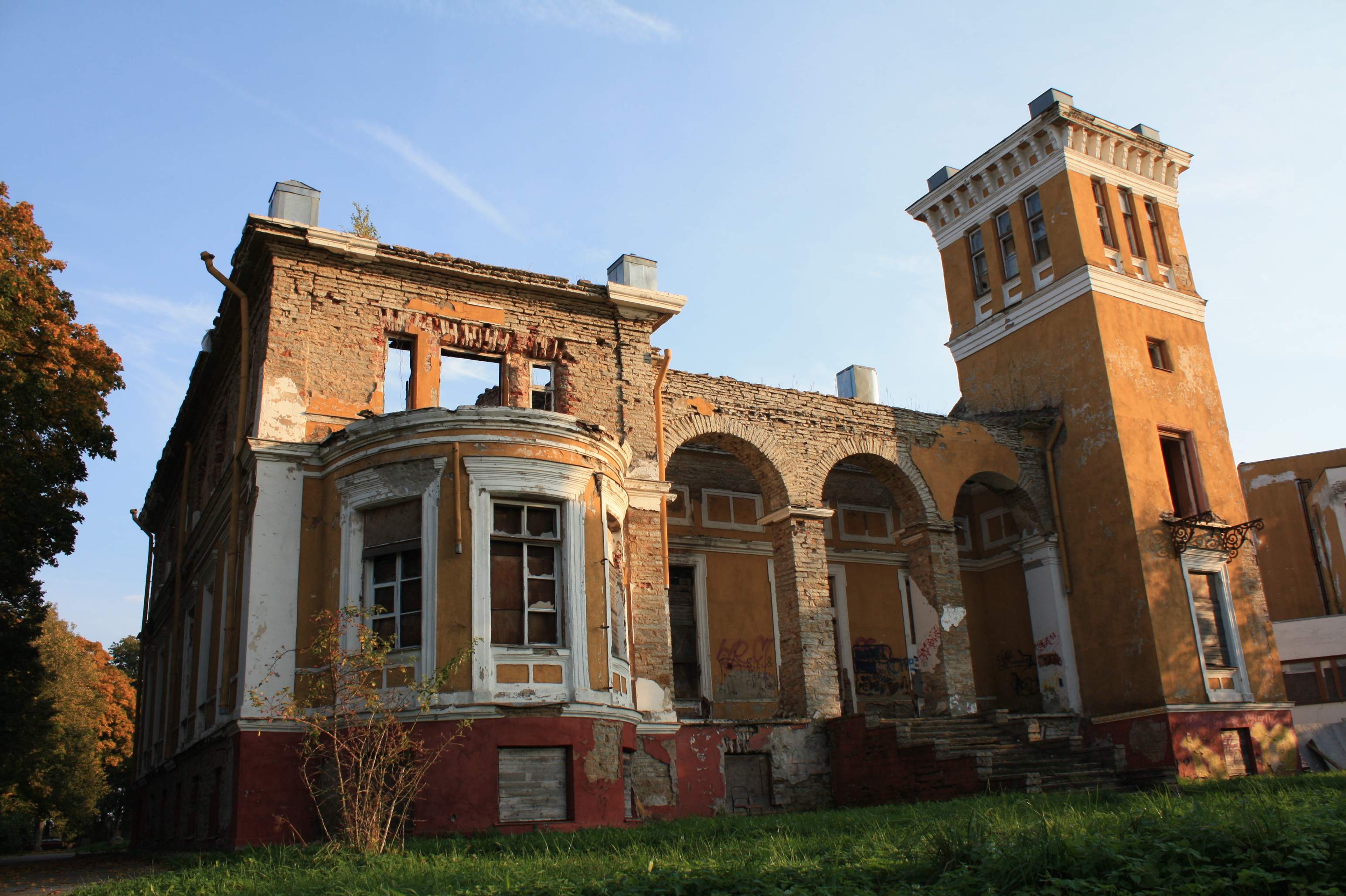
Ruins of Muraste Manor

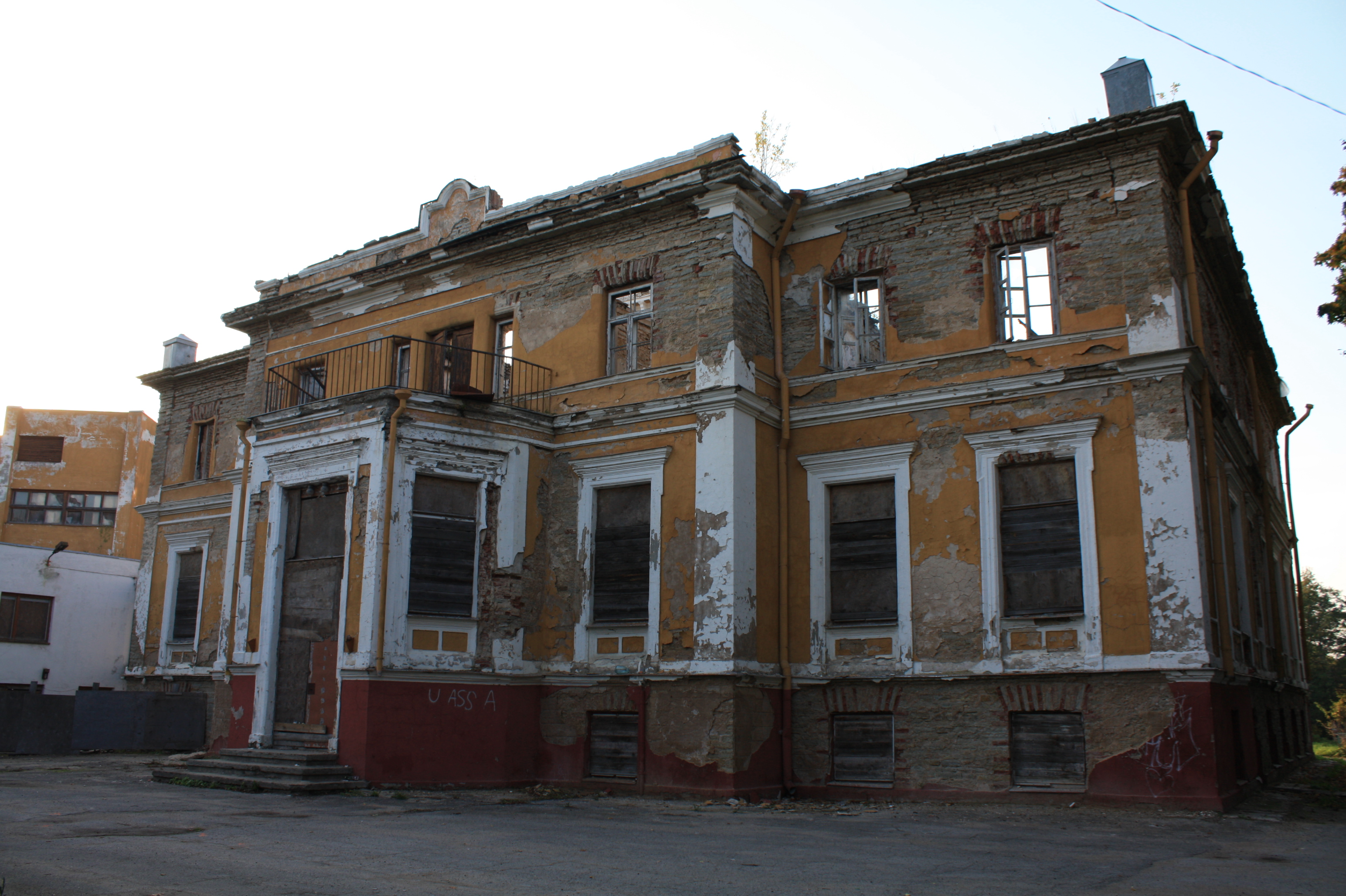

== Notable people ==
Notable people that were born or lived in Muraste include the following:

- Erni Krusten (1900–1984), writer
- Otto Krusten (1888–1937), caricaturist
- Pedro Krusten (1897–1987), writer
