= Viti, Estonia =

Village in Estonia

Viti
- Village
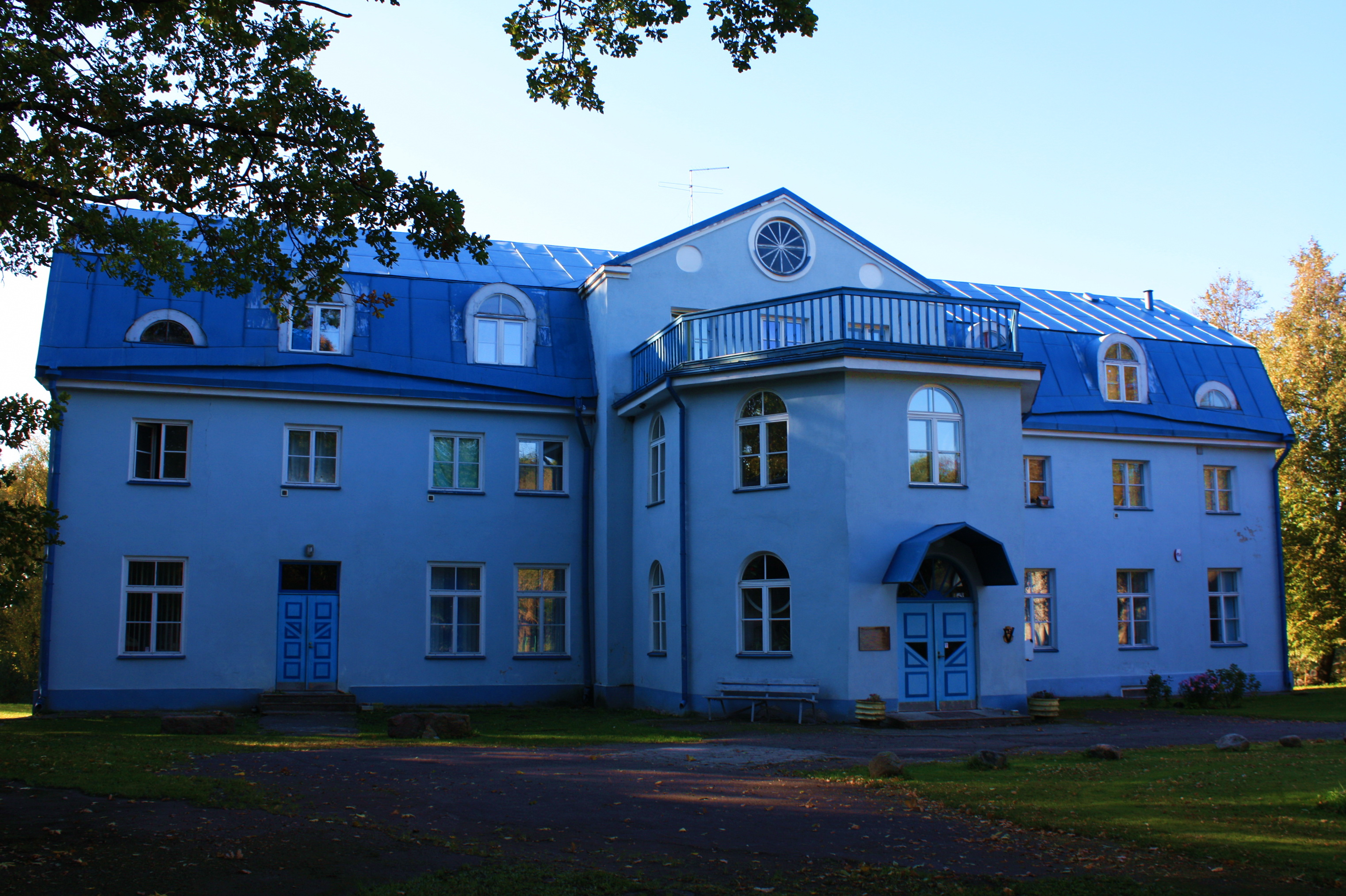
- Viti Manor

- Location in Estonia
- Coordinates: 59°26′45″N 24°22′48″E
- Country: Estonia
- County: Harju County
- Municipality: Harku Parish

Population (01.06.2010)
  - Total: 331

Viti (German: Wittenpöwel) is a village in Harku Parish, Harju County in northern Estonia. It has a population of 331 (as of 1 June 2010).
