= Harku Parish =

Municipality of Estonia

Coordinates: 59°26′N 24°33′E

Harku Parish Harku vald
- Municipality of Estonia
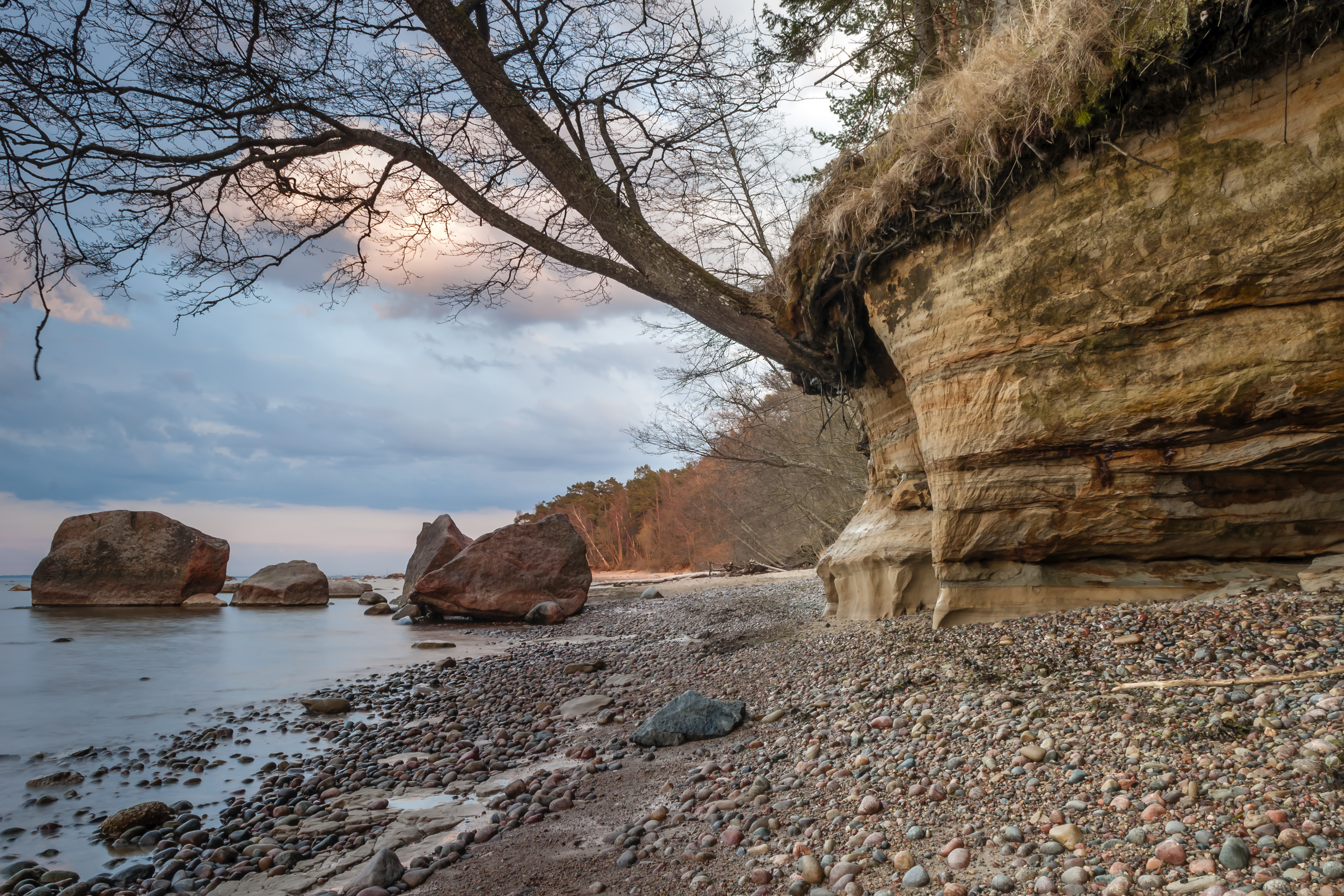

- Flag Coat of arms

- Harku Parish within Harju County (yellow) and within Estonia
- Country: Estonia
- County: Harju County
- Administrative centre: Tabasalu

Government
  - Mayor: Erik Sandla (IRL)

Area
  - Total: 159.77 km^{2} (61.69 sq mi)

Population (2026)
  - Total: 19,128▲
  - Density: 119.72/km^{2} (310.08/sq mi)
- ISO 3166 code: EE-198
- Website: www.harku.ee

Harku Parish (Estonian: Harku vald) is a rural municipality in Harju County, northern Estonia, located west and neighbouring the capital Tallinn. It occupies an area of 159.77 km^{2} (61.69 sq mi) and has a population of 19,128 (as of January 1, 2026). The population density is 119.722/km^{2} (310.079/sq mi).

The administrative centre of Harku Parish is Tabasalu, a small borough with population of 3,845.

== Local government ==
The current mayor of Harku Parish is Erik Sandla from the Union of Pro Patria and Res Publica. Current chairman of the council (volikogu esimees) is Kalle Palling MP.

== Demographics ==
As of 1 January 2026, the parish had 19,128 residents, of which 9,733 (50.9%) were women and 9,395 (49.1%) were men.

=== Religion ===
Among residents of the parish above 15 years of age, 8.6 per cent declared themselves to be Lutheran, 5.3 per cent to be Orthodox, 1.4 per cent to be Buddhist, while other Christian denominations made up 2.5 per cent of the population. The majority of residents of the parish, 80.7 per cent, were religiously unaffiliated. 1.5 per cent of the population followed other religions or did not specify their religious affiliation.

The congregations operating in the municipality are the Rannamõisa and Harkujärve congregations of the Estonian Evangelical Lutheran Church.

== Geography ==
=== Populated places ===
There are two small boroughs (alevikud, sg. - alevik) and 22 villages (külad, sg. - küla) in Harku Parish.

Small boroughs: Harku, Tabasalu

Villages: Adra, Harkujärve, Humala, Ilmandu, Kumna, Kütke, Laabi, Liikva, Meriküla, Muraste, Naage, Rannamõisa, Sõrve, Suurupi, Tiskre, Türisalu, Tutermaa, Vääna, Vääna-Jõesuu, Vahi, Vaila, Viti

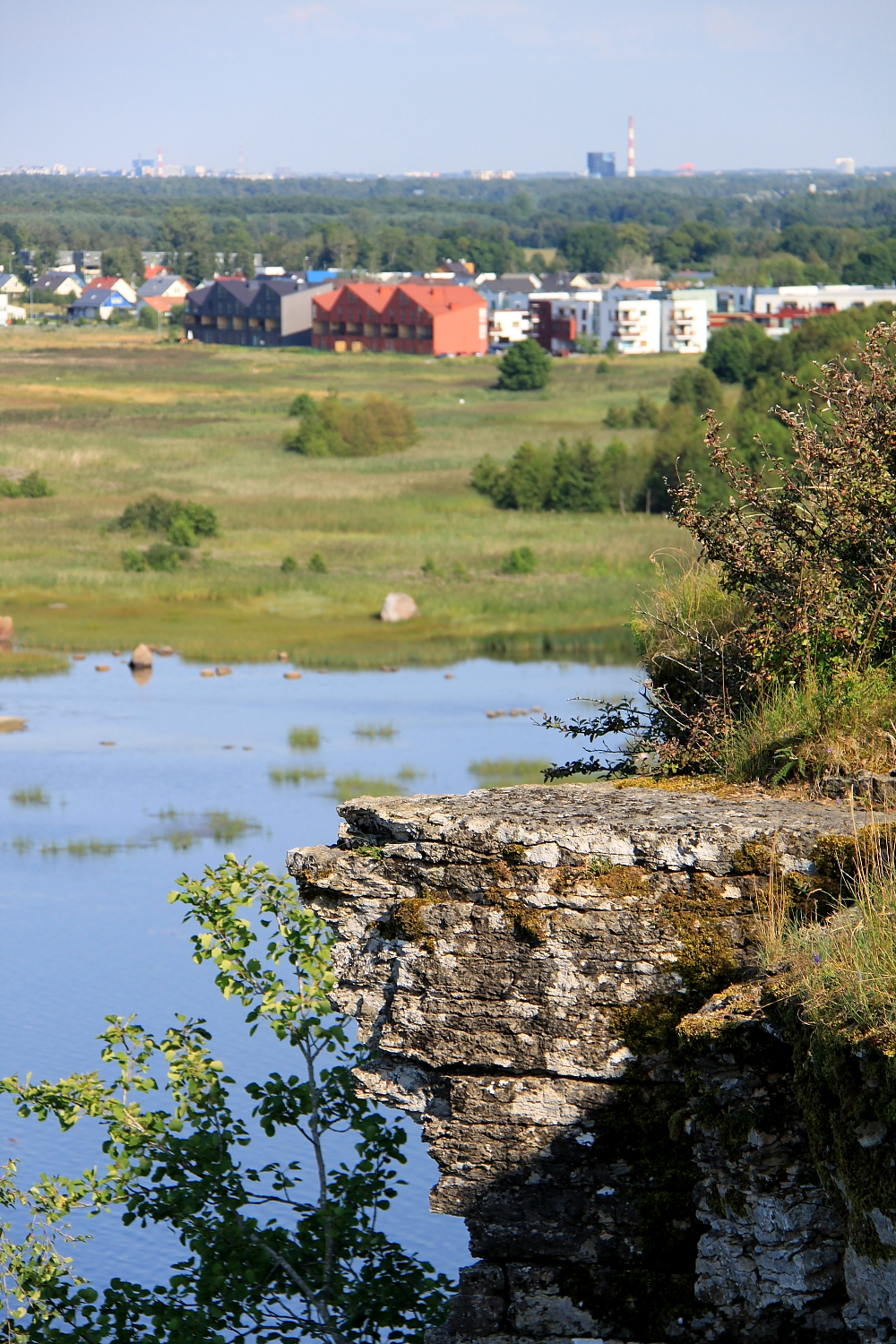
Tabasalu

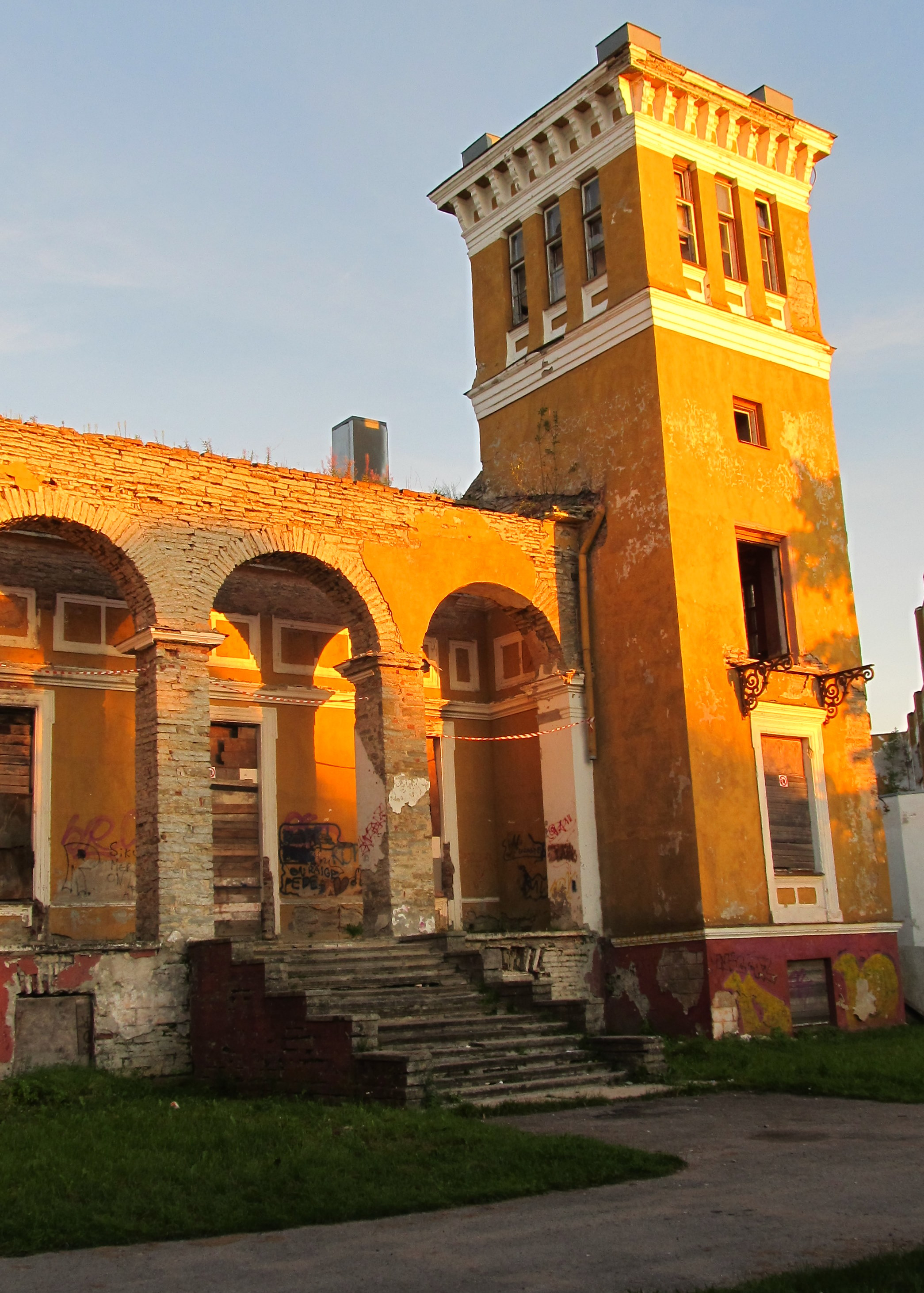
Muraste

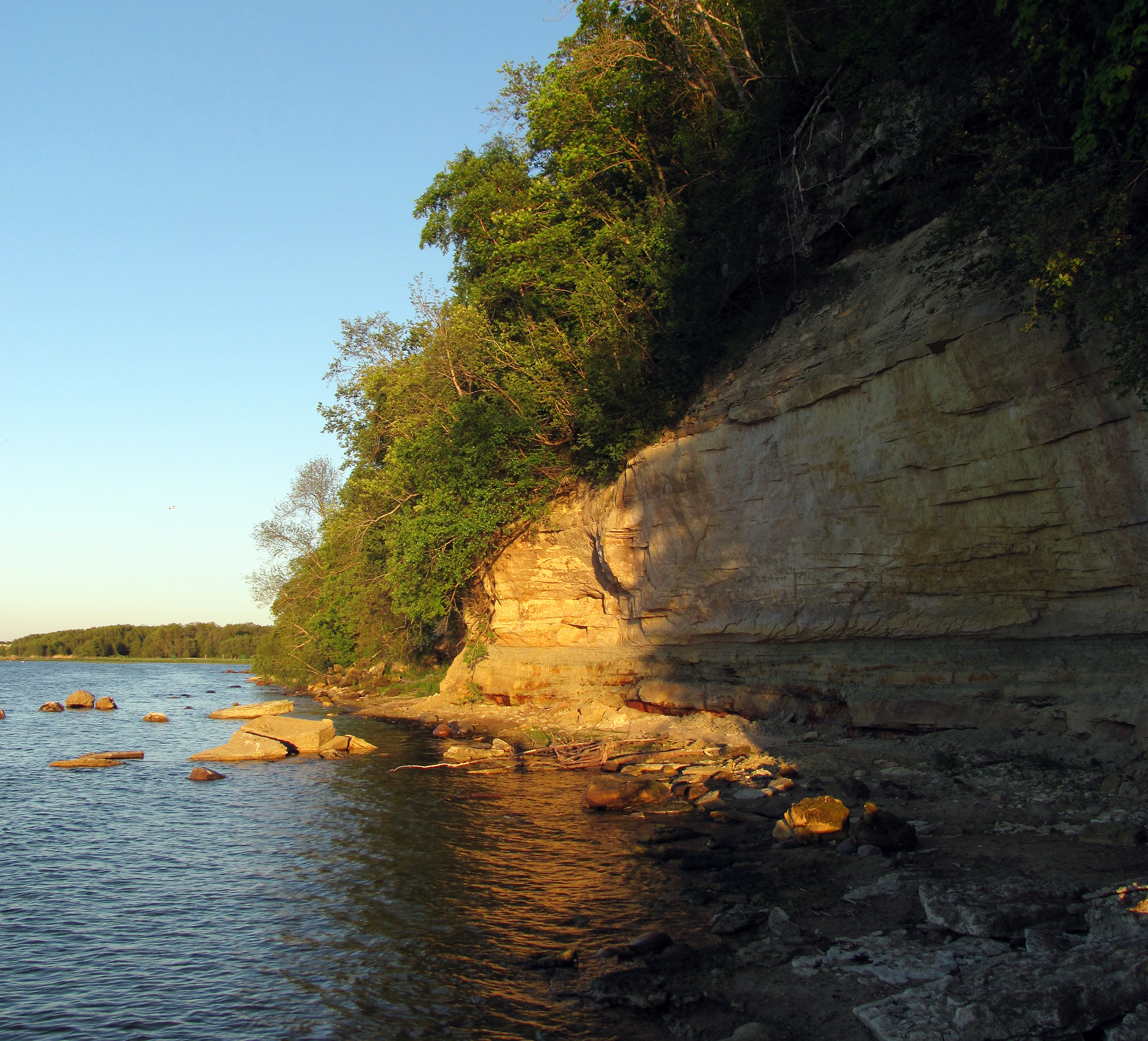
Rannamõisa

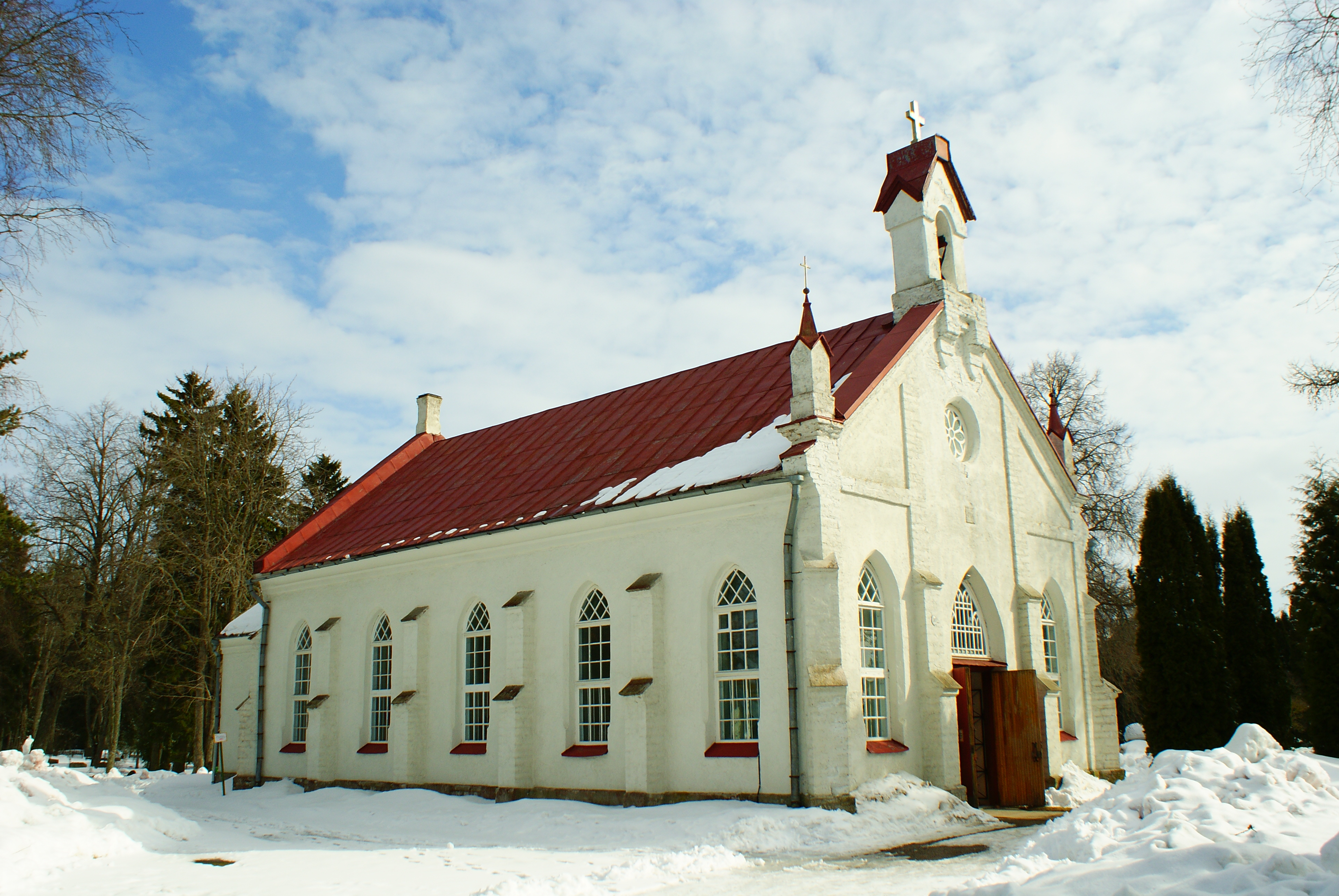
Ranna church

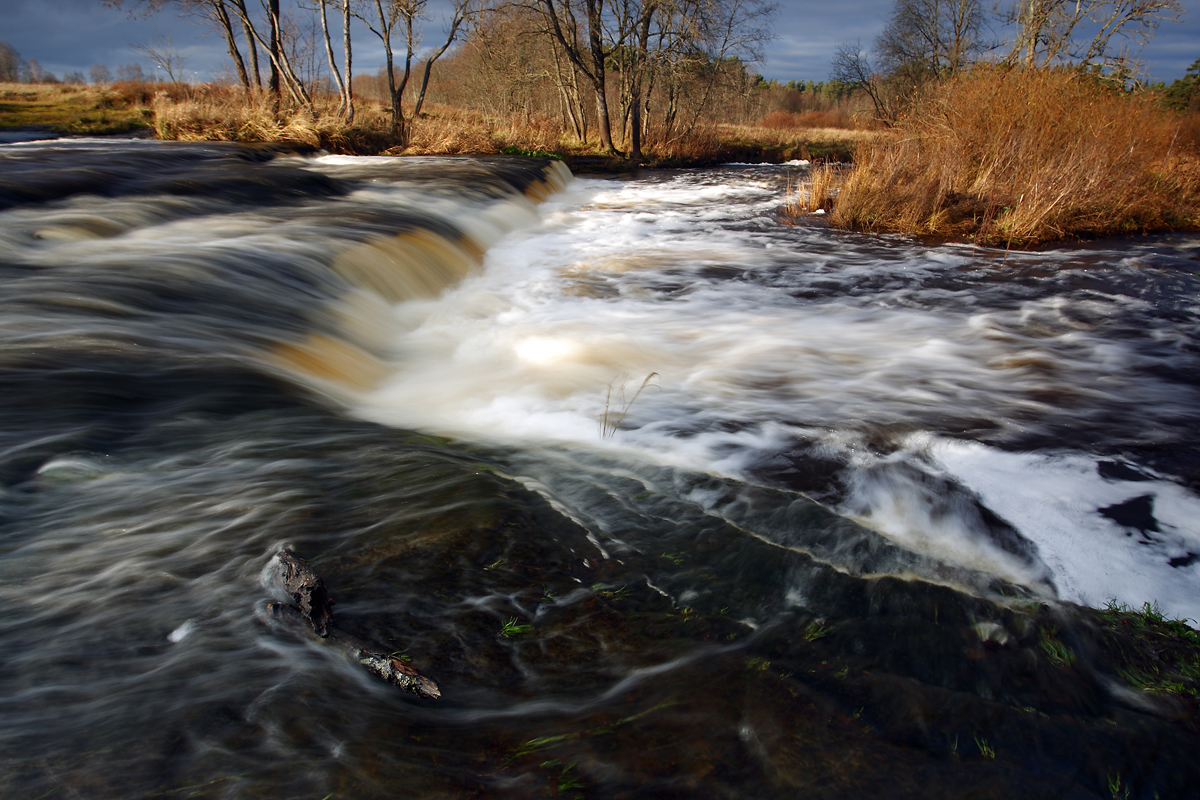
Vahiküla waterfall

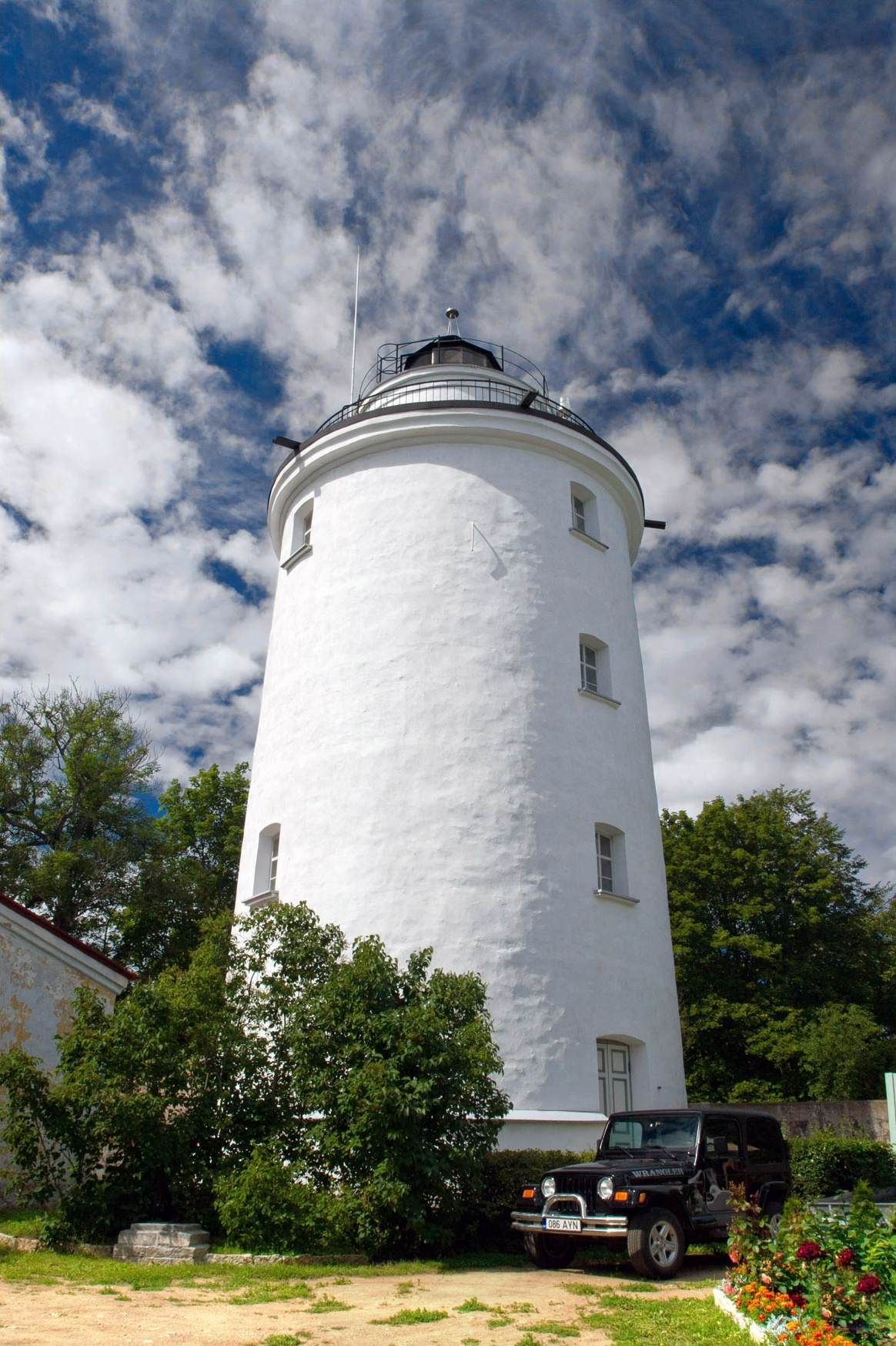
Suurupi upper lighthouse

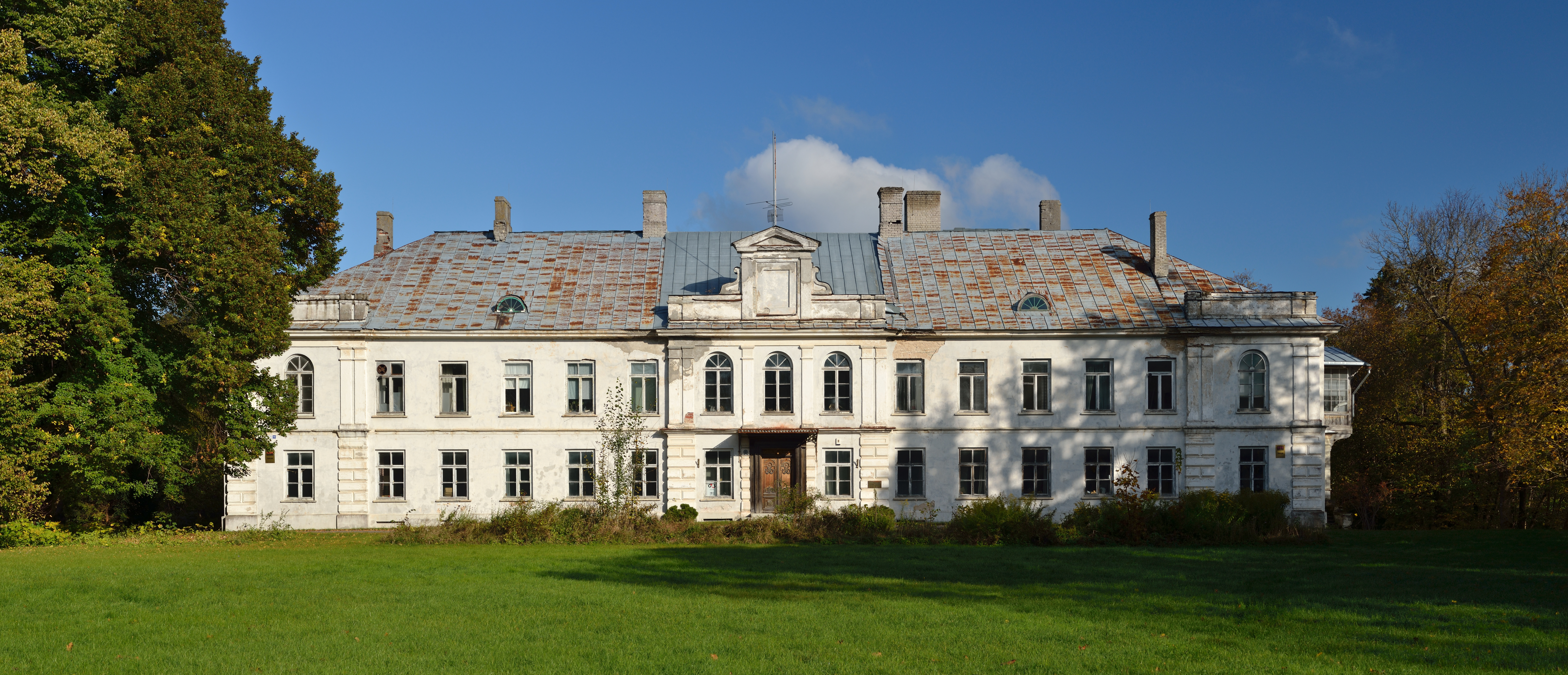
Harku manor

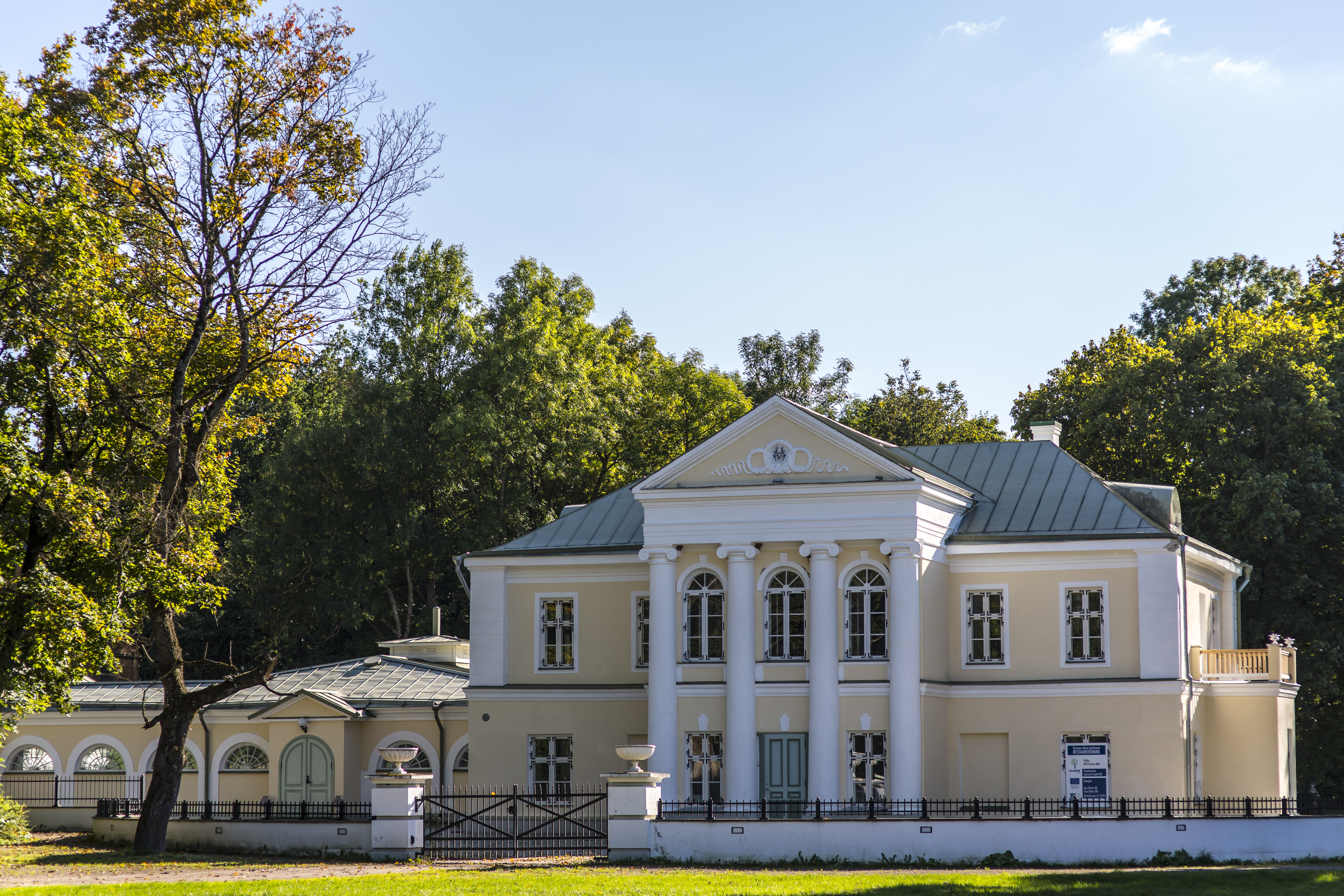
Kumna manor

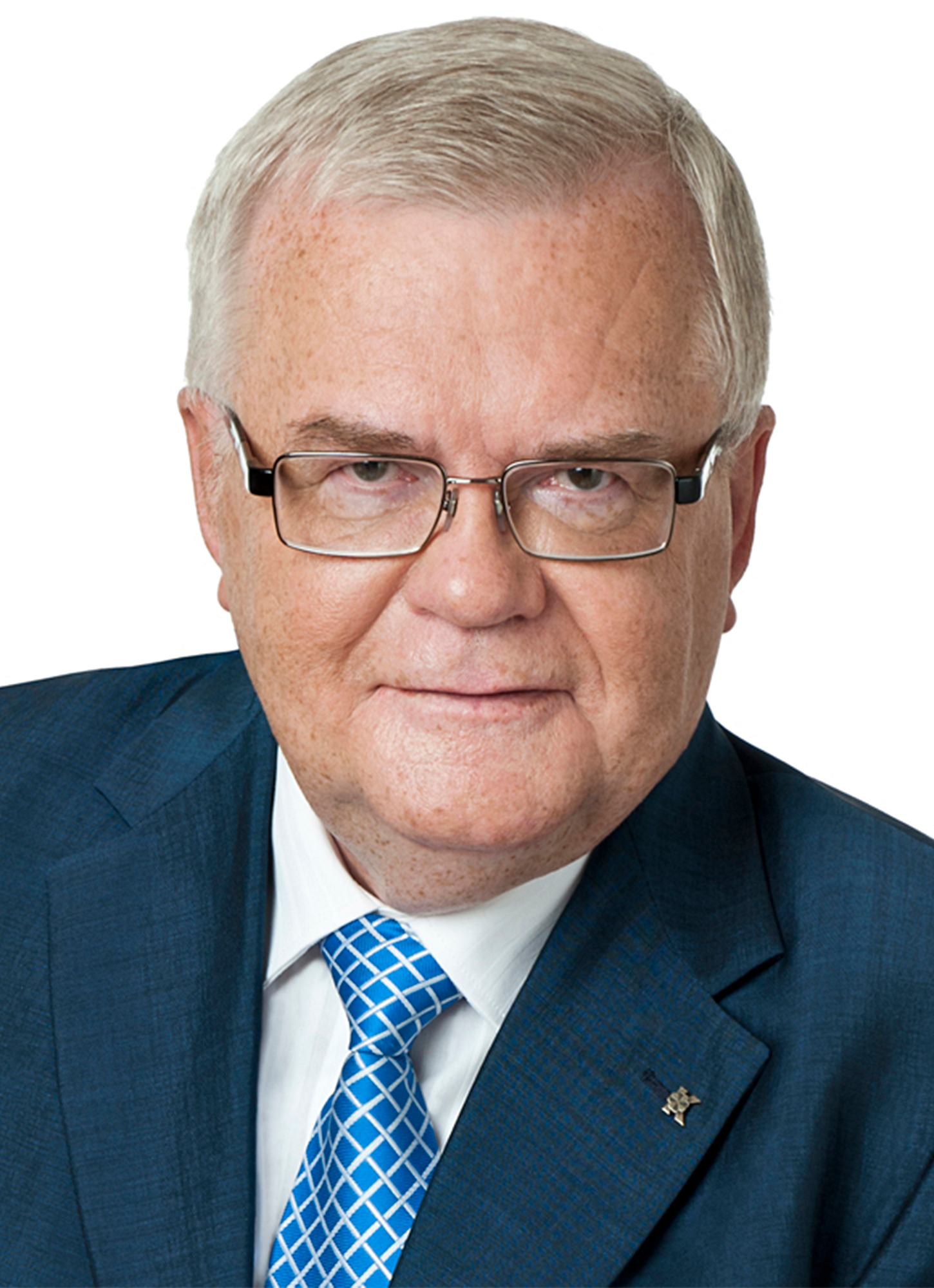
Edgar Savisaar 2013

== Notable people ==
- Otto Krusten (1888 in Muraste – 1937), a caricaturist.
- Anne Margiste (born 1942 in Vääna), a stage, film, and TV actress
- Edgar Savisaar (1950 in Harku – 2022), politician, acting Prime Minister of Estonia, 1991/1992 and Mayor of Tallinn, 2007/2017
- Karmen Bruus (born 2005 in Muraste), high jumper, gold medallist aged 17 at the 2022 World Athletics U20 Championships
