= Suurupi =

Village in Estonia

- Village
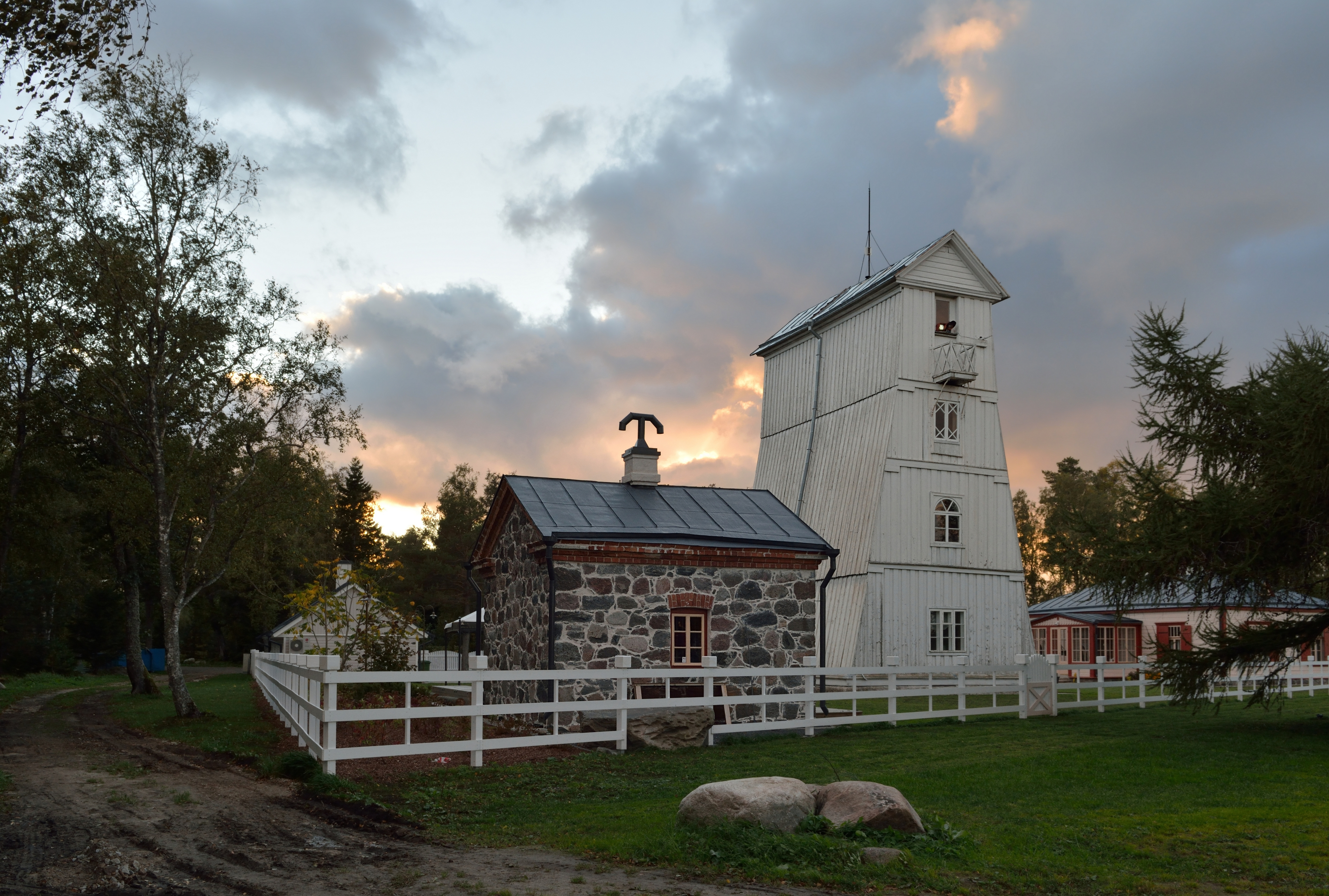
- Wooden Suurupi front lighthouse, built in 1859

- Location in Estonia
- Coordinates: 59°28′09″N 24°23′02″E
- Country: Estonia
- County: Harju County
- Municipality: Harku Parish

Population (2010-06-01)
  - Total: 756

Suurupi is a village in Harku Parish, Harju County in northern Estonia. It has a population of 1,180 (as of 1 December 2019).

Suurupi is the birthplace of Estonian artist August Albo (1893–1963). There are two range lights located in Suurupi, Suurupi Rear Lighthouse and Suurupi Front Lighthouse.

== Gallery ==
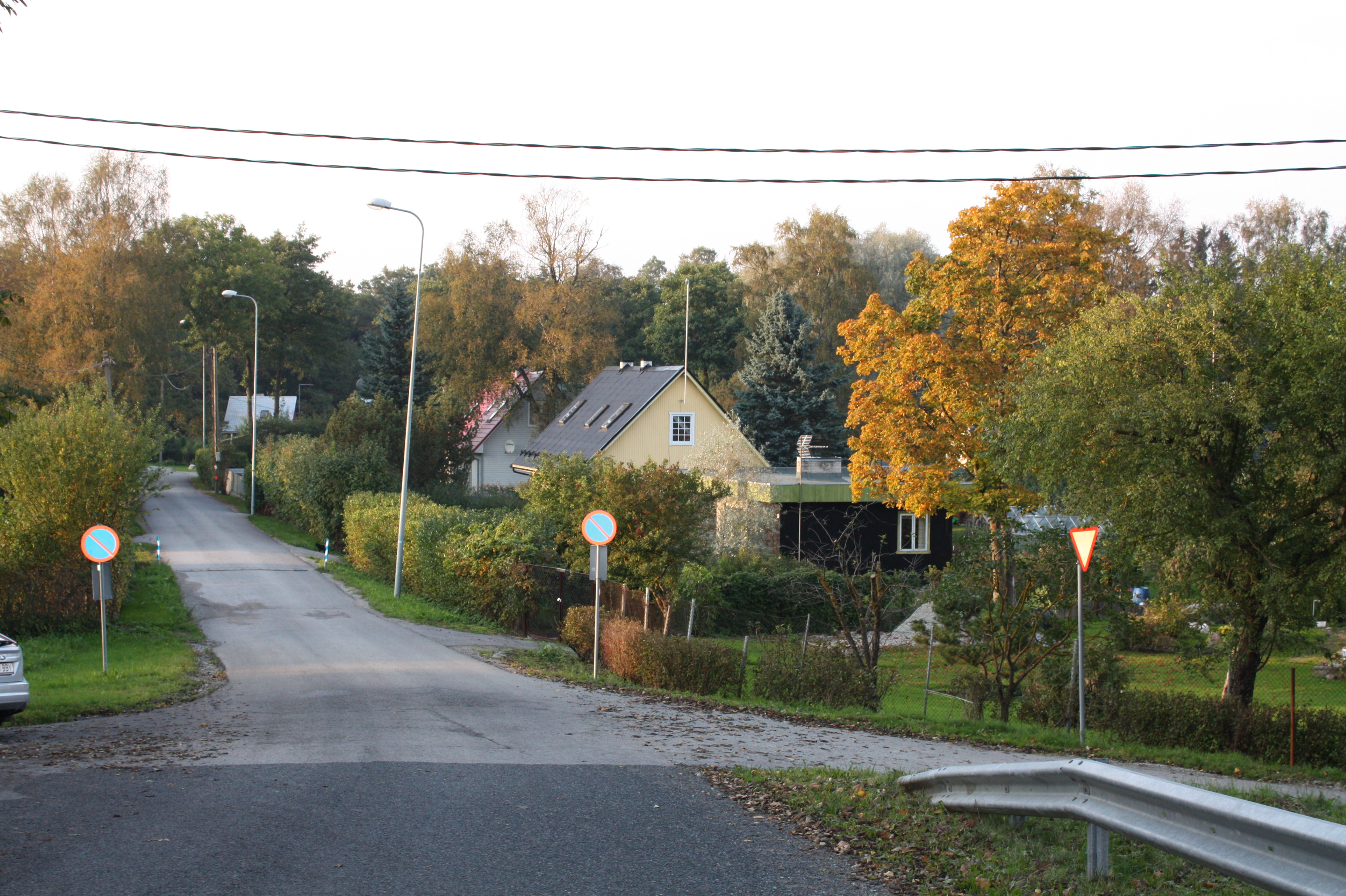
Suurupi village

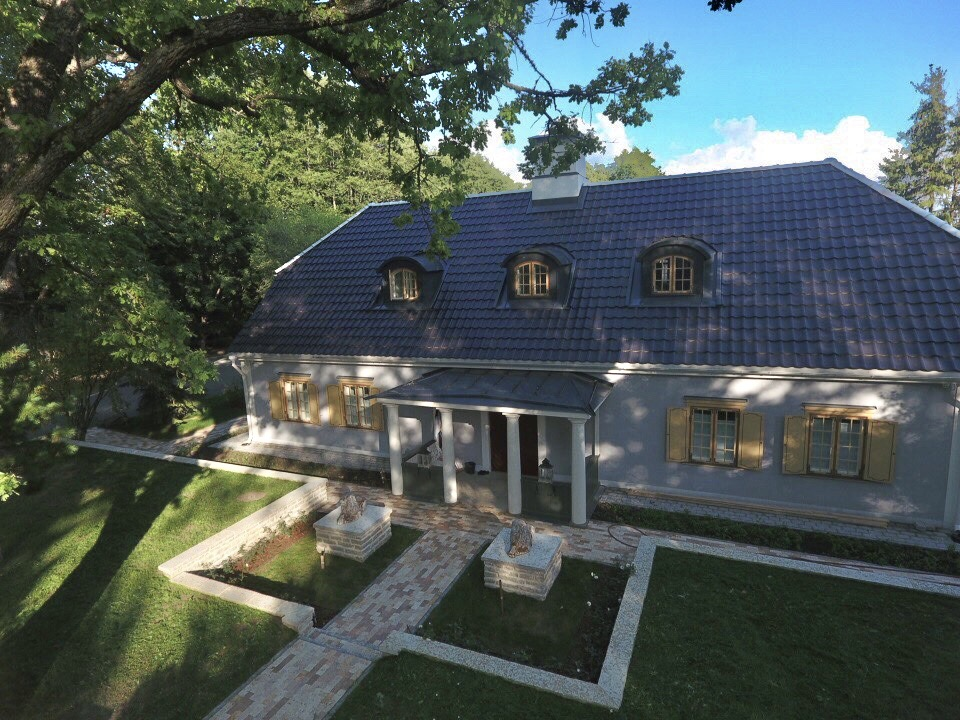
Vana-Pääla Manor on the territory of Suurupi village

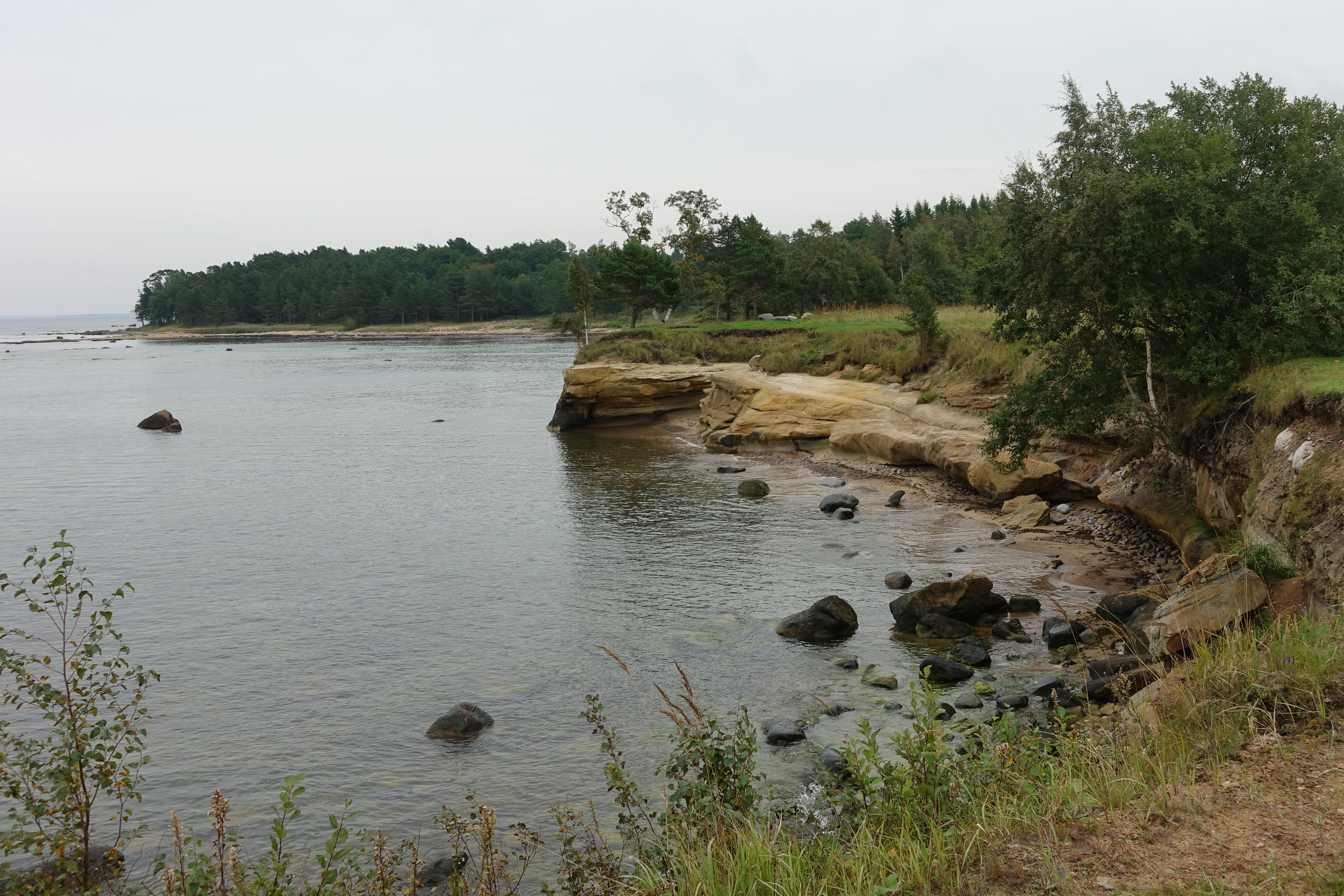
Suurupi beach cliffs

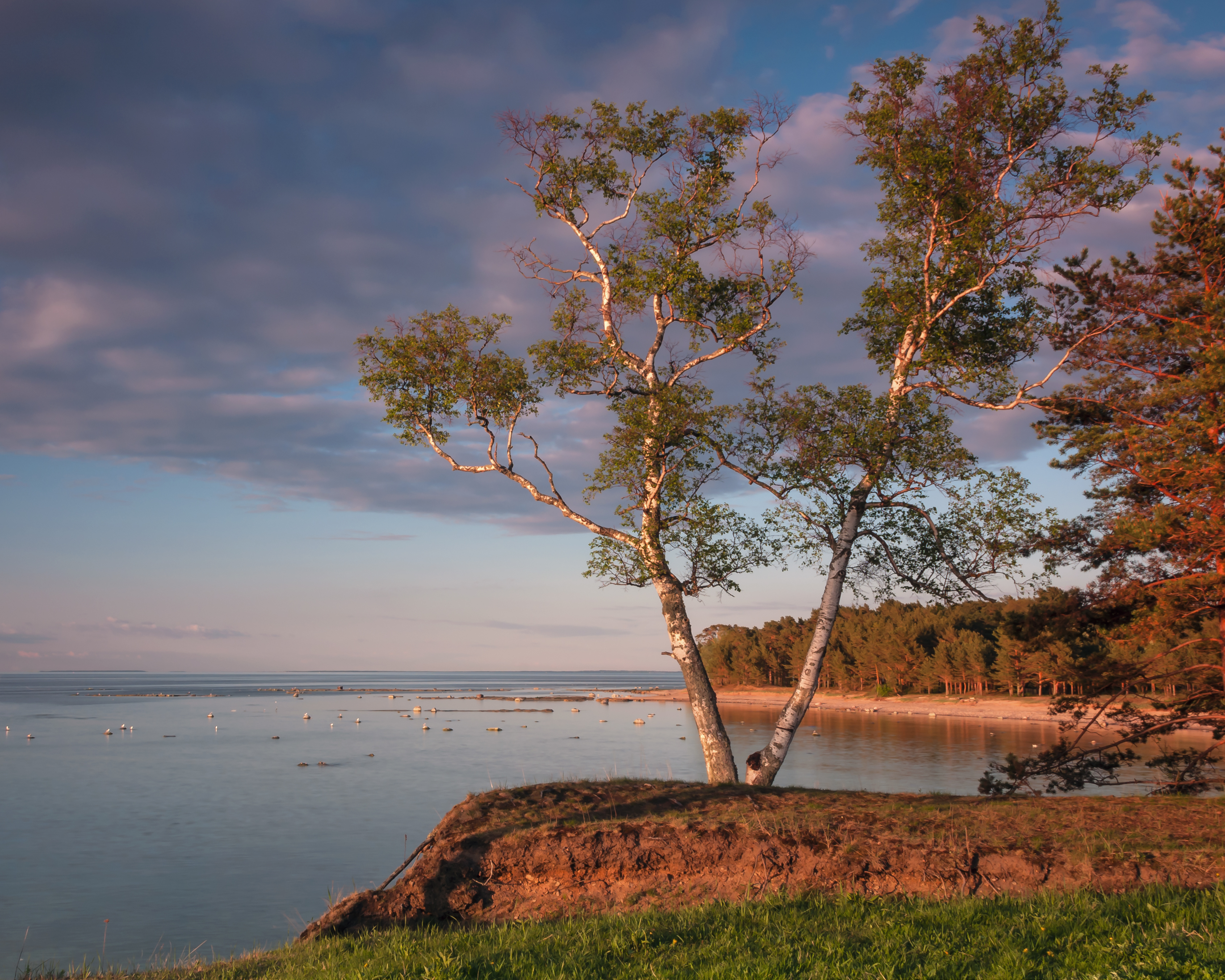
Coastline
