= Kloehn =

Kloehn is a surname. Notable people with the surname include:

- Gregory Kloehn, American artist
- Silas J. Kloehn (1902–1985), American orthodontist
- London Kloehn, American stunt performer
