= Kuusk =

Family name

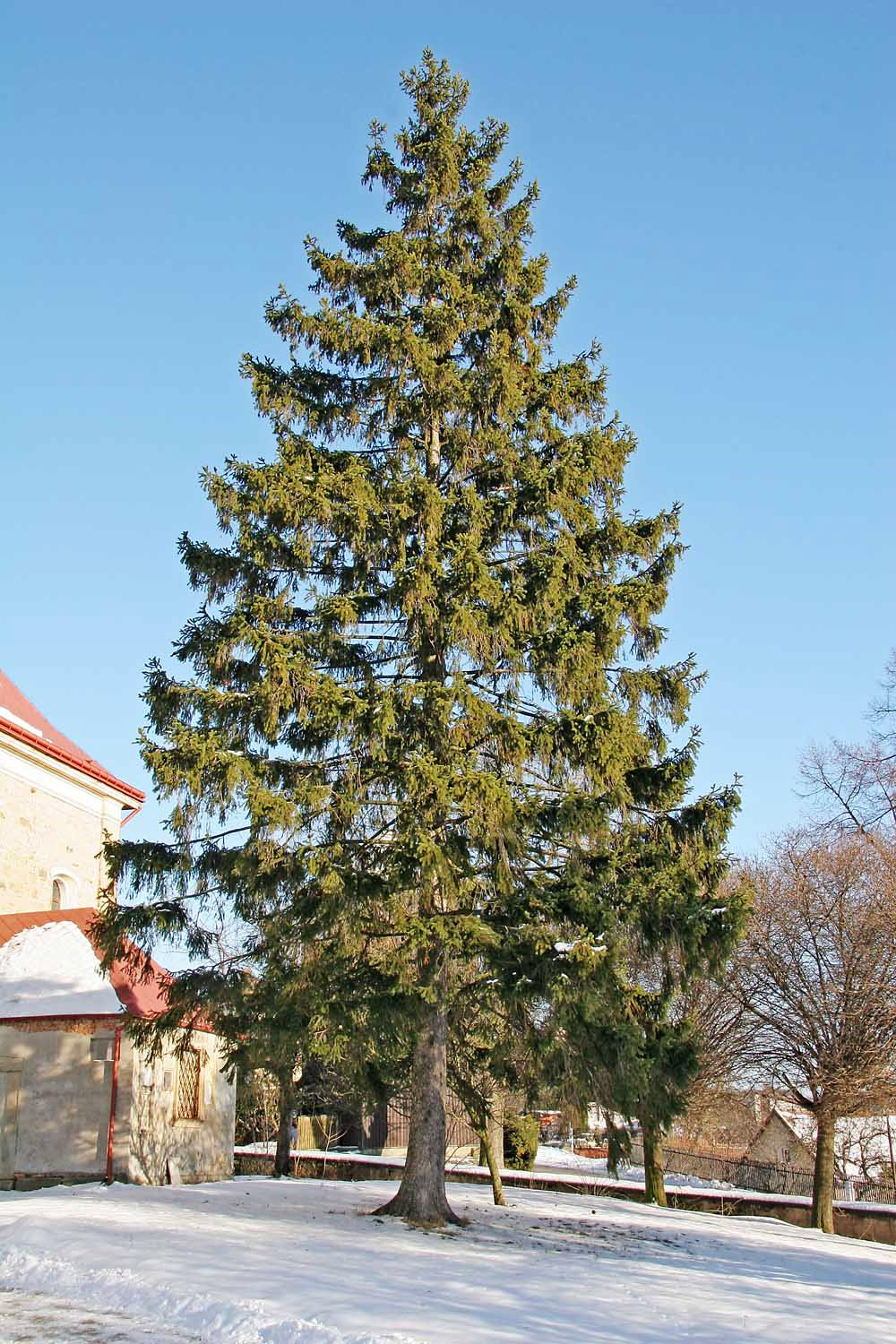

Origin
- Language: Estonian
- Meaning: Spruce
- Region of origin: Estonia

Other names
- Variant form: Spruce

Kuusk is a common surname in Estonia (meaning spruce), and may refer to:

- Ivo Kuusk (born 1937). Estonian opera singer
- Kaimo Kuusk (born 1975), Estonian diplomat and foreign intelligence officer
- Kristina Kuusk (born 1985), Estonian fencer
- Märten Kuusk (born 1996), Estonian footballer
- Priit Kuusk (1938–2022), Estonian music theorist
- Priit Kuusk (born 1973), Estonian journalist :et

== See also ==
- Kuusik
