= Laine Hone =

Estonian translator and philologist (1926–2005)

- Born: August 21, 1926; Tallinn, Estonia
- Died: August 11, 2005 (aged 78)
- Occupations: Translator; philologist

Laine Hone (née Laine Võsamäe, August 21, 1926 – August 11, 2005) was an Estonian translator and philologist.

Laine Hone was born Laine Võsamäe in Tallinn, the daughter of Toomas Võsamäe (né Wohlmann, 1892–1960) and Vilhelmine Marie Võsamäe (née Brikker, 1896–1990). She taught at Tartu High School No. 2 from 1950 to 1956, and was then a lecturer in English at the University of Tartu from 1956 to 1996.

Laine Hone gave birth to the daughter of the English academic and émigré Arthur Robert Hone in 1962. After divorcing his first wife, Aira Kaal, he married Laine Hone in 1964.

== Awards ==
- 1996–1997: University of Tartu medal
- 1997: Order of the White Star, Medal Class
- 2001: Order of the White Star, Fifth Class

== Bibliography ==
- 1966, 1971, 1973: Some Typical Mistakes Occurring in Our Students' Written Papers 1, 2, 3
- 1968: Inglise keele grammatika (with Leopold Kivimägi, Johannes Silvet, and Oleg Mutt)
- 1976: Inglise keele õpetamisest XI klassi katseõpiku järgi (with Amanda Kriit and Dia Virkus)
- 1980: Inglise-eesti sõnastik IX-XI klassile (with Amanda Kriit)
- 1985: "90 aastat Johannes Silveti sünnist," in TRÜ: Tartu Riiklik Ülikool (May 17)
- 1992: Inglise keele harjutustik keskkoolile: 12. klass (with Amanda Kriit and Dia Virkus)
- 2002: Inglise-eesti sõnaraamat / English-Estonian Dictionary (with Aino Jõgi, Ilmar Anvelt, and Amanda Kriit)
