= Stiles Junction, Wisconsin =

Unincorporated area & rail junction in Wisconsin, USA

Stiles Junction, Wisconsin Leighton
- Unincorporated community
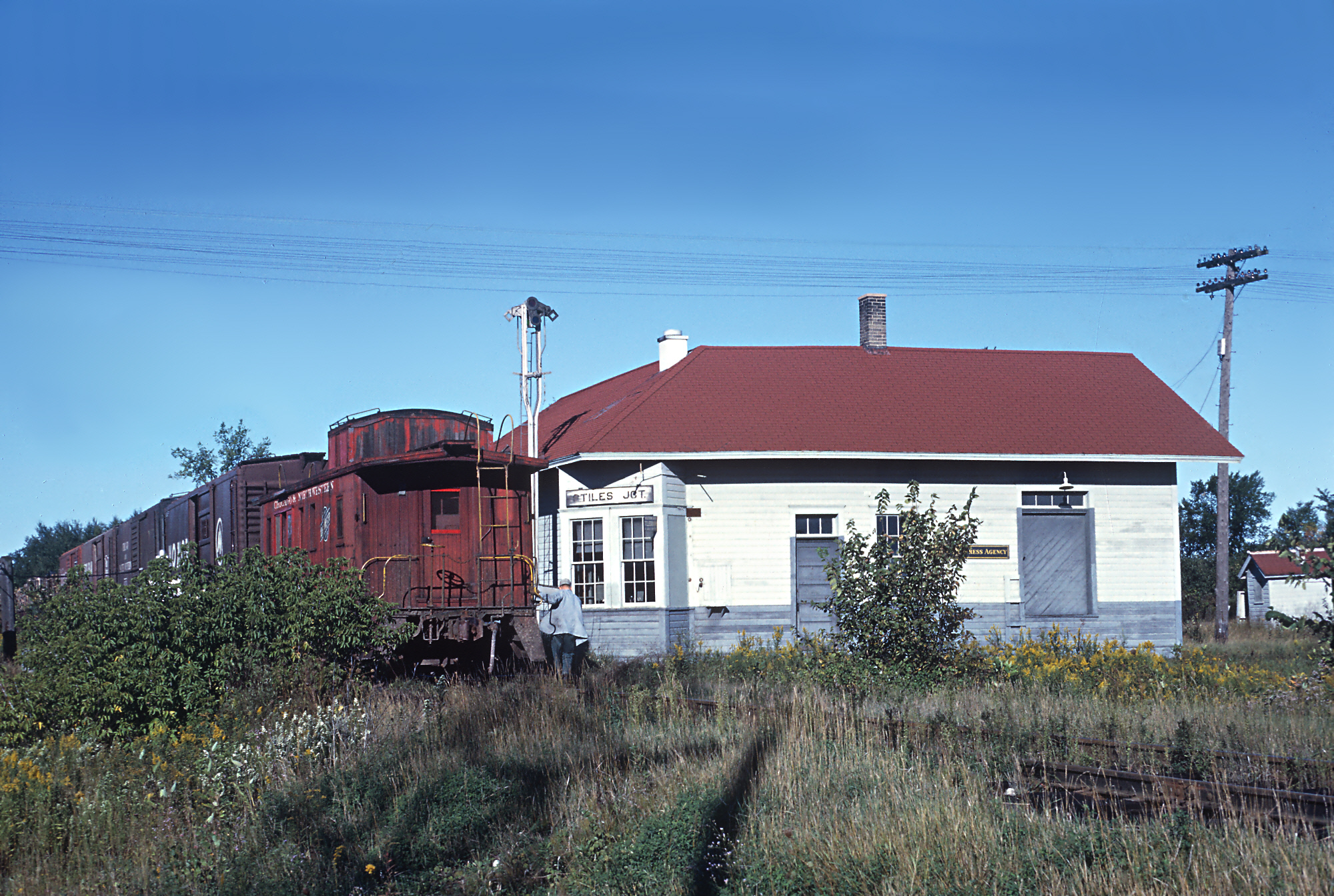
- A Chicago and North Western freight train passes Stiles Junction heading to Oconto Falls. September, 1964.

- Location within Wisconsin
- Coordinates: 44°52′59.9″N 88°02′48.1″W
- Country: United States
- State: Wisconsin
- County: Oconto
- Founded: 1882
- Named for: The junction of two railroads in Stiles, Wi.
- Elevation: 656 ft (200 m)
- Time zone: UTC-6 (Central (CST))
  - Summer (DST): UTC-5 (CDT)
- Area code: 920
- GNIS feature ID: 1577839
- Website: townofstiles.org

Stiles Junction is an unincorporated community located in the town of Stiles, Oconto County, Wisconsin, United States.

== Early history - Leighton ==
Originally known as Leighton this area of Stiles was settled by John Leigh, a native of Ireland along the Little River in the late 1860s. The family operated a small sawmill (and later a grist mill) here into the 1880s. In 1887 this sawmill in Leighton was destroyed in a fire. Native Americans were a common sight in Stiles and Leighton as one of their burial grounds was located in Leighton.

The John Leigh settlement in Leighton, Wisconsin was located approximately 1.4 mile east of the Stiles Junction station on County Highway 22 near the Little River. A post office was established in 1882, and it remained in operation for 4 years before being discontinued in 1886.

The first white female born in Oconto County, Effie A. Leigh, was born in the community of Leighton on July 25, 1851. The Stiles Junction school, originally called the Leigh Town School, was located in Leighton.

In August 1886, a forest fire that had been raging in the county burnt down a local farmer's barn. The entire settlement of Leighton was in great danger of being destroyed. Luckily, everyone had escaped. In total, 2 barns, five tons of hay, and 2 hogs were destroyed/killed in the fire.

== Stiles Junction ==
The Stiles Junction name came to be with a diamond crossing between an east–west line of the C&NW's predecessor Milwaukee, Lake Shore and Western Railway line (1883) (that was built to Clintonville from Oconto) and the north–south Milwaukee Road.

After the second railroad came into this area of Stiles, the community surrounding the railroad station (Note: In North America, the terms "depot" and "station" have historically been interchangeable for such structures.) soon began using "Stiles Junction" as the more commonly used name. Leighton was formally renamed Stiles Junction ca. 1882.

== Geography ==
Stiles Junction is located at a diamond crossing between an east–west line of the Chicago and North Western Railway (C&NW) crossing of the north–south Milwaukee Road. Nearby is the crossroads of U.S. Highway 141 and Wisconsin State Highway 22. Stiles Junction, Wi is located at 44°52′59.9″N 88°02′48.1″W

By 1887 there were several hotels, saloons and other shops established in proximity to Stiles Junction. A piece in the October 19, 1991 Green Bay Press-Gazette list the Stiles Junction population as 40.

The abandoned rail bed to the east is now the Oconto River State Trail, with a trailhead on Military Road adjacent to Stiles Junction.

== Railroad ==
The pre-existing Milwaukee Road's line (December 30, 1882) connected Milwaukee and the Upper Peninsula of Michigan. The shared station that was built in 1881 and has recently collapsed and been removed.

The C&NW in 1899 built a 2.4 mile branch line to a sawmill and planing mill in Stiles and later removed it in 1932. The C&NW rail line eastward from the junction to Oconto, Wisconsin is now abandoned.

=== Stiles Junction Union Depot ===
The Stiles Union depot, combining a freight warehouse, a ticket office and passenger waiting room, was built in the north west angle of the crossing, facing both the Milwaukee & Northern and C&NW tracks. Stiles Junction depot is a 'sister' to the Milwaukee Road's Forest Junction, WI depot as they share the same architectural plan. This depot succumbed to a structural collapse in the late 2010s, date unrecorded.

=== Historic services ===
By the late 1960s, with few riders remaining and the US Postal rail contracts ended, the Milwaukee Road (and most other big RRs) discontinued many of their long-distance trains. After these passenger services ended, the Stiles Junction station continued to be used as a train order office for both of the railroads. Stiles Junction depot is a 'sister' to the Milwaukee Road's Forest Junction, WI depot as they share the same architectural plan.

- Chippewa was discontinued on February 2, 1960.
- Copper Country Limited made its last runs on March 7, 1968.

=== Oconto Falls branch ===
The middle portion of the line from Gillett, Wi to Oconto, Wi was the only intact section of the C&NW line remaining by the 1990s. The Escanaba and Lake Superior Railroad bought the 4.7 mile branch line from the C&NW on April 20, 1995. This 5-mile line westward from Stiles Junction to Oconto Falls, serves a Lumber yard, a distribution warehouse, a paper company, and a co-op grain storage facility. A passenger station was located east of Cherry Avenue, on the north side of the tracks. The 'connection' to the branch is via an inverted Y track.

The C&NW line from Gillett to just outside Oconto Falls was allowed to be abandoned by the ICC in 1979 with the last train run on June 29, 1979. The C&NW line eastward from Stiles Junction to Oconto, was abandoned on December 3, 1996.

== See also ==
- Leighton, Wisconsin
