= Kuusiku (disambiguation) =

Kuusiku may refer to several places in Estonia:

- Kuusiku, small borough in Rapla Parish, Rapla County
- Kuusiku, Hiiu County, village in Hiiumaa Parish, Hiiu County
- Kuusiku, Saare County, village in Saaremaa Parish, Saare County
- Kuusiku, Tartu County, village in Peipsiääre Parish, Tartu County
- Pidula-Kuusiku, village in Saaremaa Parish, Saare County, known as Kuusiku until 2017 when located in Kihelkonna Parish

== See also ==
- Kuusik
