= Leighton, Wisconsin =

Ghost town in Wisconsin

Coordinates: 44.888°N 88.011°W

Leighton is a ghost town in Stiles Junction, Oconto County, Wisconsin. The community and settlement of Leighton was named for the John Leigh family who settled in the area along the Little River in the late 1860s and operated a small sawmill there into the 1880s. As in the case of many such settlements, the railroad's station name soon became the commonly used term and Leighton was renamed Stiles Junction ca. 1882.

Leighton was located approximately 1.4 mile east of Stiles Junction on County Highway 22 by the Little River Bridge. The community established a post office in 1882 and it remained in operation for 4 years before being discontinued in 1886.

The community most likely became a ghost town in the early 1910s.

== History of Leighton ==
The community was near the Milwaukee, Lake Shore & Western railway, built in late 1879. The first white female born in Oconto County, Effie A. Leigh, was born in the community of Leighton on July 25, 1851. John Leigh, the original proprietor of Leighton, was a native of Ireland. The Stiles Junction school, originally called the Leigh Town School before the settlement became abandoned, was located in Leighton.

The community was most likely originally settled in the present day location of Stiles Junction. Native Americans were a common sight in Stiles and Leighton. A burial ground for Native Americans was put in Leighton.

In August 1886, a forest fire that had been raging in the county burnt down a local farmer's barn. The entire settlement of Leighton was in great danger of being destroyed. Luckily, everyone had escaped. In total, 2 barns, five tons of hay, and 2 hogs were destroyed/killed in the fire. In 1887, the sawmill in Leighton owned by John Leigh was destroyed in a fire.
