= Aino Jõgi =

Estonian translator (1922–2013)

- Born: October 2, 1922; Abja, Estonia
- Died: January 15, 2013 (aged 90)
- Occupations: Linguist and translator

Aino Jõgi (née Aino Nõmm; October 2, 1922 – January 15, 2013) was an Estonian linguist, emeritus associate professor of English philology at the University of Tartu, and translator.

== Family ==
Aino Jõgi was born in Abja, Estonia, the daughter of Jaan Nõmm (né Rosenblatt, 1880–1947) and Leena Nõmm (née Kangur, 1897–1987), and she grew up on a farm in the Mulgimaa region. She married Aksel Jõgi (1925–2003).

== Education ==
In 1941, Jõgi graduated from the Viljandi Estonian Education Society's private high school for girls, and from 1945 to 1950 she studied English philology at the University of Tartu. In 1971, she defended her philology thesis Inglise päritolu sõnad eesti keeles (Words of English Origin in Estonian).

== Career ==
After graduating, Jõgi was a lecturer at the University of Tartu, where she worked until her retirement in 1992. She taught lexicology and English as a main subject and prepared teaching materials. She was one of the authors of Inglise-eesti sõnaraamat / English-Estonian Dictionary, published by Koolibri in 2002 (coauthored with Laine Hone, Amanda Kriit, and Ilmar Anvelt).

Jõgi translated fairy tales and children's books from Estonian to English, as well as Oskar Luts's Kevade (Spring; co-translator Melanie Rauk). She translated fiction and documentaries from English to Estonian (mainly for the Olion publishing house), such as the works of Arnold Bennett, Charlotte Brontë, and Mary Stewart.

== Bibliography ==
- 1959: Texts for Biologists (Tartu: Tartu State University)
- 1960: Texts for Mathematicians (Tartu: Tartu State University)
- 1963: Texts for Geographers (Tartu: Tartu State University)
- 1971: "Inglise laenude häälikja kirjakuju muganemine," in Keel ja kirjandus 14: 80
- 1971: Слова английского происхождения в эстонском языке (Tartu: Tartu State University)
- 1974: Texts for Defectologists (Tartu: Tartu State University)
- 1977: On Field Approach in Linguistics
- 1981: Three Short Stories with Exercises (Tartu: Tartu State University)
- 1983: English Loanwords in Estonian (Jyväskylä)
- 1989: "Inglise keele mõjust väliseesti ilukirjanduse sõnavarale ja sõnakasutusele," in Keel ja kirjandus 32(11): 649
- 1991: "Inglise keele interferentsist välis-eesti ilu- ja ajakirjanduskeele grammatikas," in Keel ja kirjandus 34(2): 81
- 2002: Inglise-eesti sõnaraamat / English-Estonian Dictionary (Tallinn: Koolibri; with Ilmar Anvelt, and Amanda Kriit, and Laine Hone)
- 2014: Inglise päritolu sõnad eesti keeles (Tallinn: Eesti Keele Sihtasutus; with Urmas Sutrop)
