= Milton McDougal =

American politician and farmer

Milton Thomas McDougal (July 21, 1917 – April 2, 1984) was an American politician and farmer.

Born in Spruce, Wisconsin, McDougal was a farmer and livestock dealer. He was also involved in the electric cooperative. He served in the Wisconsin State Assembly from 1965 until 1972. He was elected as a Democrat. However, during the Wisconsin Legislature session of 1967, McDougal switched to the Republican Party. McDougal lived in Oconto Falls, Wisconsin.
