= Brillion (town), Wisconsin =

Town in Calumet County, Wisconsin

Coordinates: 44°12′17″N 88°06′47″W

Brillion
- Town
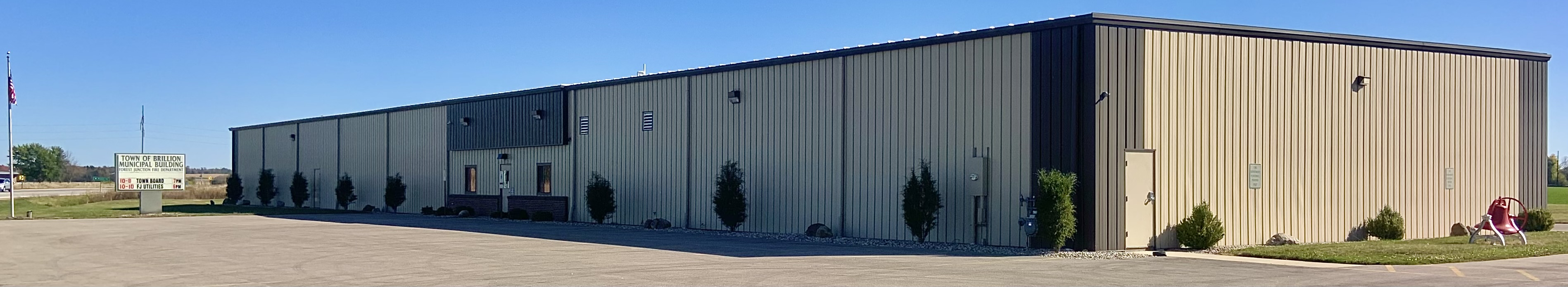
- Brillion Town Hall near Forest Junction

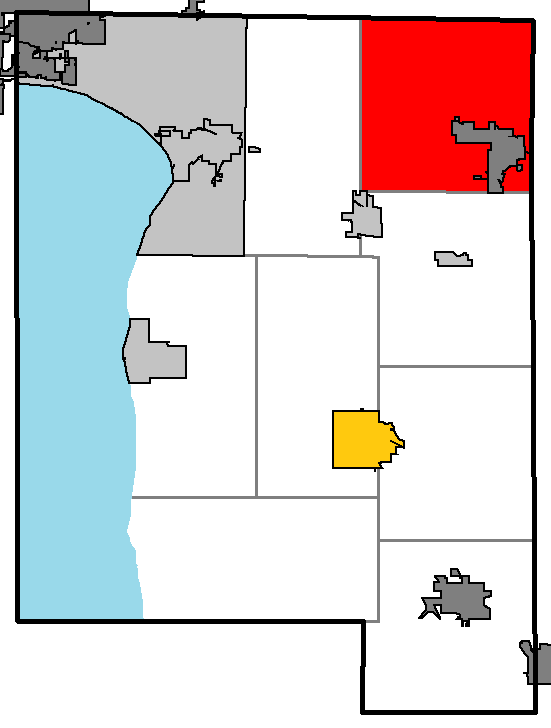
- Country: United States
- State: Wisconsin
- County: Calumet County

Area
  - Total: 33.2 sq mi (86.0 km^{2})
  - Land: 33.1 sq mi (85.6 km^{2})
  - Water: 0.12 sq mi (0.3 km^{2}) 0.40%

Population (2020)
  - Total: 1,650
  - Density: 49.9/sq mi (19.3/km^{2})
- (Up from 1,486 at 2010 census)
- Time zone: UTC-6 (Central)
  - Summer (DST): UTC-5 (CDT)
- Website: https://townofbrillionwi.gov/

Brillion is a town in Calumet County in the U.S. state of Wisconsin. The population was 1,650 at the 2020 census, up from 1,486 at the 2010 census.

== Geography ==
The Town of Brillion is located in the northeast corner of Calumet County and is bordered by Brown County to the north and Manitowoc County to the east. The city of Brillion, a separate municipality, is in the southeast part of the town, while the unincorporated Forest Junction is in the northwest.

According to the United States Census Bureau, the town has a total area of 33.2 square miles (86.0 km^{2}), of which 33.1 square miles (85.6 km^{2}) is land and 0.12 square miles (0.3 km^{2}), or 0.40%, is water.

== Demographics ==
As of the census of 2000, there were 1,438 people, 501 households, and 383 families residing in the town. The population density was 43.2 people per square mile (16.7/km^{2}). There were 521 housing units at an average density of 15.7 per square mile (6.0/km^{2}). The racial makeup of the town was 97.98% White, 0.42% Black or African American, 0.42% Native American, 0.14% Asian, 0.28% from other races, and 0.76% from two or more races. 0.70% of the population were Hispanic or Latino of any race.

There were 501 households, out of which 40.1% had children under the age of 18 living with them, 68.1% were married couples living together, 4.8% had a female householder with no husband present, and 23.4% were non-families. 18.0% of all households were made up of individuals, and 5.8% had someone living alone who was 65 years of age or older. The average household size was 2.87 and the average family size was 3.32.

In the town, the population was spread out, with 29.6% under the age of 18, 7.4% from 18 to 24, 32.2% from 25 to 44, 20.7% from 45 to 64, and 10.1% who were 65 years of age or older. The median age was 35 years. For every 100 females, there were 103.1 males. For every 100 females age 18 and over, there were 107.0 males.

The median income for a household in the town was $52,500, and the median income for a family was $58,403. Males had a median income of $38,636 versus $22,500 for females. The per capita income for the town was $21,927. About 1.8% of families and 2.6% of the population were below the poverty line, including 3.8% of those under age 18 and none of those age 65 or over.
