= Arthur Robert Hone =

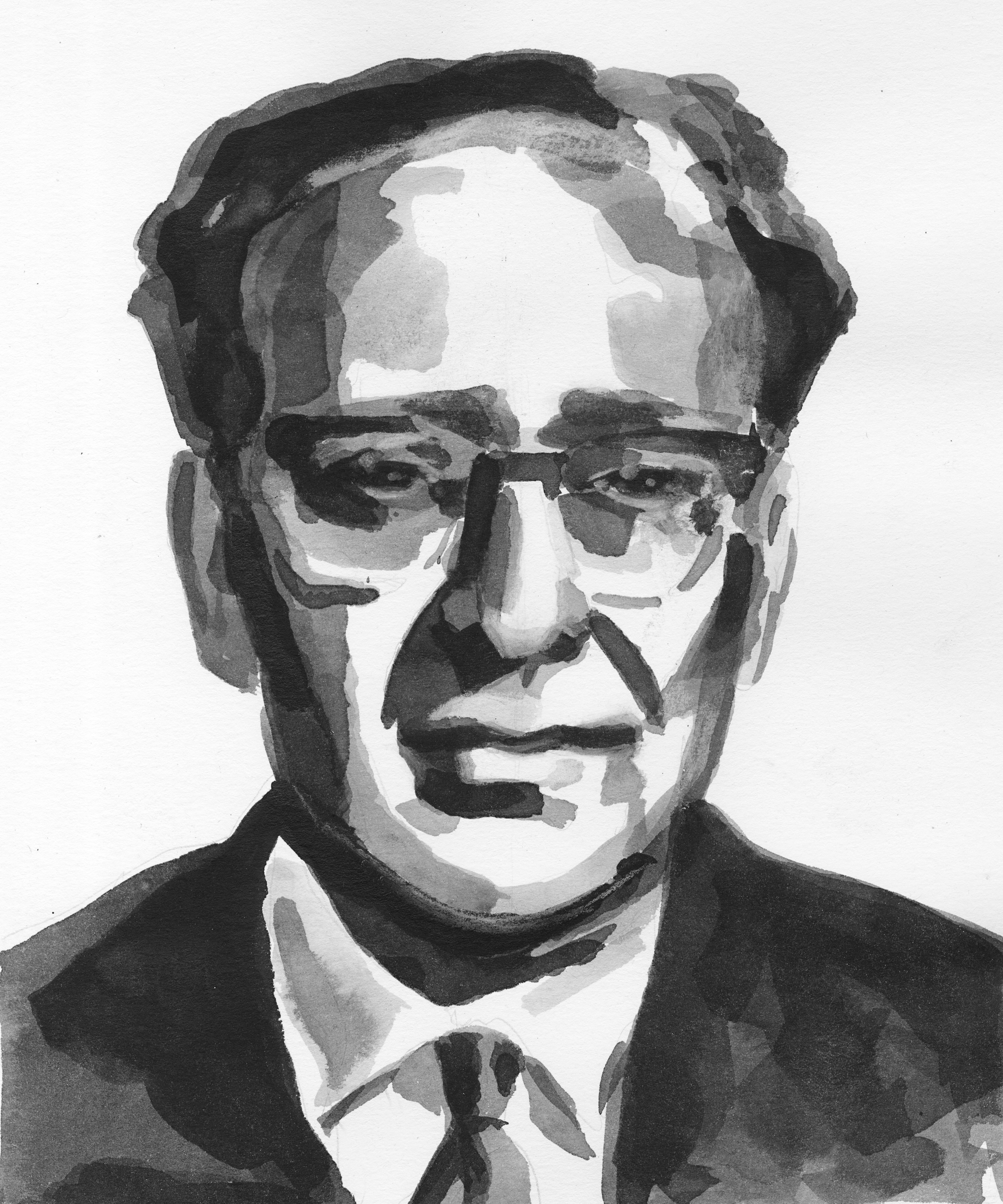
- Born: 18 February 1915; London, United Kingdom
- Died: 9 June 1972 (aged 57); Tartu, Estonia
- Spouse(s): Aira Kaal; Laine Hone

Academic background
- Education: University of Cambridge

Academic work
- Institutions: Tartu State University
- Main interests: Language education, literature

Arthur Robert Hone (18 February 1915 – 9 June 1972) was an English academic and émigré to the Soviet Union who lived the majority of his life in Estonia. Having studied Modern and Medieval Languages at St John's College, Cambridge, and became a member of the Communist Party of Great Britain, he met his future wife Aira Kaal in 1938 and returned to Estonia with her shortly before World War II. From 1940 to 1941, he lectured at Tartu State University, and during the war worked in a factory and as a librarian in Chelyabinsk, Russia. After the war ended, he again returned to Estonia and resumed lecturing full time at Tartu State University, teaching the subjects of English, French, Spanish, Italian, and literature. Hone died in Tartu in 1972 at the age of 57. At the time of his death, he was the only foreign citizen who was a permanent resident in the city of Tartu.
