= Kiuma =

Village in Estonia

Coordinates: 58°02′N 26°58′E

- Village
- Interactive map of Kiuma
- Country: Estonia
- County: Põlva County
- Parish: Põlva Parish
- Time zone: UTC+2 (EET)
  - Summer (DST): UTC+3 (EEST)

Kiuma (German: Kioma) is a village in Põlva Parish, Põlva County in southeastern Estonia.

== Notable people ==
Notable people that were born or lived in Kiuma include the following:

- Heino Liiv (1930–2021), linguist and philologist
