= Johannes Silvet =

Estonian linguist and lexicographer (1895–1979)

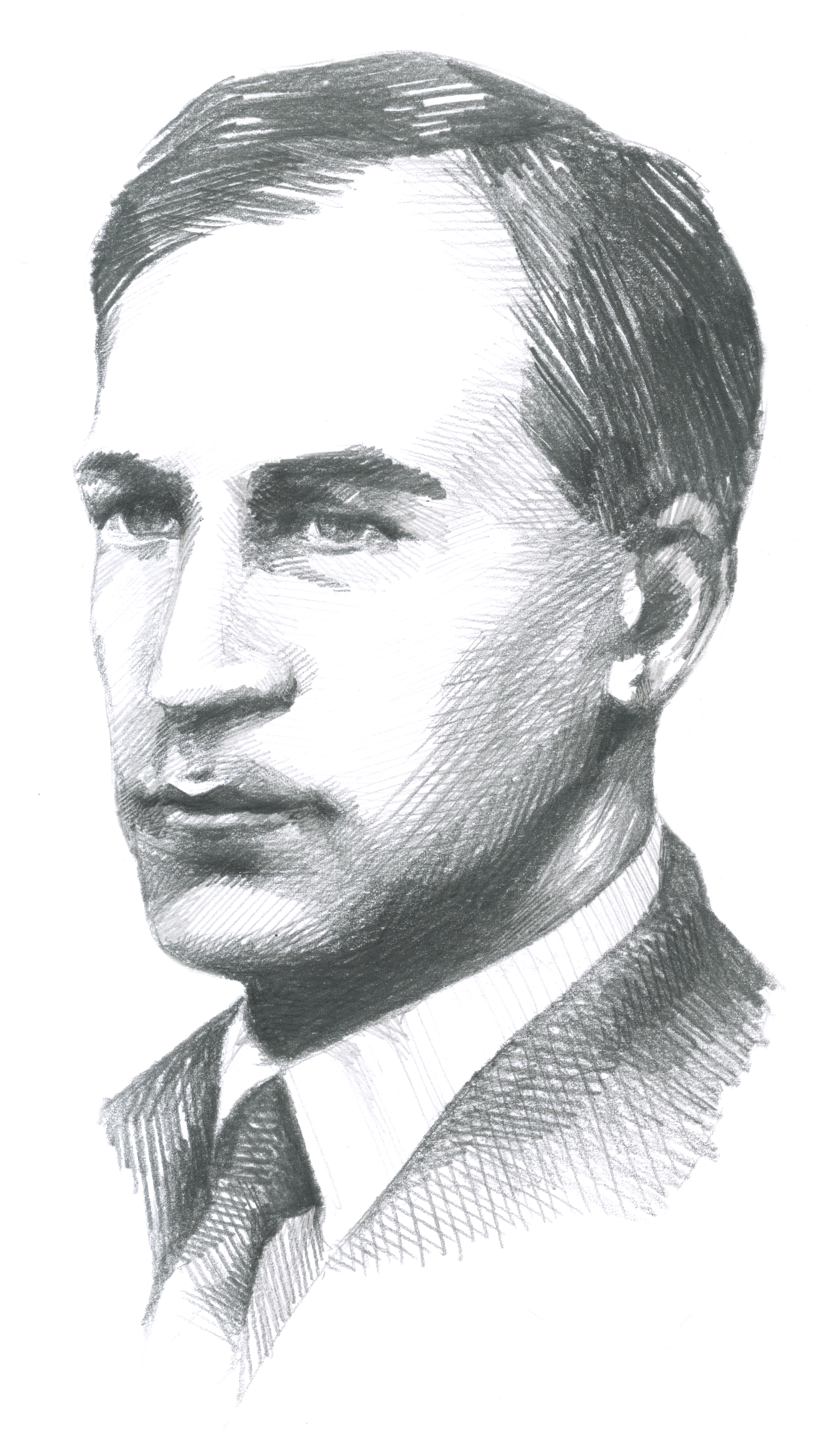
- Born: May 12, 1895; Tartu, Governorate of Livonia, Russian Empire
- Died: February 17, 1979 (aged 83); Elva, then part of Estonian SSR, Soviet Union
- Resting place: Elva Cemetery
- Occupation: Lexicographer

Johannes Silvet (until 1929 Johannes Schwalbe; May 12, 1895 – February 17, 1979) was an Estonian linguist and lexicographer.

== Life ==
Silvet was born in Tartu, at that time in the Governorate of Livonia, Russian Empire (now Estonia). He studied at the University of Tartu from 1921 to 1925, and in 1925 he received a master's degree in philology with the thesis The Development of Milton's Blank Verse. He worked as an associate professor at the University of Tartu, and he compiled dictionaries.

Silvet died in Elva, Estonia, and he is buried in the town cemetery.

== Bibliography ==
- 1926: "Kaks juubilari," Looming 3(10)
- 1927: "John Galsworthy," Looming 4(6)
- 1928: "Sulesõda kuningas mammona vastu," Looming 5(4)
- 1965: Eesti-inglise sõnaraamat
- 1968: Inglise keele grammatika (with Leopold Kivimägi, Laine Hone, and Oleg Mutt)
- 1979: Võõrsõnade leksikon (with Richard Kleis and Eduard Vääri)
