= Spruce (disambiguation) =

Spruce are trees in the genus Picea.

Spruce may also refer to:

== Places ==
In the United States:

- Spruce, Michigan, an unincorporated community
- Spruce, Dickinson County, Michigan, former train depot
- Spruce, Missouri
- Spruce, Wisconsin, a town
  - Spruce (community), Wisconsin, an unincorporated community
- Spruce Township, Minnesota

== People ==
- Andy Spruce (born 1954), Canadian ice hockey player
- Edward Caldwell Spruce (1865–1922), English sculptor
- Everett Spruce (1908–2002), American painter
- George Spruce (1923–1998), English professional football player
- Nelson Spruce (born 1992), American football player
- Richard Spruce (1817–1893), English botanist and explorer
- Stuart Spruce (born 1971), English rugby league player
- Tabitha Spruce (born 1949), American author

== Businesses ==
- Spruce (restaurant), a restaurant in San Francisco, California

== Media ==
- The Spruce, a website about home and food, published by Dotdash Meredith
