= The Cavemen Chronicle =

2012 Estonian novel

- First edition (Estonian)
- Author: Mihkel Mutt
- Language: English
- Genre: Fiction
- Publisher: Fabian; Dalkey Archive Press (2015)
- Publication date: 2012
- Publication place: Estonian literature
- Media type: Print (paperback)
- Pages: 401
- Awards: Virumaa Literature Prize
- ISBN: 978-1-56478-708-8

The Cavemen Chronicle (Estonian title Kooparahvas läheb ajalukku) is a 2012 historical/comic novel by Estonian author Mihkel Mutt. An English language translation by Adam Cullen was published in 2015. The novel centers on a group of writers, musicians, and scholars in Estonia before, during, and after that nation's independence from the Soviet Union. The title refers to The Cave, a semi-exclusive underground bar in Tallinn where the principal characters gather to drink and debate over the course of several decades.

== Plot and summary ==
"The Cavemen Chronicle" explores recent Estonian history, from the era of Soviet repression to Estonian independence and beyond, through the eyes of a group of intellectuals whose stories intersect and diverge and whose lives, in the narrator's words, "expressed the age."

The novel is divided into four main chronological sections:

- "The Old Age," set in the 1960s and 1970s and chronicling the childhood and early adulthood of the protagonists.
- "The Middle Ages," set in the 1980s and introducing The Cave, the underground pub where the major characters and many minor ones gather on a regular basis to discuss their lives, debate philosophy, and comment on the state of the world.
- "The New Era," a short section centered around the creation of the Independent Republic of Estonia between 1988 and 1991.
- "The Newest Age," spanning the 1990s and early 2000s, as the characters adjust to a life in which freedom of expression is celebrated but economic security has been greatly reduced.

Major characters include:

- Teedu Tärn, a university lecturer who early on decides that working within the Soviet system is the best course and, with the coming of independence, must grapple with that choice.
- Mati Tõusumägi, a magazine editor who delights in publishing subversive ideas disguised as cultural commentary, is expelled from the university, and eventually becomes a leader of the Estonian independence movement.
- Juhan "Juku" Raudtuvi, the book's narrator, a Persian translator who ends up working as a gossip columnist.
- Klaus, an artist, poet, and actor who eventually becomes famous as a musician and independence advocate.
- Manglus, a charismatic, hard-partying artist who rises to become Minister of Culture in the new republic.
- Pekka, a Finnish poet who works as a tour guide and gives the Estonians a glimpse of the economic pressures of a market economy.
- Illimar, an autistic savant whose correspondence with Juku over several decades reflects his descent into dementia.

By the end of the novel, several characters have died and others still struggle to adapt to a world where their Soviet-era identities have been subsumed by a new state, a market economy, and constant technological change. As Mutt stated in a 2018 interview:

"Back in the Soviet era everyone knew who you were, they knew your face. It was an age with no mass media, and to be a writer was to be a celebrity in an age of no celebrity. ... The numbers for some of the books I published in the 1980s were astonishing—40,000 copies sold, a million people or more reading my work. But I'm still suspicious of these numbers, which seemed unlikely then and, frankly, impossible to conceive of today."

== Historical references ==
"The Cavemen Chronicle" is set firmly within the historical context of the last half-century in Estonia, but major events of the period are often mentioned briefly, if at all.

One exception is the Estonian Song Festival of September 1988 (the novel places the event in August), which comprises much of the third section of the book. The event, organized by opponents of the Soviet occupation, attracted more than 100,000 people to the Song Festival Grounds outside Tallinn, where traditional and patriotic Estonian songs were performed in defiance of Soviet prohibitions. The moment is considered one of the landmarks of civil disobedience during the Baltics uprising. In the novel, however, the event is used in part for comedic effect, as the principal characters spend several pages debating whether to go to the festival grounds and perhaps witness history in the making, or alternatively to stay away, continue drinking, and merely lie to everyone later by claiming they had, in fact, been at the event.

Some reviews have suggested that Mutt's novel is highly autobiographical and that many of the characters are based on real-life individuals. At least one, Estonian author and theater director Mati Unt, appears as himself.

The Cave, the tavern around which most of the book's plot revolves, is based on an actual underground nightclub in Tallinn, the KuKu Club.

== Awards ==
"The Cavemen Chronicle" won the Virumaa Literature Prize for the best historical novel in 2013.
