= Paul-Eduard Luiga =

Estonian politician

Paul-Eduard Luiga (15 May 1875 in Vana-Kuuste Parish (now Kambja Parish), Kreis Dorpat – 15 November 1941 in Sverdlovsk Oblast, Russia) was an Estonian politician. He was a member of II Riigikogu. He was a member of the Riigikogu since 10 March 1924. He replaced Victor Mutt.
