= Victor Mutt =

Estonian military personnel

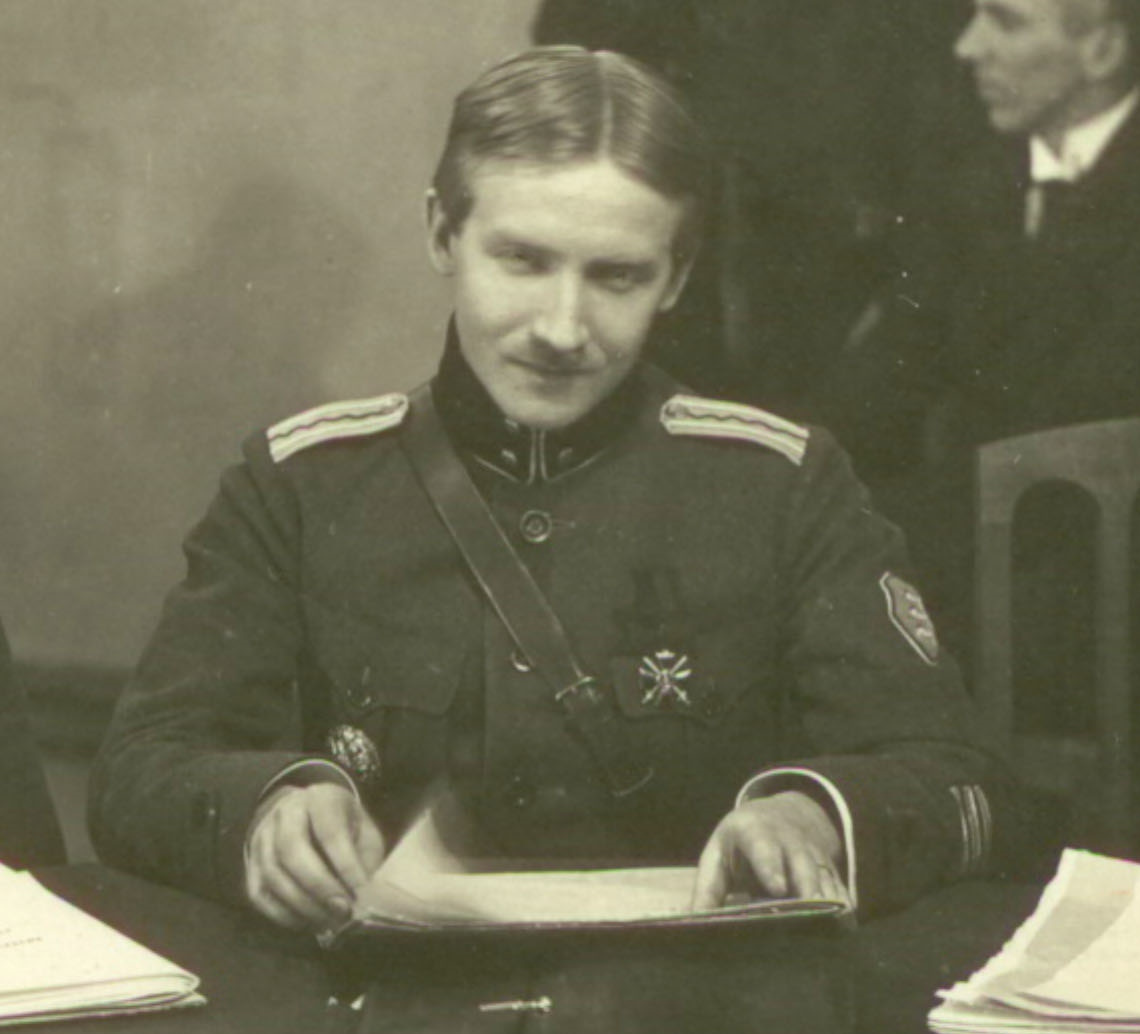
Victor Mutt at the conclusion of the Treaty of Tartu, 1920

Victor Johann Mutt (also Viktor Johann Mutt; 25 May 1886 Tuhalaane Parish (now Mulgi Parish), Kreis Fellin – 30 April 1942 Kirov Prison, Russian SFSR) was an Estonian military colonel, diplomat and politician. He was a member of II Riigikogu. On 10 March 1924, he resigned his position and he was replaced by Paul-Eduard Luiga. Mutt was arrested by the NKVD on 30 June 1940 and sentenced to death. He was executed in Kirov Prison in 1942.

Mutt's sons were the chemist Viktor Mutt and linguist and translator Oleg Mutt and his grandson is the writer Mihkel Mutt.
