= Oleg Mutt =

Estonian linguist and translator (1920–1986)

- Born: May 6, 1920; Tartu, Estonia
- Died: February 19, 1986 (aged 65); Tartu, then part of Estonian SSR, Soviet Union
- Occupations: Linguist and translator

Oleg Lembit Mutt (May 6, 1920 Tartu – February 19, 1986) was an Estonian linguist and translator.

== Early life and family ==
Oleg Mutt was born in Tartu, Estonia. He spent his childhood years in New York City. He was the son of Victor Mutt, an Estonian soldier and diplomat, and the father of the Estonian writer Mihkel Mutt. His brother was the Swedish biochemist Viktor Mutt.

== Education and career ==
Mutt graduated from the University of Tartu in 1948 and became a professor of English philology there that same year. From 1948 to 1949 he was a lecturer in the Department of Western European Languages, from 1949 to 1953 a senior lecturer, from 1953 to 1961 a senior lecturer in the Department of Foreign Languages, from 1961 to 1986 a lecturer in the Department of English (since 1972 English Philology), from 1961 to 1963 a senior lecturer, and from 1963 onward an associate professor. He headed the Department of English Philology until 1978, when he was succeeded by Heino Liiv.

Oleg Mutt died in Tartu in 1986 and was buried at Old St. John's Cemetery.

== Bibliography ==
- 1963: Selections from Old, Middle and Early Modern English (Tartu: Tartu Riiklik Ülikool)
- 1968: Inglise keele grammatika (with Leopold Kivimägi, Laine Hone, and Johannes Silvet) (Tallinn: Valgus)
- 1970: "Keeleline vastuvoetavus ja selle uurimine," Keel ja Kirjandus 13: 521
- 1972: "Võõrkeelte olevikust ja tulevikust," TRÜ: Tartu Riiklik Ülikool January 21: 2
- 1973: A Short Introduction to Germanic Philology for the Student of English (Tartu: Tartu Riiklik Ülikool)
- 1975: "Leksikograafia vanameistri juubel. Johannes Silvet 80," Keel ja Kirjandus 5: 318–319
- 1975: Ten Facets of English: Ten Selected Lectures on the English Language (Tartu: Tartu Riiklik Ülikool)
- 1976: American Life and Institutions (Tartu: Tartu Riiklik Ülikool)
- 1976: "Muljeid suvisest Inglismaast," TRÜ: Tartu Riiklik Ülikool October 15: 2
- 1979: "Johannes Silvet 12. V 1895—17. II 1979," TRÜ: Tartu Riiklik Ülikool February 23: 4
- 1979: An Outline of Early Modern English (Tartu: Tartu Riiklik Ülikool)
- 1980: "Heino Liiv 50," TRÜ: Tartu Riiklik Ülikool September 5: 2
- 1982: The Development of English Language Studies in the 16th–20th Centuries (Tartu: Tartu Riiklik Ülikool)
- 1982: Social and Regional Varieties of Present-Day English (Tartu: Tartu Riiklik Ülikool)
