= Forest Junction, Wisconsin =

Census-designated place in Wisconsin, United States

- Census-designated place
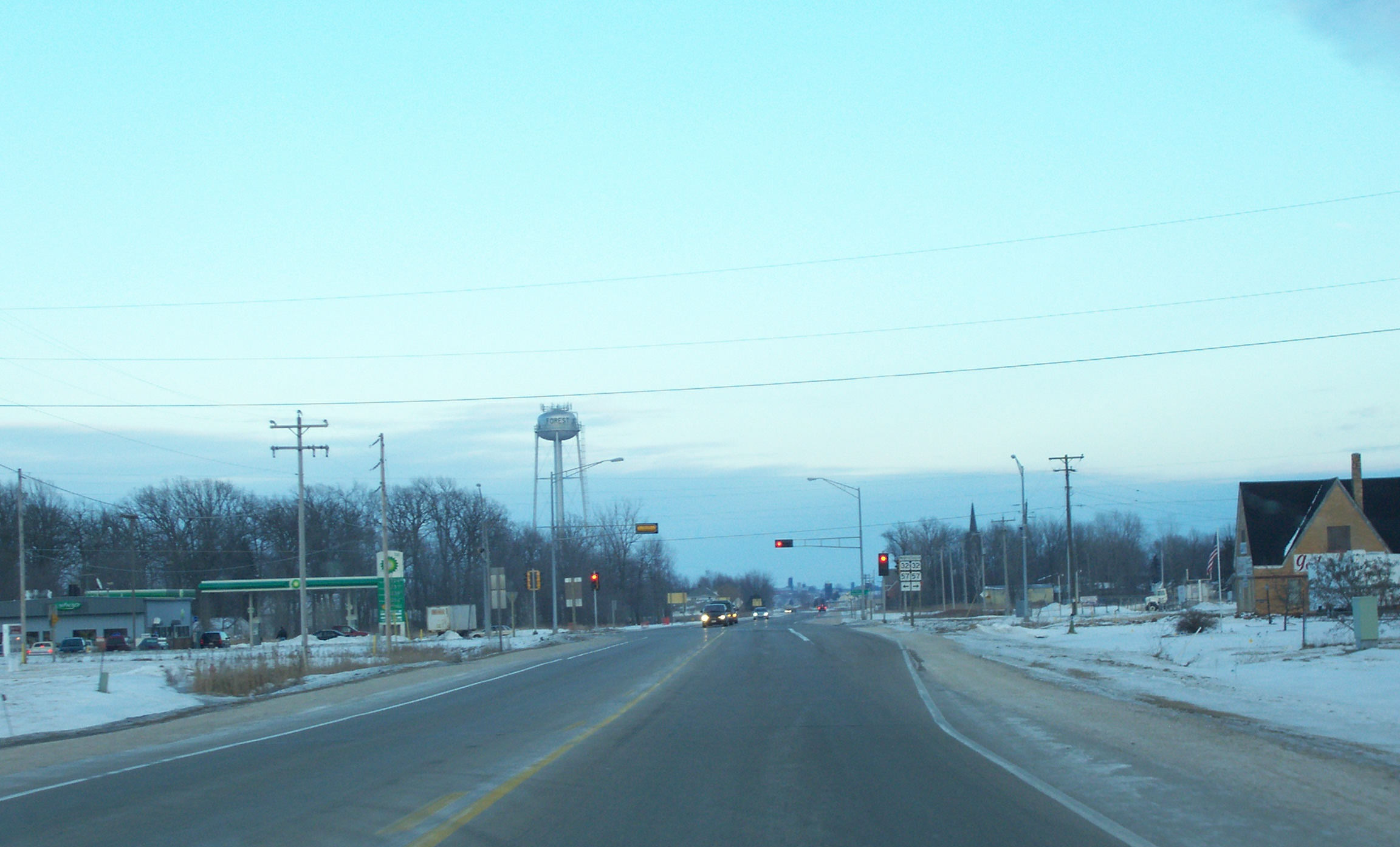
- Looking east at Forest Junction on U.S. Route 10
- Motto: You can get there from here!
- Location within the state of Wisconsin
- Coordinates: 44°12′45″N 88°08′39″W
- Country: United States
- State: Wisconsin
- County: Calumet
- Town: Brillion

Area
  - Total: 2.596 sq mi (6.72 km^{2})
  - Land: 2.594 sq mi (6.72 km^{2})
  - Water: 0.002 sq mi (0.0052 km^{2})

Population (2020)
  - Total: 746
  - Density: 288/sq mi (111/km^{2})
- Time zone: UTC-6 (Central (CST))
  - Summer (DST): UTC-5 (CDT)
- ZIP Codes: 54123
- Area code: 920

Forest Junction is an unincorporated census-designated place in the town of Brillion, Calumet County, Wisconsin, United States. As of the 2020 census, the population was 746, up from the 2010 census, in which its population was 616.

The community has its own water tower and utilities. Its ZIP Code is 54123.

== History ==
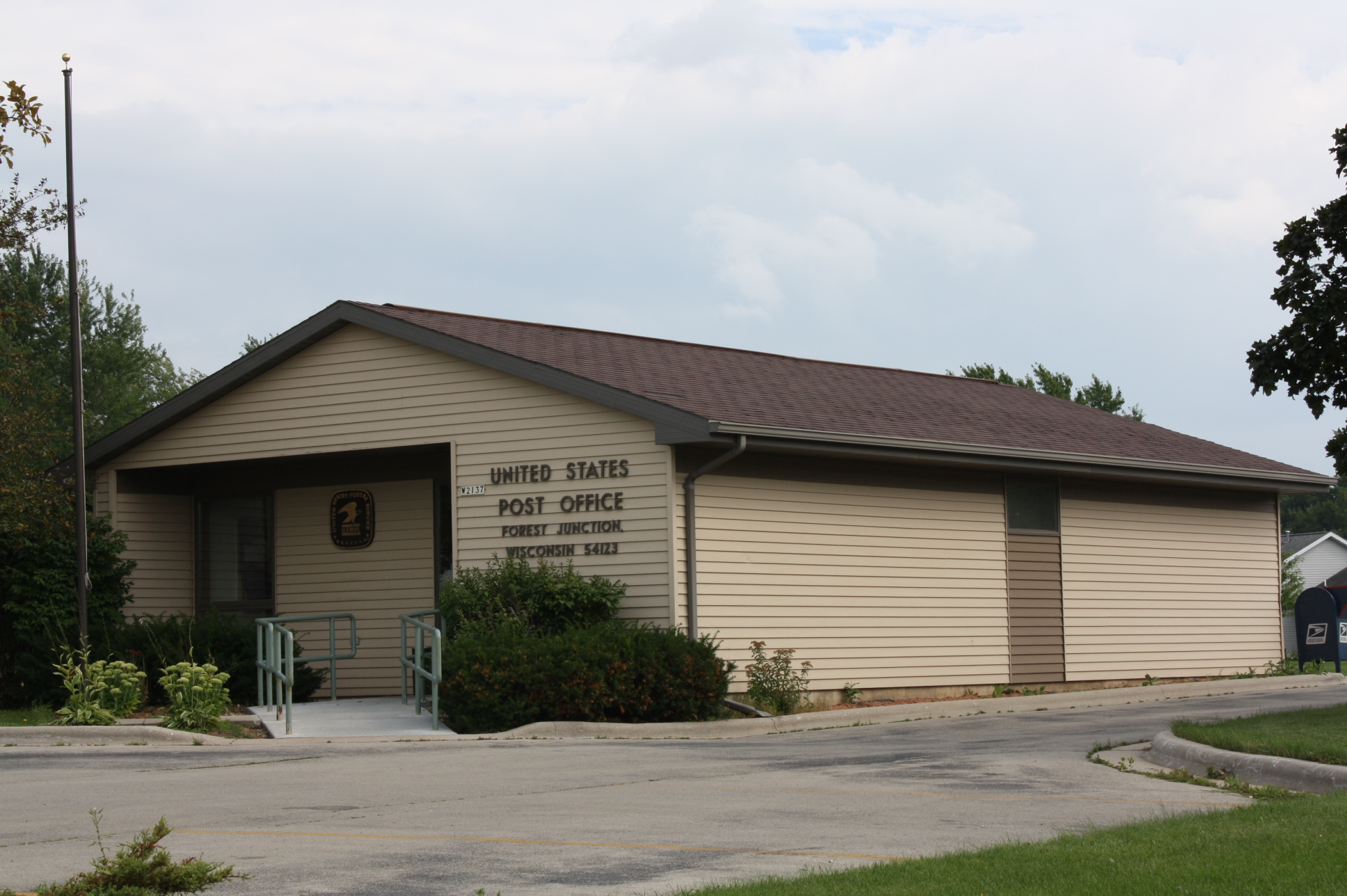
Post office on US 10

A post office called Forest Junction has been in operation since 1873. The community was so named from its location at a rail junction near the forest.

The first railroad through here in 1872 was the Appleton & New London Railroad. This railroad later became the Milwaukee, Lake Shore & Western Railroad, a predecessor of the Chicago and North Western Railway (C&NW). This line has since been abandoned and is currently the 'Eastern leg' of the Friendship State Trail.

The second railroad, the CMStP&P was built as the Milwaukee & Northern whose line through here ran to Green Bay in 1873. This formed a diamond rail junction at Milepost 88, in this community. Late in the 1920s, the Railroad was renamed, Chicago, Milwaukee, St. Paul & Pacific, though it was unofficially shortened to "The Milwaukee Road."

=== Forest Junction Union depot ===
The first Forest Junction Union depot, combining a freight warehouse at its southern end and a ticket office and passenger waiting room at its northern end, was built in the south east angle of the crossing, facing the Milwaukee & Northern tracks. This depot succumbed to a fire, date unrecorded. The second Union depot in the southwest quadrant was built in 1887 (pictures). Forest Junction depot is a 'sister' to the Milwaukee Road's Stiles Junction, WI depot as they share the same architectural plan.

=== American Pickers Television Show ===
Forest Junction was featured on the TV show, American Pickers. The episode aired October 30, 2024, and was titled the “DIY DeLorean”, season 26 episode 4. The episode starred Mike Wolfe and featured local resident, Tracy Olson.

== Geography ==
Forest Junction is located at the intersection of Wisconsin Highway 57/Wisconsin Highway 32 and U.S. Route 10. 57/32 runs north–south through the area, and 10 runs east–west.

== Notable people ==
- Bernard E. Brandt, farmer and Wisconsin state legislator, was born in Forest Junction.
- Silas J. Kloehn, orthodontist
- Alvin Ott, member of the Wisconsin State Assembly

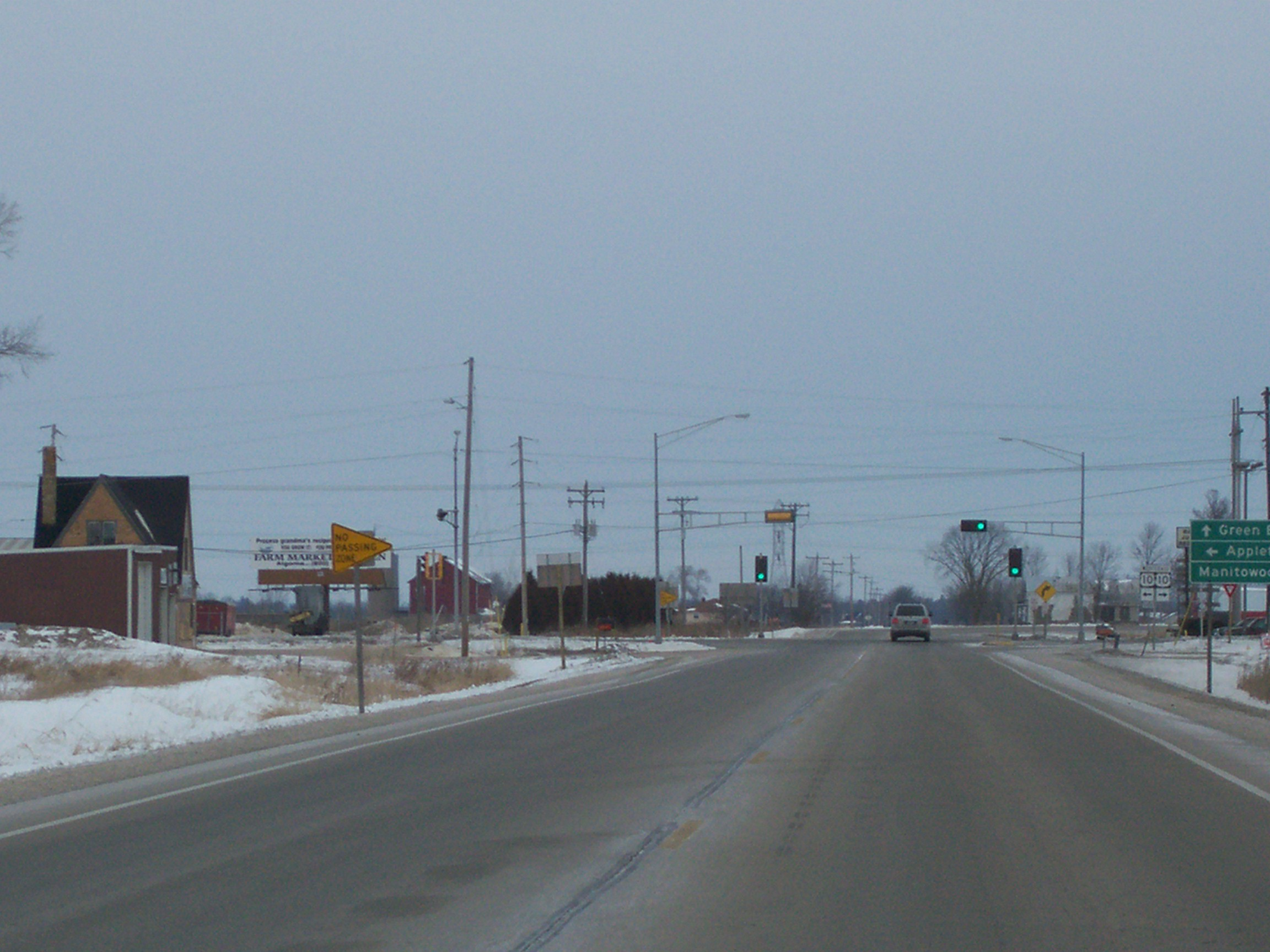
Looking north at Forest Junction on WIS-57/WIS-32

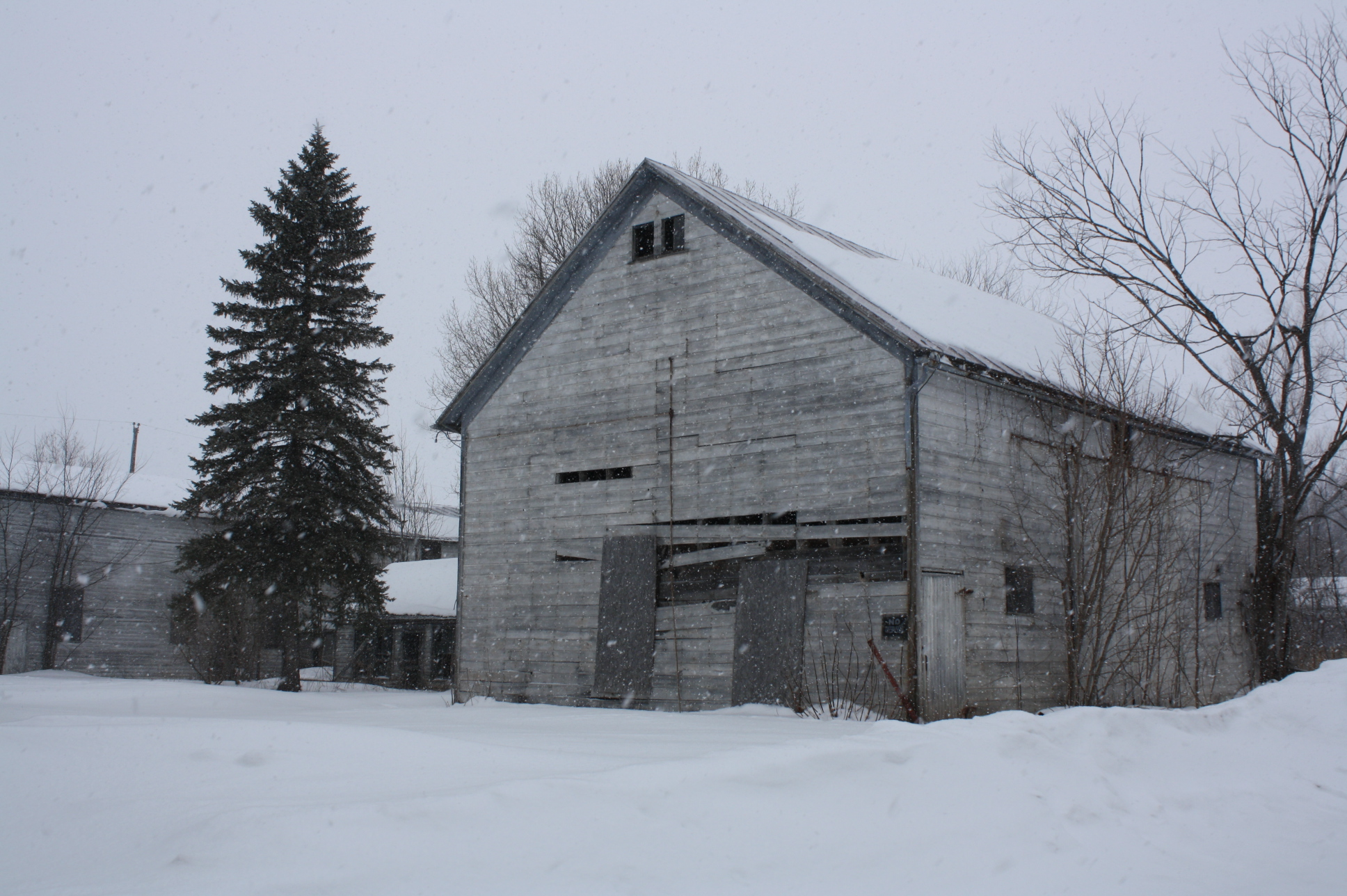
Building in Haese Memorial Village Historic District
