= Stiles, Wisconsin =

- Town
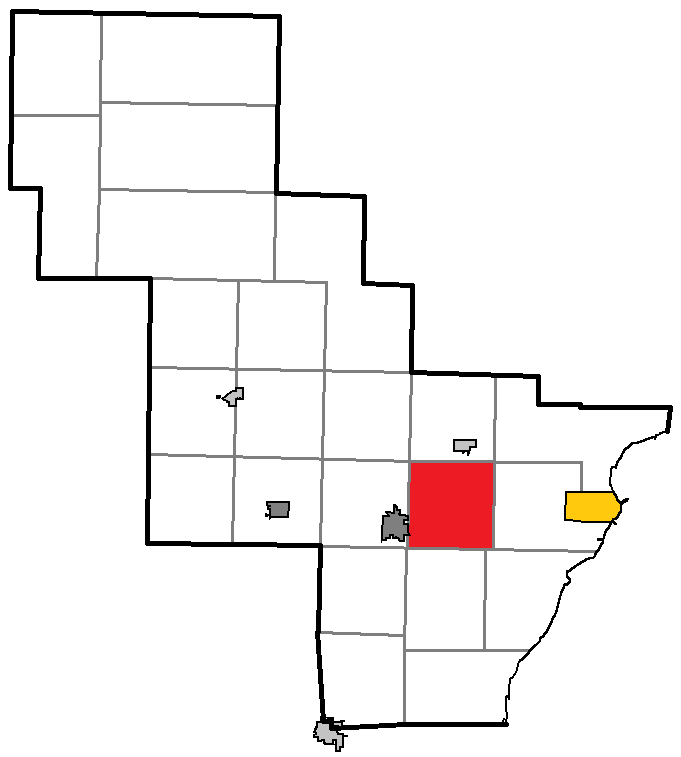
- Location of Stiles, within Oconto County
- Coordinates: 44°52′52″N 88°3′14″W
- Country: United States
- State: Wisconsin
- County: Oconto
- Named for: Anson Eldred in 1853 settled in this area. He named it after his son, Howard Stiles Eldred.

Area
  - Total: 35.2 sq mi (91.2 km^{2})
  - Land: 34.4 sq mi (89.0 km^{2})
  - Water: 0.81 sq mi (2.1 km^{2})
- Elevation: 682 ft (208 m)

Population (2020)
  - Total: 1,518
  - Density: 44.2/sq mi (17.1/km^{2})
- Time zone: UTC-6 (Central (CST))
  - Summer (DST): UTC-5 (CDT)
- ZIP Code: 54139
- FIPS code: 55-77300
- GNIS feature ID: 1584224
- Website: http://townofstiles.org/

Stiles is a town in Oconto County, Wisconsin, United States. The population was 1,518 at the 2020 census. The town of Stiles was surveyed in 1839 and organized in 1852. The town was originally planned to be named Eldred.

The town established a post office in 1855, but it was discontinued in early 1882. Later that year in late 1882, the town established a new post office that remained in operation until 1976.

== Geography ==
According to the United States Census Bureau, the town has a total area of 35.2 square miles (91.2 km^{2}), of which 34.4 square miles (89.0 km^{2}) is land and 0.8 square mile (2.1 km^{2}) (2.36%) is water.

Also within Stiles are two unincorporated areas: Stiles Junction and a ghost town named Leighton.

- Leighton was named for the John Leigh family who settled in the area along the Little River in the late 1860s and operated a small sawmill there into the 1880s.
- Stiles Junction came to be named by the 1883 crossing by the C&NW's branch line running between Clintonville and nearby Oconto of the preexisting Milwaukee Road (1882).

== Demographics ==
As of the census of 2000, there were 1,465 people, 578 households, and 421 families residing in the town. The population density was 42.6 people per square mile (16.5/km^{2}). There were 620 housing units at an average density of 18.0 per square mile (7.0/km^{2}). The racial makeup of the town was 98.23% White, 0.07% African American, 0.41% Native American, 0.07% Asian, 0.14% from other races, and 1.09% from two or more races. Hispanic or Latino of any race were 0.48% of the population.

There were 578 households, out of which 33.6% had children under the age of 18 living with them, 62.3% were married couples living together, 5.2% had a female householder with no husband present, and 27.0% were non-families. 21.5% of all households were made up of individuals, and 8.5% had someone living alone who was 65 years of age or older. The average household size was 2.53 and the average family size was 2.95.

In the town, the population was spread out, with 26.5% under the age of 18, 5.6% from 18 to 24, 33.1% from 25 to 44, 24.2% from 45 to 64, and 10.6% who were 65 years of age or older. The median age was 39 years. For every 100 females, there were 102.9 males. For every 100 females age 18 and over, there were 104.0 males.

The median income for a household in the town was $43,882, and the median income for a family was $48,472. Males had a median income of $33,200 versus $23,320 for females. The per capita income for the town was $18,669. About 4.3% of families and 6.0% of the population were below the poverty line, including 5.4% of those under age 18 and 7.1% of those age 65 or over.

== Notable people ==
- John Leigh, businessman and politician, lived in the town.
