= Mihkel Mutt =

Estonian writer

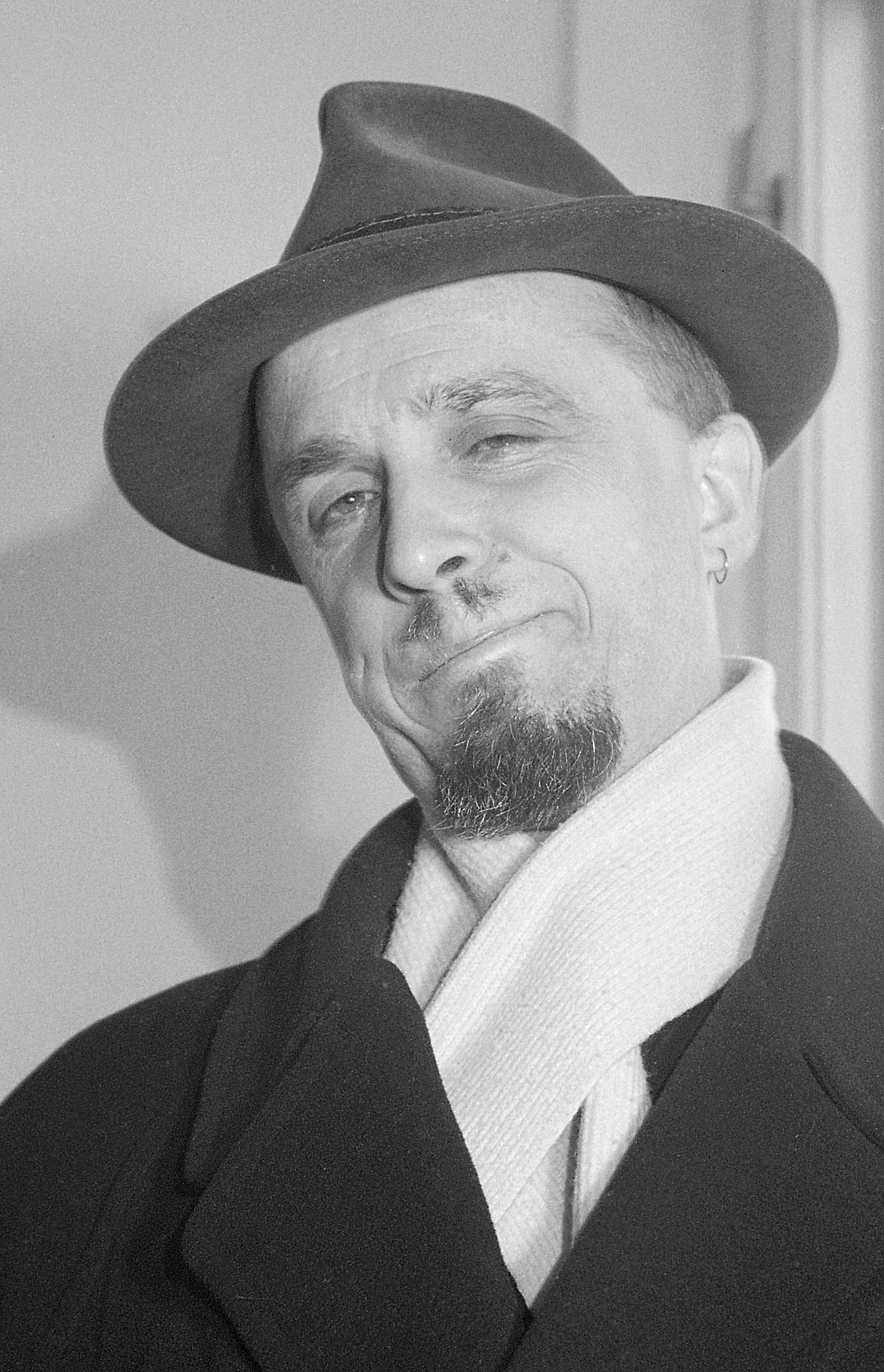

Mihkel Mutt (born 18 February 1953), also known as Muti Miki, is an Estonian writer, essayist, columnist and editor.

== Life ==
Mutt was born in Tartu. He is the son of linguist and translator Oleg Mutt and the grandson of military colonel and diplomat Victor Mutt. Mutt studied philology and journalism at the University of Tartu from 1971 to 1976. After completing his studies, he was an editor at a publishing house and for various literary journals until 1987. After he worked two years as a dramatist at a youth theater (Noorsooteater). Between 1990/91 Mutt was the head of the Information Department in the Estonian Ministry of Foreign Affairs. 1992-93 he worked for weekly newspapers Eesti Ekspress and Eesti Aeg and the daily Hommikuleht. He also wrote scripts for TV-series. Mihkel Mutt was a member of the literary cooperative "Kupar" that was founded in 1987 by ten writers as the first non-state publishing house in the former Soviet Union. From 1992 to 1999 he was the president of PEN Estonia

From 1997 to 2005 Mutt headed the cultural journal Sirp. He has been the editor-in-chief of Estonia's foremost literary magazine Looming 2005-2016.

== Works ==
Mihkel Mutt made his name as a theatre and literary critic and satirist in the early 1970s. His first short stories were published at the end of the decade and his first book came out in 1980. His early prose is characterized by irony and satire. His novels deal with socio-cultural and interpersonal issues, marriage problems, etc. Many of his characters are urban intellectuals or artistically inclined dropouts. In his latest novels, he has documented the arrival of the free-market economy and open society in Estonia and their impact on various social groups. Beside novels and stories, he has published travel books and books for children and continued as a prolific cultural critic. After the restoration of Estonia's independence he started writing columns for various newspapers (mainly about social issues and world politics). He has translated angloamerican authors for the stage (A.Wesker, T.Stoppard, E.O'Neill, D.Pownall, etc.)

He has been awarded with the Tuglas' Prize (for the best short story of the year in 1981 and 2007) and has twice received the Virumaa Literature Prize for the best historical novel of the year (in 1994 for Rahvusvaheline mees), describing Estonia's pursuit for international recognition, and Kooparahvas läheb ajalukku, which looks back at the past half a century in Estonia's history.

Among his books are 7 novels, 5 short story collections, 2 children's books, 2 travel diaries, 5 volumes of essays and criticism, 6 volumes of memoires and a play.

Among the most important:

- Fabiani õpilane (Fabian's Pupil). 1980. Stories.
- Hiired tuules (Mice in the Wind). 1982. Novel.
- Näärivana (Father Frost). 1986. Children's book.
- Kolm korda Aasias (Three Times to Asia). 1990. Travelogues.
- Pingviin ja raisakass (Penguin and Scavenger Cat). 1992. Novel.
- Rahvusvaheline mees (The International Man). 1994. Novel.
- Muti tabloid (Mutt's tabloid). 2000 Essays and criticism.
- Siseemigrant (Inside-emigrant). 2007. Stories.
- Kooparahvas läheb ajalukku (The Cavemen Chronicle). 2012. Novel.
- Õhtumaa Eesti (Estonia of the Western World). 2014. Essays and criticism.

== Personal ==
Mihkel Mutt's father was the English philologist and translator Oleg Mutt. His grandfather Victor Mutt was a field officer and diplomat (Estonian Consul General in New York 1926-32). His uncle was the biochemist Viktor Mutt at Karolinska Institute in Stockholm.

He has been married to the visual artist Tiina Tammetalu since 1991.
