= Abja-Paluoja =

Town in Estonia

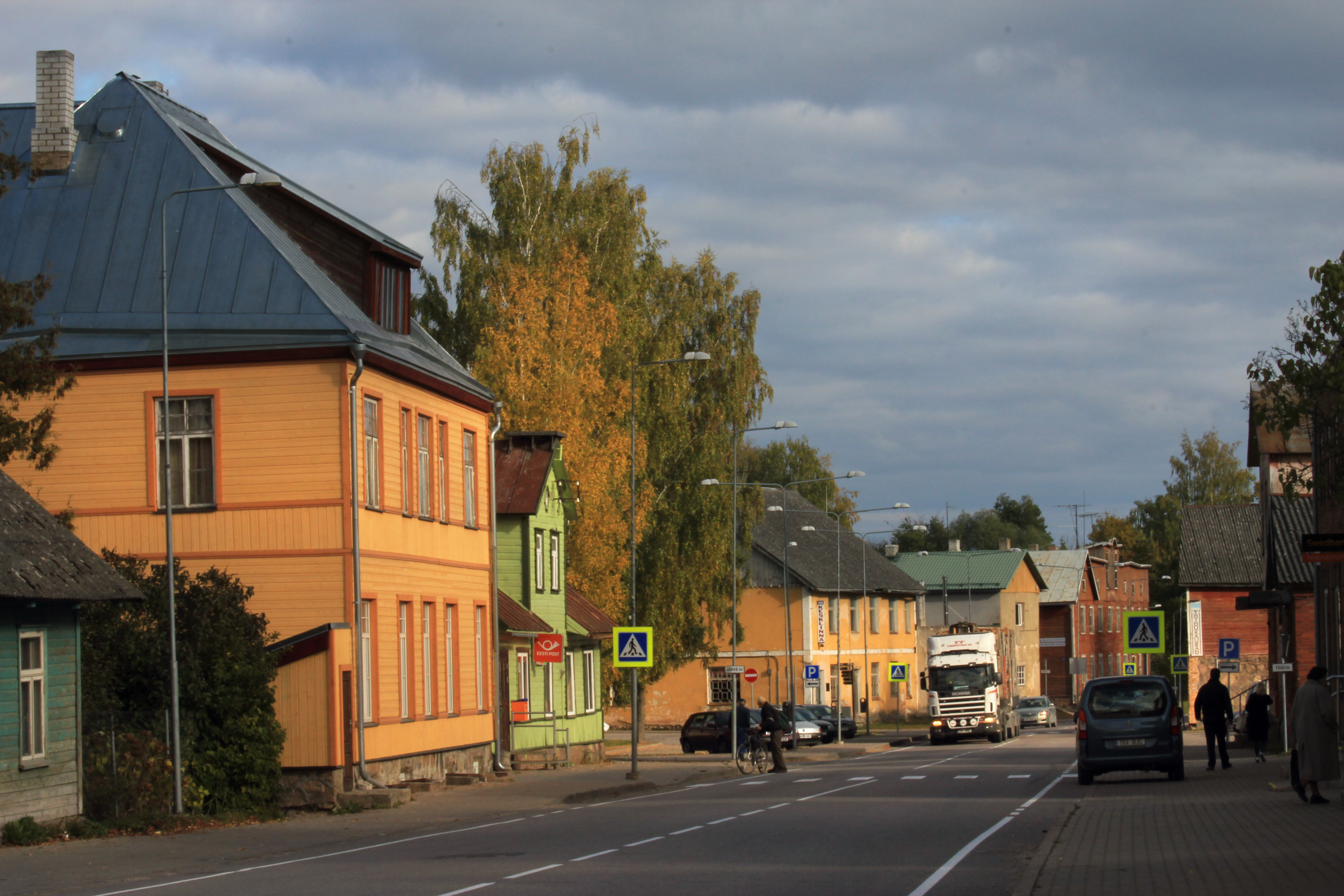
- Main street in Abja-Paluoja

- Location within Estonia Location within Europe
- Coordinates: 58°07′33″N 25°21′31″E
- Country: Estonia
- County: Viljandi County
- Municipality: Mulgi Parish
- Town status: 1993

Population (2024)
  - Total: 1,056
  - Rank: 44th
- Time zone: UTC+2 (EET)

Abja-Paluoja is a town in Mulgi Parish, Viljandi County, in southern Estonia. Abja-Paluoja got the town status and became a separate urban municipality in 1993.

== History ==
First documented records of the Abja manor and village date from 1457 (Abbalis et Meitzekull).

From 1897 to 1973, the railway line passed through Abja-Paluoja, and there was a railway station in the town.

In 1913, a flax factory was established near Abja-Paluoja because flax cultivation had developed in the area.

The Abja Gymnasium (secondary school) was opened in 1940.

Abja-Paluoja was the centre of Abja raion from 1950 to 1962. Abja-Paluoja gained town rights and became a separate urban municipality in 1993. In 1998, it was merged into surrounding rural municipality (Abja Parish) and was its administrative centre until 2017.

== Notable people ==
- Karl August Hindrey (1875–1947), writer, journalist, and cartoonist
- Aino Jõgi (1922–2013), linguist and translator
- Tarmo Pihlap (1952–1999), singer and guitarist
- Peep Aru (born 1953), politician, Mayor of Viljandi, 1999 to 2003 and again 2005 to 2007.
- Mati Laur (born 1955), professor of general history at the University of Tartu
- Peeter Rahnel (born 1957), politician, Mayor of Abja-Paluoja, 1994 to 1996
- Riho Västrik (born 1965), filmmaker, producer, screenwriter, journalist, and historian
- Kaimo Kuusk (born 1975), diplomat and foreign intelligence officer

== Gallery ==
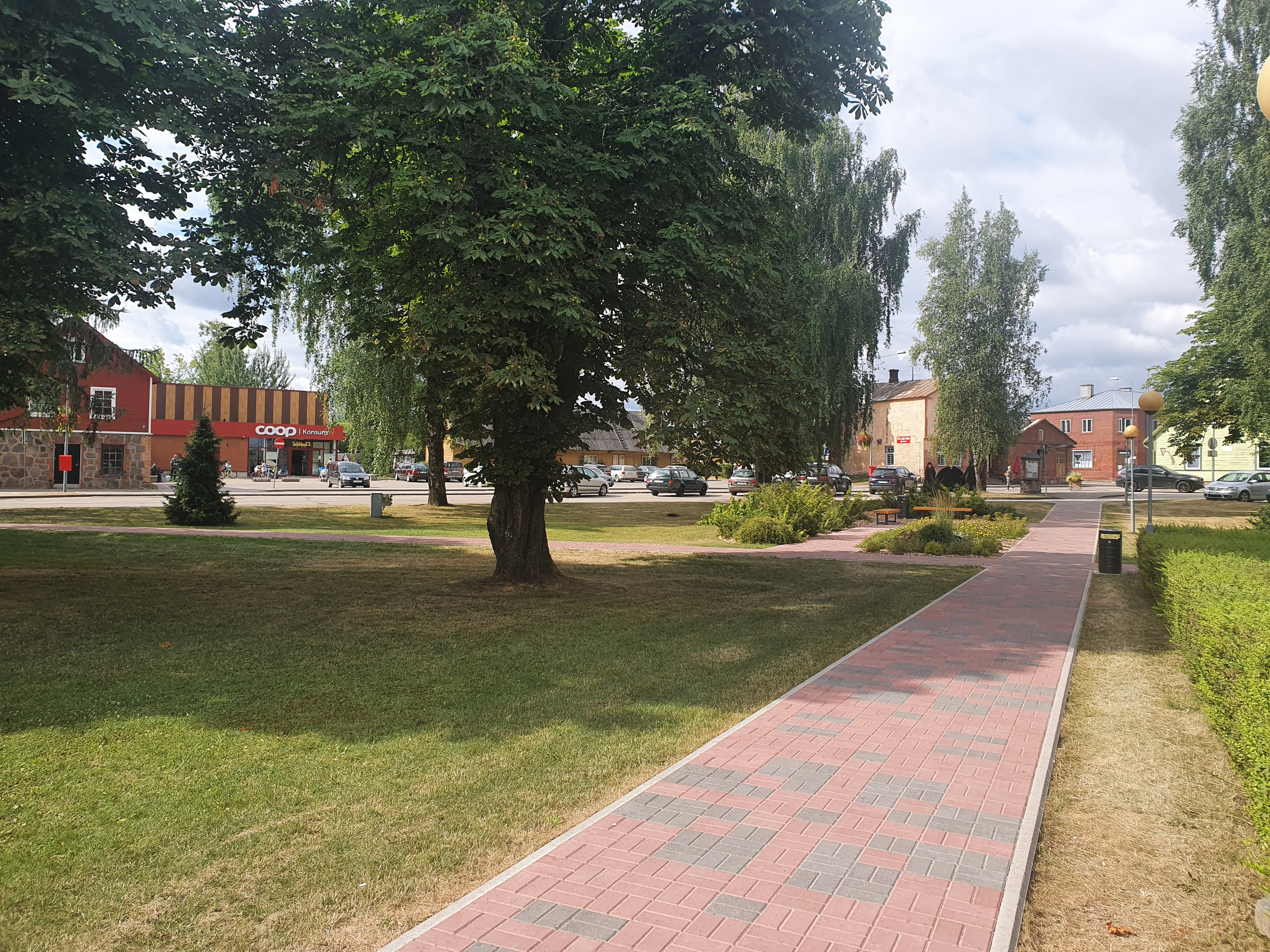
Park in central Abja-Paluoja

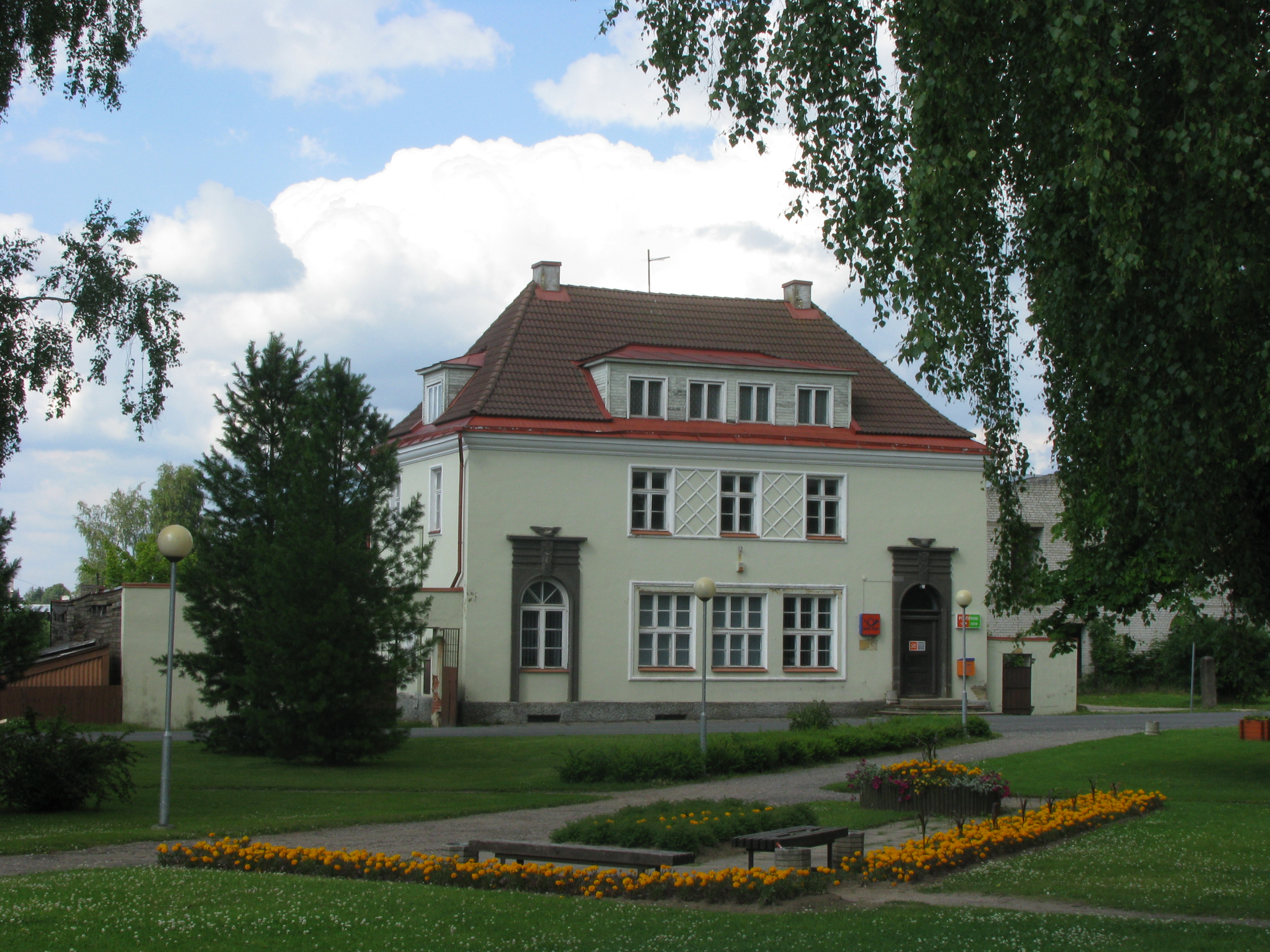
Abja Museum in the historic bank and post office building

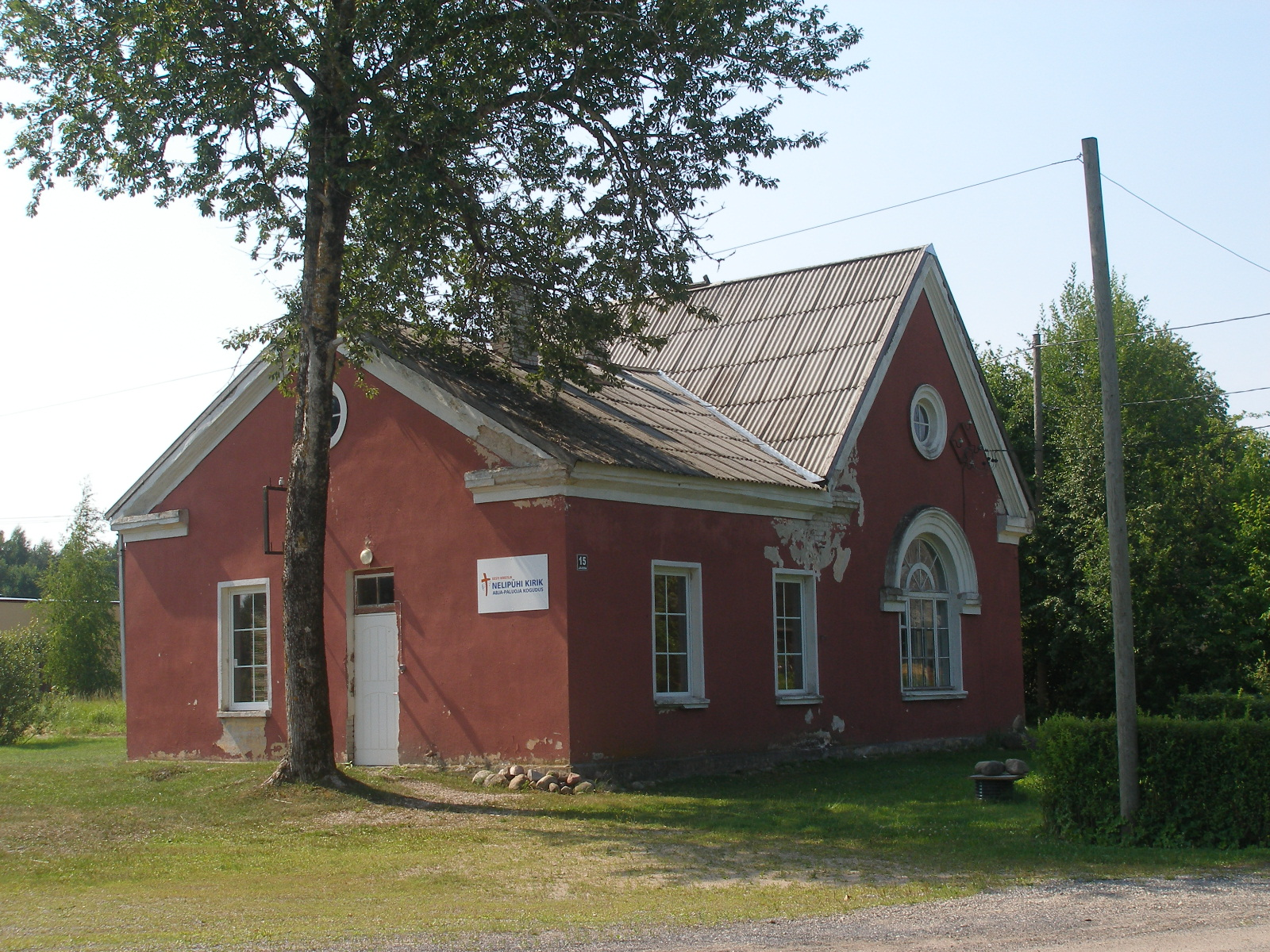
Former railway station (now the building is used by a Pentecostal congregation)

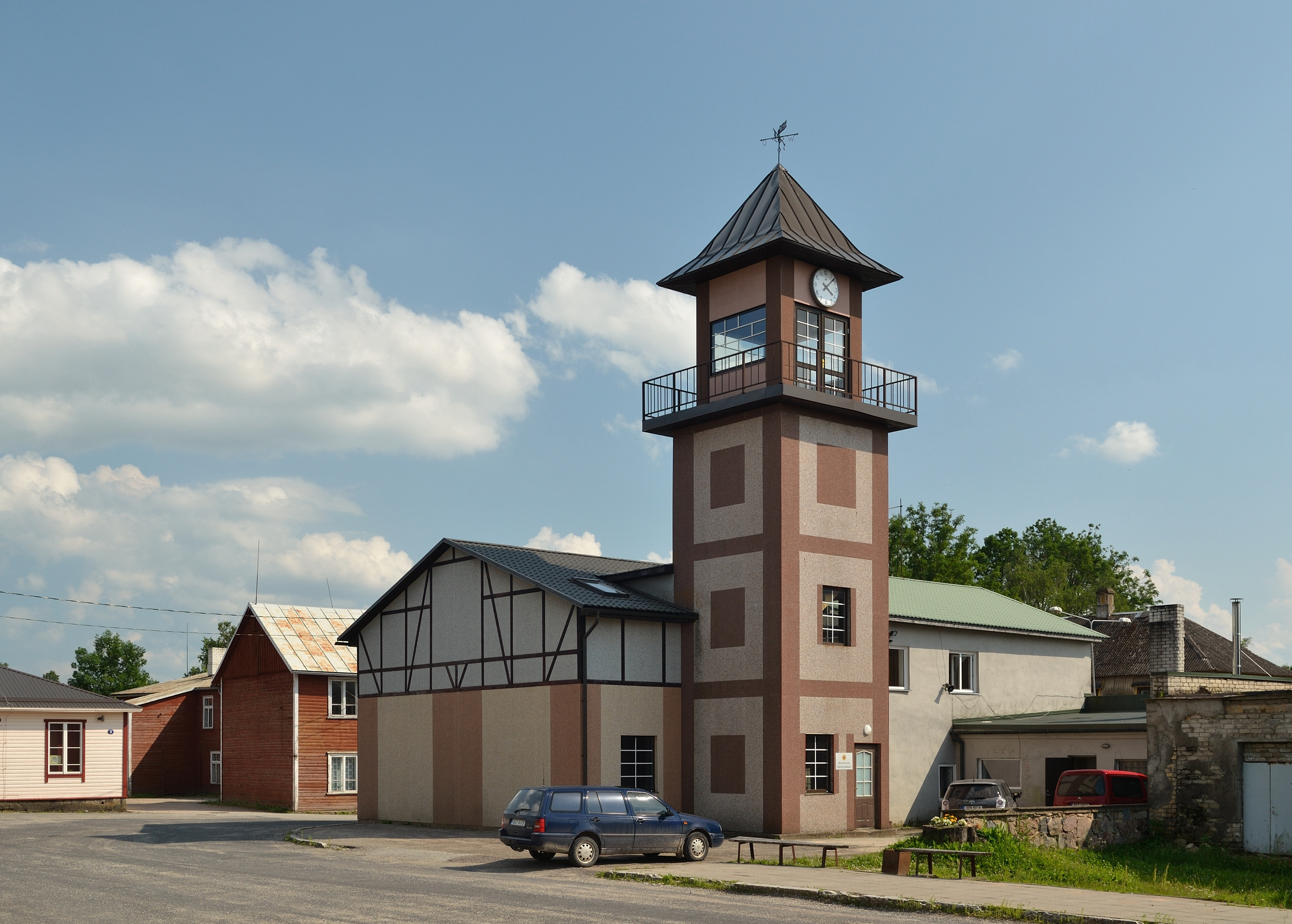
Fire depot

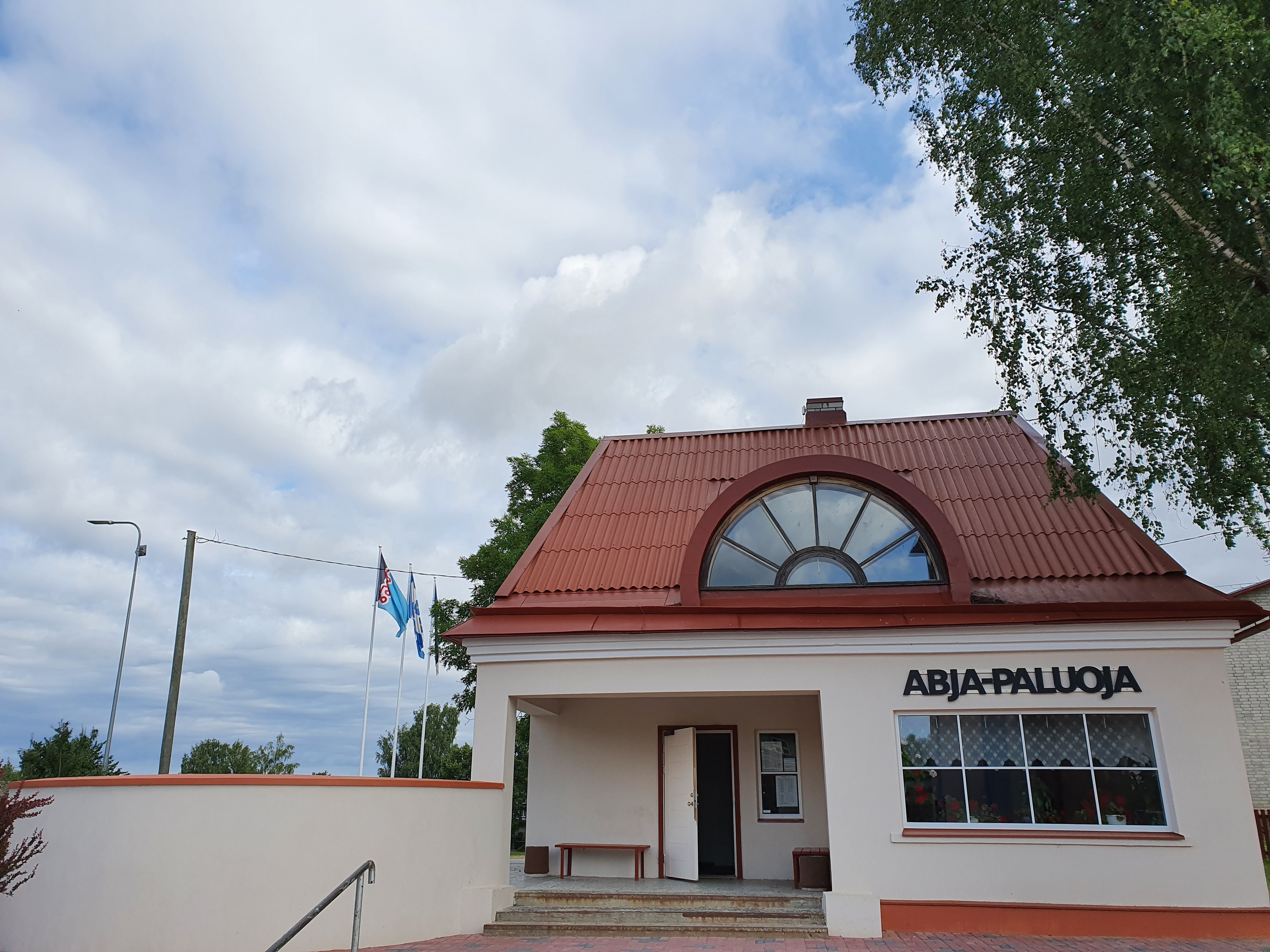
Bus station

Sports and Health Centre
