= Peeter Rahnel =

Estonian politician (born 1957)

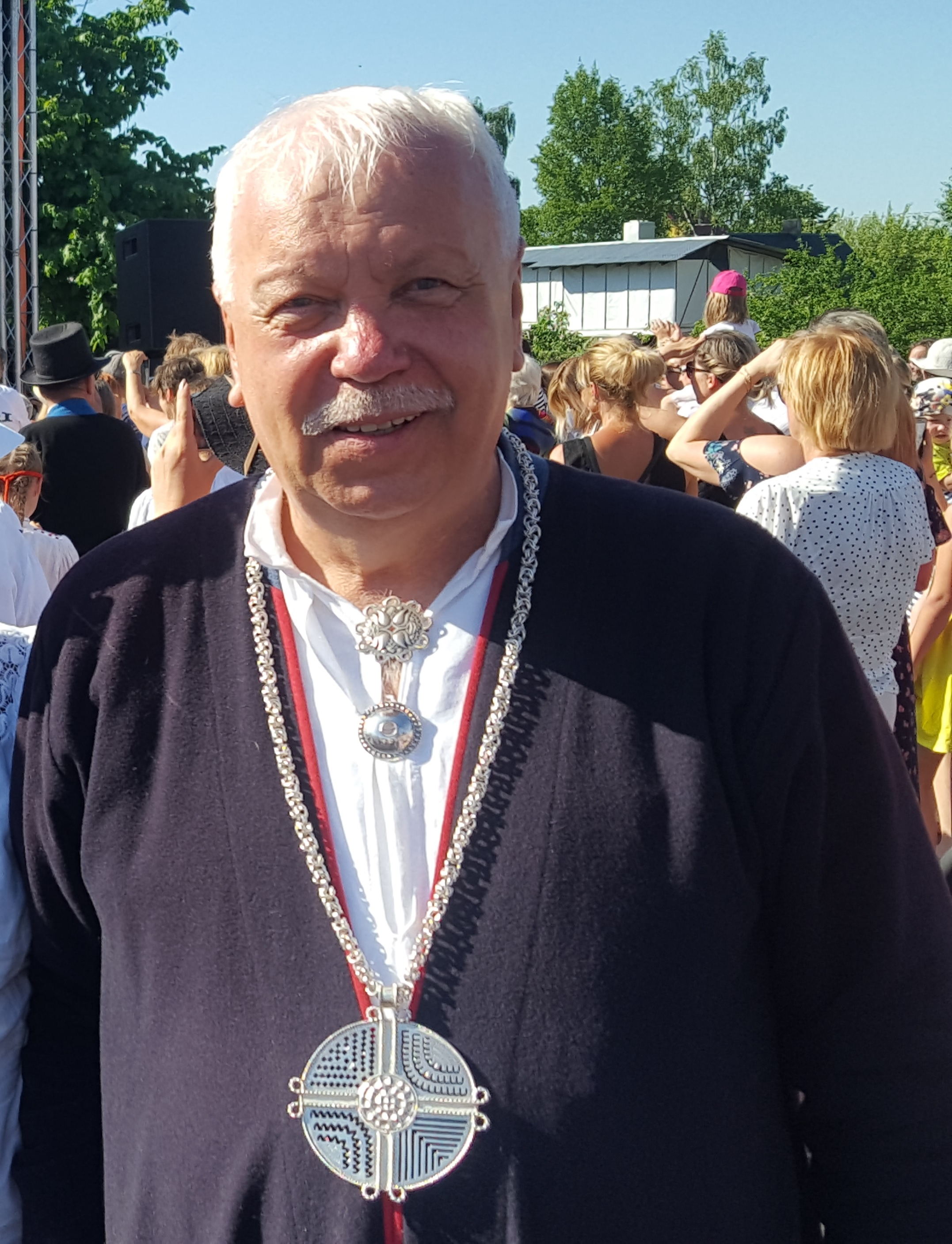
Peeter Rahnel in 2018

Peeter Rahnel (born 23 February 1957 in Abja-Paluoja) is an Estonian politician. He was a member of the XIV Riigikogu.

In 2011 he graduated from the University of Tartu with a degree in history.

From 1994 to 1996, he was the mayor of Abja-Paluoja.

Since 1991 he has been a member of the Estonian Centre Party.
