= Kuusik =

Family name

Kuusik is an Estonian surname (meaning "spruce forest"), and may refer to:

- Edgar-Johan Kuusik (1888–1974), architect
- Harleth Kuusik (b. 1996), fashion model
- Mart Kuusik (1877–1965), rower
- Oliver Kuusik (born 1980), operatic tenor
- Tiit Kuusik (1911–1990), operatic baritone
- Timotheus Kuusik (1863–1940), teacher, translator, writer and politician

== See also ==
- Kuusk
- Kuusiku (disambiguation)
