= Bernard E. Brandt =

American farmer and politician

Bernard Edward Brandt (February 20, 1881 – February 19, 1954) was an American farmer and politician.

Born in Forest Junction, Wisconsin, Brandt was a farmer in the town of Spruce, Wisconsin in Oconto County, Wisconsin. He served as chairman and treasurer of the Town of Spruce and a member of the Oconto County Board of Supervisors. In 1935, Brandt was elected in the Wisconsin State Assembly on the Wisconsin Progressive Party ticket. He died in Green Bay on February 19, 1954, one day before his 73rd birthday.
