= Mati Laur =

Estonian historian

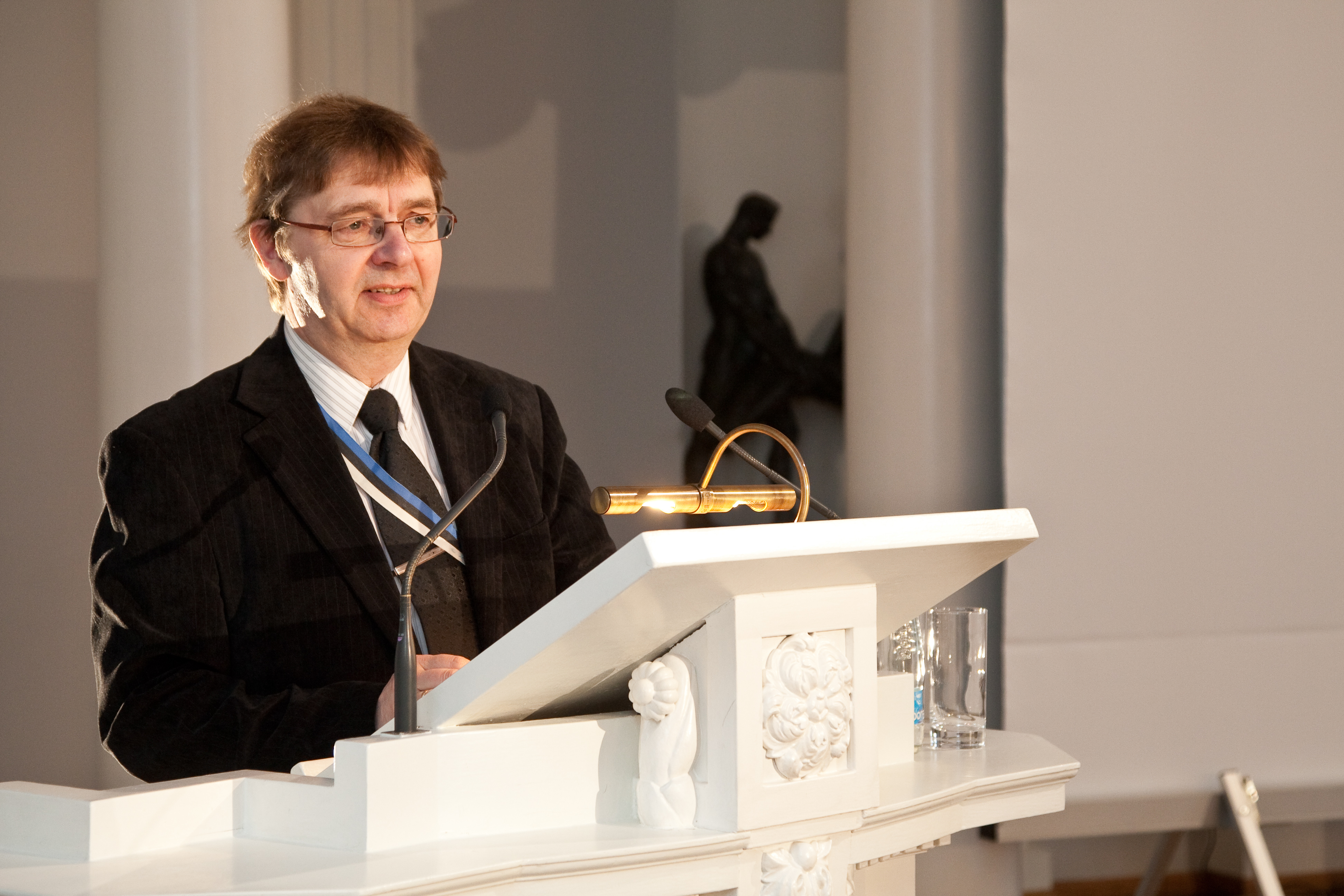
Mati Laur in 2010

Mati Laur (born 17 June 1955, in Abja-Paluoja) is an Estonian historian. He has written and coauthored textbooks about early modern Estonia. He has published scholarly articles about eighteenth-century Estonia, which was also the subject of his doctoral dissertation. Despite this narrow specialisation, he is a professor of general history at the University of Tartu.

Together with Karsten Brüggemann, Laur is the editor of the historical journal Forschungen zur baltischen Geschichte (Studies on Baltic History).
