= Heino Liiv =

Estonian linguist and translator (1930–2021)

- Born: September 7, 1930; Kiuma, Estonia
- Died: March 23, 2021 (aged 90)
- Occupations: Linguist and philologist

Heino Liiv (September 7, 1930 – March 23, 2021) was an Estonian linguist and philologist specializing in English.

== Early life and education ==
Liiv was born in Kiuma, Estonia in 1930. In 1949, during the March deportation, he was deported to Siberia as a student at Võru High School No. 1. In exile, he received his higher education at Irkutsk State Linguistic University.

== Career ==
In 1956, Liiv returned to Estonia. He worked as a foreign language teacher at his former high school in Võru (renamed Friedrich Reinhold Kreutzwald High School No. 1 in 1953) and at High School No. 5 in Tartu. In 1961, Kallista Kann invited him to the University of Tartu, where he started working as an instructor in the Department of English Philology and later continued as a senior lecturer. From 1964 to 1966, he studied at Leningrad State University. In 1975, he received a doctoral degree in pedagogy at A. I. Herzen Russian State Pedagogical University with the dissertation Усвоение видо-временных форм английского глагола студентами-эстонцами на 1 курсе языкового вуза (Mastering Aspectual and Tense Forms of English Verbs by Estonian Students in the First Year of a University Language Program). From 1978 to 1992, he was an associate professor and head of the Department of English Philology at the University of Tartu as the successor to Oleg Mutt, from 1973 to 1976 and again from 1985 to 1989 vice dean of the Faculty of Philology, from 1989 to 1990 acting dean, and from 1990 to 1992 head of the Romance and Germanic Philology Department. Notably, Liiv managed to serve in these various leadership positions without being a member of the Communist Party. Liiv was one of the first Estonian linguists to apply quantitative methods in linguistic research. He retired as an associate professor emeritus in the humanities and arts at the University of Tartu.

== Awards ==
- 1996–1997 University of Tartu medal

== Bibliography ==
- 1969: English Tenses: A Programmed Course
- 1970: Inglise keele õpik edasijõudnuile (with Linda Ariva and Amanda Kriit)
- 1970: Mänge võõrkeelte õpetamiseks
- 1977: Matemaatika ülesannete kogu ettevalmistusosakonna ja -kursuste kuulajaile (with Heli Kõiv)
- 1978: Advanced English for the Estonian Learner 1 (with Nora Toots)
- 1983: Advanced English for the Estonian Learner 2 (with Nora Toots)
- 1991: Inglise keele grammatika (with Ann Pikver)
- 1994: Inglise keele grammatika keskkoolile (with Ann Pikver)
- 1996: Praktiline inglise keele grammatika (with Ann Pikver)
- 2006: Inglise keele grammatika põhireeglid
