= John Leigh (Wisconsin politician) =

American lumberman and politician

John Leigh (December 20, 1827 – October 5, 1893) was an American lumberman and politician.

Born in Dublin, Ireland, Leigh emigrated to the United States in 1838 and settled in Maine. In 1850, Leigh moved to Milwaukee, Wisconsin and then settled in the community of Leighton, in the town of Stiles, Oconto County, Wisconsin. He operated a saw mill and then a flour mill. In 1875, Stiles served in the Wisconsin State Assembly and was a Republican. Leigh died at his home in the town of Stiles. The ghost town of Leighton, Wisconsin was named after John Leigh and his family.
