= Gregory Kloehn =

American artist

Gregory Kloehn is an artist and tiny house builder in Oakland, California. Kloehn uses found materials, including illegally dumped items, to build unique structures at a cost of less than $100. The houses are typically just over one meter wide and several meters long, and include doors and windows, and small wheels for mobility. Kloehn has given away as many as 20 of the houses, to formerly homeless people. He first became known for his designs in 2011, when he built a home in Brooklyn, New York out of a dumpster, outfitting it with granite countertops, hardwood floors, a rooftop deck and plumbing.
