= Silas J. Kloehn =

American orthodontist

Silas J. Kloehn (November 7, 1902 – February 20, 1985) was an American orthodontist who was part of the journal The Angle Orthodontist for 40 years. Due to his contributions, the journal transitioned from a dependent organization in 1940s to an independent organization in the 1950s. His work was also instrumental in the revival of cervical traction and Nance's Arch-Length Analysis in orthodontics.

== Life ==
He was born in Forest Junction, Wisconsin in 1902. In his early childhood, he worked at a farm of his family. He graduated at the age of 16 and attended Marquette University School of Dentistry, where he obtained his dental degree in 1924. He practiced general dentistry in Appleton, Wisconsin for 14 years. He applied to the University of Illinois at Chicago College of Dentistry Orthodontic Program in 1935 and was accepted. Later he eventually moved back to Appleton, Wisconsin. He was appointed as second-ever business manager of the journal The Angle Orthodontist. He served in this position for 40 years.

In 1968 he presented the George W. Grieve Memorial Lecture at Canadian Society of Orthodontists. He was also a Fellow of the International College of Dentists and the American College of Dentists, and a member of the editorial board of the AAO.

== Orthodontics ==
In 1947, Kloehn reported on the use of occipital Orthodontic headgear which was attached by hooks to a maxillary .045 in archwire against the first molars. To prevent the side-effect of molar tipping, he modified the appliance by taking the bow and soldering it to the inner arch of the incisor area and therefore eliminated the "Victorian" headcap stigma associated with headgear. Therefore, the headgear was modified with a cervical neck strap.

== Award ==
- Albert H. Ketcham Memorial Award, 1970
