= Kaimo Kuusk =

Estonian diplomat (born 1975)

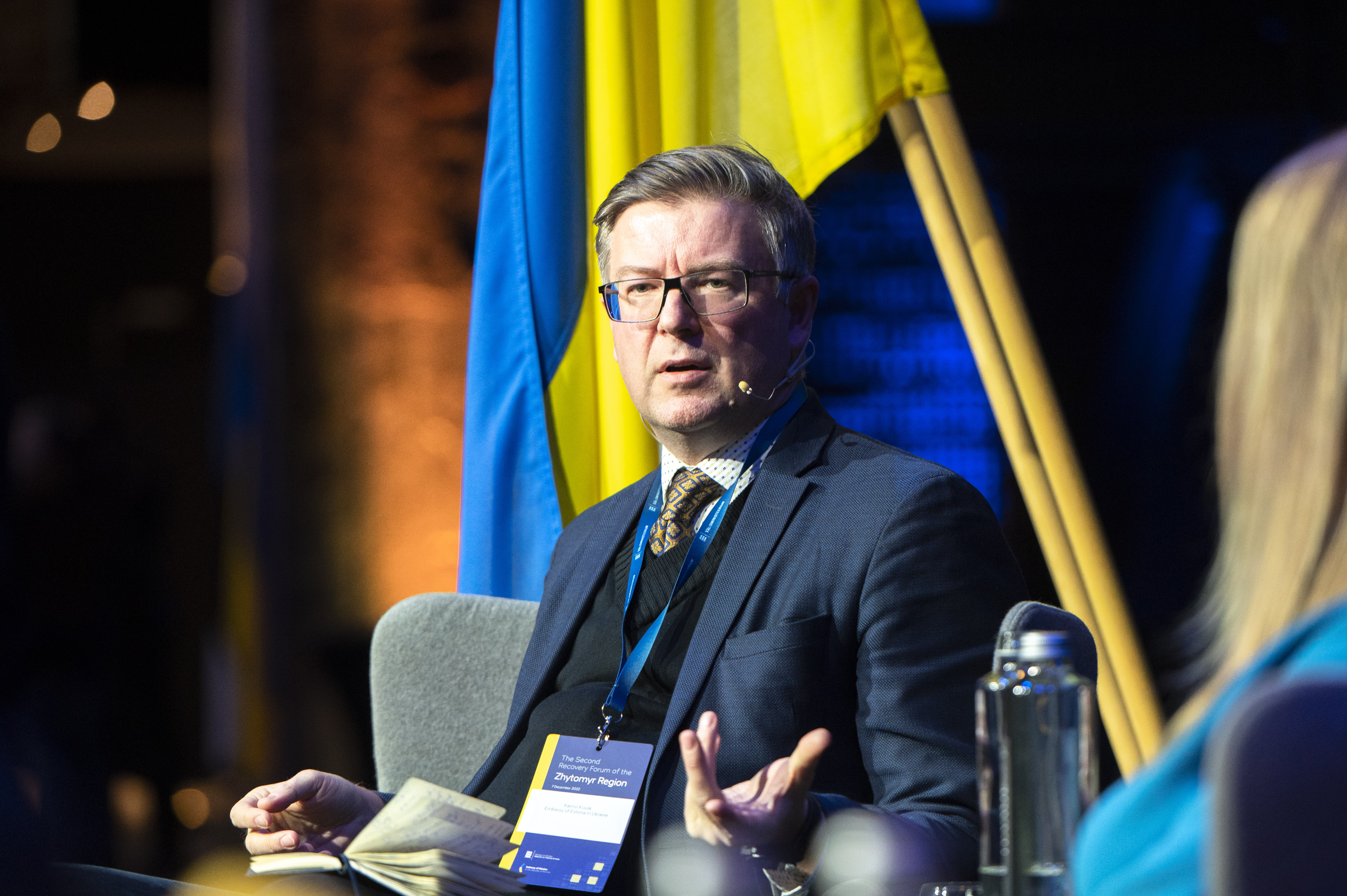
Kuusk at the Second Recovery Forum of the Zhytomyr Region in 2022

Kaimo Kuusk (born 5 December 1975), is an Estonian diplomat and foreign intelligence officer. From 2019 until 2023, he was the Estonian ambassador to Ukraine. In 2023, he became Estonia's ambassador to Lithuania.

== Early life and education ==
Kaimo Kuusk was born in Abja-Paluoja. He attended secondary school at the Hugo Treffner Gymnasium in Tartu. He is a 1998 graduate of the Faculty of Social Sciences of the University of Tartu.

== Career ==
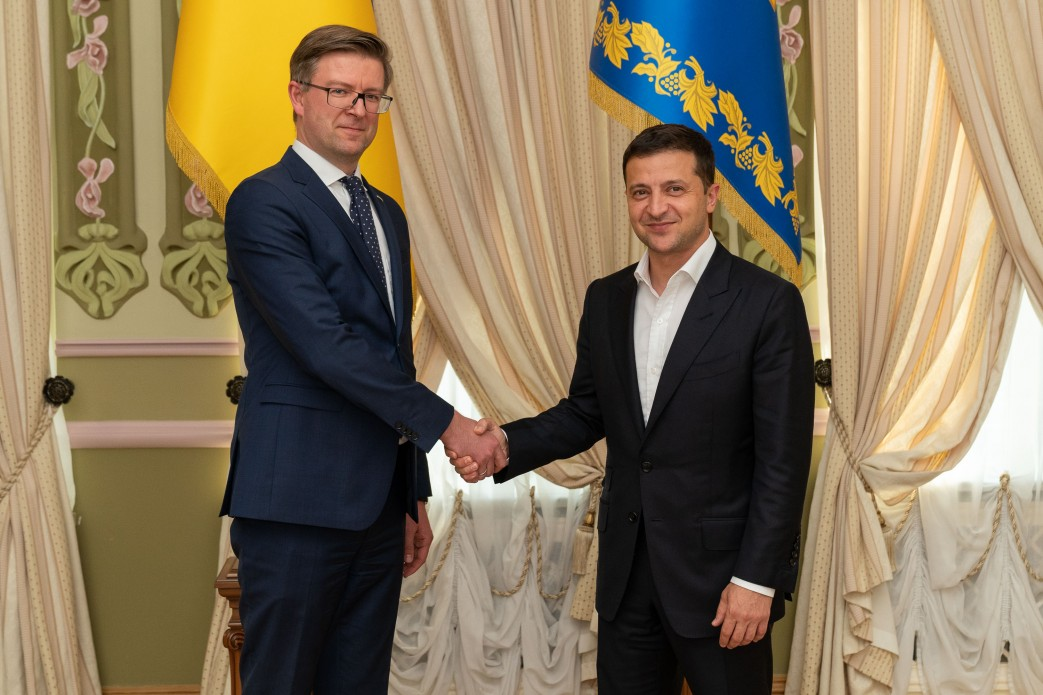
Kaimo Kuusk (left) greets Ukrainian President Volodymyr Zelenskyy in 2019

Kuusk began his career employed at the Estonian Foreign Intelligence Service (Estonian: Välisluureamet, VLA). He was head of the department from 1998 until 2008, and Deputy Director General from 2008 until 2019. In 2019, he was appointed the Advisor of the Eastern Europe and Central Asia Bureau of the Estonian Ministry of Foreign Affairs (Estonian: Eesti Vabariigi Välisministeerium). On 11 July 2019, he was appointed as the Ambassador Extraordinary and Plenipotentiary of the Republic of Estonia to Ukraine, succeeding Gert Antsu. He arrived in Kyiv for his position on 1 August, and on 11 September 2019, he presented President of Ukraine Volodymyr Zelenskyy his credentials and reaffirmed Estonia's continued support for the sovereignty and territorial integrity of Ukraine.

In 2023, Kuusk was appointed the Estonian ambassador to Lithuania, with Annely Kolk being appointed Estonia's new ambassador to Ukraine. On 28 August 2023, Kuusk presented President of Lithuania Gitanas Nausėda his credentials.

In September 2024, Kuusk assumed the position of Permanent Secretary of the Ministry of Defence of Estonia.

== Personal life ==
Kuusk played football for Tallinn football club FC Toompea, retiring in 2014.

== Acknowledgement ==
- Order of the White Star, V Class (2006)
- Cross of Merit, I Class (2022)
