= Aira Kaal =

Estonian writer

Aira Kaal (until 1938 Alma-Vilhelmine Kaal, from 1939 Aira Hone; 7 November 1911, in Uuemõisa Parish, Saare County – 7 April 1988) was an Estonian writer.

From 1931 to 1940, she studied at the University of Tartu, focusing on philosophy, but also learning Estonian literature, world literature and English. From 1938 to 1939, she worked in Great Britain, where she met her husband Arthur Robert Hone, with whom she returned to Estonia. From 1945 to 1950, she was a lecturer at Tartu State University, teaching the foundations of Marxism-Leninism.

In 1980, she was one of the signatories of the "Letter of 40 intellectuals".

== Works ==
- 1966-1978: prose trilogy "Kodunurga laastud" ('Short Accounts on the Home Corner', 1966, 1970, 1978)
- 1976: poetry collection "Hetked merega"
- 1986: short prose collection "Seitse tõtt ja seitse valet" ('Seven Truths and Seven Lies')
