= Spruce, Wisconsin =

- Town
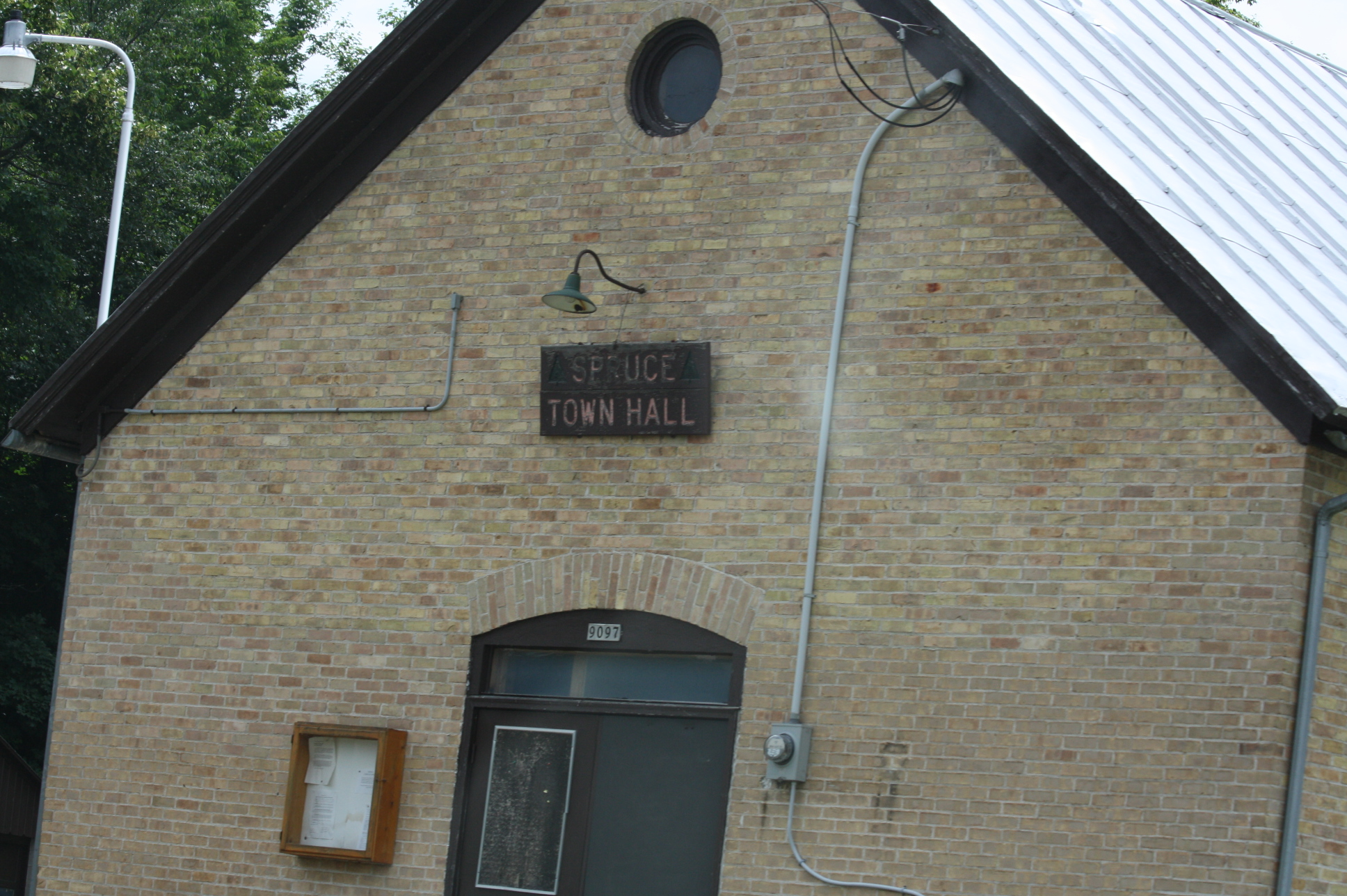
- Town hall

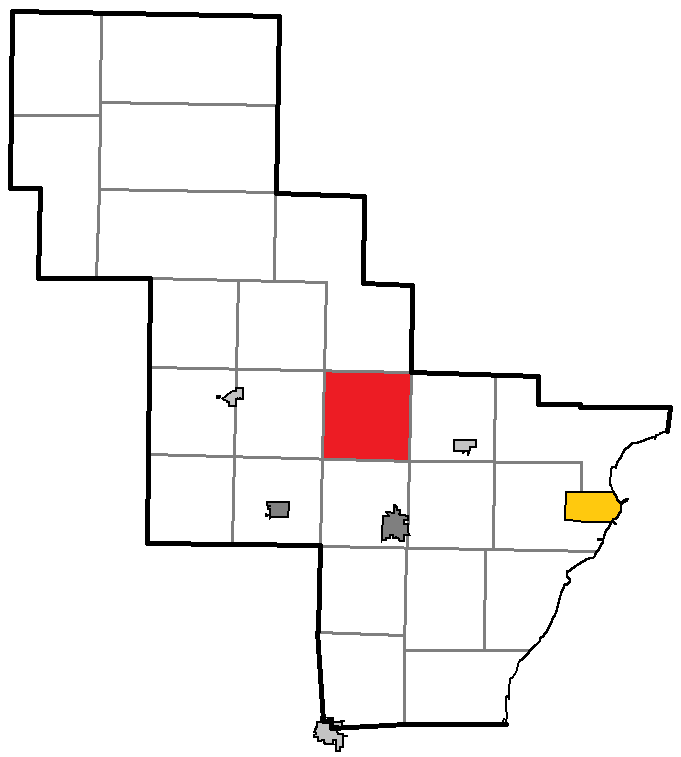
- Location of Spruce, within Oconto County
- Coordinates: 44°59′9″N 88°12′18″W
- Country: United States
- State: Wisconsin
- County: Oconto

Area
  - Total: 35.7 sq mi (92.5 km^{2})
  - Land: 35.2 sq mi (91.1 km^{2})
  - Water: 0.54 sq mi (1.4 km^{2})
- Elevation: 790 ft (240 m)

Population (2020)
  - Total: 918
  - Density: 26.1/sq mi (10.1/km^{2})
- Time zone: UTC-6 (Central (CST))
  - Summer (DST): UTC-5 (CDT)
- FIPS code: 55-76450
- GNIS feature ID: 1584207
- Website: https://www.townofspruce.net/

Spruce is a town in Oconto County, Wisconsin, United States. The population was 918 at the 2020 census. The town of Spruce did have an operating post office from 1884 to 1912. Spruce was established in 1870, and set off from Maple Valley in 1892 along with Brazeau.

== Communities ==
- Kelly Brook is an unincorporated community located at the intersection of County Roads A and K. The town of Kelly Brook had a post office that was established in 1880 and discontinued in 1906. The immediate area only comprises a few houses and is mostly a small settlement.
- Spruce is an unincorporated community located at the intersection of County Roads A and B.

== Geography ==
According to the United States Census Bureau, the town has a total area of 35.7 square miles (92.5 km^{2}), of which 35.2 square miles (91.1 km^{2}) is land and 0.6 square mile (1.4 km^{2}) (1.54%) is water.

== Demographics ==
As of the census of 2000, there were 871 people, 349 households, and 254 families residing in the town. The population density was 24.8 people per square mile (9.6/km^{2}). There were 587 housing units at an average density of 16.7 per square mile (6.4/km^{2}). The racial makeup of the town was 95.52% White, 1.26% Native American, 0.92% Asian, 0.34% from other races, and 1.95% from two or more races. Hispanic or Latino of any race were 1.61% of the population.

There were 349 households, out of which 31.5% had children under the age of 18 living with them, 61.9% were married couples living together, 6.3% had a female householder with no husband present, and 27.2% were non-families. 23.2% of all households were made up of individuals, and 12.0% had someone living alone who was 65 years of age or older. The average household size was 2.50 and the average family size was 2.93.

In the town, the population was spread out, with 25.1% under the age of 18, 5.7% from 18 to 24, 27.3% from 25 to 44, 21.2% from 45 to 64, and 20.6% who were 65 years of age or older. The median age was 40 years. For every 100 females, there were 101.6 males. For every 100 females age 18 and over, there were 101.9 males.

The median income for a household in the town was $35,658, and the median income for a family was $43,125. Males had a median income of $29,444 versus $21,250 for females. The per capita income for the town was $18,759. About 3.5% of families and 6.5% of the population were below the poverty line, including 7.7% of those under age 18 and 6.2% of those age 65 or over.

== Notable people ==
- Bernard E. Brandt, farmer and Wisconsin state legislator, lived in the town
- Milton McDougal, farmer and Wisconsin state legislator, was born in the town
