= Sadama =

Subdistrict of Tallinn, Estonia

Coordinates: 59°26′24.09″N 24°45′49.39″E

- Subdistrict of Tallinn
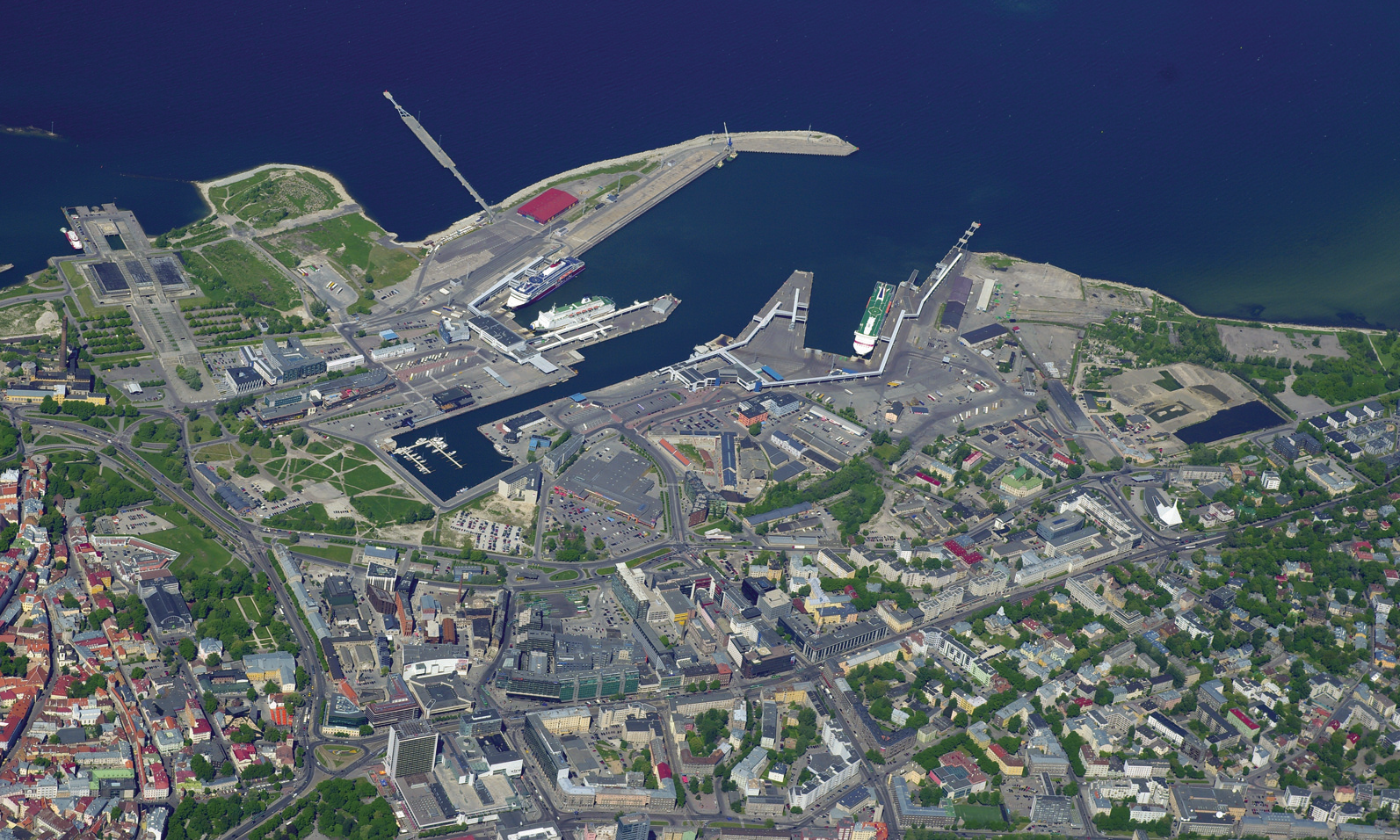
- Aerial view of Sadama area.

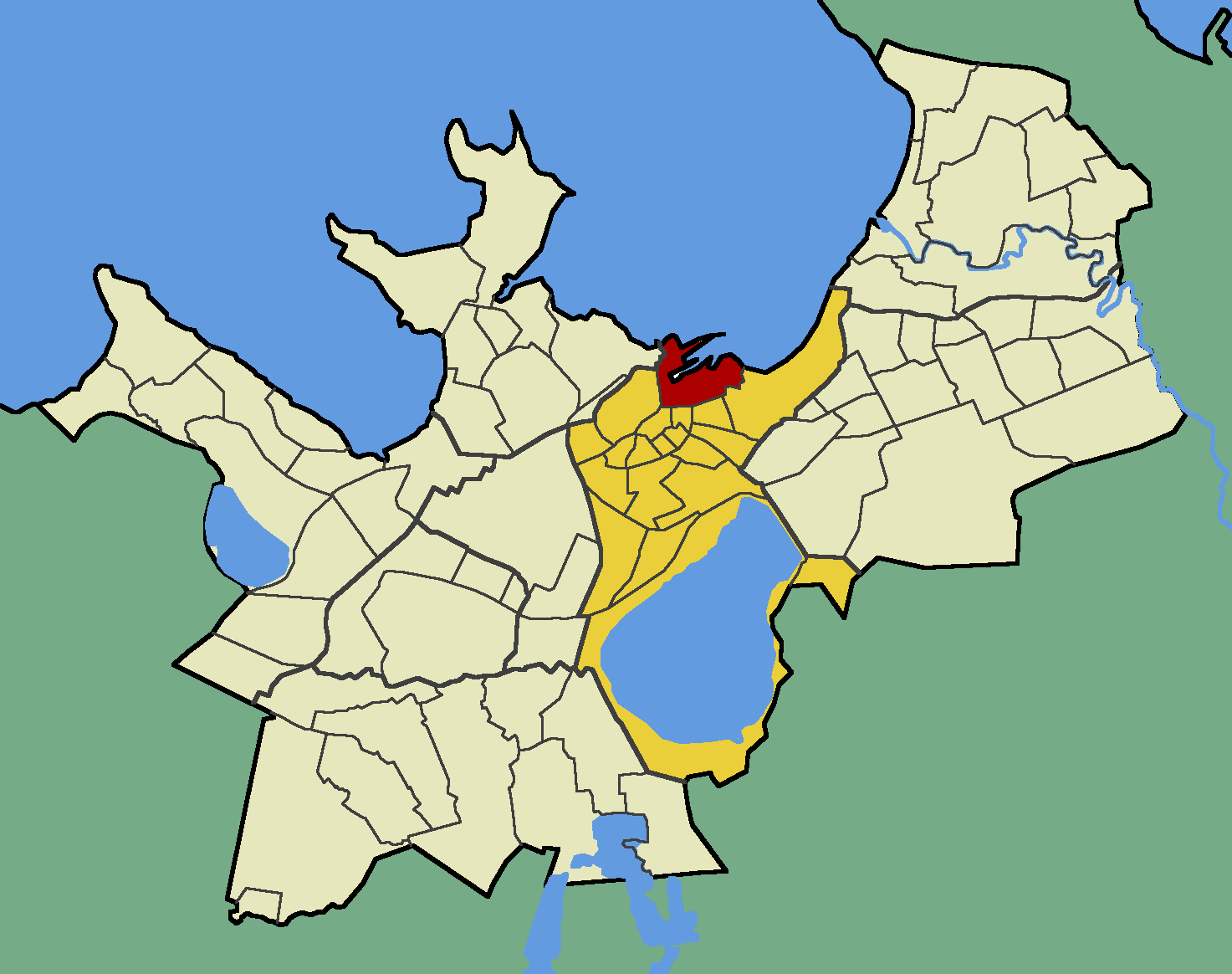
- Sadama within the district of Kesklinn (Midtown).
- Country: Estonia
- County: Harju County
- City: Tallinn
- District: Kesklinn

Population (01.01.2014)
  - Total: 2,951

Sadama (Estonian for "Harbour") is a subdistrict (asum) in the district of Kesklinn (Midtown), Tallinn, the capital of Estonia. It has a population of 2,951 (As of 1 January 2014).

== Gallery ==
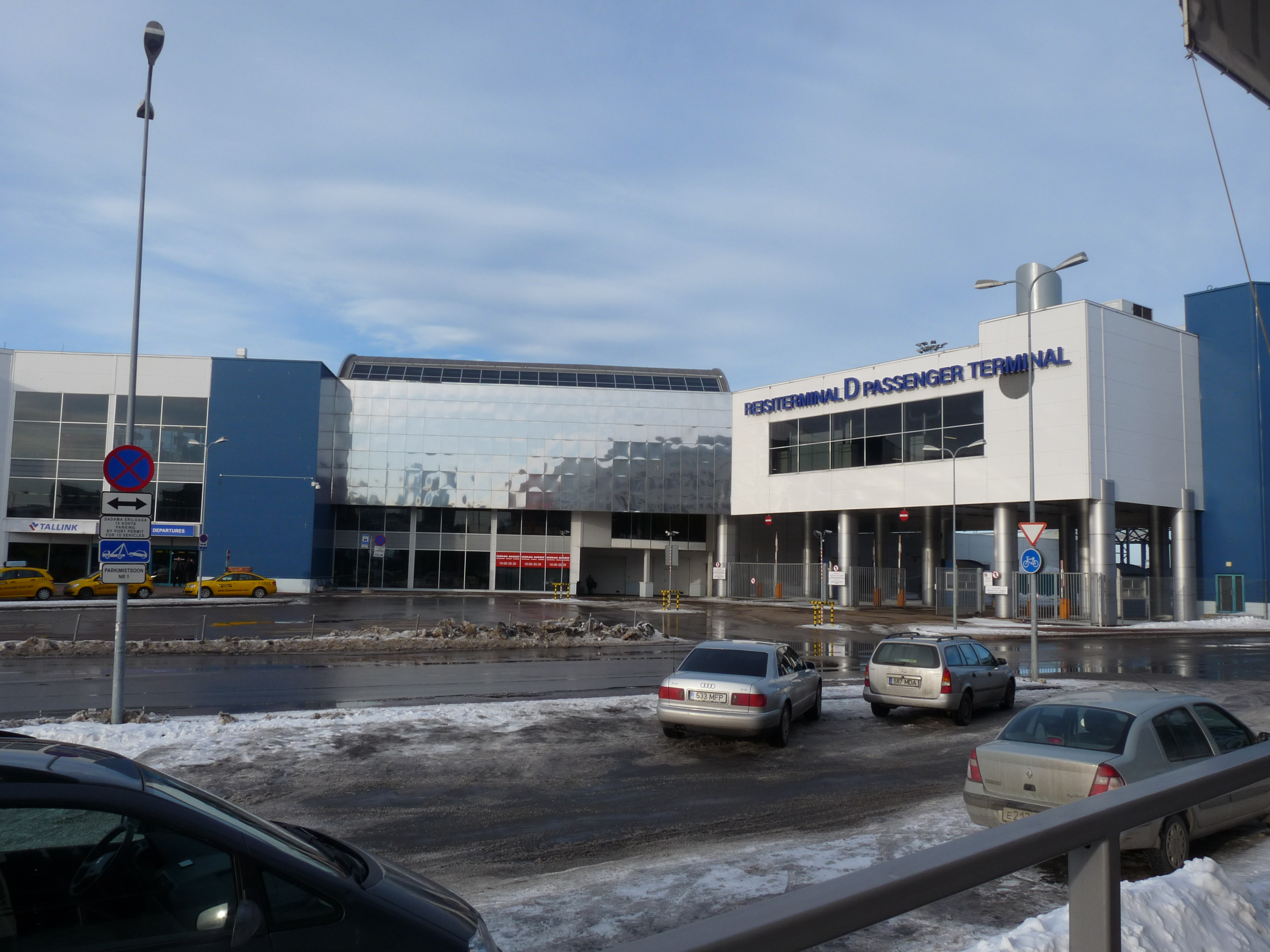
Former D-terminal in Old City harbour in Tallinn at 2010

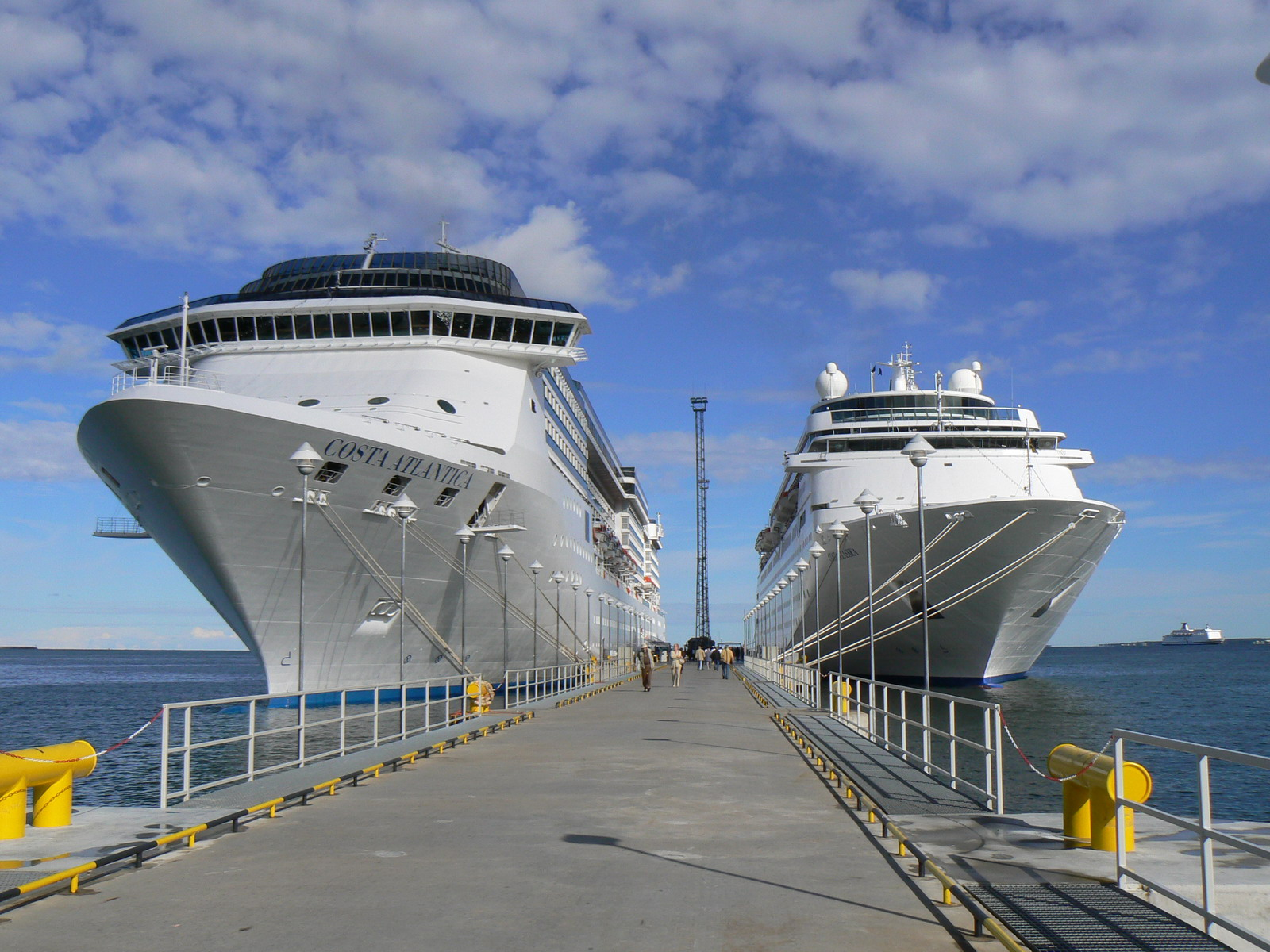
Cruise ships at cruise quay in Old City harbour in Tallinn

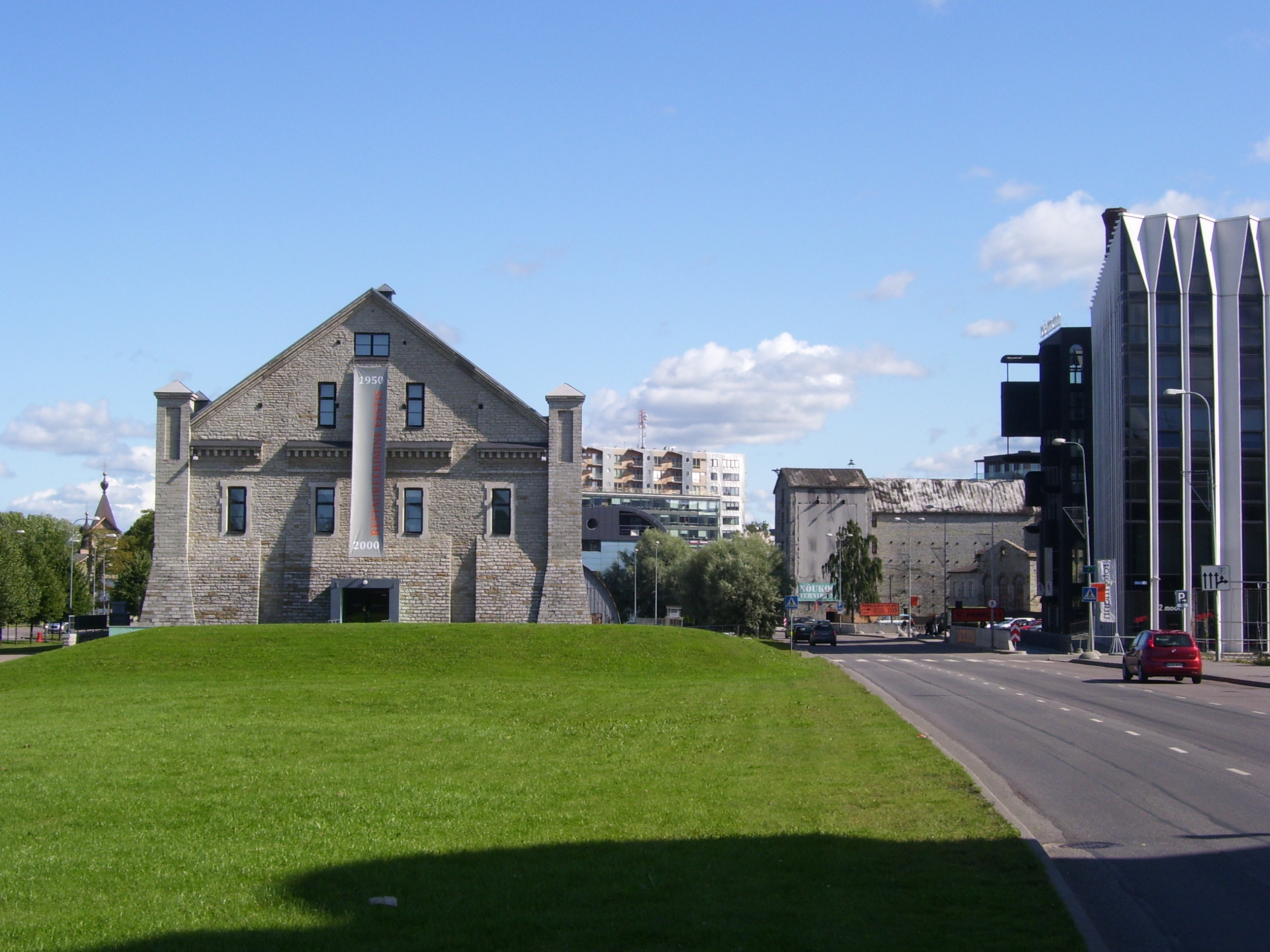
Rotermann Salt Storage, now the Estonian Architecture Museum

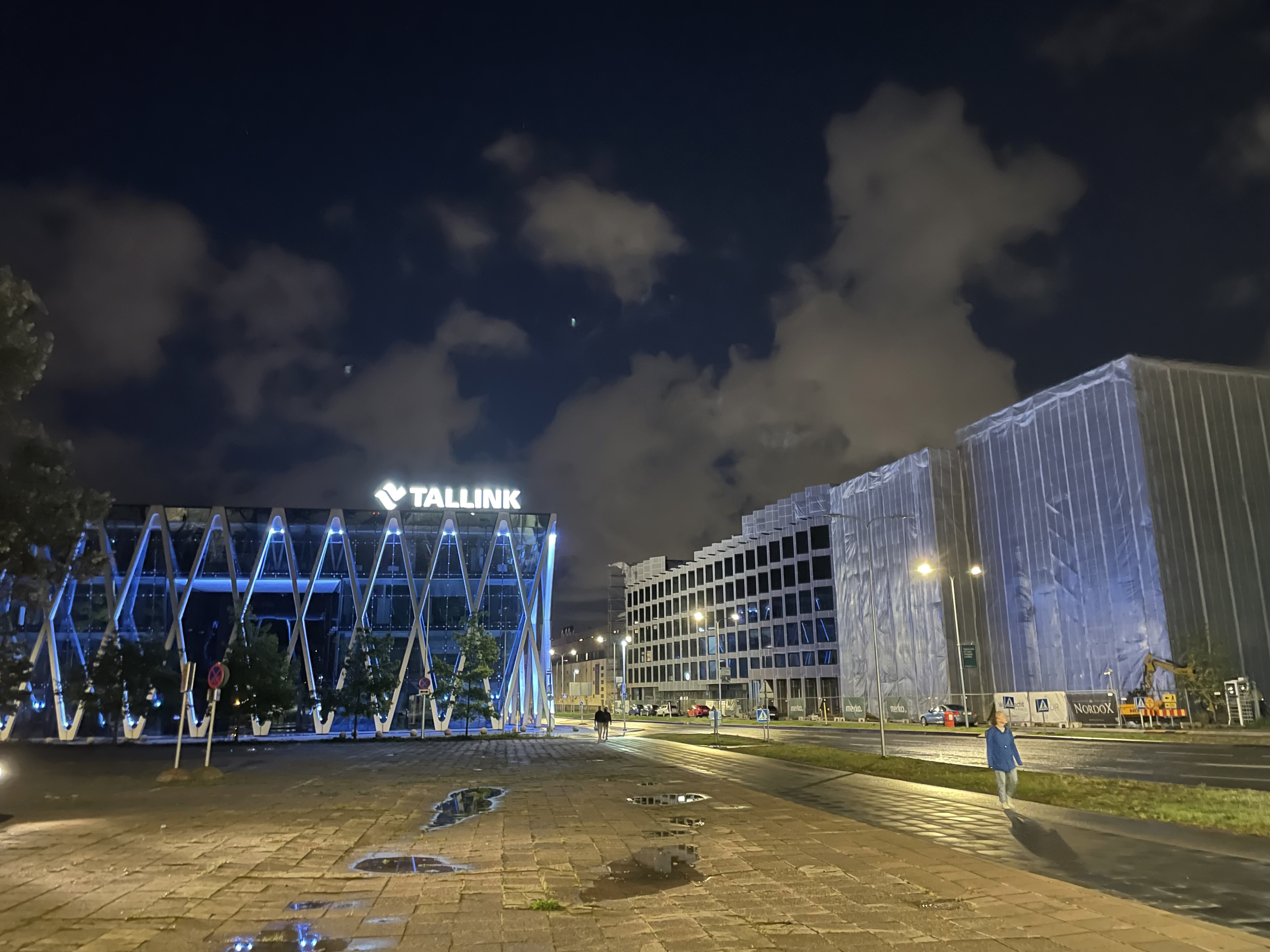
Tallink Express Hotel and Sadama street

== See also ==
- Tallinn Passenger Port
- Foorum
