= Sibulaküla =

Subdistrict of Tallinn, Estonia

Coordinates: 59°25′52.97″N 24°45′10.75″E

- Subdistrict of Tallinn
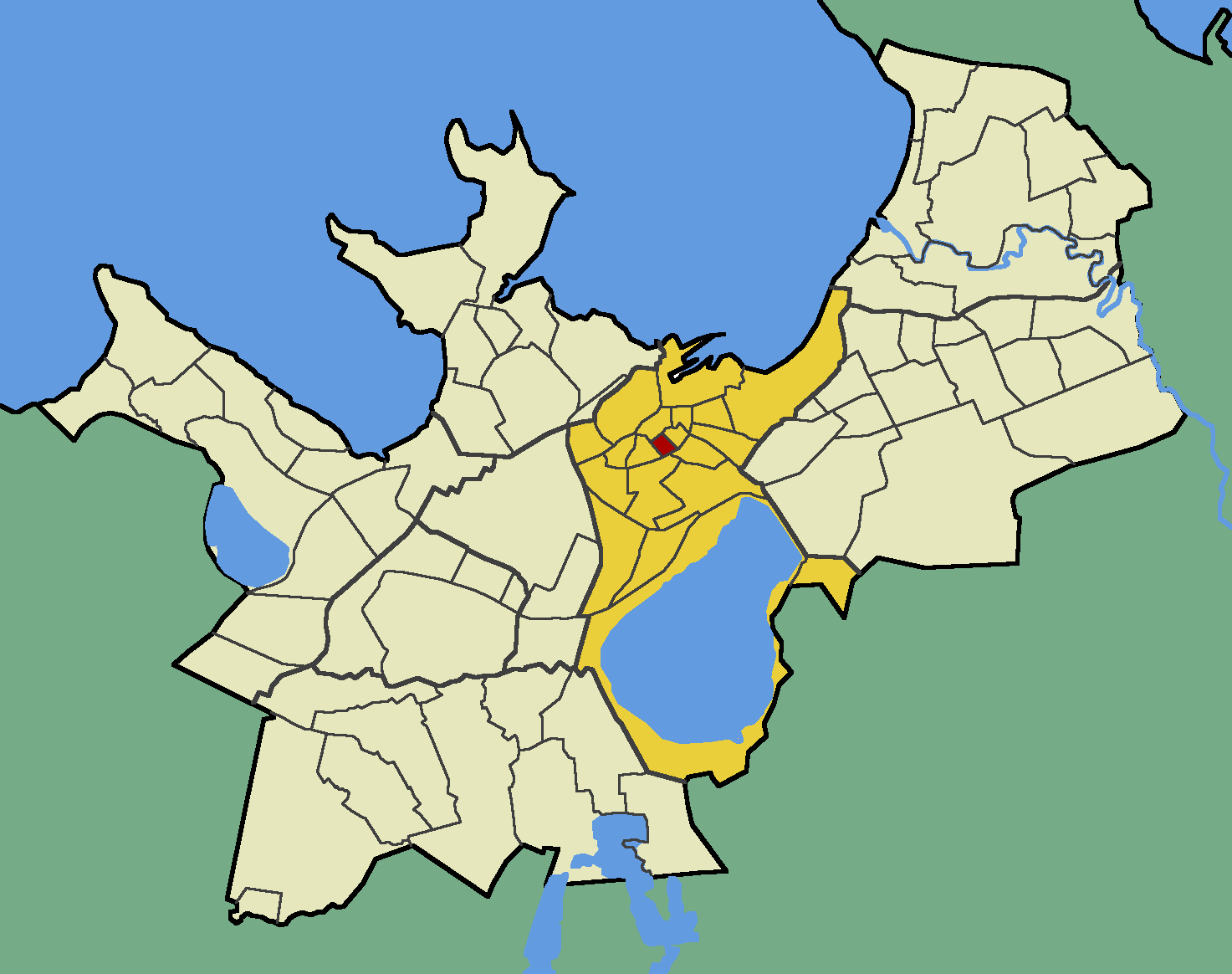
- Sibulaküla within the district of Kesklinn (Midtown).
- Country: Estonia
- County: Harju County
- City: Tallinn
- District: Kesklinn

Population (01.01.2014)
  - Total: Mark

Sibulaküla (Estonian for "Onion Village") is a subdistrict (asum) in the district of Kesklinn (Midtown), Tallinn, the capital of Estonia. It has a population of 2,120 (As of 1 January 2014).

== Gallery ==
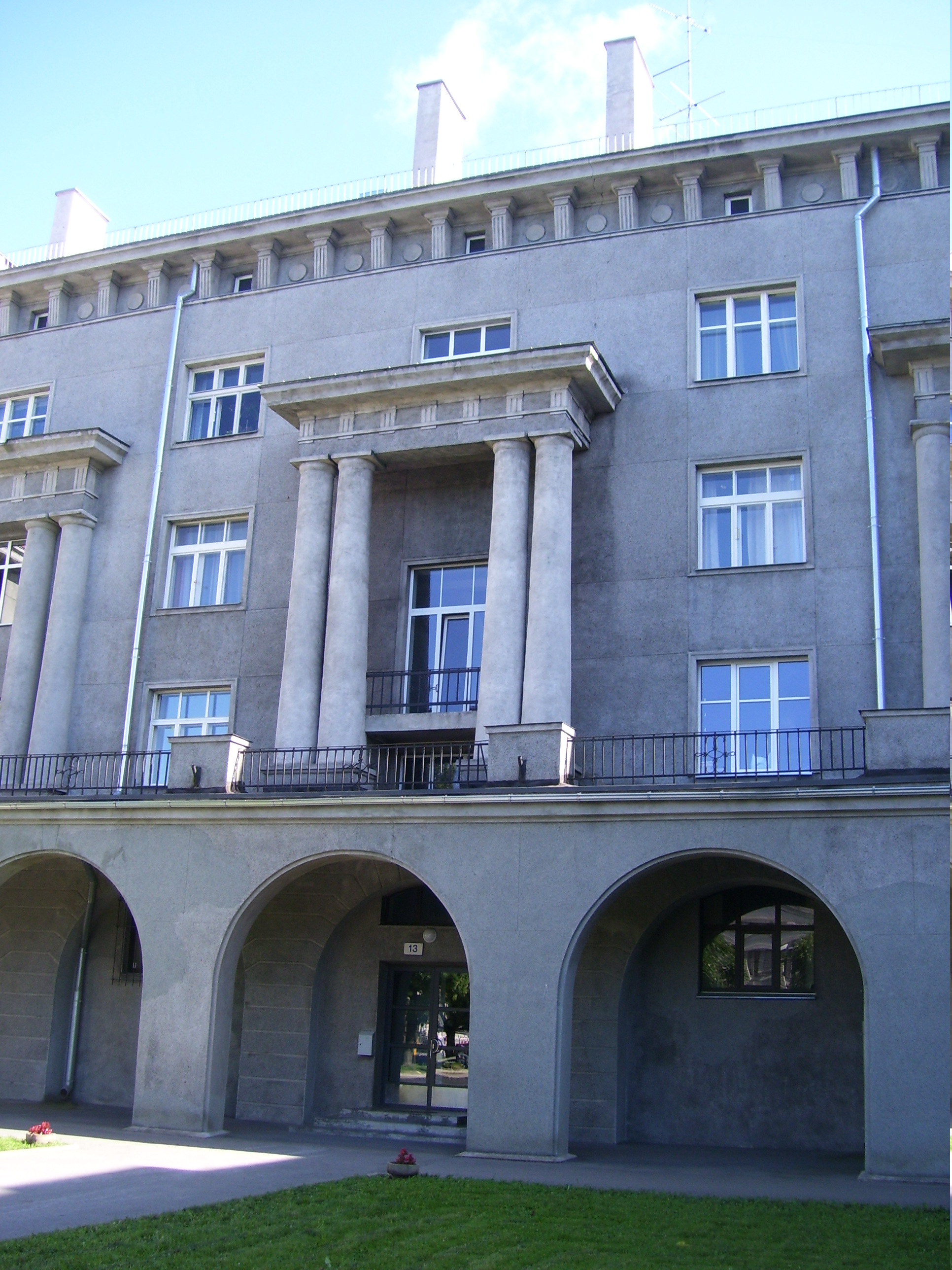

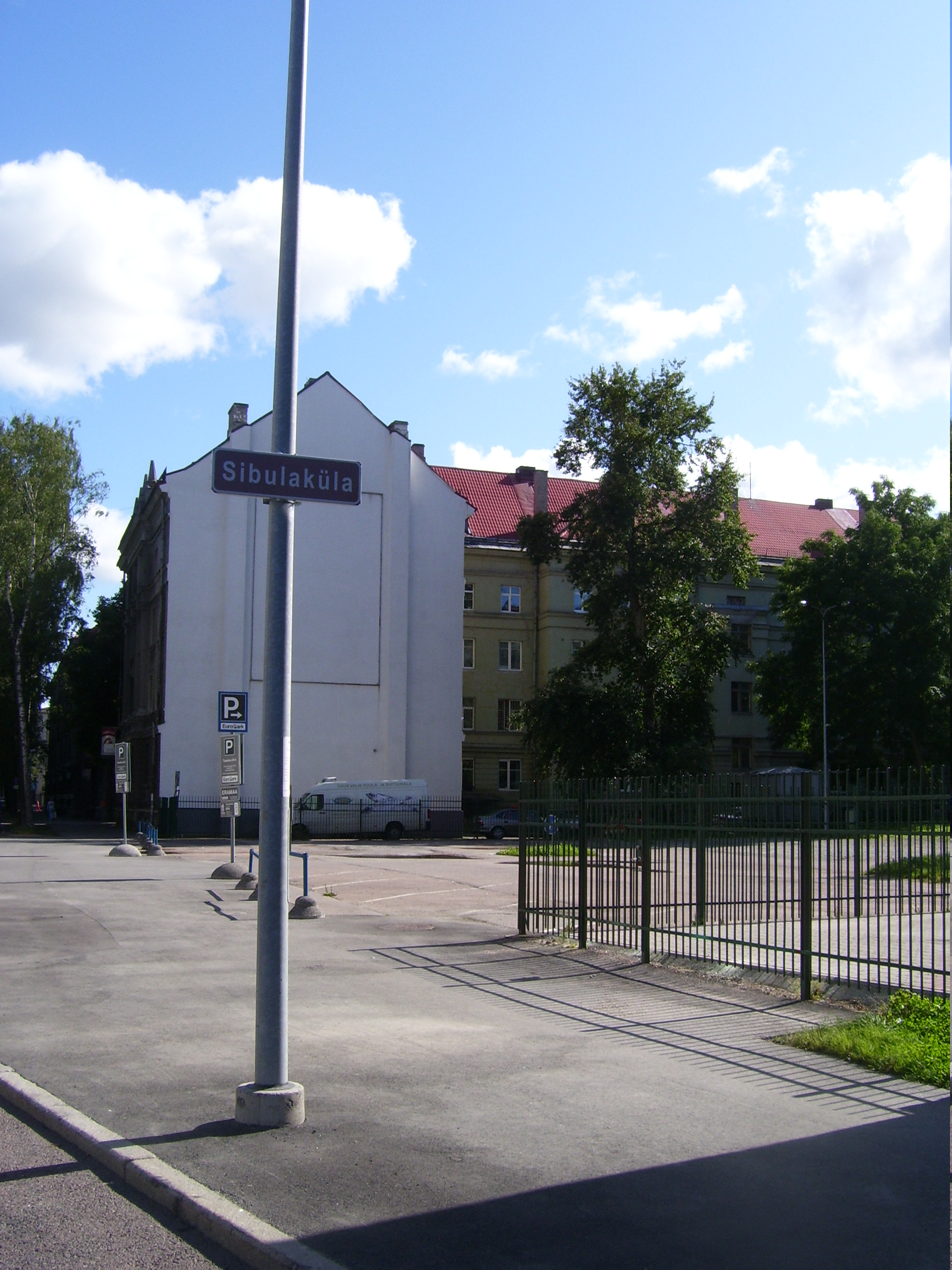
