= Kompassi =

Subdistrict of Tallinn, Estonia

Coordinates: 59°26′8.46″N 24°45′39.31″E

- Subdistrict of Tallinn
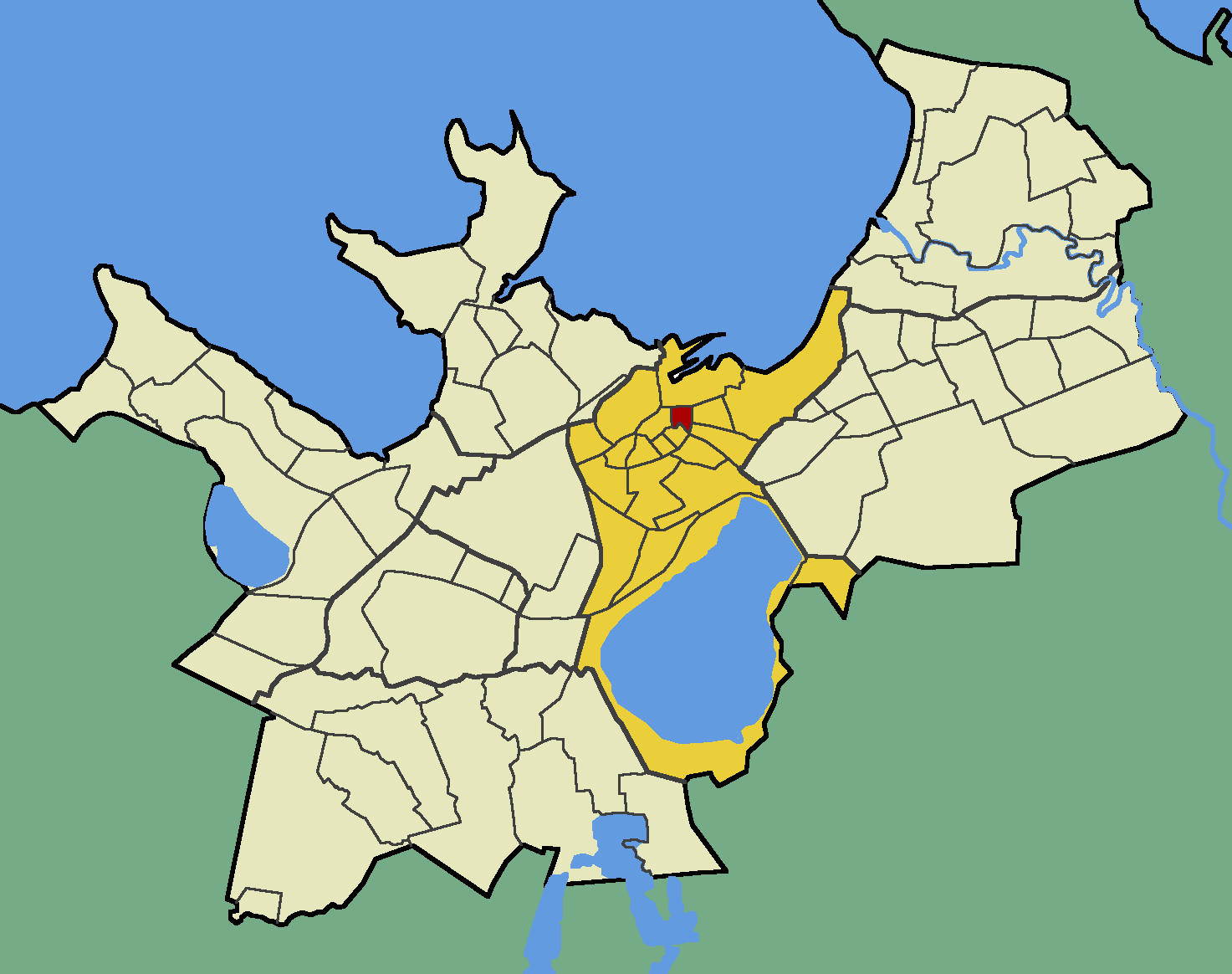
- Kompassi within the district of Kesklinn (Midtown).
- Country: Estonia
- County: Harju County
- City: Tallinn
- District: Kesklinn

Population (01.01.2014)
  - Total: 2,066

Kompassi (Estonian for "Compass") is a subdistrict (asum) in the district of Kesklinn (Midtown), Tallinn, the capital of Estonia. It has a population of 2,066 (As of 1 January 2014).

The Estonian Firefighting Museum is located in Kompassi inside a former fire department on Raua street.

== Gallery ==
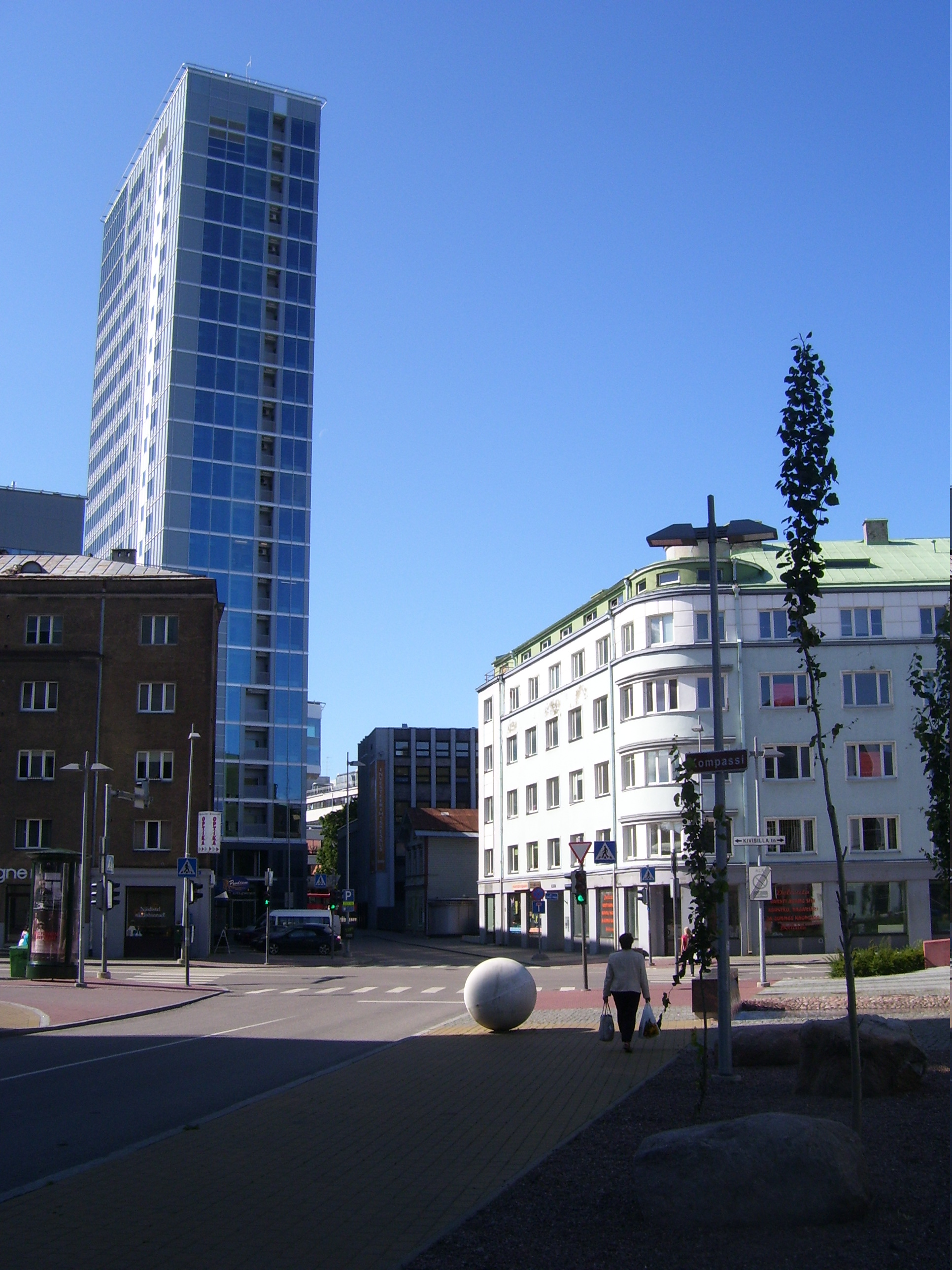

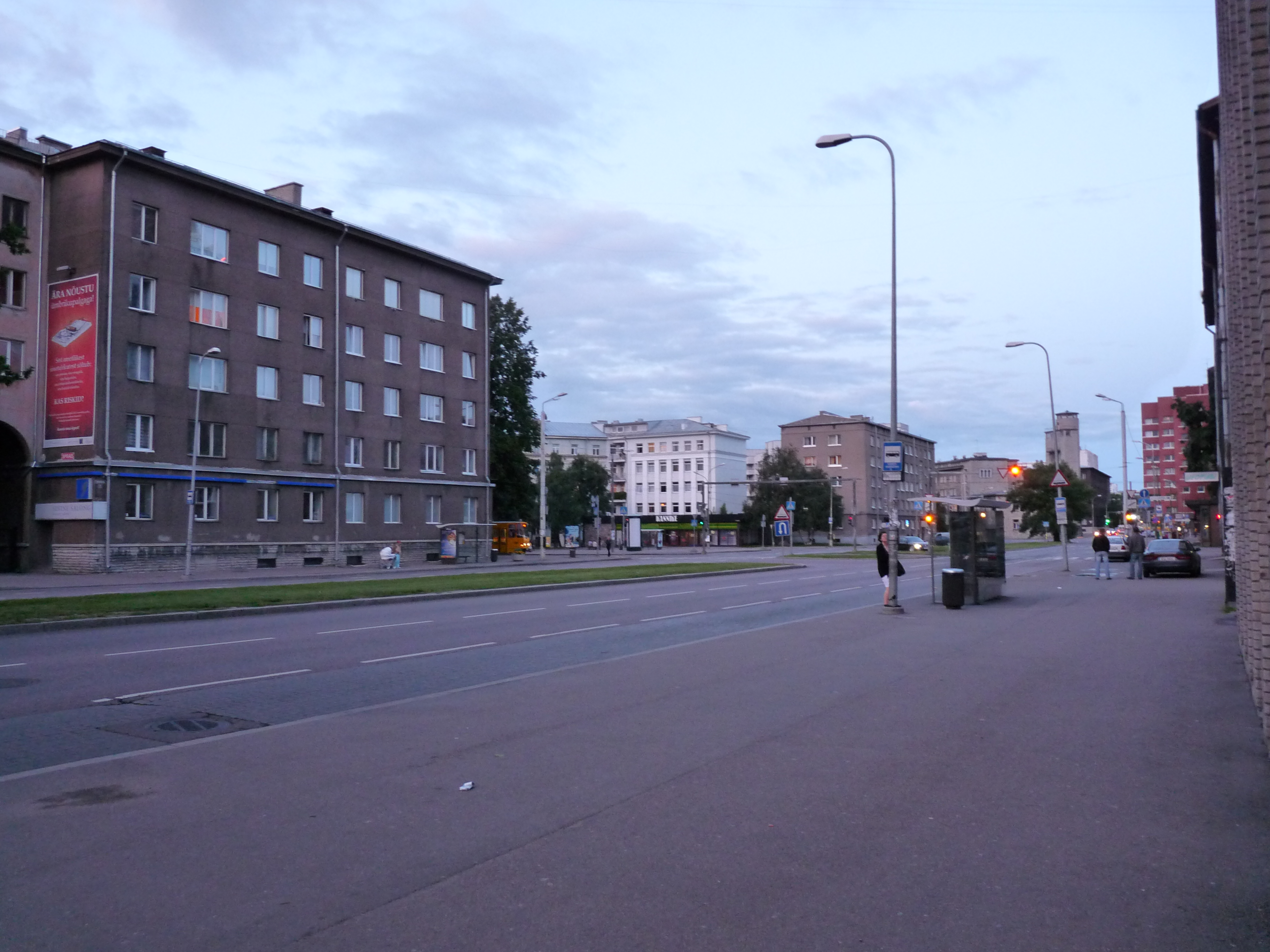
Gonsiori street
