= Südalinn =

Subdistrict of Tallinn, Estonia

Coordinates: 59°26′3.31″N 24°45′6.04″E

- Subdistrict of Tallinn
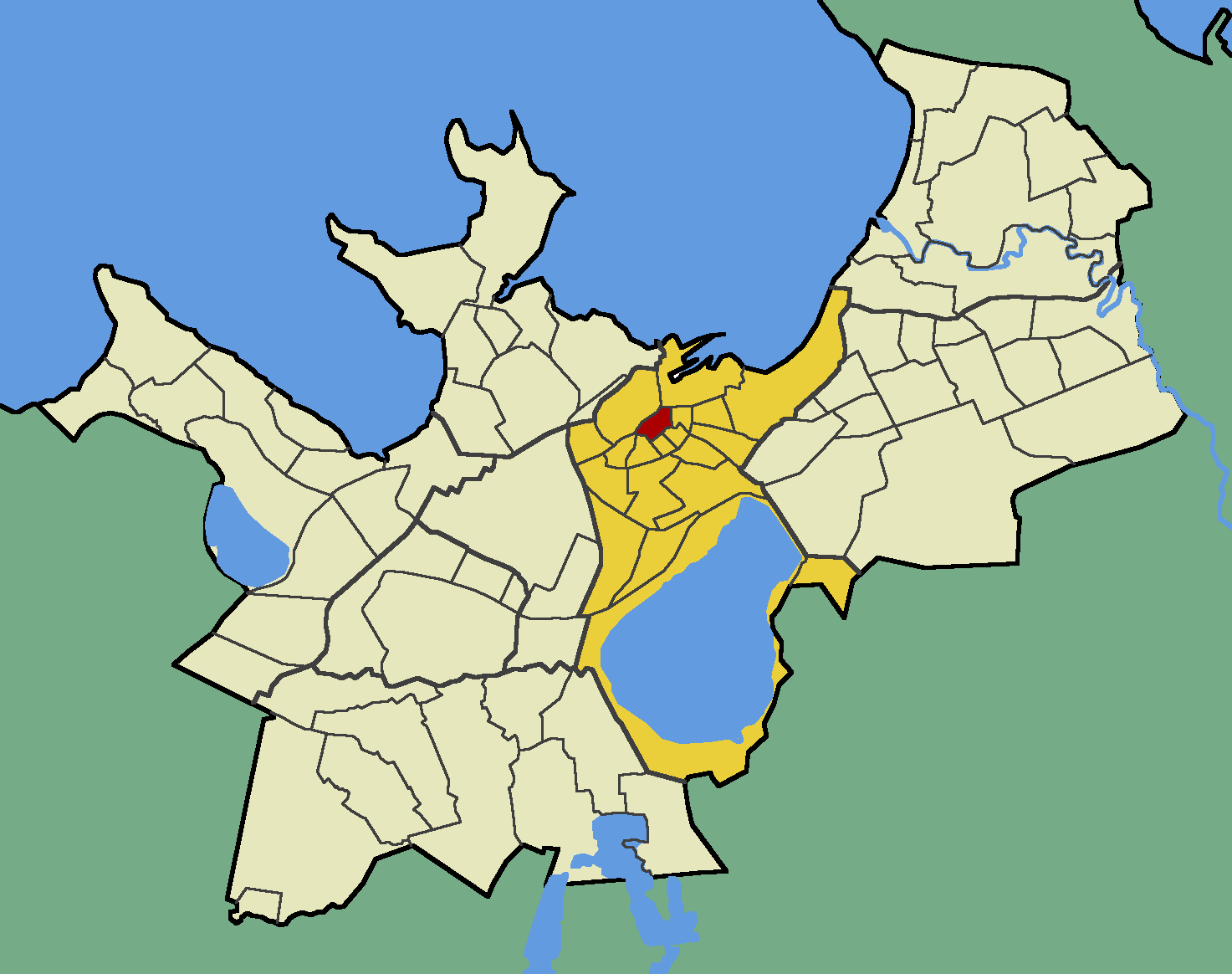
- Südalinn within the district of Kesklinn (Midtown).
- Country: Estonia
- County: Harju County
- City: Tallinn
- District: Kesklinn

Population (01.01.2014)
  - Total: 169

Südalinn (Estonian for Downtown, literally "Heart Town") is a subdistrict (Estonian: asum) in the district of Kesklinn (Midtown), Tallinn, the capital of Estonia. It has a population of 169 (As of 1 January 2014).

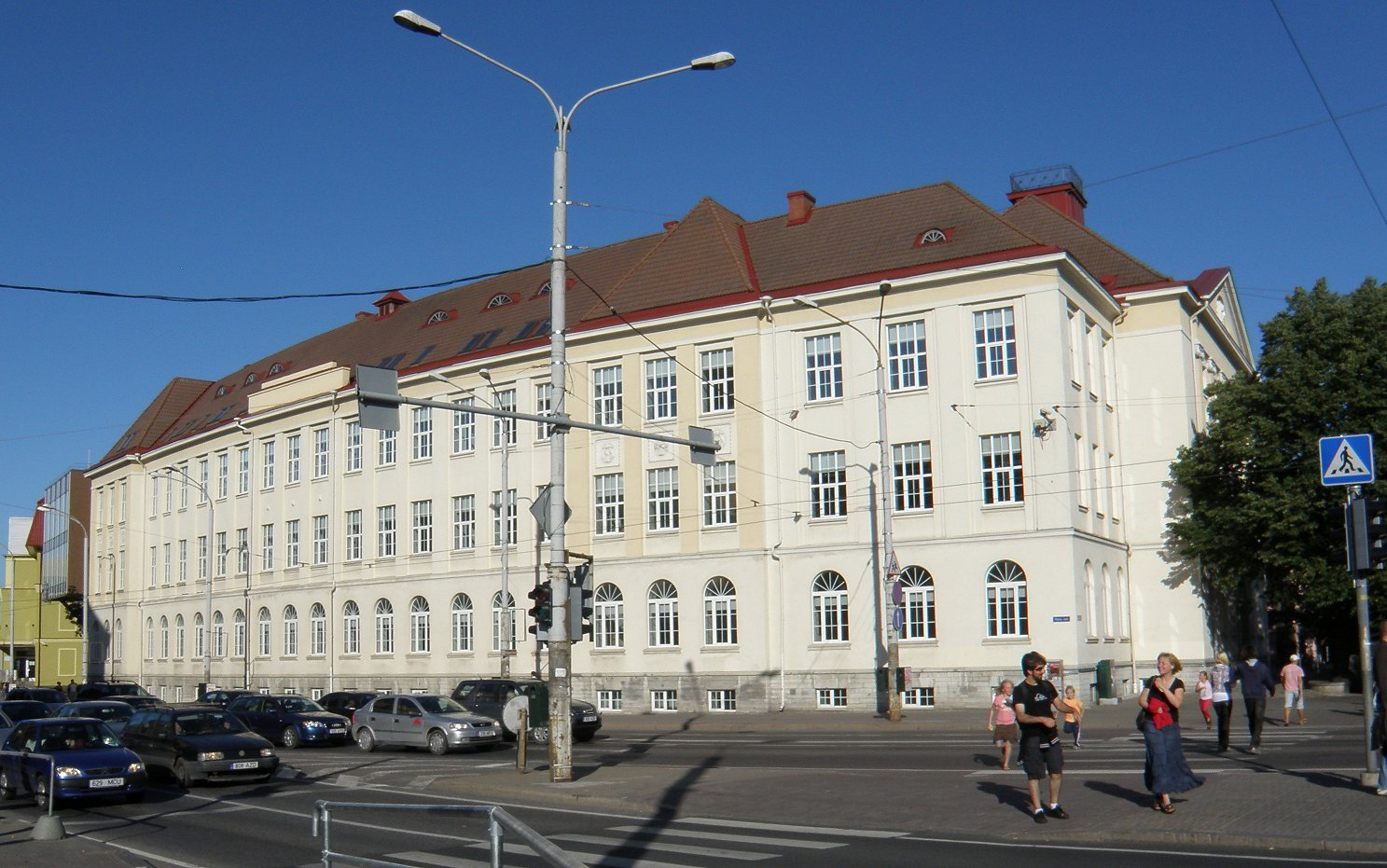
Tallinn English College
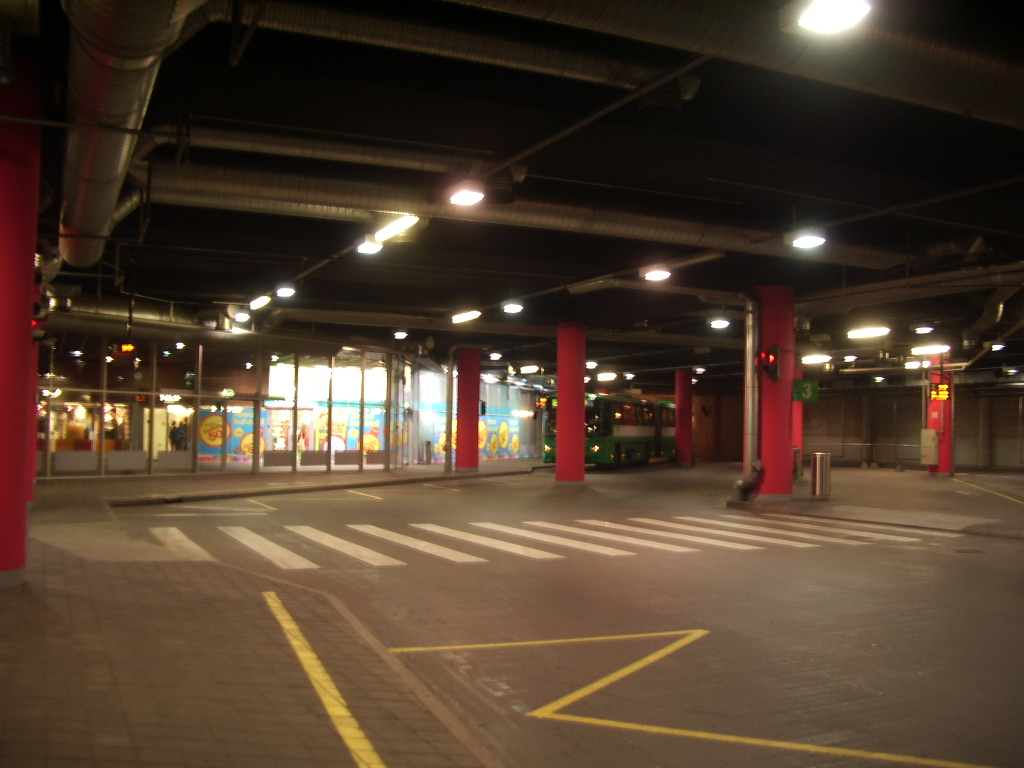
Viru Centre bus terminal is the most important spot in Tallinn bus system.

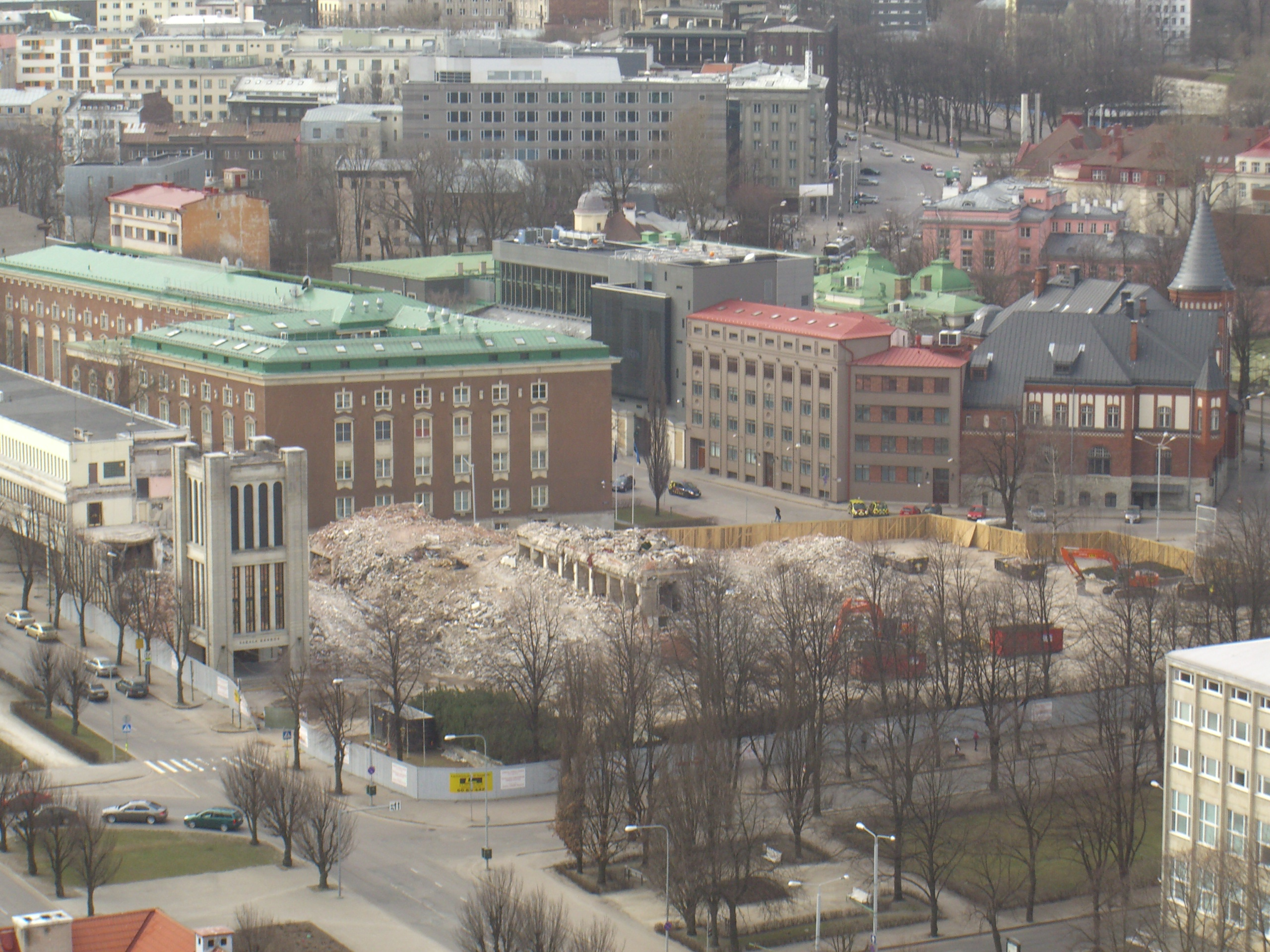
The demolition of Sakala centre, now the site of newly built Solaris shopping centre

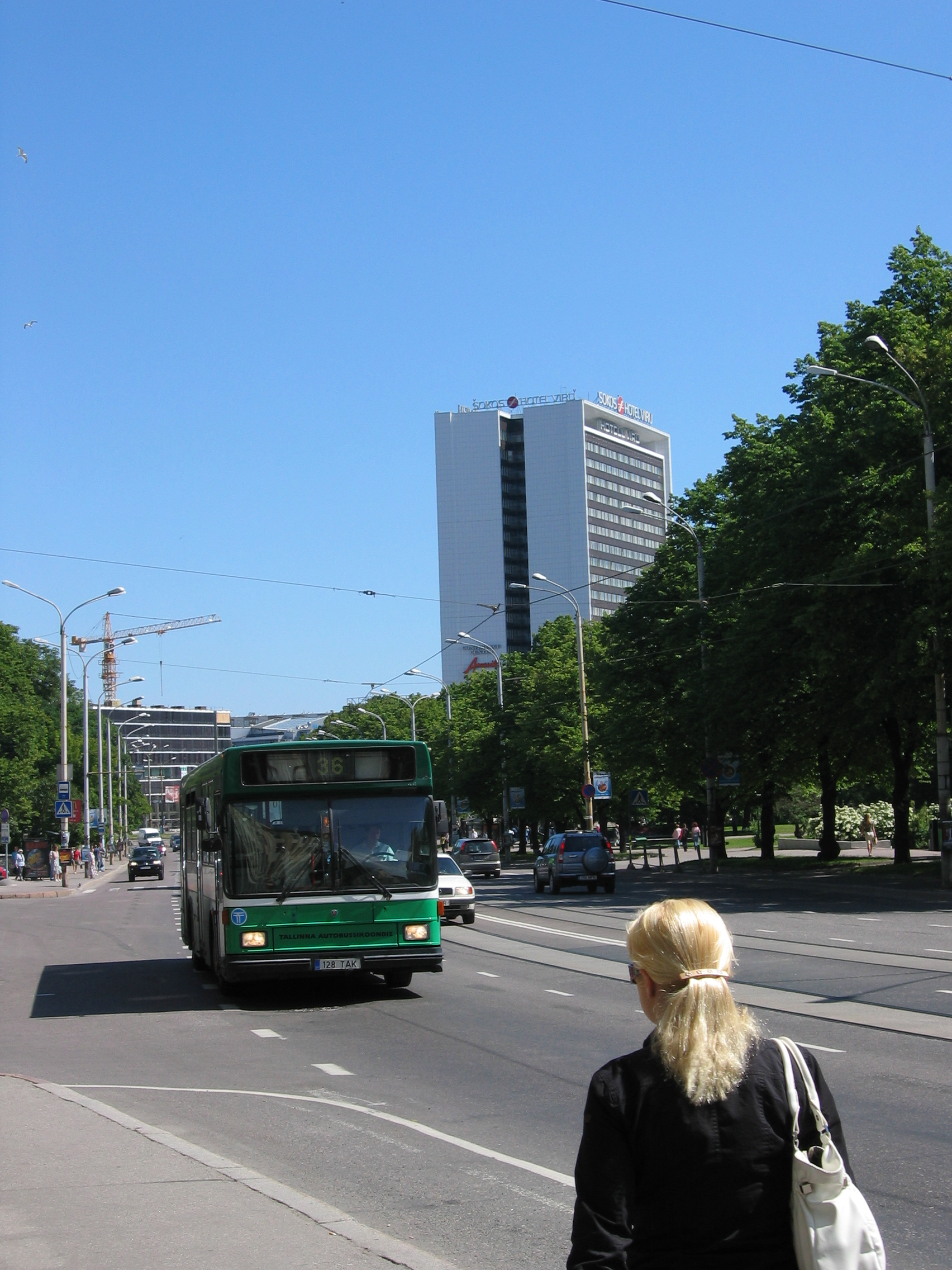
Beginning of Pärnu road
