= Luite =

Subdistrict of Tallinn, Estonia

Coordinates: 59°24′54.53″N 24°45′19.69″E

- Subdistrict of Tallinn
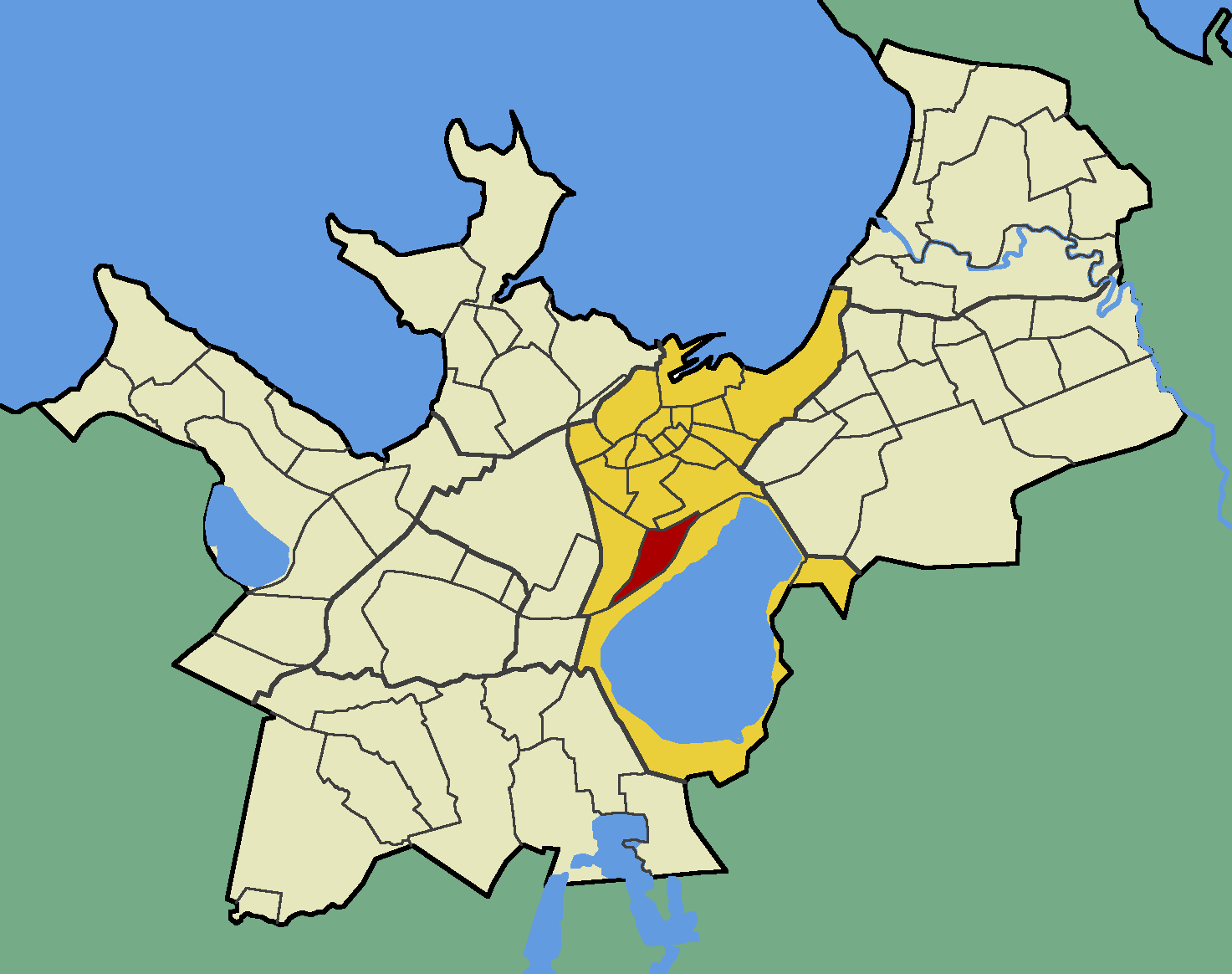
- Luite within the district of Kesklinn (Midtown).
- Country: Estonia
- County: Harju County
- City: Tallinn
- District: Kesklinn

Population (01.01.2014)
  - Total: 813

Luite (Estonian for "Dune") is a subdistrict (asum) in the district of Kesklinn (Midtown), Tallinn, the capital of Estonia. It has a population of 813 (As of 1 January 2014).

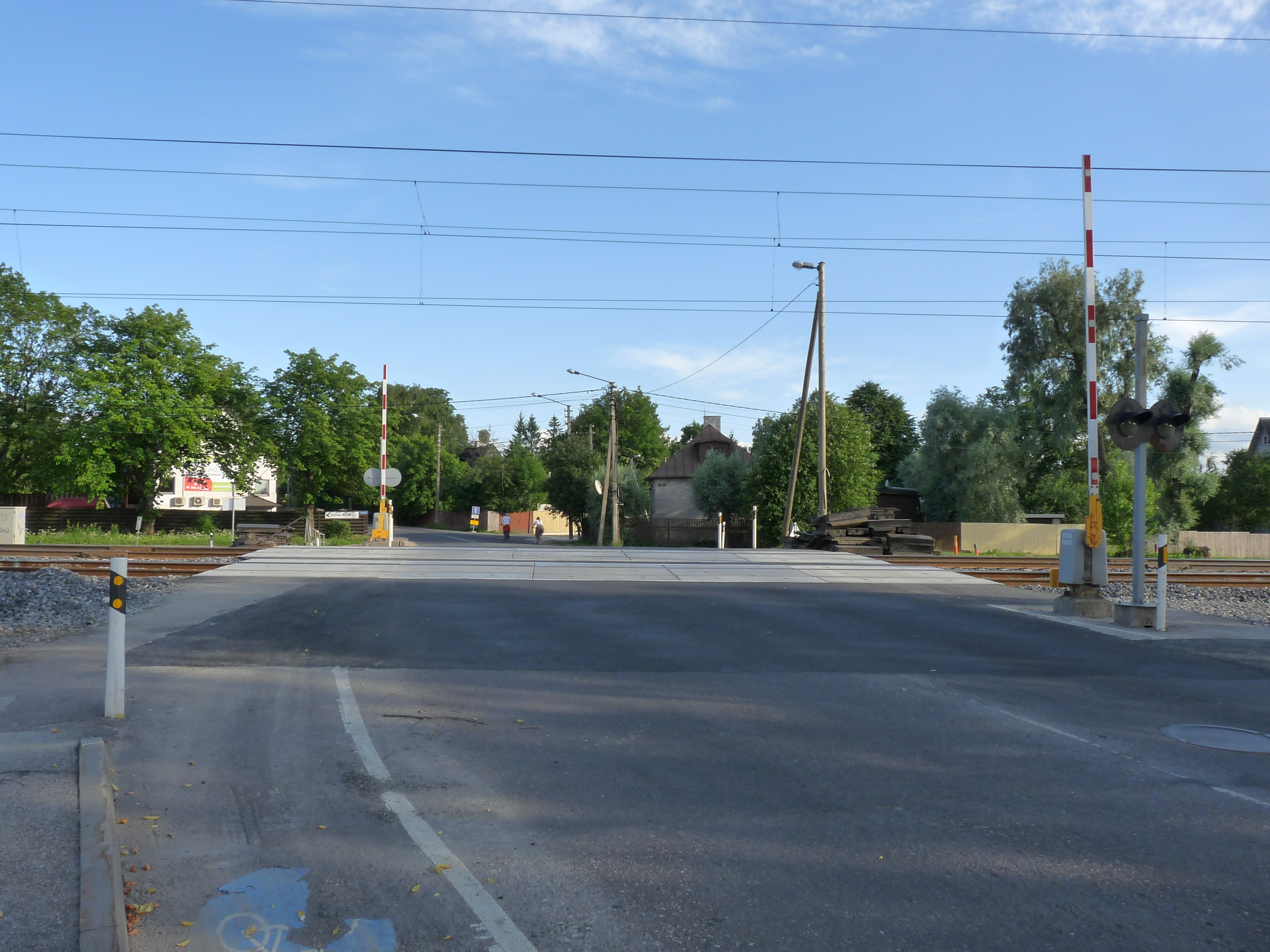

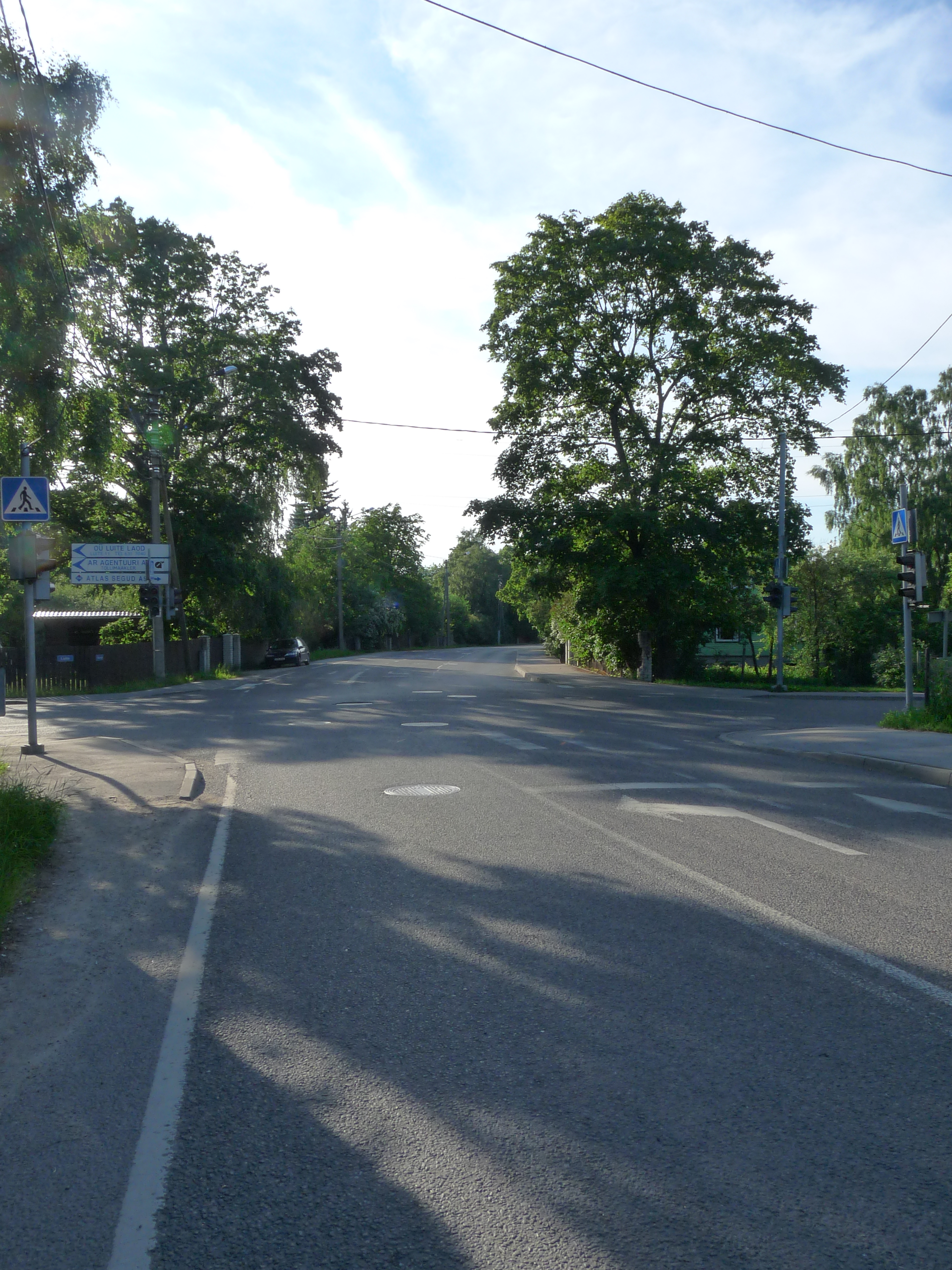
