= Ülemistejärve =

Subdistrict of Tallinn, Estonia

- Subdistrict of Tallinn
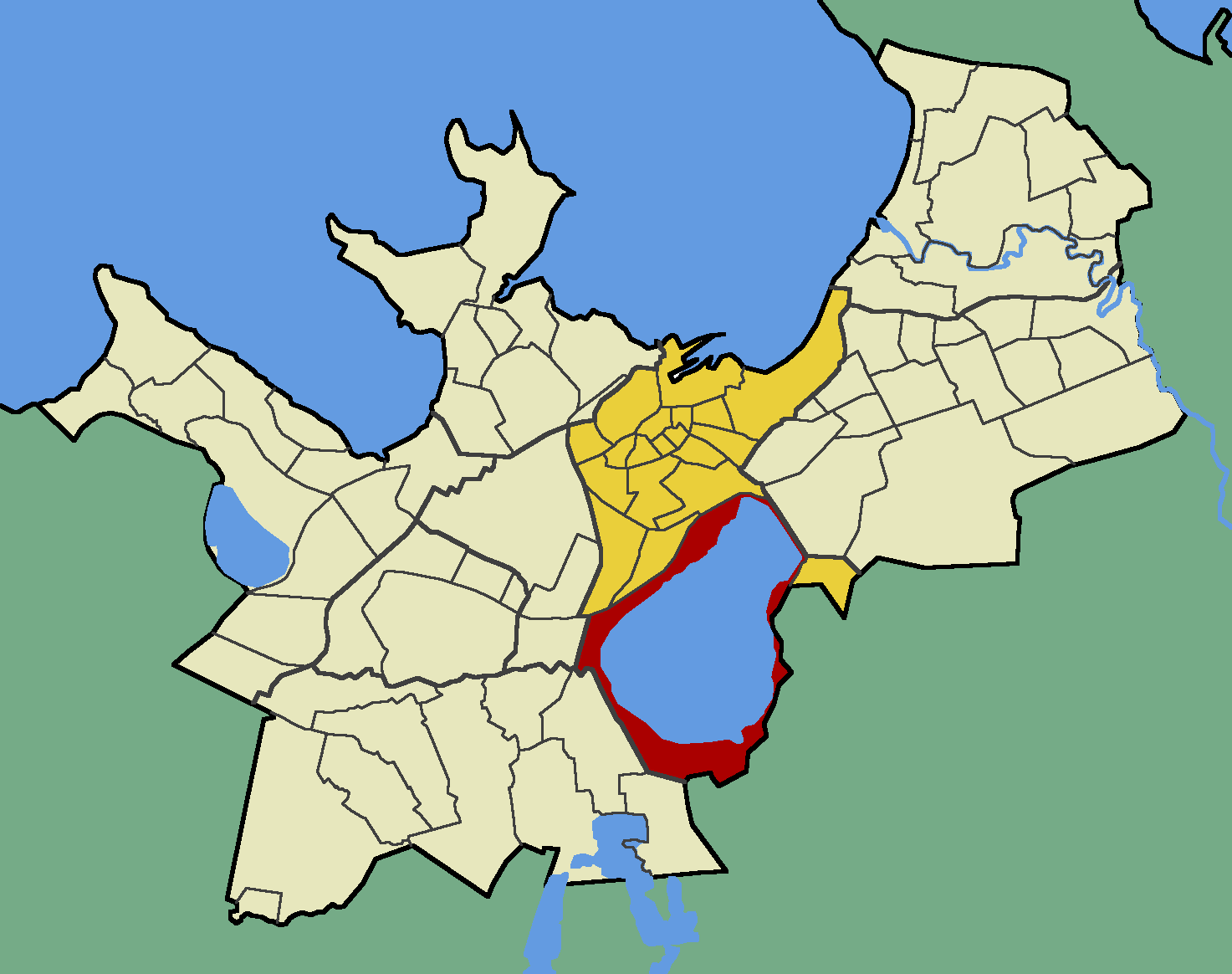
- Ülemistejärve within the district of Kesklinn (Midtown).
- Country: Estonia
- County: Harju County
- City: Tallinn
- District: Kesklinn

Ülemistejärve is a subdistrict (Estonian: asum) in the district of Kesklinn (Midtown), Tallinn, the capital of Estonia. It is named after Ülemiste Lake.
