= Tatari, Tallinn =

Subdistrict of Tallinn, Estonia

Coordinates: 59°25′49.8″N 24°44′51.92″E

Tatari
- Subdistrict of Tallinn
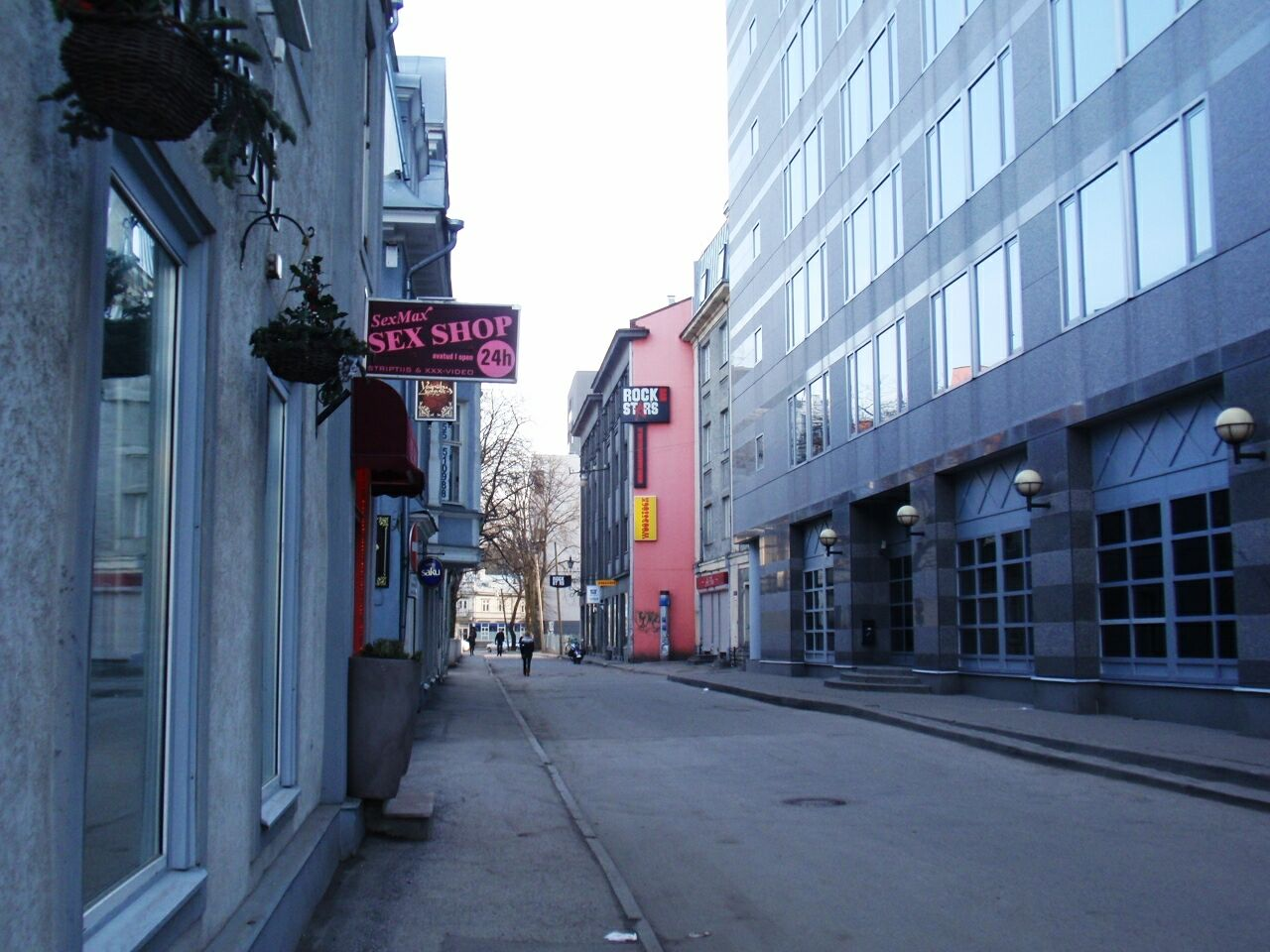
- Tatari street near the Freedom Square.

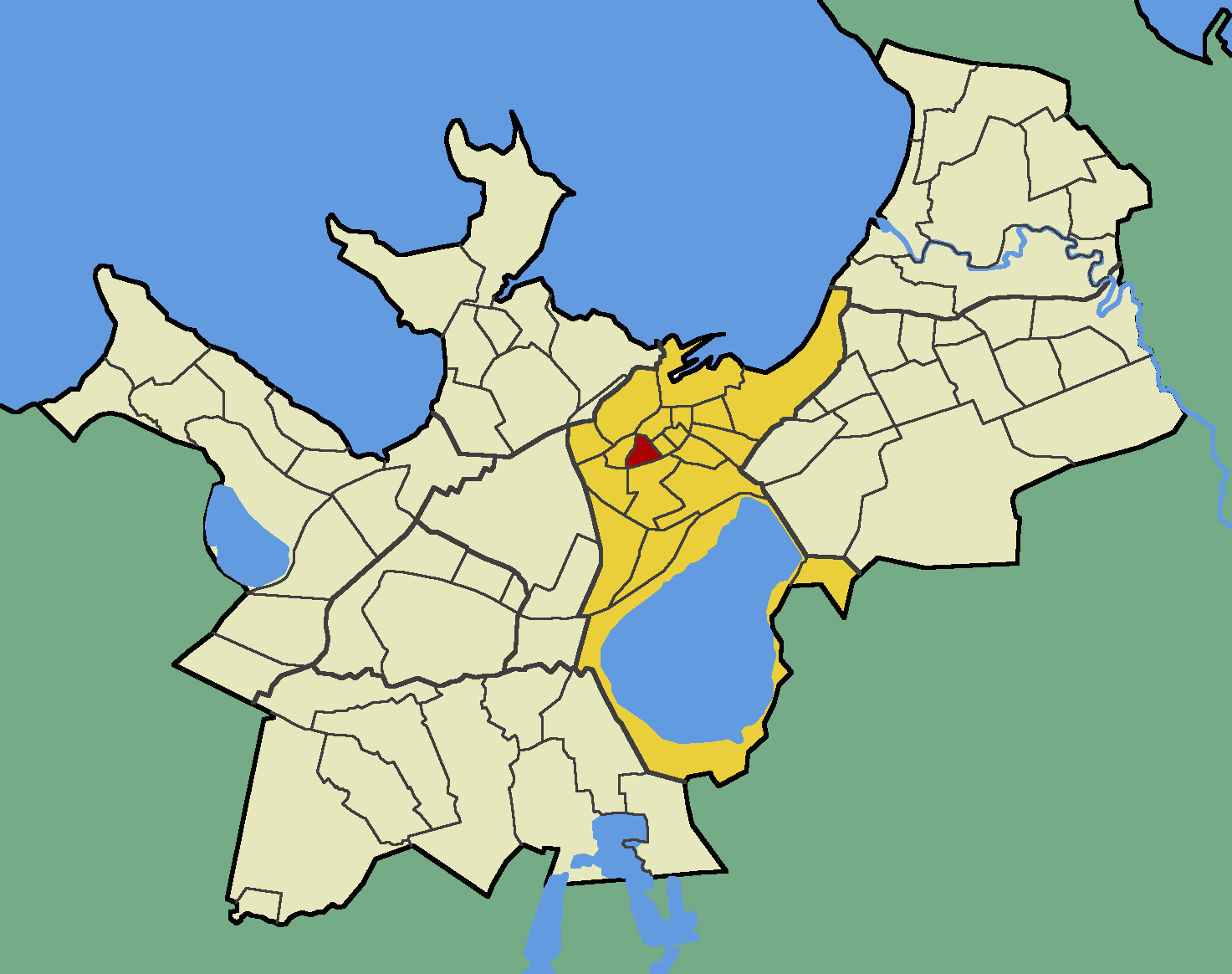
- Tatari within the district of Kesklinn (Midtown).
- Country: Estonia
- County: Harju County
- City: Tallinn
- District: Kesklinn

Population (01.01.2014)
  - Total: 2,098

Tatari (Estonian for "Tatar") is a subdistrict (Estonian: asum) in the district of Kesklinn (Midtown), Tallinn, the capital of Estonia. It has a population of 2,098 (As of 1 January 2014).

== Landmarks and institutions ==
- Estonian Academy of Music and Theatre (Rävala pst 16)
- Cinema "Kosmos" (Pärnu mnt 45)

== Gallery ==
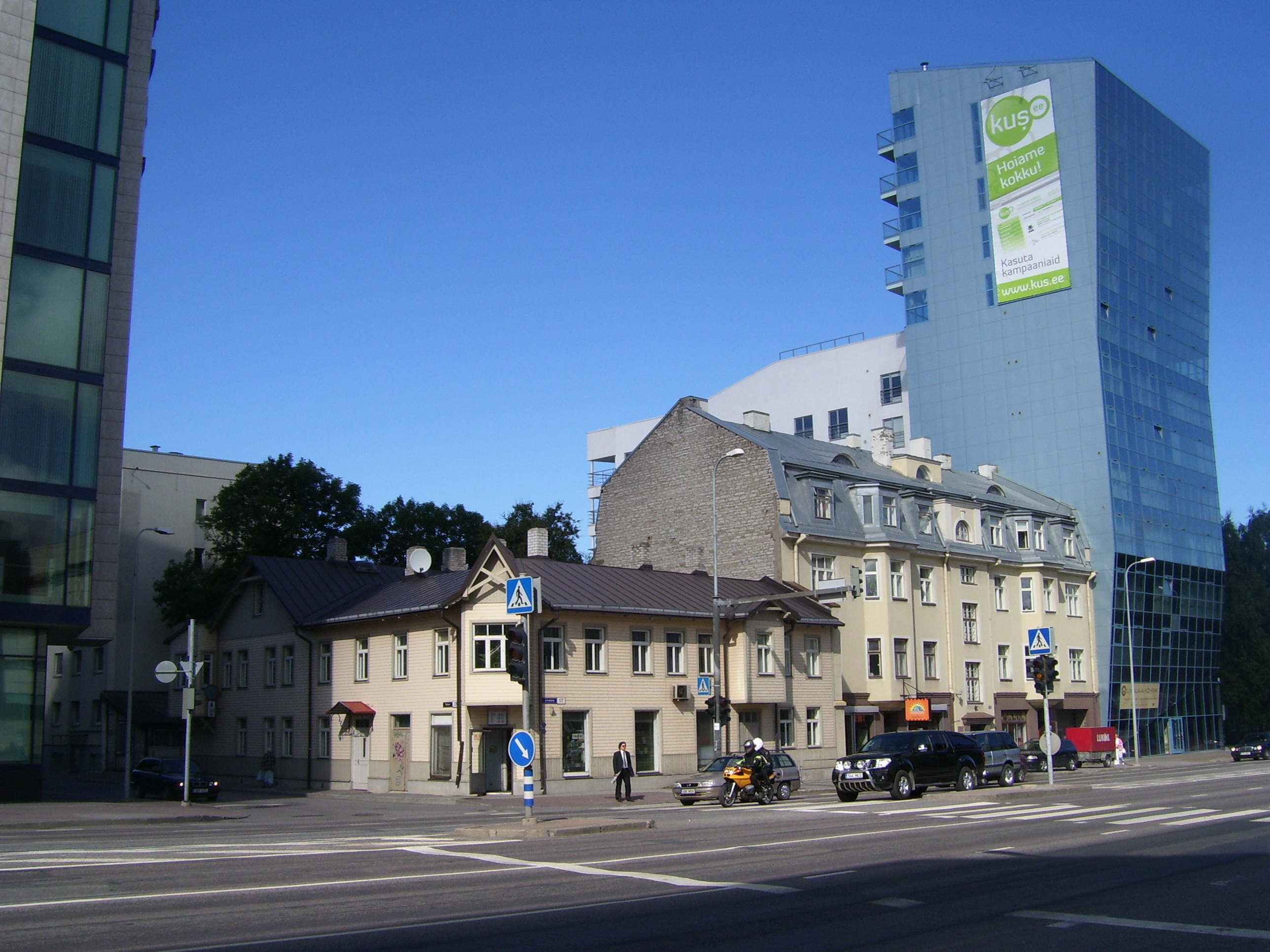

Cinema "Kosmos"
