= Keldrimäe =

Subdistrict of Tallinn, Estonia

Coordinates: 59°25′46.24″N 24°46′2.29″E

- Subdistrict of Tallinn
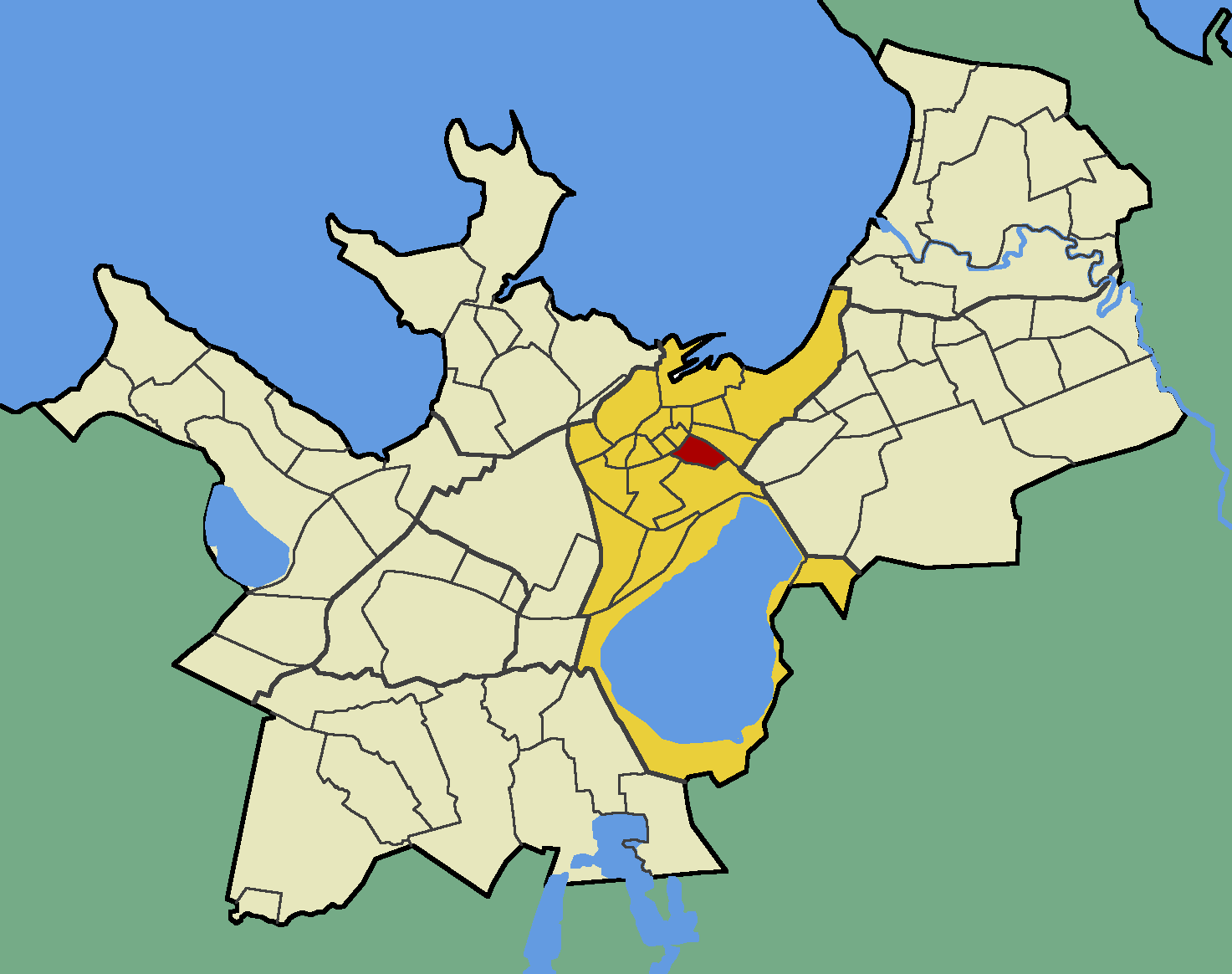
- Keldrimäe within the district of Kesklinn (Midtown).
- Country: Estonia
- County: Harju County
- City: Tallinn
- District: Kesklinn

Population (01.01.2014)
  - Total: 4,747

Keldrimäe (Estonian for "Cellar Hill") is a subdistrict (asum) in the district of Kesklinn (Midtown), Tallinn, the capital of Estonia. It has a population of 4,747 (As of 1 January 2014).

== Gallery ==
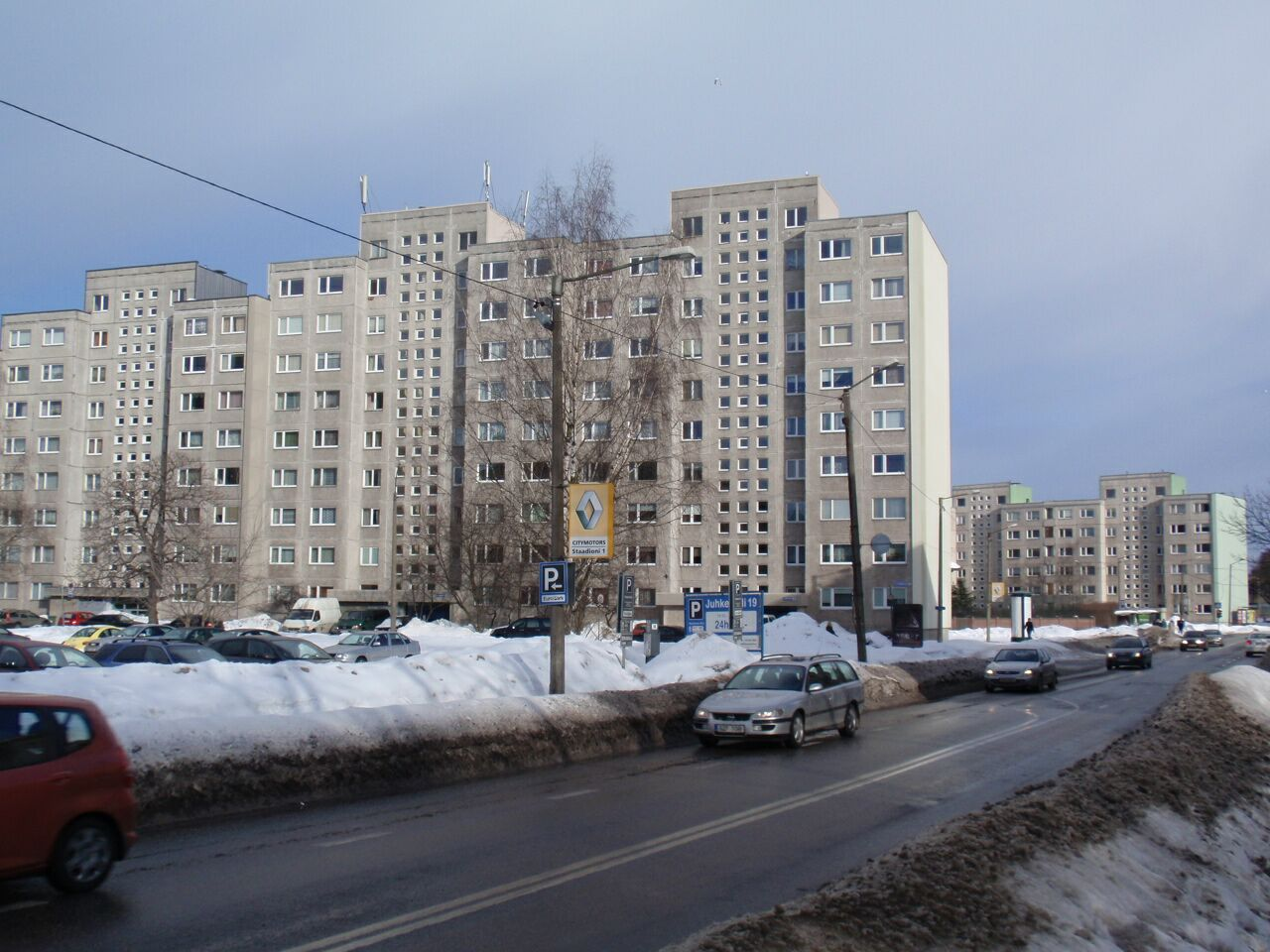

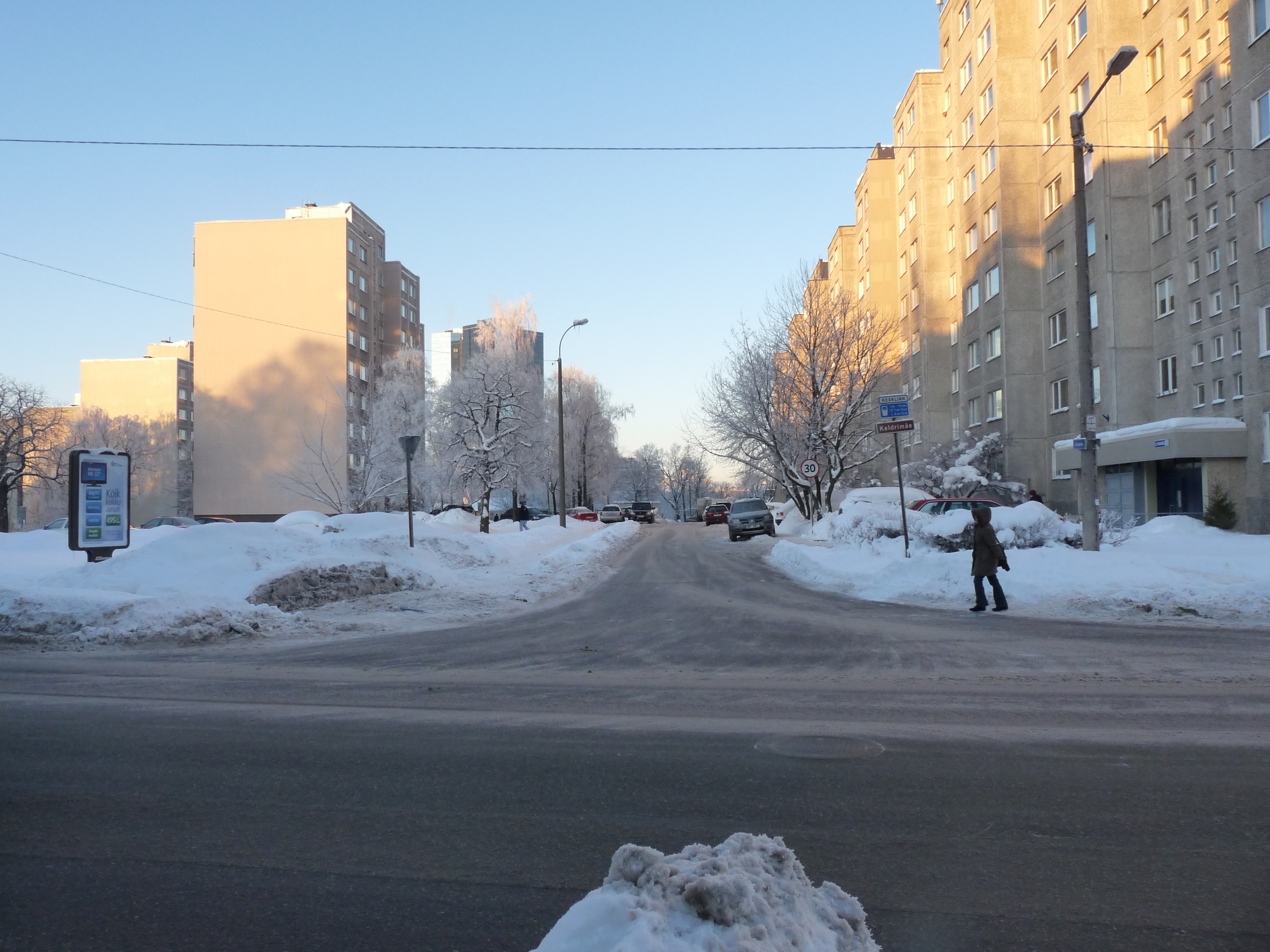

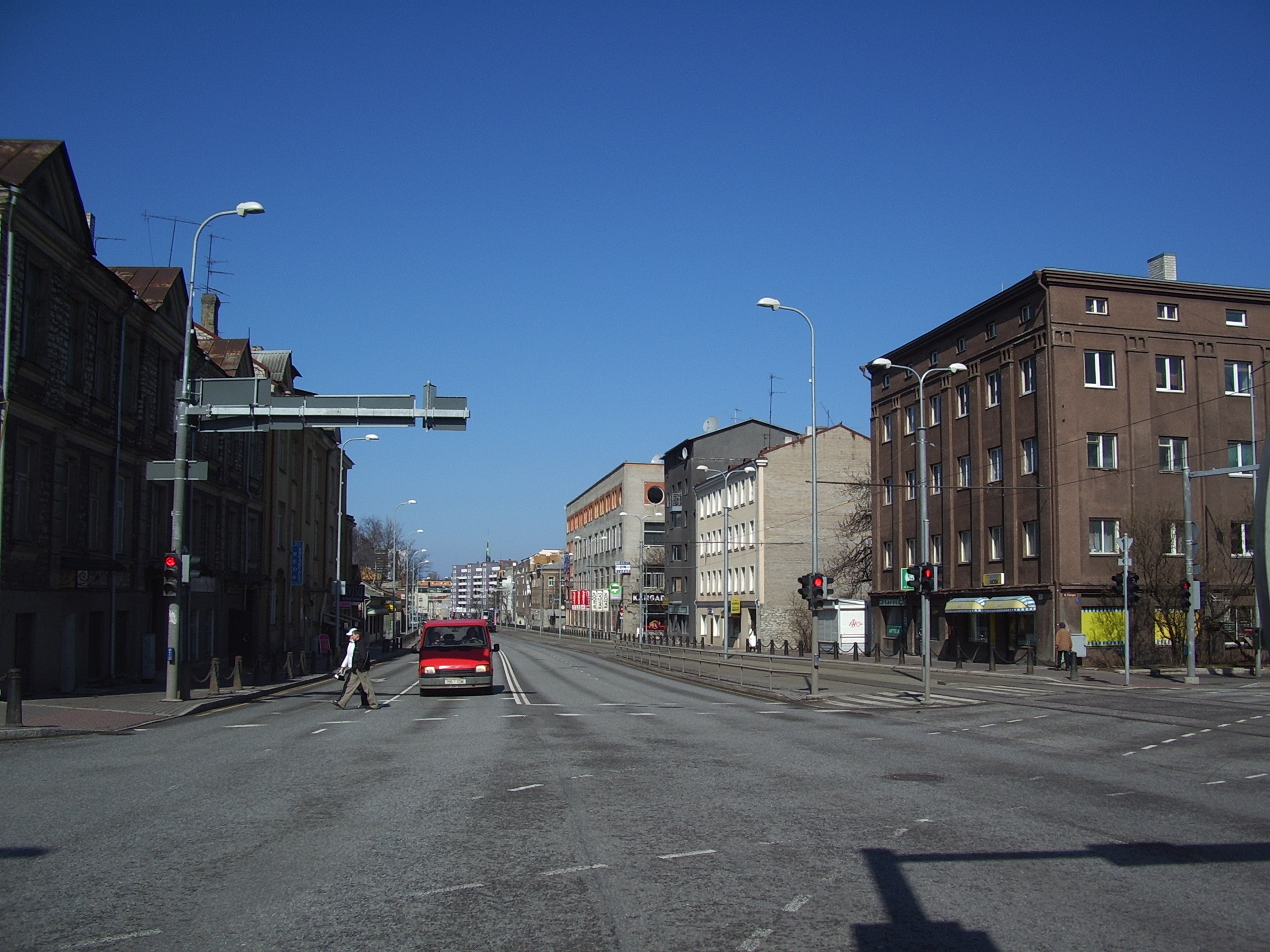

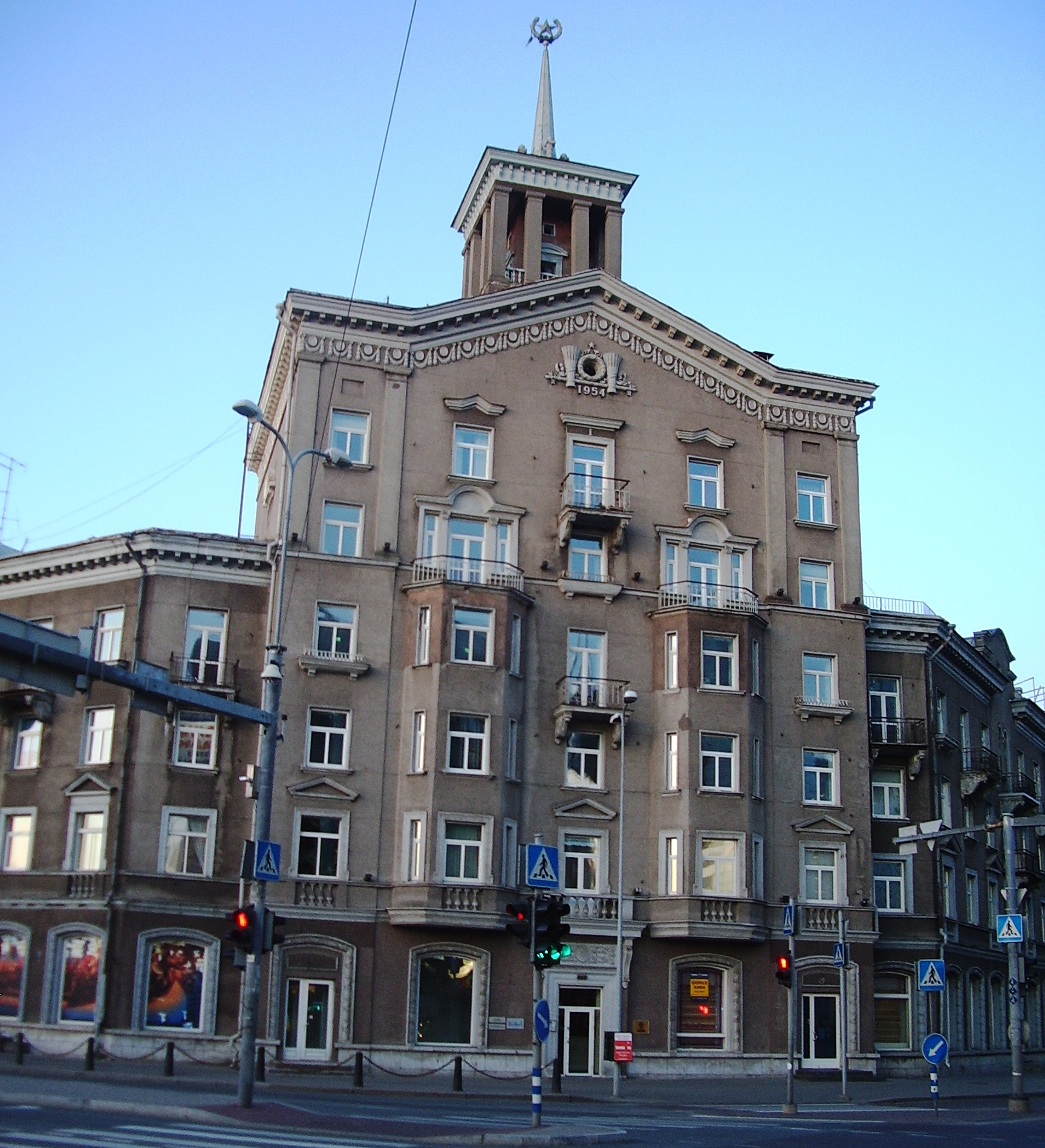
Stalinist apartment building on the corner of Tartu maantee and Liivalaia

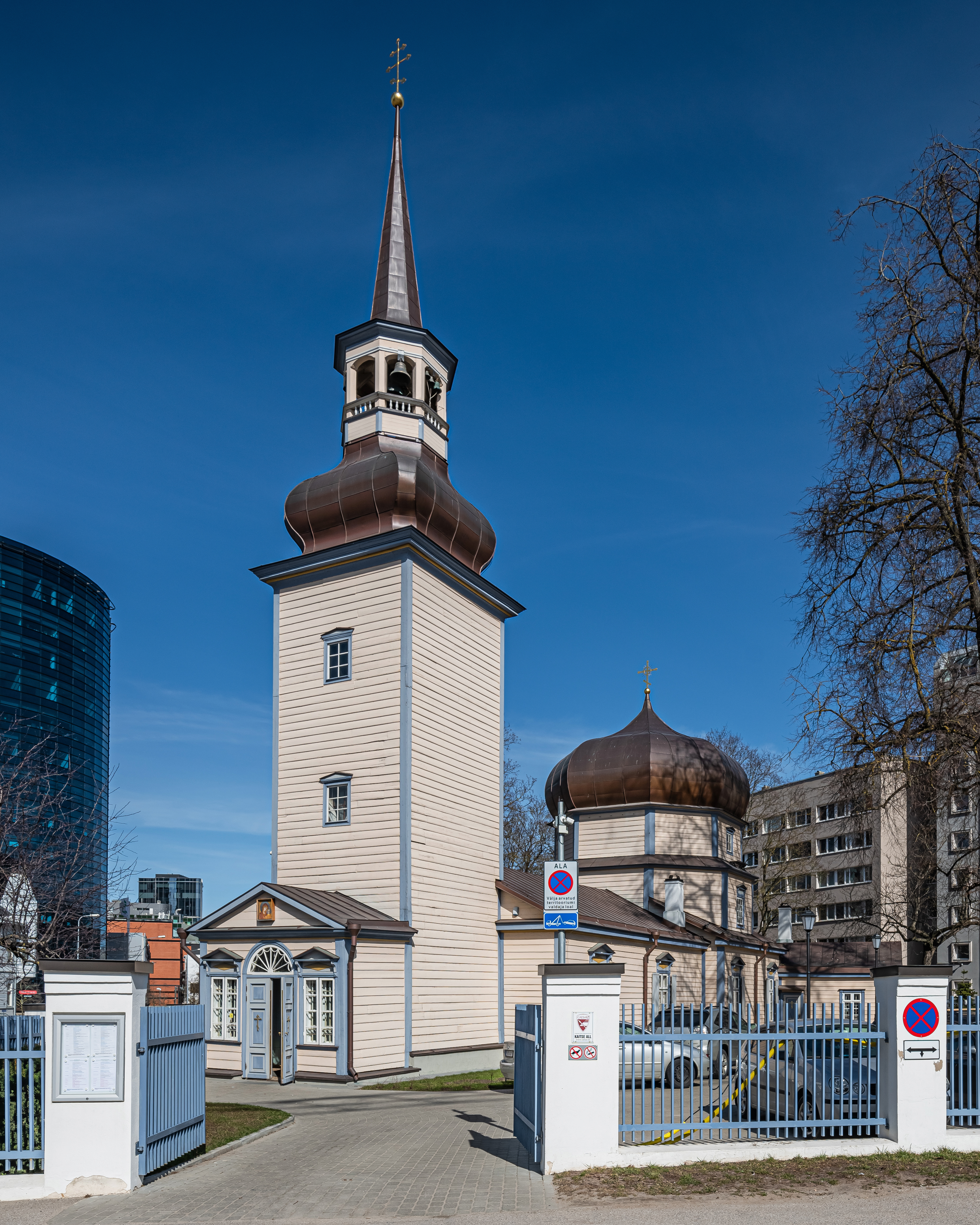
Church of Our Lady of Kazan on Liivalaia street
