= Raua =

Subdistrict of Tallinn, Estonia

Coordinates: 59°26′11.99″N 24°46′9.05″E

- Subdistrict of Tallinn
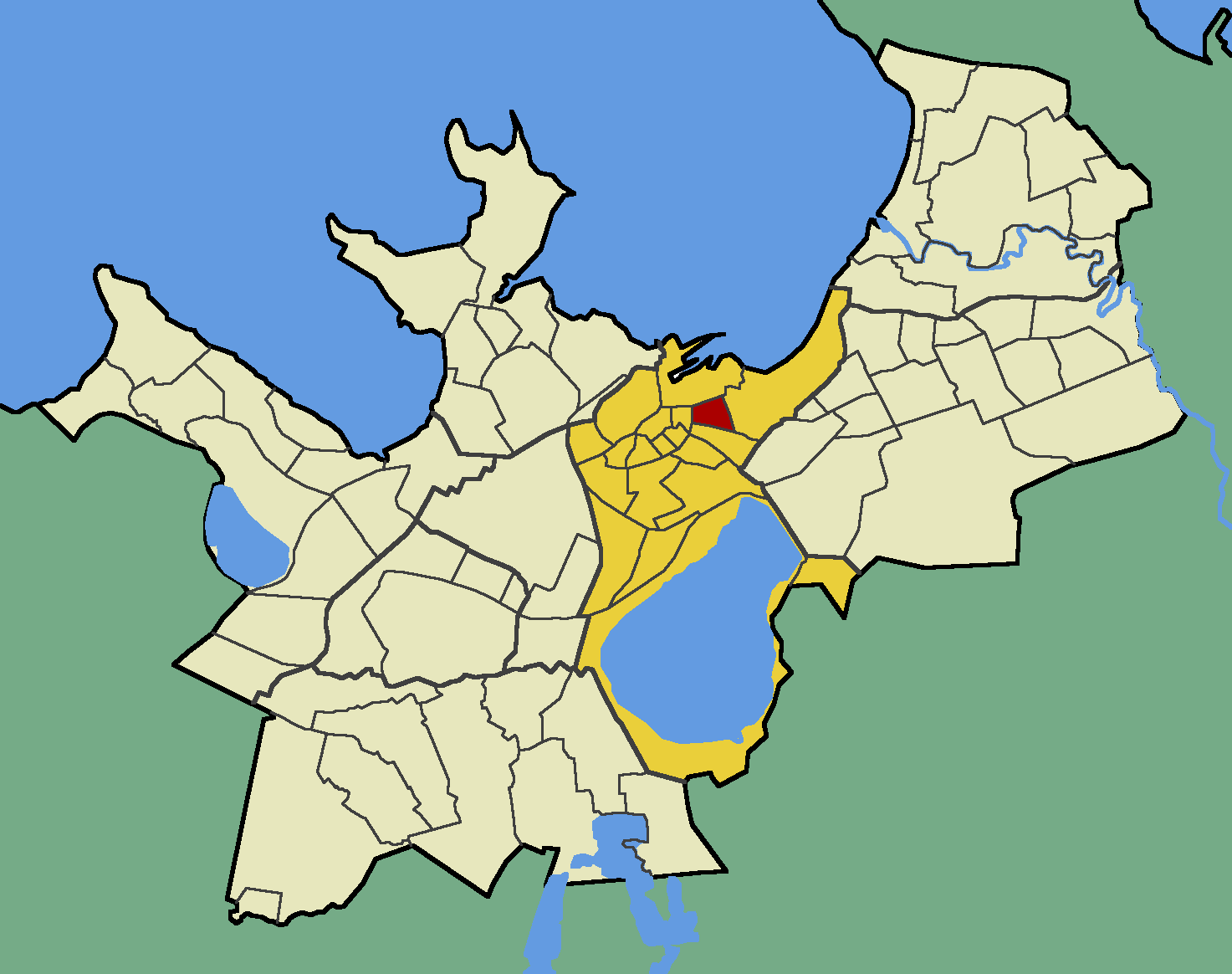
- Raua within the district of Kesklinn (Midtown).
- Country: Estonia
- County: Harju County
- City: Tallinn
- District: Kesklinn

Population (01.01.2014)
  - Total: 5,654

Raua (Estonian for "Iron") is a subdistrict (asum) in the district of Kesklinn (Midtown), Tallinn, the capital of Estonia. It had a population of 5,654 (As of 1 January 2014).

== Gallery ==
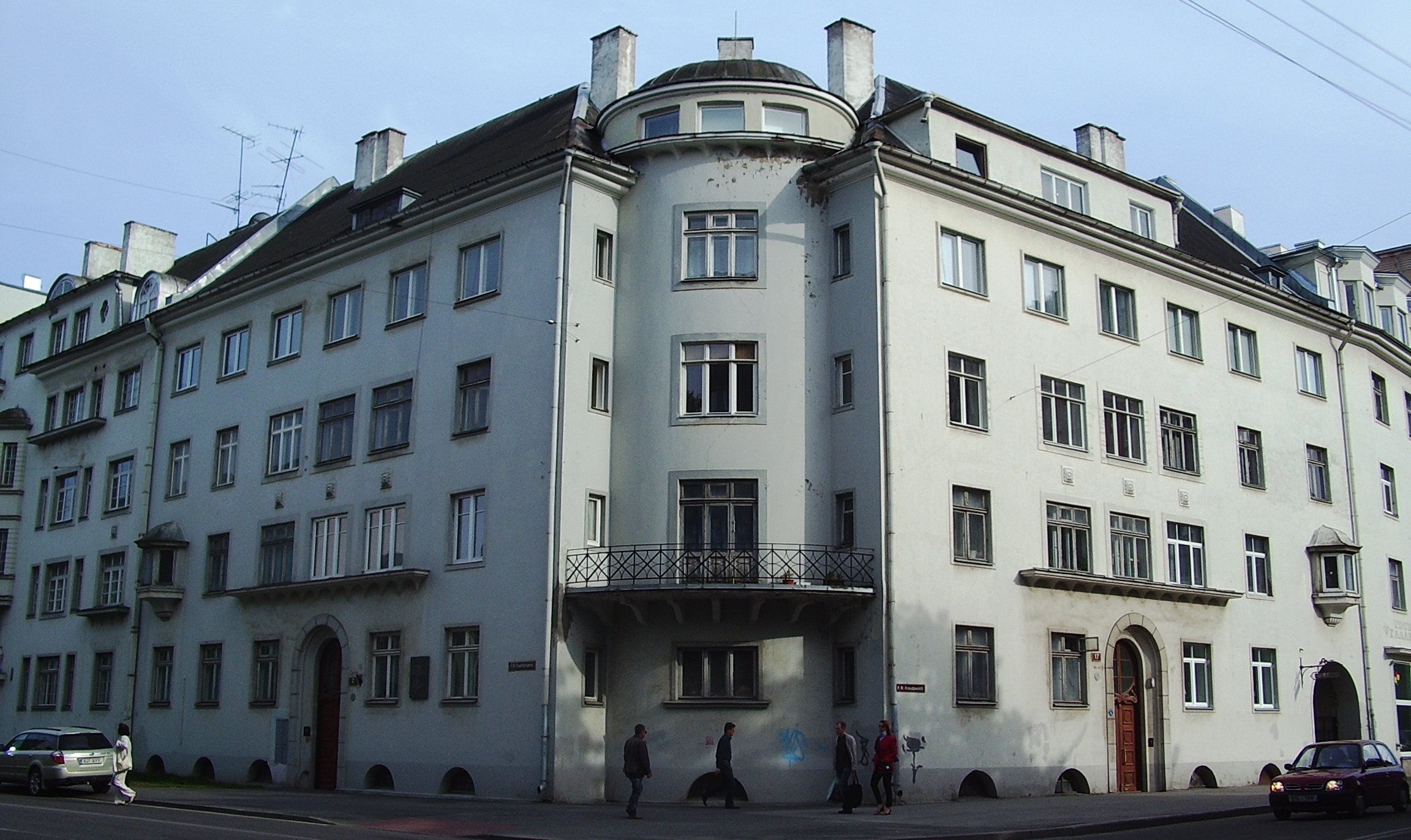

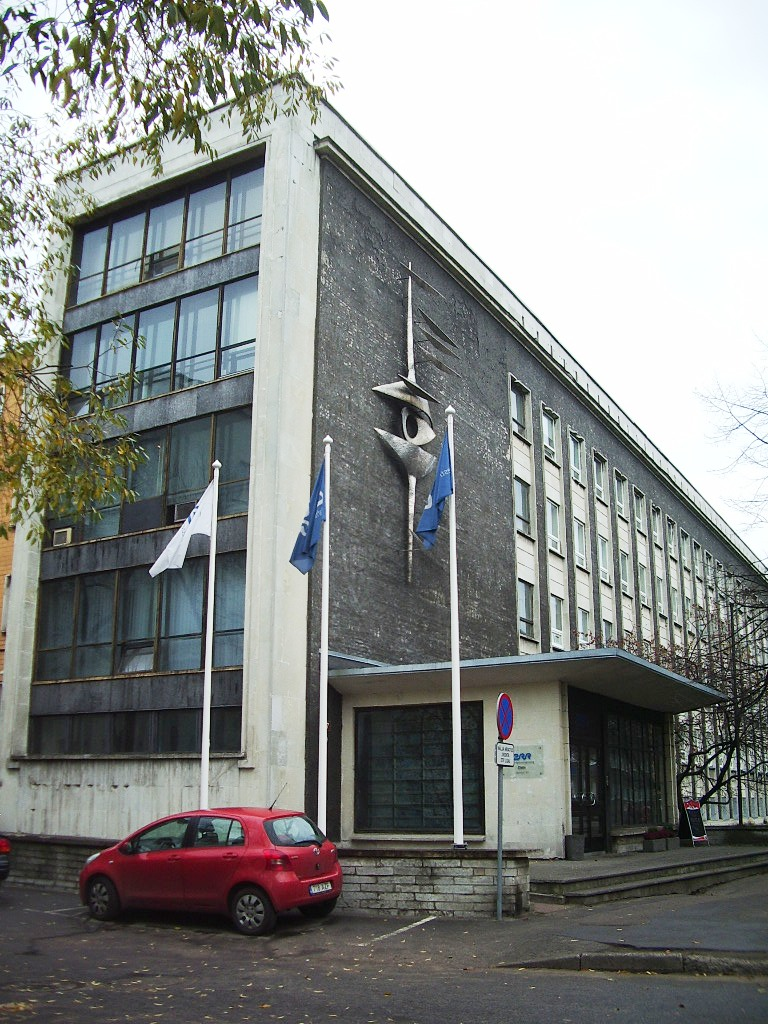
Building of Estonian Television (ETV)

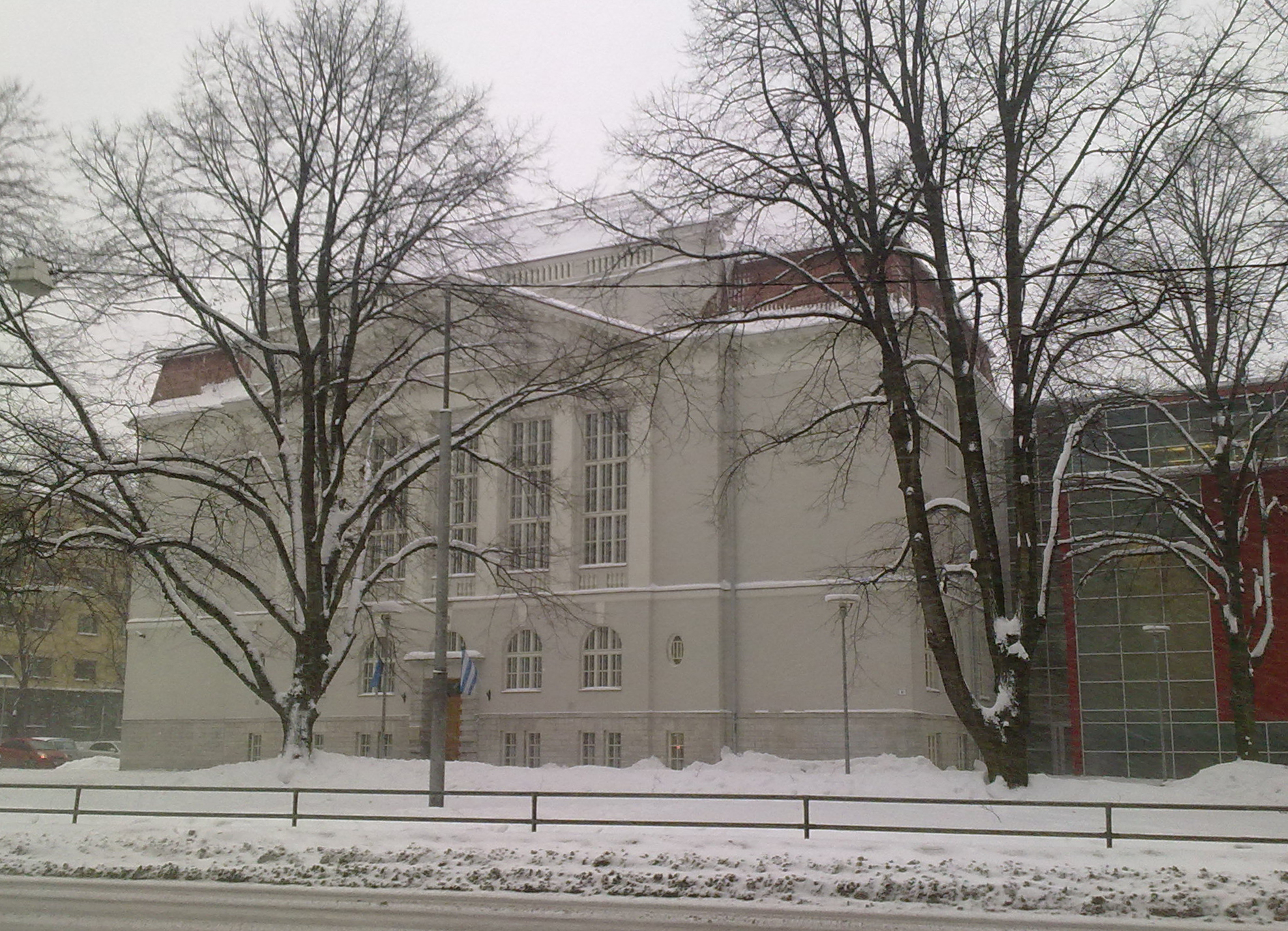
Tallinn 21. School
