= Artius =

Shopping mall in Tallinn, Estonia

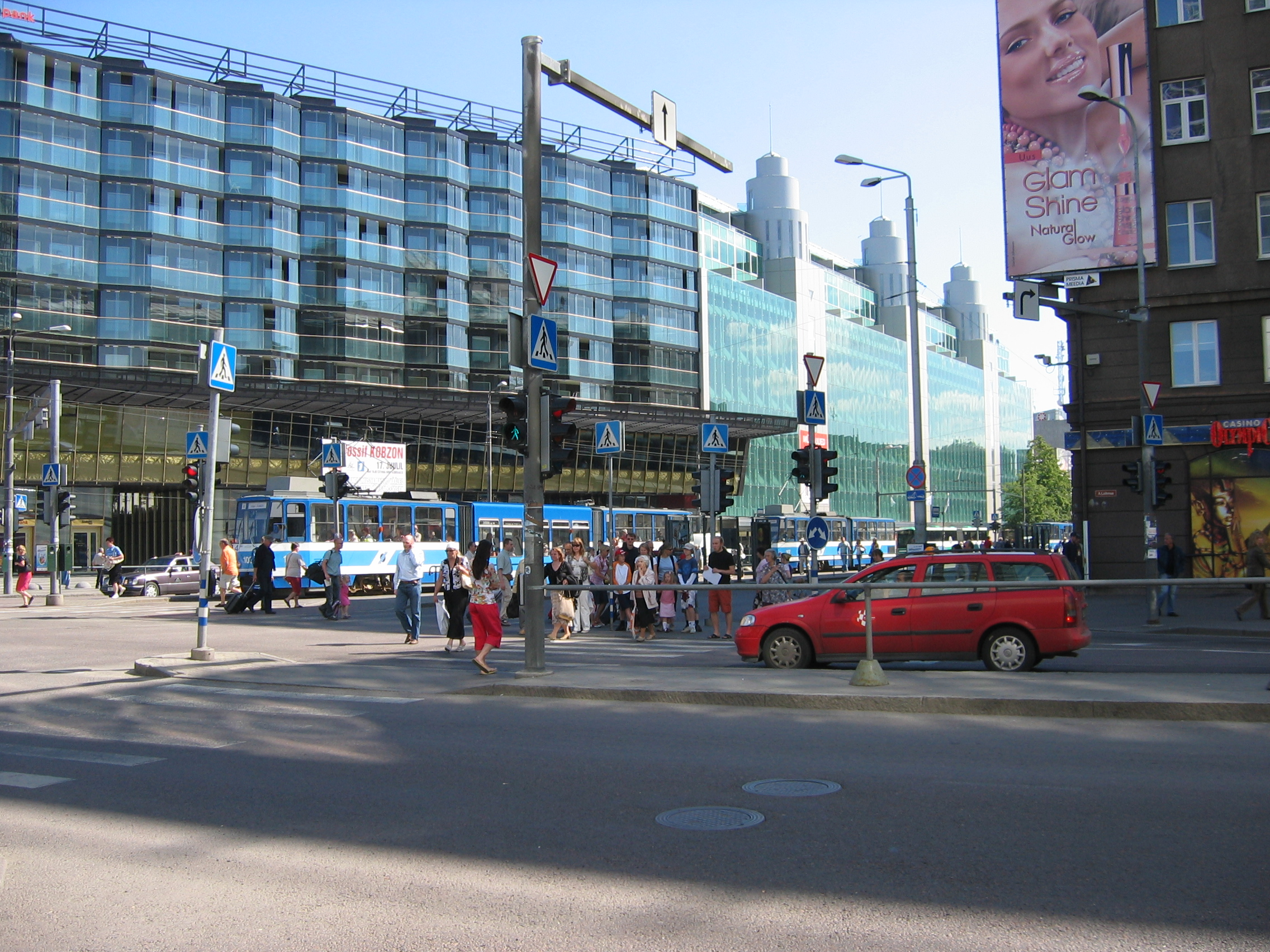
- Artius Centre in the top left-hand corner
- Location: Kesklinn, Tallinn, Estonia
- Coordinates: 59°26′15.72″N 24°45′30.47″E
- Address: Narva mnt 5
- Opened: 2007
- Owner: Foorum SPA OÜ
- Architect: Tomomi Hayashi, Hanno Grossschmidt
- Num. of stores: 28
- Floor area: 2,500 square metres (26,910 sq ft)
- Floors: 7
- Website: artius.ee

Artius (formerly Foorum) is a shopping centre in the centre of Tallinn, Estonia. Artius has a gross leasable area of 2,500 square metres containing 28 different shops (including four restaurants and cafés), including women's fashion, footwear, kid's clothes, jewelry, cosmetics and beauty products.

The centre has seven floors, with the shops and other commercial services on the ground and first floors. The other floors are mostly used as flats and offices.

The business hour of the shopping centre is 10AM-8PM from Monday to Saturday, on Sunday, it opens at 11AM and closes at 6PM.
