= Kesklinn, Tallinn =

District of Tallinn, Estonia

Kesklinn
- District of Tallinn
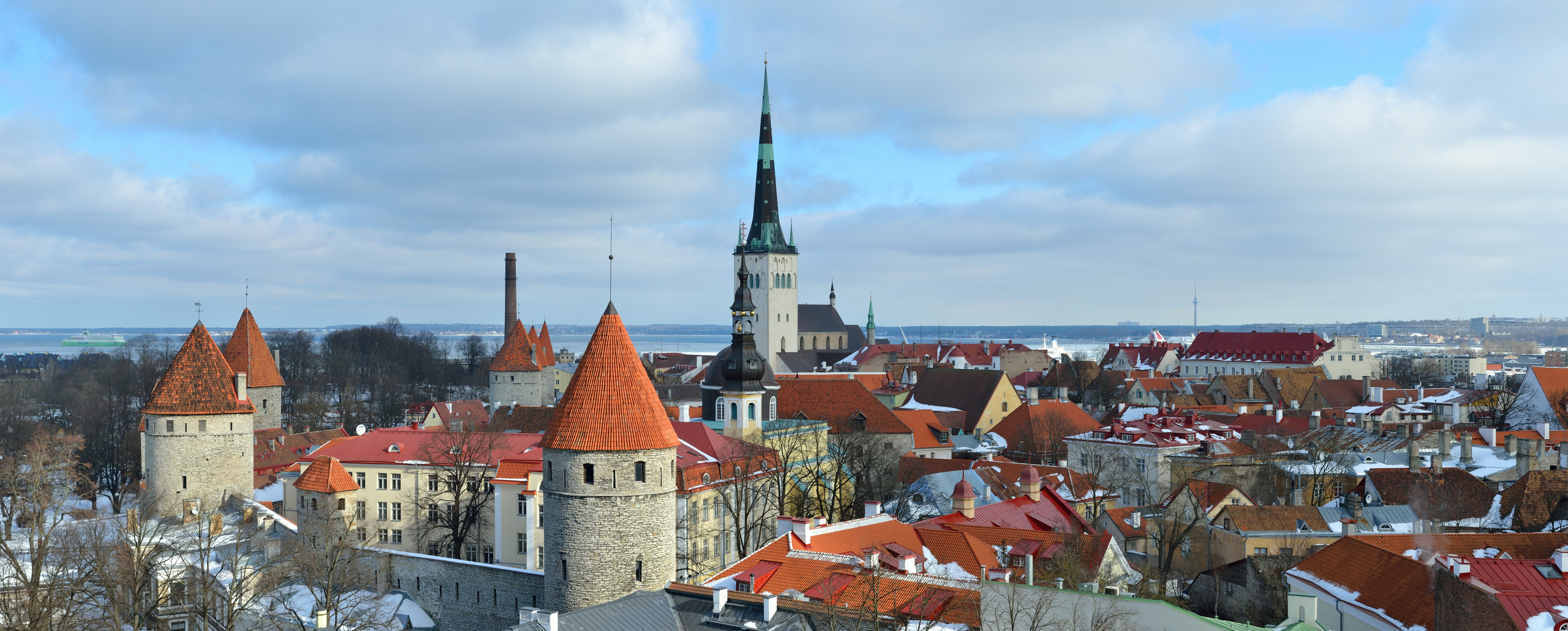
- Tallinn view from Toompea.

- Flag Coat of arms

- Location of Kesklinn in Tallinn.
- Coordinates: 59°26′12″N 24°45′08″E
- Country: Estonia
- County: Harju County
- City: Tallinn

Government
  - District Elder: Sander Andla (Reform Party)

Area
  - Total: 30.6 km^{2} (11.8 sq mi)

Population (01.11.2014)
  - Total: 57,731
  - Density: 1,890/km^{2} (4,890/sq mi)
- Website: tallinn.ee

Kesklinn (Estonian for 'city centre') is one of the 8 administrative districts (Estonian: linnaosa) of Tallinn, the capital of Estonia. It is situated on the Tallinn Bay and bordered to the northwest by the district of Põhja-Tallinn, to the west by Kristiine, to the southwest by Nõmme, to the east by Lasnamäe and Pirita, and to the south by Rae Parish, beyond Lake Ülemiste. The island of Aegna, located in the Tallinn Bay, also falls within this administrative district. Kesklinn has an area of 30.6 km^{2} (11.8 sq mi) and a population of 57,731 (As of 1 November 2014); population density is 1,886.6/km^{2} (4,886/sq mi).

It is home to Tallinn's UNESCO-listed Old Town. Here sits the Tallinn Passenger Port and port-related business centres, including a new complex of high-rise buildings on Liivalaia Street, as well as Tartu Road and Maakri Street. Most of the city's public and cultural venues are located in Kesklinn. These include the parliament building (Toompea Castle), City Government, The Estonian National Opera, Estonian and Russian drama theatres, The National Library, Kadrioru and Kalevi stadiums and a considerable number of museums, theatres and government agencies. Real estate costs in the area are the highest in Estonia. While the population of the city and the country as a whole have fallen since independence, the population of Kesklinn has risen. One of the economy's key drivers is tourism from Helsinki, Finland, which is connected to Tallinn by rapid ferry traffic.

Outside old town, there are a number of sights including Kadriorg Palace in Kadriorg, a Baroque building which was built in the 18th century by Peter I of Russia. Here also is the location of the Rotermanni quarter, Tatari, Kassisaba subdistricts. Until April 2007, a bronze Soviet war monument commemorated the occupation of Estonia by the Soviet Union; however this statue was relocated, sparking protests throughout the country's vocal Russian minority and abroad. This part of the city is home to 42 parks, including Kadriorg Park, Toompark, Hirvepark, and Tammsaare Park. The coastline gulf stretches from the Linnahall to a memorial of Maarjamäe.

Kesklinn has 21 subdistricts (Estonian: asum): Aegna, Juhkentali, Kadriorg, Kassisaba, Keldrimäe, Kitseküla, Kompassi, Luite, Maakri, Mõigu, Raua, Sadama, Sibulaküla, Südalinn, Tatari, Tõnismäe, Torupilli, Ülemistejärve, Uus Maailm, Vanalinn and Veerenni.

== Population ==
Kesklinn has a population of 57,731. According to official municipal records from the Tallinn City Government the district recorded a population of 57,731 as in 2014. There was a steady increase during the early twenty-first century, building from a low of 44,205 residents in 2004 to 55,750 by the close of 2014. By 2021, the district experienced renewed population growth, expanding to 64,551 residents. The findings for 2021 show Estonians at 65.1% and the Russian community stabilising at 17.0%.

Initial records indicate a sharp post-Soviet contraction, with the district's total population declining from a peak of 70,437 residents in 1989 down to 45,009 by 2000. The ethnic composition of Kesklinn changed following the dissolution of the Soviet Union. In 1989, ethnic Estonians made up 55.5% of the district's 70,437 residents, while ethnic Russians accounted for 35.0%. Historical census publications show that by 2000, the overall population contracted to 45,009, though the proportion of ethnic Estonians rose to 68.1% as the Russian minority population decreased to 24.1%. This trend continued into the next decade. The 2011 Estonia Census showed that ethnic Estonians reached a peak of 75.2% out of 46,494 residents, while the Russian community fell to 18.3%. In 2021, there was a diversification of other minority groups within Kesklinn. The Ukrainian population rose to 2.51%, Finns grew to 1.92%, and individuals categorized under other nationalities increased to 8.67% of the total population.

Subsequently, between 2004 and 2014, the population rose consistently from 44,205 to 55,750 residents, showing uninterrupted annual growth except for a minor fluctuation in 2007. More recent census data suggests this upward trajectory has persisted, with the population expanding to 64,551 in 2021, though remaining slightly below the late-Soviet peak.

Ethnic composition 1989-2021
Ethnicity	1989		2000		2011		2021	
Ethnicity	amount	%	amount	%	amount	%	amount	%
Estonians	39086	55.5	30658	68.1	34956	75.2	42053	65.1
Russians	24625	35.0	10867	24.1	8528	18.3	10942	17.0
Ukrainians	-	-	-	-	618	1.33	1623	2.51
Belarusians	-	-	-	-	292	0.63	469	0.73
Finns	-	-	-	-	395	0.85	1241	1.92
Jews	-	-	-	-	261	0.56	306	0.47
Latvians	-	-	-	-	85	0.18	297	0.46
Germans	-	-	-	-	82	0.18	454	0.70
Tatars	-	-	-	-	54	0.12	93	0.14
Poles	-	-	-	-	58	0.12	161	0.25
Lithuanians	-	-	-	-	81	0.17	159	0.25
unknown	5	0.01	681	1.51	140	0.30	1157	1.79
other	6721	9.54	2803	6.23	944	2.03	5596	8.67
Total	70437	100	45009	100	46494	100	64551	100

== Headquarters located in Kesklinn ==
Tallinn's central business district
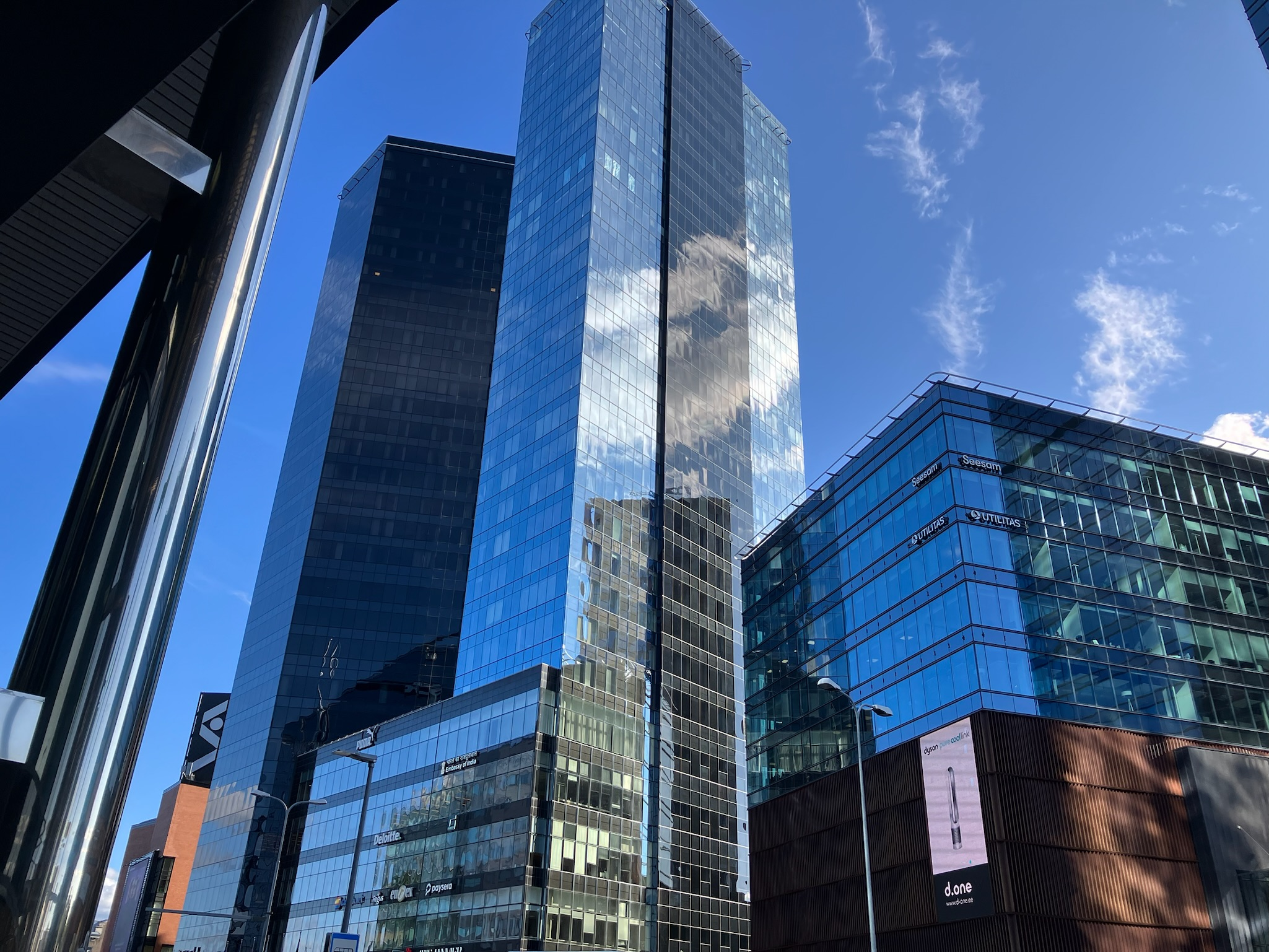
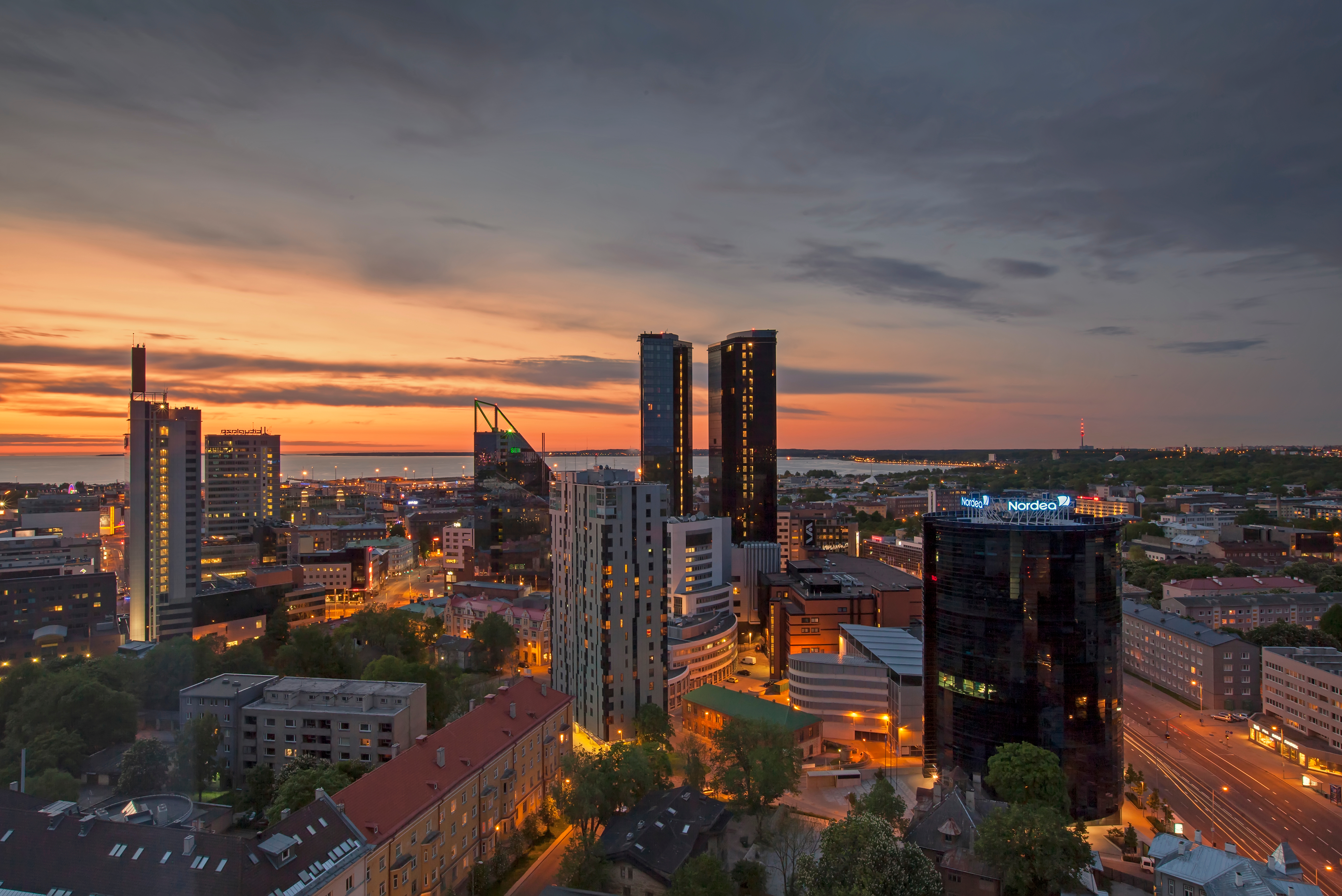

This list/table lists headquarters located in Kesklinn, Tallinn, Estonia.

Name	Type	Location within Kesklinn
Admiral Markets	Finance	Maakri
Alexela	Oil	Sadama
Apranga Group	Retail	Sadama
Bank of Estonia	Central bank	Südalinn
Bigbank	Bank	Maakri
Bolt	Transportation	Veerenni
Eesti Rahvusringhääling	Radio and television	Raua
Espak	Retail	Veerenni
EuroPark Estonia	Parking	Südalinn
Forum Cinemas Estonia	Entertainment	Sadama
LHV	Bank	Kompassi
Liviko	Food and beverages	Juhkentali
Luminor	Bank	Maakri
Lux Express	Transportation	Juhkentali
Ministry of Foreign Affairs	Government	Sibulaküla
Nasdaq Tallinn	Finance	Maakri
Olerex	Oil	Torupilli
Olympic Entertainment Group	Entertainment	Torupilli
Postimees Group	Media	Maakri
SEB Pank	Bank	Maakri
Swedbank Eesti	Bank	Veerenni
Tallink	Shipping	Sadama
Tallinna Kaubamaja Grupp	Retail	Südalinn
Toyota Baltic	Automotive	Ülemistejärve
