= List of shopping malls in Estonia =

Estonia has 37 shopping malls with more than 5,000 m^{2} (54,000 sq ft) square meters of gross leasable area. Nearly half of them lie in Tallinn, however the largest one in the country is Lõunakeskus in Tartu. The rest are spread across 9 towns in all corners of the country.

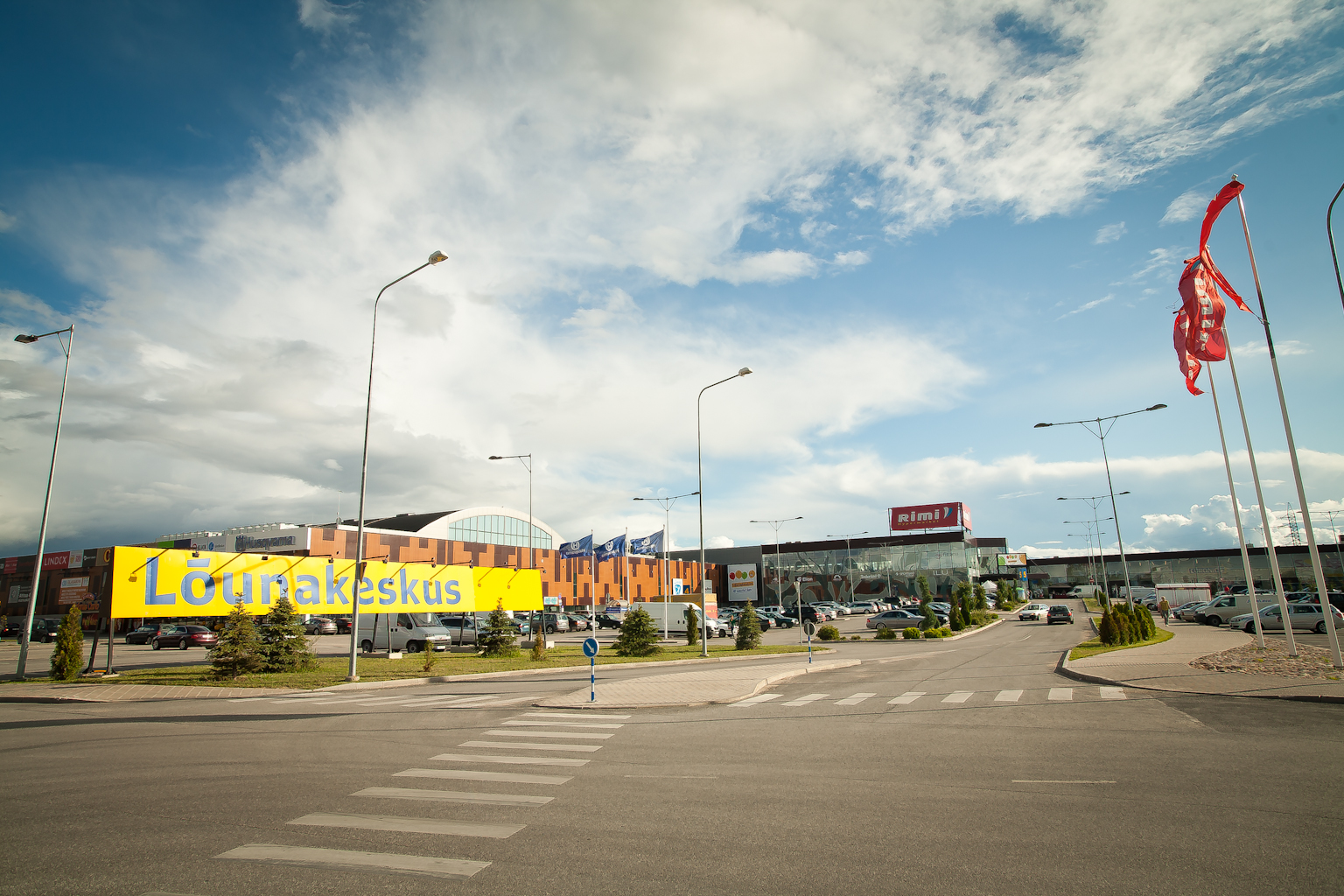
Lõunakeskus

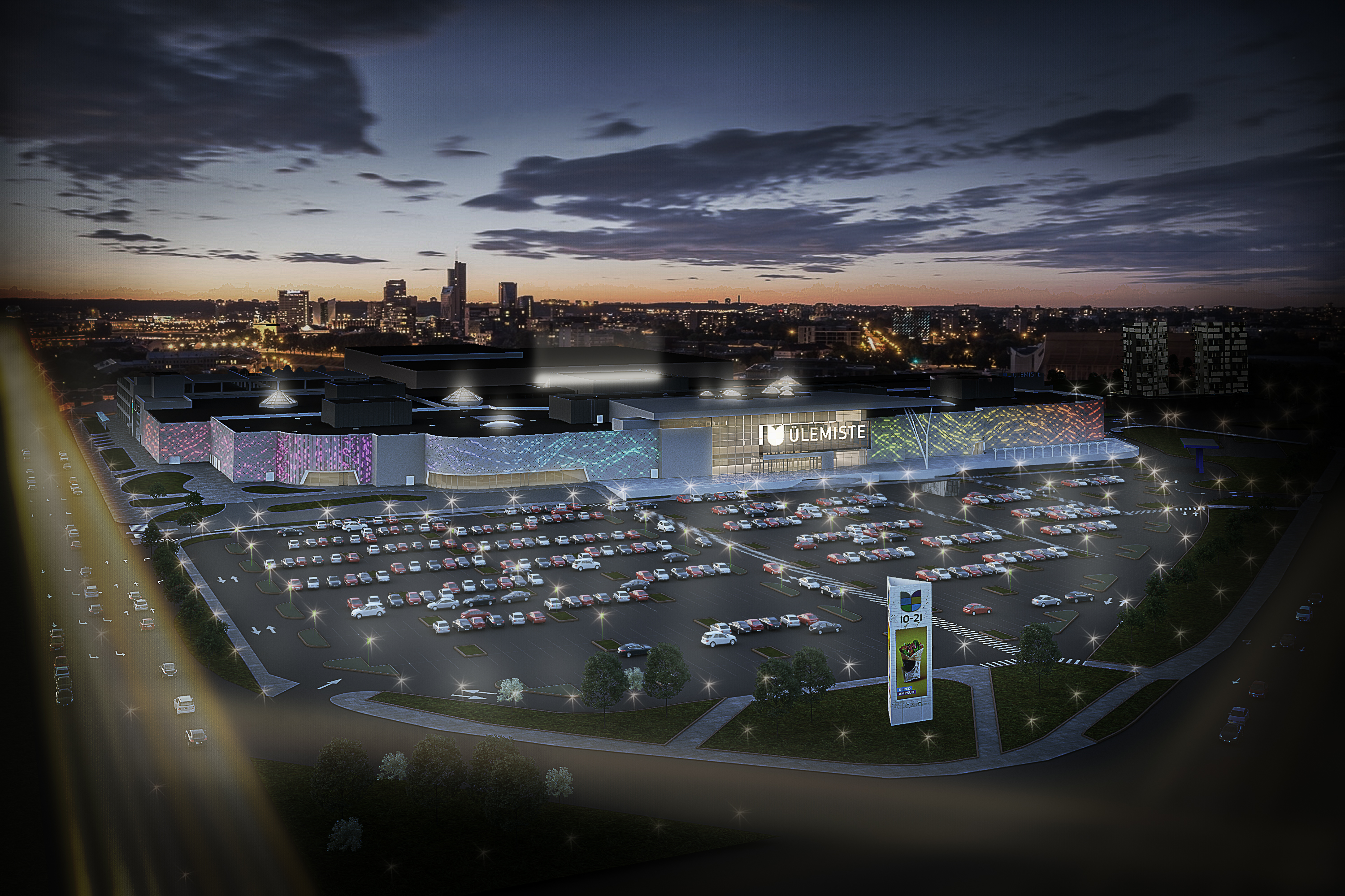
Ülemiste

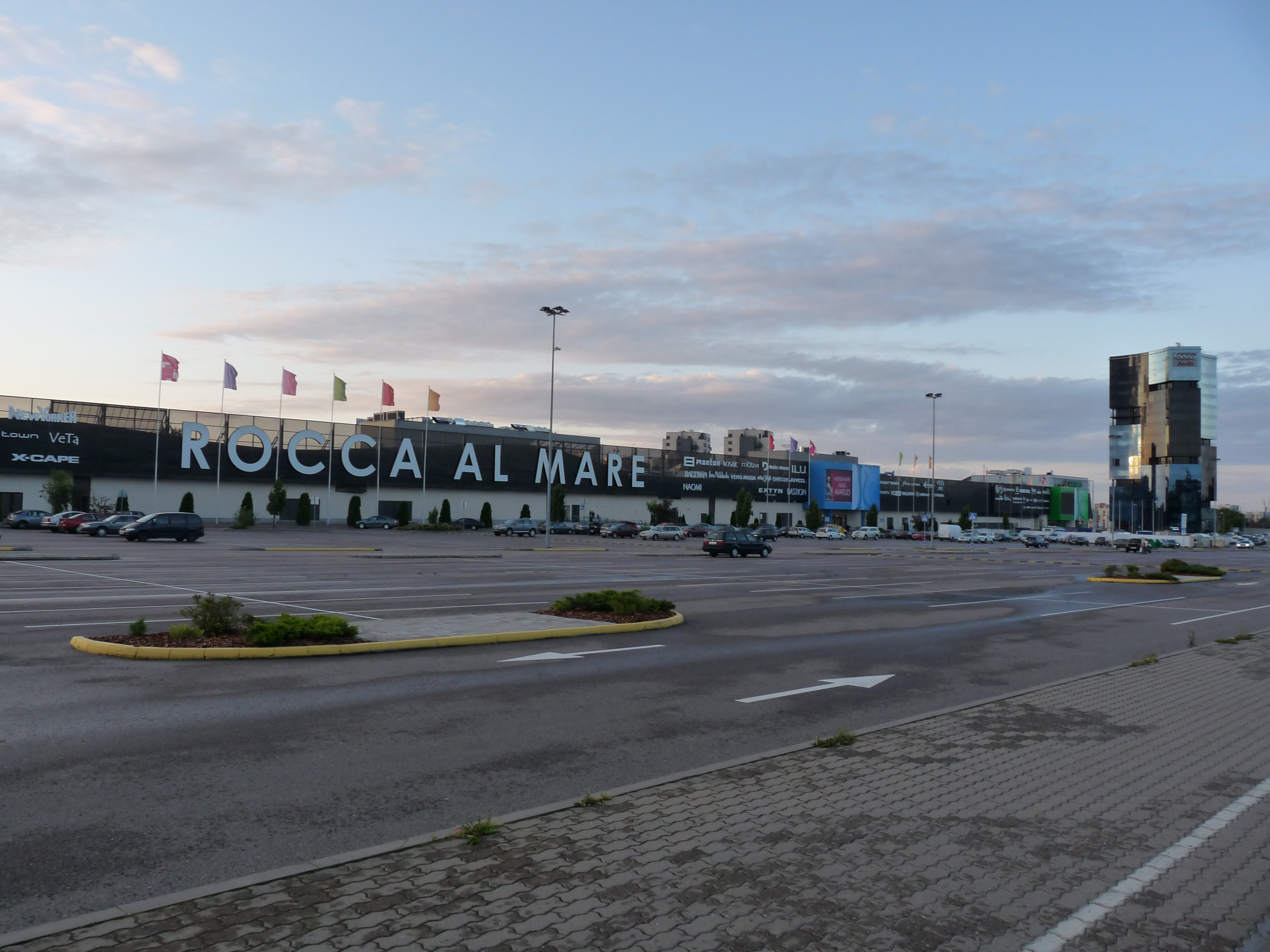
Rocca al Mare

T1 Mall of Tallinn (left)

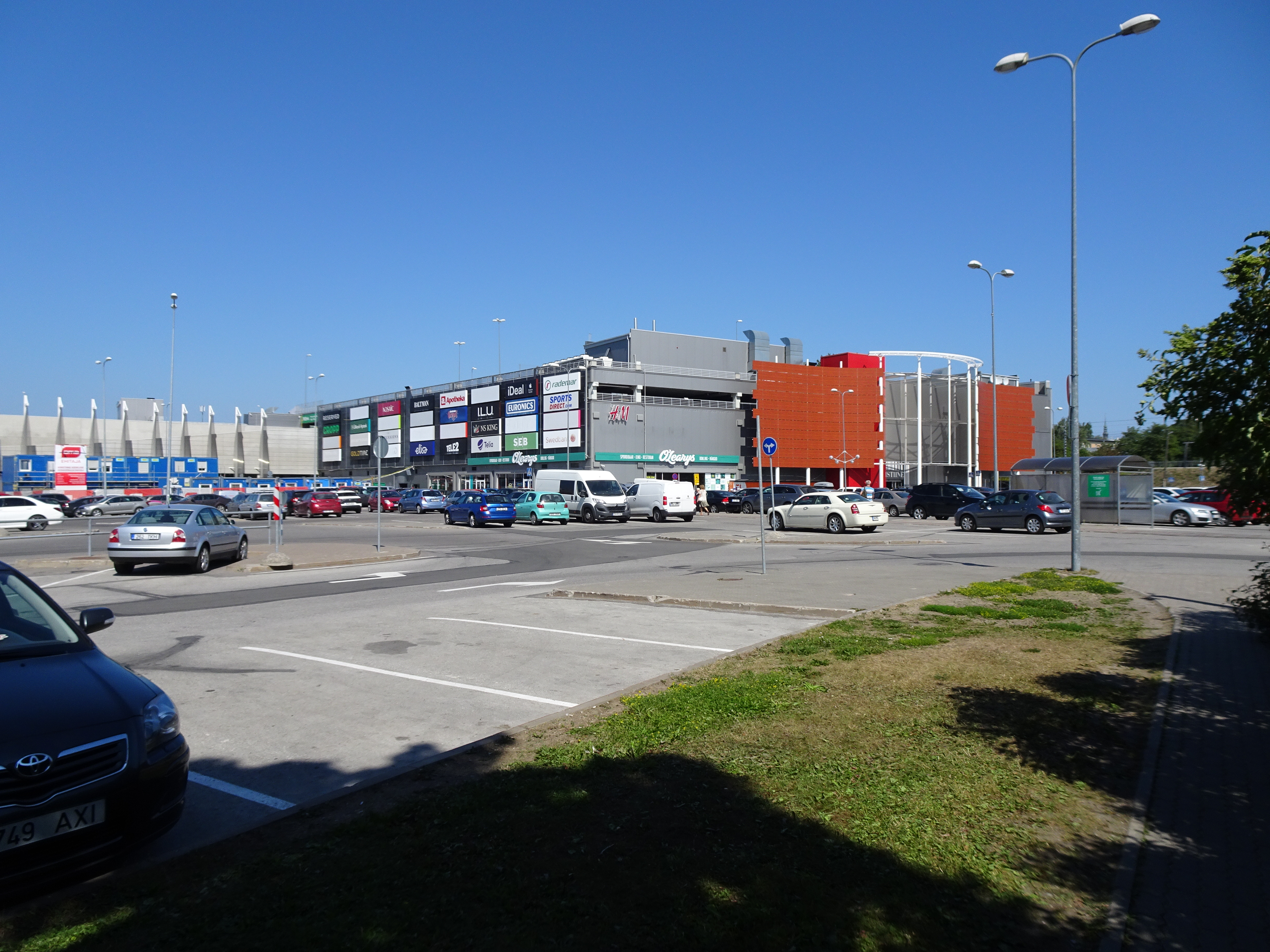
Kristiine Keskus

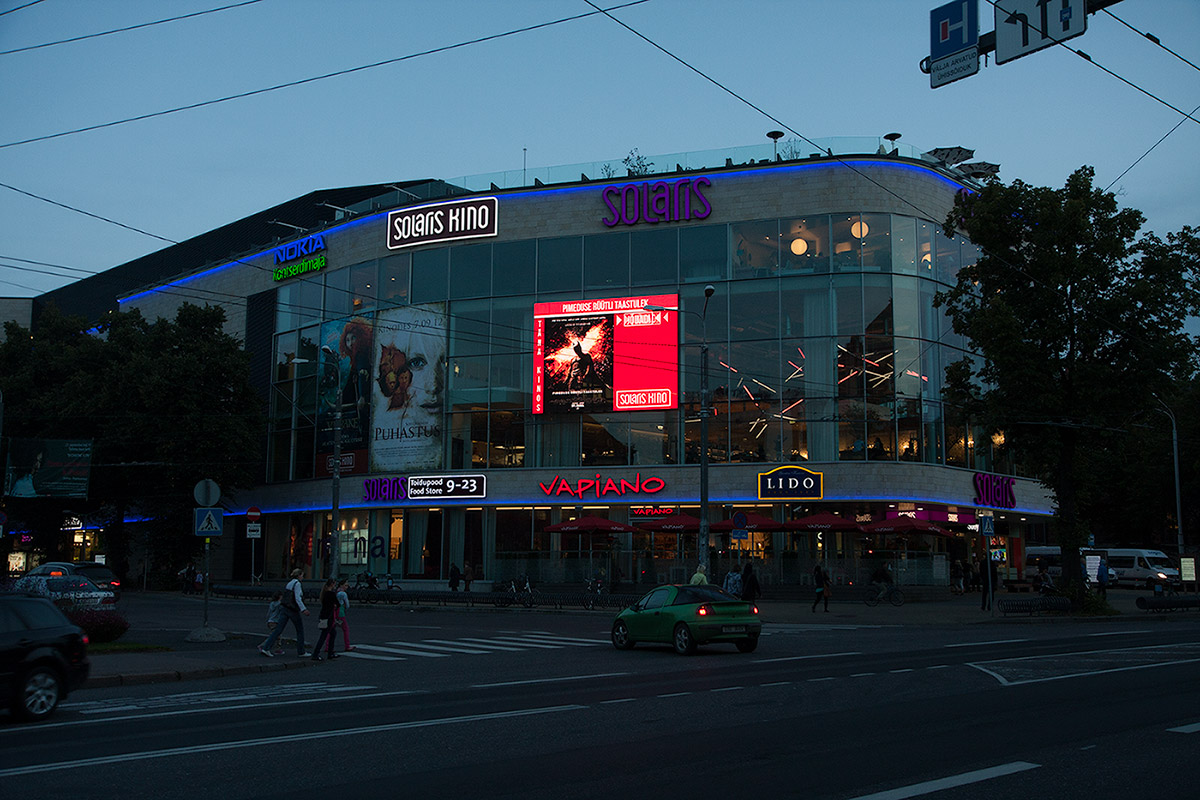
Solaris

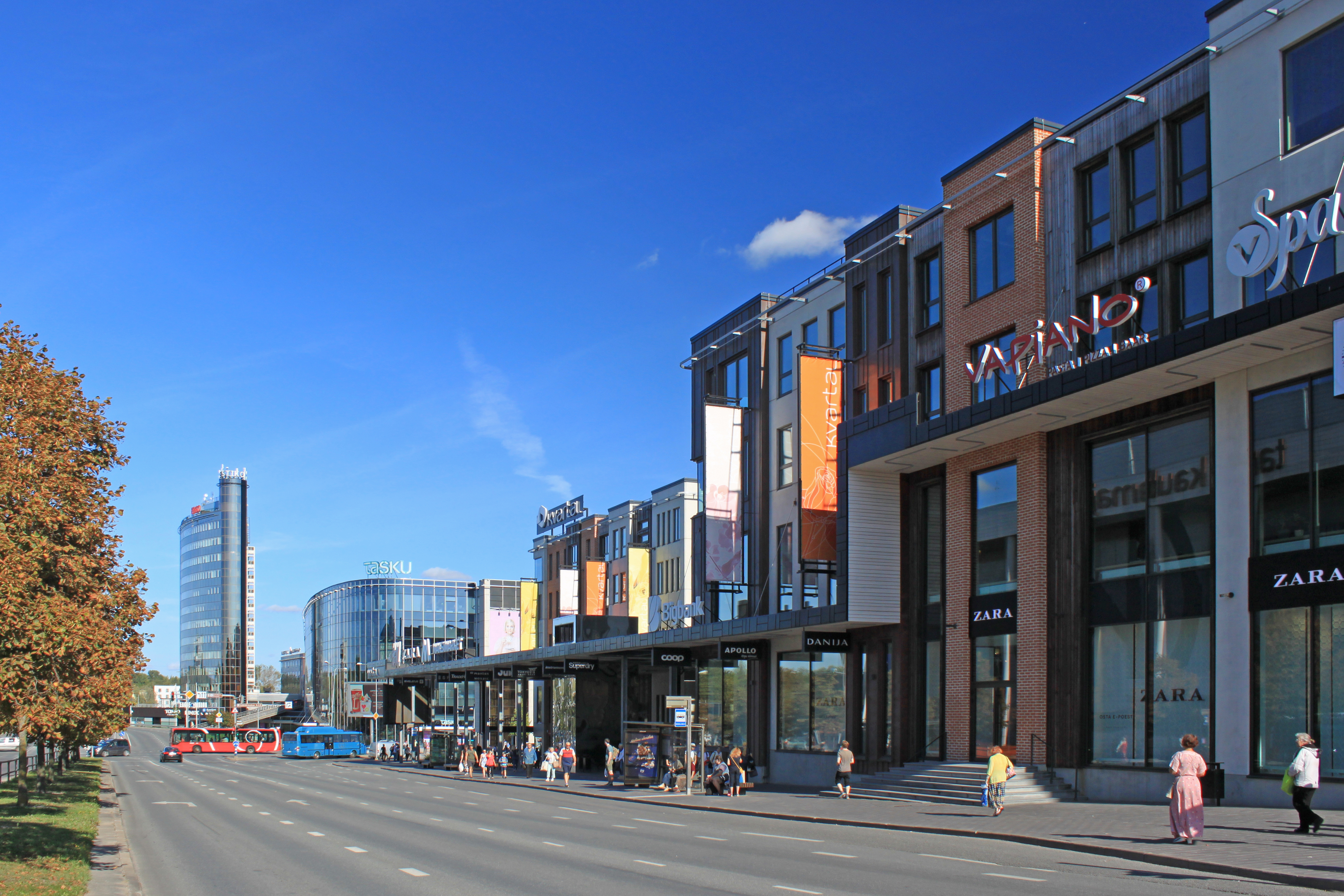
Kvartal

Tasku

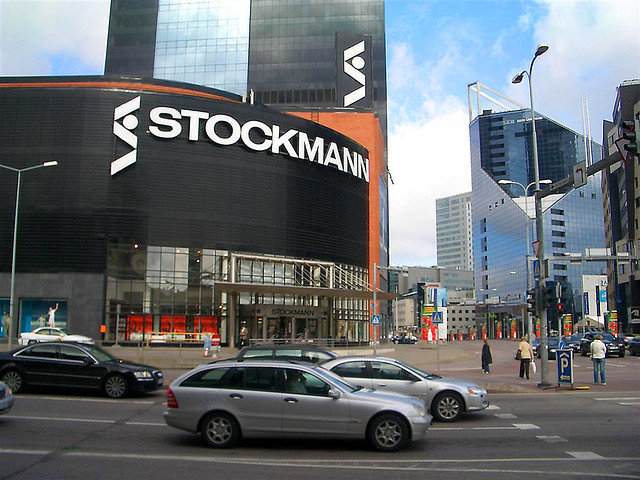
Stockmann

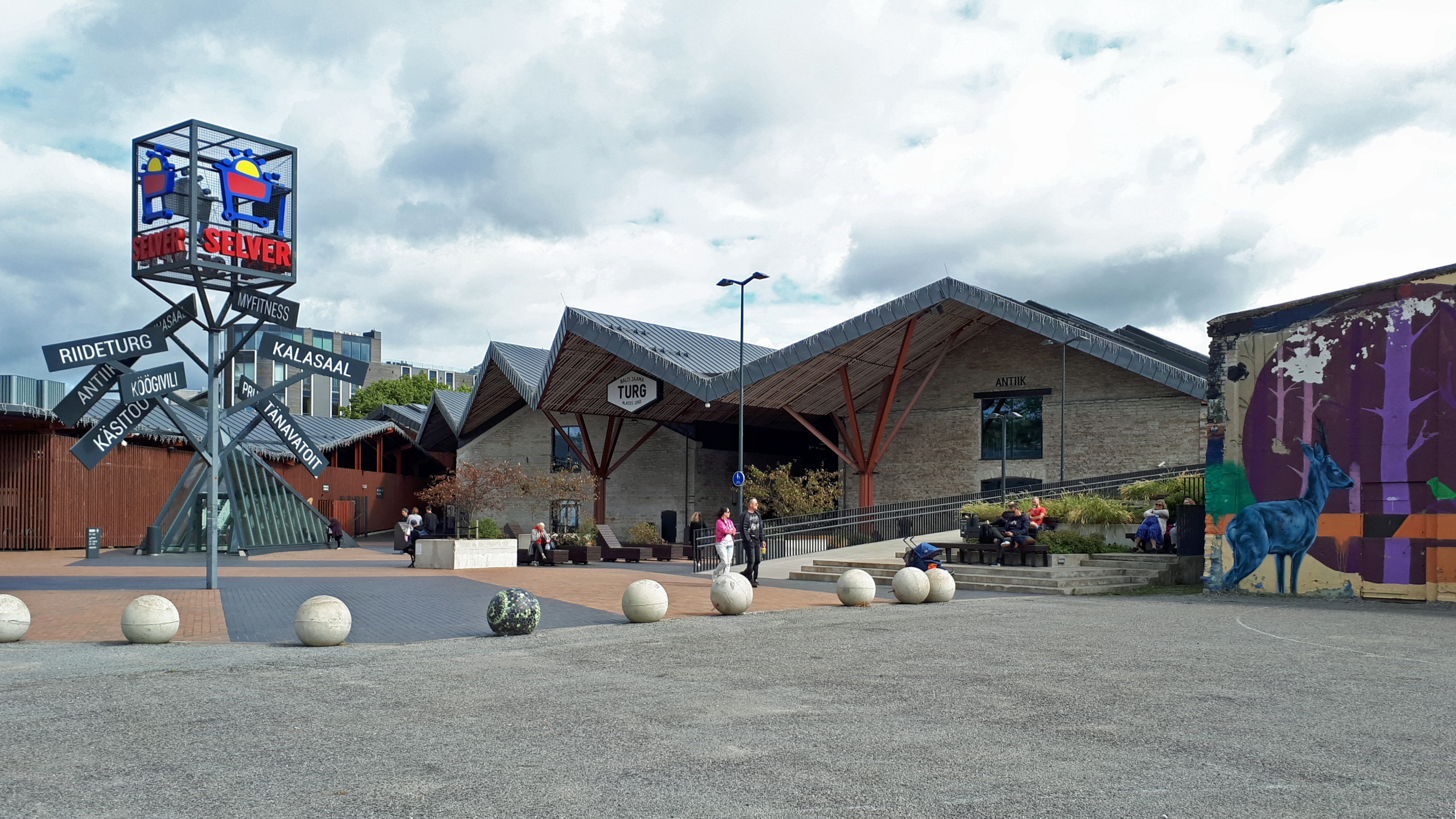
Balti Jaama Turg

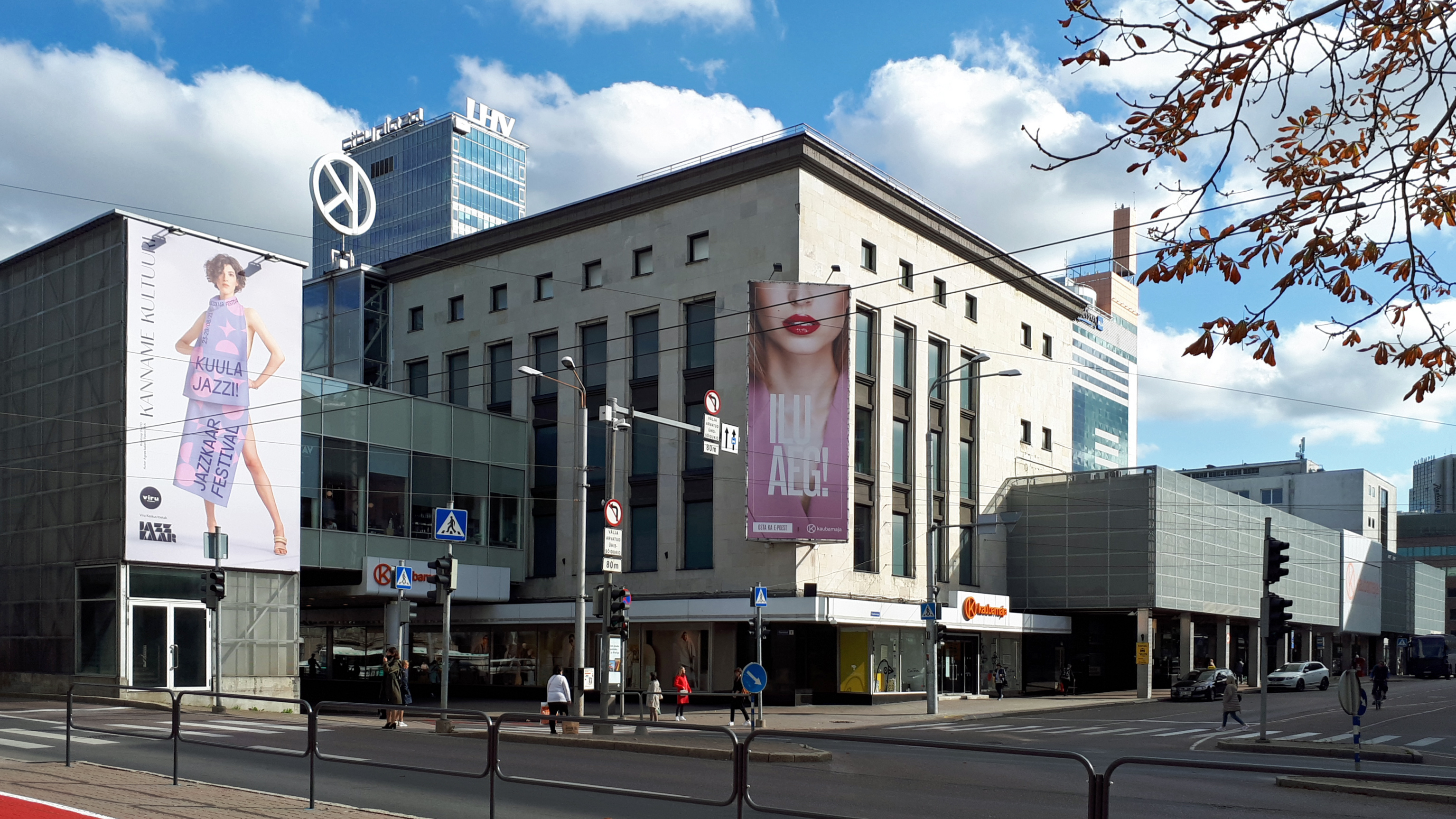
Tallinna Kaubamaja

New shopping malls are unlikely to come by in the future, as there have long been debates about the oversaturation and overabundance of shopping malls. This was only worsened by the onset of the COVID-19 pandemic and its economic implications, as was shown by T1, which went bankrupt only three years after opening. Further expansions, as shown by the plans of Ülemiste, are more multifunctional and intend to widen the scope of the centre's purpose.

== List ==
The list was last updated in 10/2022.

| | Mall | Location | Opened in | GLA | Remarks | References |
|---|---|---|---|---|---|---|
| 1 | Lõunakeskus | Tartu | 2001 | 90,000 m^{2} (970,000 sq ft) | Largest shopping mall in Estonia by GLA. Undertaken six expansions and renovations since construction, latest in 2017. | |
| 2 | Ülemiste keskus | Tallinn (Ülemiste) | 2004 | 70,000 m^{2} (750,000 sq ft) | Largest shopping mall in Estonia by overall area. (125 000 m2) Has undertaken several expansions since opening. Plans to expand centre further by 2027 with multifunctional building (office spaces, catering, entertainment). | |
| 3 | Rocca al Mare | Tallinn (Haabersti) | 1998 | 57,000 m^{2} (610,000 sq ft) | Plans to expand shopping centre and rebuild surrounding area with green spaces and mixed-use midrises. Name from nearby subdistrict. | |
| 4 | T1 Mall of Tallinn | Tallinn (Ülemiste) | 2018 | 57,000 m^{2} (610,000 sq ft) | Features city's first ferris wheel on roof. Marred by financial difficulties since opening. | |
| 5 | Kristiine Keskus | Tallinn (Lilleküla) | 1999 | 44,000 m^{2} (470,000 sq ft) | Three expansions/renovations since opening. | |
| 6 | Järve Keskus | Tallinn (Rahumäe) | 2002 | 44,000 m^{2} (470,000 sq ft) | Many home decor stores. | |
| 7 | Kvartal | Tartu | 2016 | 44,000 m^{2} (470,000 sq ft)* | | |
| 8 | Solaris | Tallinn (Südalinn) | 2009 | 43,000 m^{2} (460,000 sq ft) | | |
| 9 | Astri Keskus | Narva | 1970s | 40,000 m^{2} (430,000 sq ft) | Reconstructed several times, most lately in 2014. | |
| 10 | Tasku | Tartu | 2008 | 35,500 m^{2} (382,000 sq ft) | | |
| 11 | Fama Keskus | Narva | 2006 | 30,000 m^{2} (320,000 sq ft) | | |
| 12 | Mustikas | Tallinn (Kadaka) | 1998 | 27,500 m^{2} (296,000 sq ft) | | |
| 13 | Põhjakeskus | Rakvere | 2008 | 27,500 m^{2} (296,000 sq ft) | | |
| 14 | Viru Keskus | Tallinn (Südalinn) | 2004 | 27,000 m^{2} (290,000 sq ft) | Undergoing large-scale renovation/reconstruction as of 2022. Connected to Kaubamaja by glass gallery. | |
| 15 | Eedeni keskus | Tartu | 2003 | 26,000 m^{2} (280,000 sq ft) | Underwent expansion in 2017–2019. | |
| 16 | Kaubamajakas | Pärnu | 2004 | 25,000 m^{2} (270,000 sq ft) | Expansions in 2007 and 2014. | |
| 17 | Stockmann Tallinn | Tallinn (Maakri) | 1996 | 23,000 m^{2} (250,000 sq ft) | Original store opened in 1993 in Viru hotel. Current building built in 1996 and expanded in 2000, after which it was the largest shopping mall in the Baltic states. | |
| 18 | Lasnamäe Centrum | Tallinn (Tondiraba) | 2003 | 20,000 m^{2} (220,000 sq ft) | | |
| 19 | Balti Jaama Turg | Tallinn (Kalamaja) | 2017 | 19,000 m^{2} (200,000 sq ft) | Many individual produce sellers alongside street food vendors and antique stores. More of a traditional marketplace than shopping mall. Original market opened in 1993, current building opened in 2017. | |
| 20 | Nautica | Tallinn (Sadama) | 2002 | 18,500 m^{2} (199,000 sq ft) | Formerly known as Norde Centrum. Underwent massive reconstruction and expansion in 2017 and reopened as Nautica. Large focus on Finnish tourists as it is situated right next to the port. | |
| 21 | Tallinna Kaubamaja | Tallinn (Südalinn) | 1960 | 18,000 m^{2} (190,000 sq ft) | First shopping mall in Estonia. Plans underway to construct entirely new building. Connected with Viru Keskus via glass gallery. | |
| 22 | Kroonikeskus | Rakvere | 2002 | 18,000 m^{2} (190,000 sq ft) | Has undergone multiple expansions in 2005, 2008, 2012. | |
| 23 | Sikupilli kaubanduskeskus | Tallinn (Sikupilli) | 2000 | 17,500 m^{2} (188,000 sq ft) | | |
| 24 | Auriga Keskus | Kuressaare | 2008 | 16,000 m^{2} (170,000 sq ft) | | |
| 25 | Port Artur | Pärnu | 1997 | 16,000 m^{2} (170,000 sq ft) | Consists of two buildings (second built 2009), work undergoing to connect via glass gallery. | |
| 26 | Arsenal Centre (Arsenal Keskus) | Tallinn (Karjamaa) | 2016 | 15,000 m^{2} (160,000 sq ft) | Opened in old first-republic age weapons factory, which used to be called Arsenaal. | |
| 27 | Mustamäe Keskus | Tallinn (Sääse) | 2016 | 14,500 m^{2} (156,000 sq ft) | | |
| 27 | Tartu Kaubamaja | Tartu | 1966 | 14,500 m^{2} (156,000 sq ft) | | |
| 28 | Viimsi Keskus | Viimsi | 2015 | 14,000 m^{2} (150,000 sq ft) | | |
| 29 | Pärnu Keskus | Pärnu | 2009 | 12,000 m^{2} (130,000 sq ft) | | |
| 30 | Magistrali kaubanduskeskus | Tallinn (Mustamäe) | 2000 | 12,000 m^{2} (130,000 sq ft) | | |
| 31 | Jewe Keskus | Jõhvi | 2006 | 12,000 m^{2} (130,000 sq ft) | | |
| 32 | Viimsi Kaubanduskeskus | Viimsi | 2008 | 12,000 m^{2} (130,000 sq ft) | | |
| 33 | Vaala keskus | Rakvere | 2008 | 10,500 m^{2} (113,000 sq ft) | | |
| 34 | Kagukeskus | Võru | 2008 | 10,000 m^{2} (110,000 sq ft) | Expanded in 2019. | |
| 35 | Centrumi keskus | Viljandi | 1998 | 10,000 m^{2} (110,000 sq ft) | Expanded in 2013 and 2017. | |
| 36 | UKU Keskus | Viljandi | 2012 | 8,000 m^{2} (86,000 sq ft) | Expanded in 2022. | |
| 37 | Tsentraal kaubanduskeskus | Jõhvi | 2005 | 8,000 m^{2} (86,000 sq ft) | Plans underway to rebuild both centre and surrounding area. | |
* GLA unknown, total area with 0.8x coefficient.

== See also ==
- List of supermarket chains in Estonia
- List of markets in Estonia
