= Nõmme-Mustamäe Landscape Conservation Area =

Protected area in Estonia

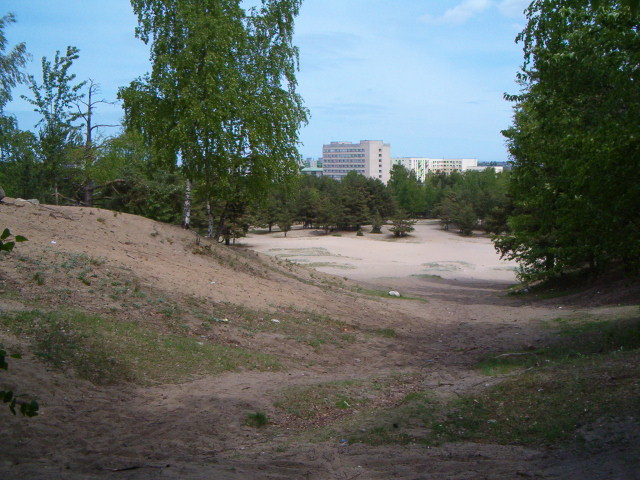

- Location within Estonia
- Location: Estonia
- Coordinates: 59°23′25″N 24°40′20″E
- Area: 201 ha (500 acres)
- Established: 2004

Nõmme-Mustamäe Landscape Conservation Area is a nature park which is located in Harju County, Estonia.

The area of the nature park is 201 ha.

The protected area was founded in 2004 to protect landforms (including Nõmme Heaths, Mustamäe Slope) and biodiversity of Nõmme-Mustamäe.
