= Ränilinn =

Neighbourhood of Tartu, Estonia

Coordinates: 58°21′12.73″N 26°40′57.72″E

- Neighbourhood of Tartu
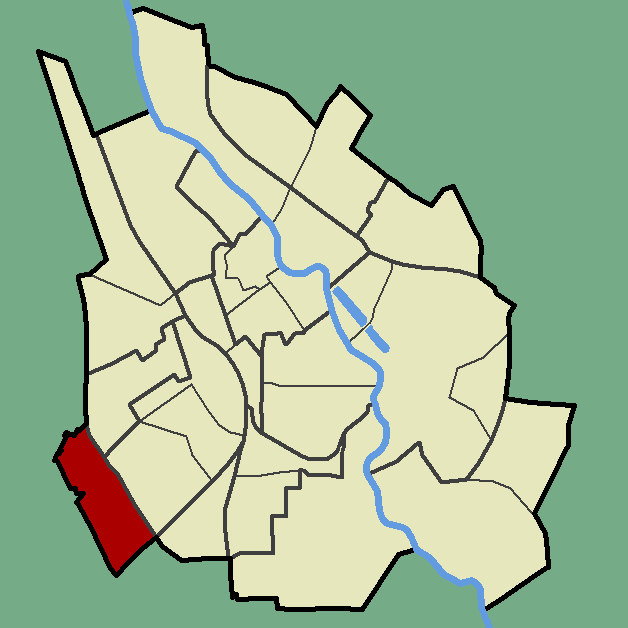
- Location of Ränilinn in Tartu.
- Country: Estonia
- County: Tartu County
- City: Tartu

Area
  - Total: 1.22 km^{2} (0.47 sq mi)

Population (31.12.2013)
  - Total: 1,674
  - Density: 1,370/km^{2} (3,550/sq mi)

Ränilinn (Estonian for "Silicon Town") is a neighbourhood of Tartu, Estonia. It has a population of 1,674 (as of 31 December 2013) and an area of 1.22 km^{2} (0.47 mi^{2}).

== See also ==
- Lõunakeskus
- Institute of Physics, University of Tartu
