= Mustamäe Ski Jumping Hill =

Ski jumping hill in Tallinn, Estonia

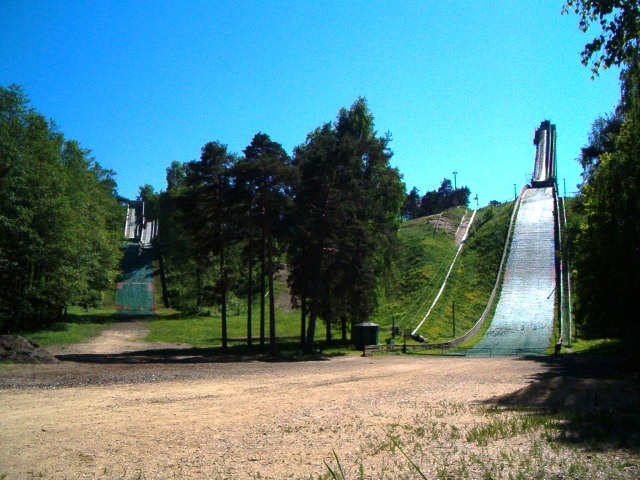
- Mustamäe Ski Jumping Hill
- Location: Mustamäe; Tallinn; Estonia
- Coordinates: 59°23′19″N 24°40′13″E

Size
- Hill record: 59 m; (Estonia) Kristjan Ilves

Mustamäe Ski Jumping Hill (Estonian: Mustamäe suusahüppemägi) is a ski jumping hill in Mustamäe, Tallinn, Estonia.

The first facility was constructed in 1935, it was K12. Later, the facility was changed to K30. During WWII, the facility fell apart.

In 1962, a new facility was built with K50. The facility was designed by Peet Samarütel.

The hill record (59 m, 13 March 2010) belongs to Kristjan Ilves.
