= Lõunakeskus =

Shopping center in Tartu, Estonia

Coordinates: 58°21′30″N 26°40′37″E

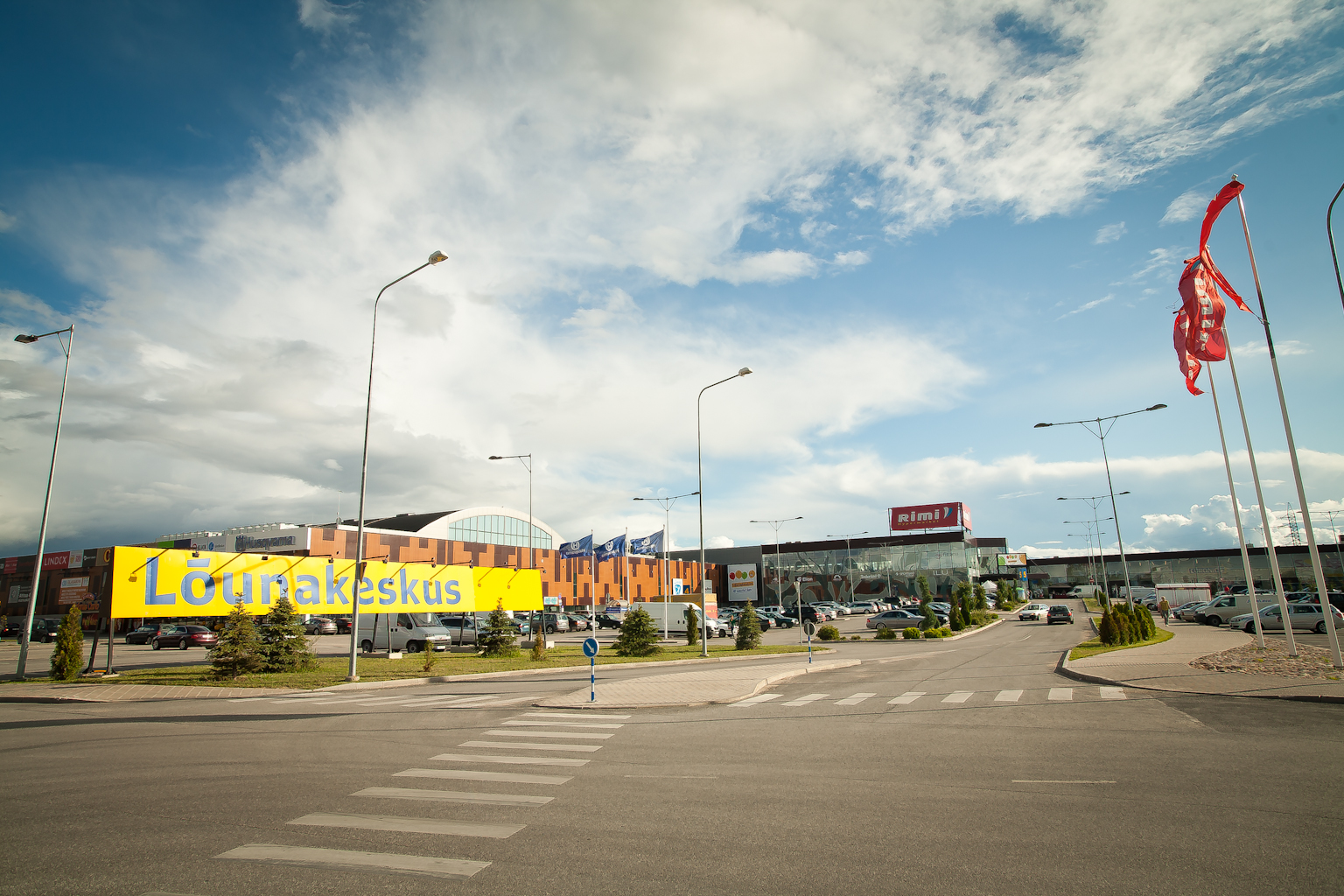
Lõunakeskus

Lõunakeskus ('Southern Center') is a shopping and entertainment complex in Tartu, Estonia. This centre of Astri Grupp and Kaubamajakas of Pro Kapital Grupp.It is the biggest shopping center in South Estonia. More than 170 shops and service providers operate in Lõunakeskus. The area of the center is 90,300 square meters, the center is visited annually by more than 5 million people.

The owner of the center is Astri Group.

The center was opened in 2001.

The center consists of e.g. a year-round ice arena (see #Astri Arena), Apollo Cinema, Sophia Hotel, adventure park.

== Astri Arena ==
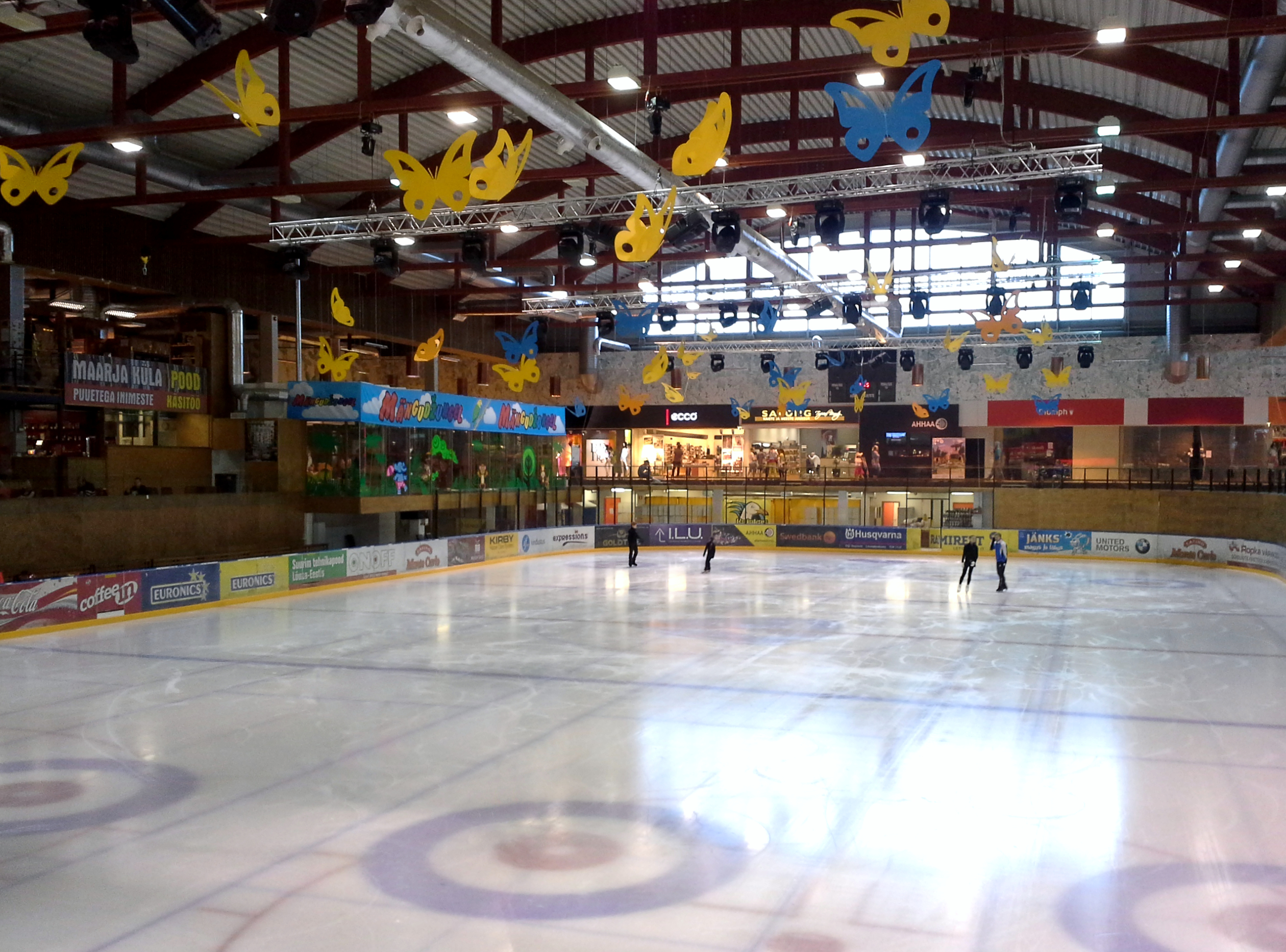
Astri Arena in 2013

Astri Arena (also Lõunakeskus Ice Hall) is an ice arena, which capacity is 600. The arena is the home arena for the ice hockey club Tartu Kalev-Välk.
