= List of markets in Estonia =

This is the list of retail markets located in Estonia. The list is incomplete.

Name	Location (city/town)	Existing years	Further info	Image
Central Market	Tallinn			
DEPOO Market (DEPOO Food Street)	Tallinn			
Nõmme Market	Tallinn, Nõmme			
Baltic Station Market	Tallinn			
Tartu Market Hall	Tartu			

== See also ==
- List of shopping malls in Estonia
