= Siili =

Subdistrict of Tallinn, Estonia

Coordinates: 59.406874°N 24.706074°E

- Subdistrict of Tallinn
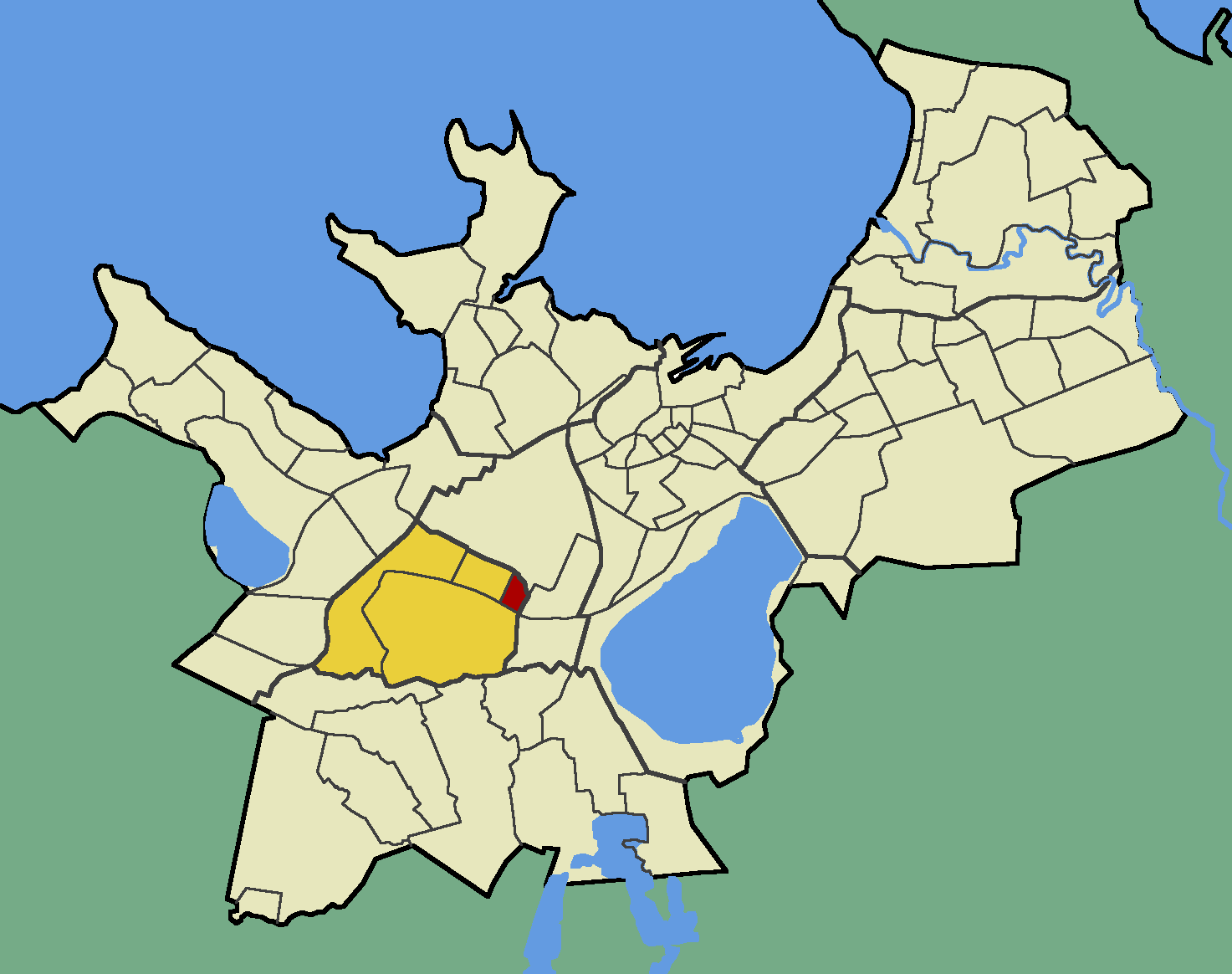
- Siili within Mustamäe District.
- Country: Estonia
- County: Harju County
- City: Tallinn
- District: Mustamäe

Population (01.01.2014)
  - Total: 3,649

Siili (Estonian for 'hedgehog') is a subdistrict (Estonian: asum) in the district of Mustamäe, Tallinn, the capital of Estonia. It has a population of 3,649 (as of 1 January 2014).

== Gallery ==
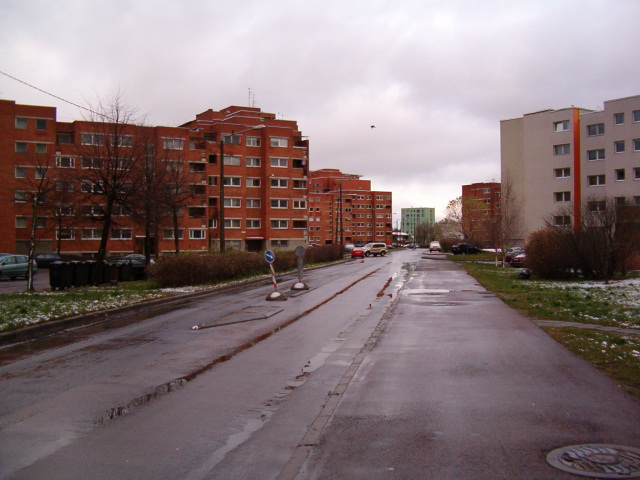

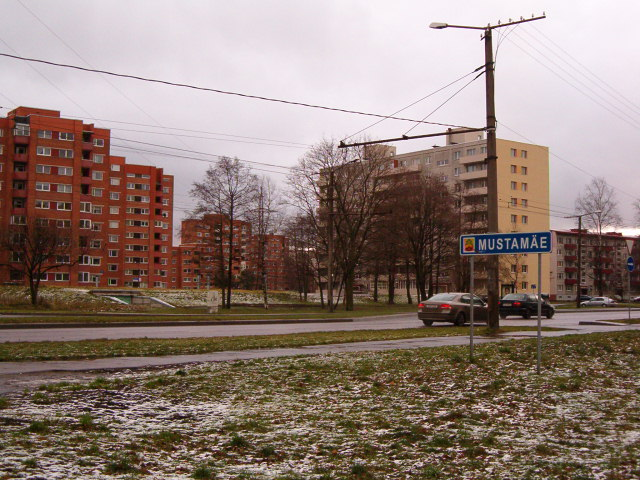

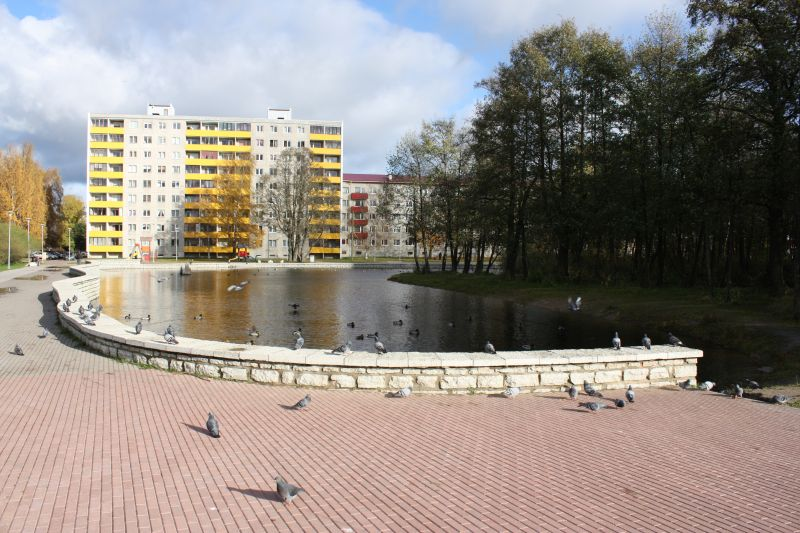
