= Järve Centre =

Shopping mall in Tallinn

Järve keskus
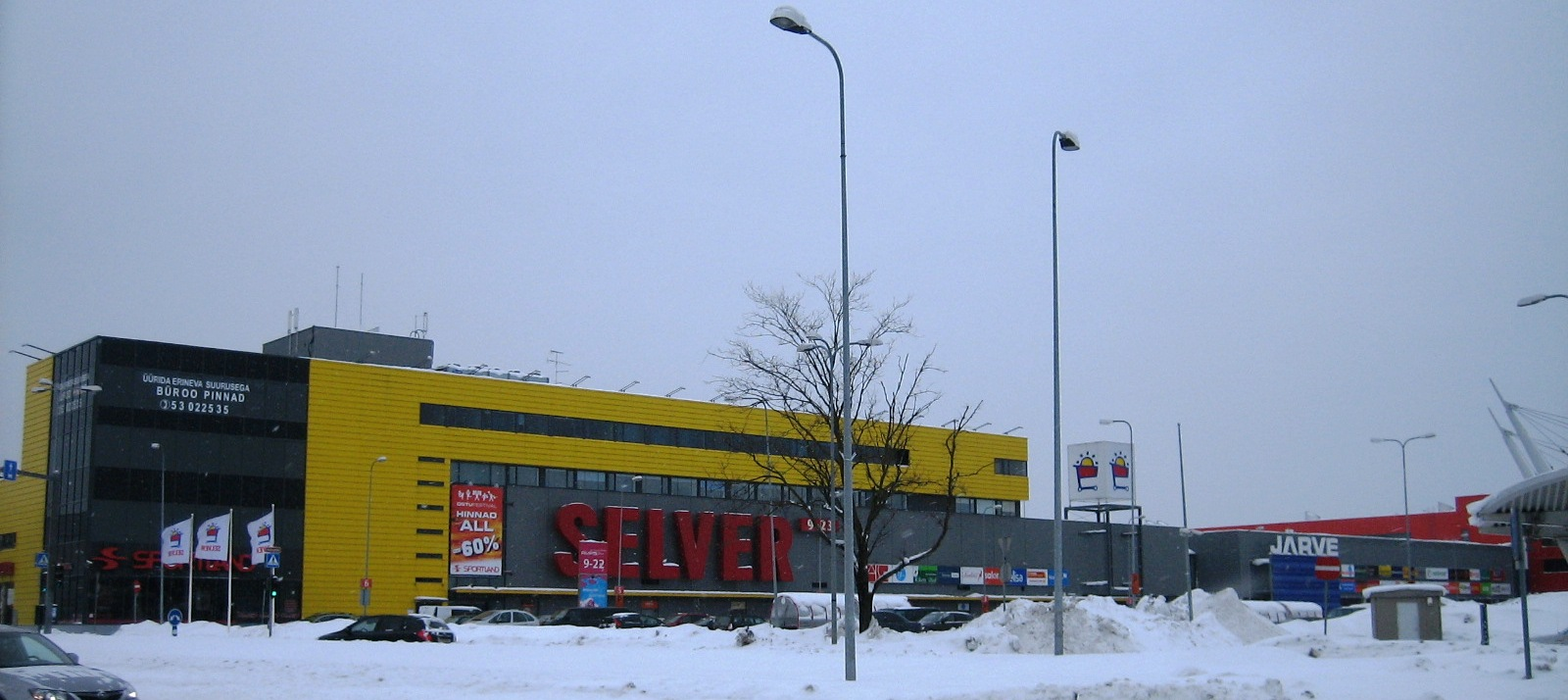
- Järve Centre(in 2010,old centre)
- Location: Tallinn, Estonia
- Coordinates: 59°23′35.87″N 24°43′12.73″E
- Address: Pärnu mnt 238
- Opened: 2002
- Owner: Järve Kaubanduskeskus OÜ & Pro Kapital Grupp
- Architect: Jaak Huimerind, Indrek Saarepera
- Num. of stores: 111
- Floor area: 43,000 square metres (462,848 sq ft)
- Floors: 3(0,1,2)
- Parking: 0 floor
- Website: www.jarvekeskus.ee

Järve Centre (Estonian: Järve keskus) is a shopping centre in southern Tallinn, Estonia. Järve Centre is the biggest shopping centre selling furnishing goods in Estonia, with a gross leasable area of 43,000 square metres containing nearly 111 different shops (including 9 restaurants and cafésAmps,Chopsticks,Da Vinci,Kebaboom,MySushi,Pizzakiosk,Poke Bowl,Usin and Coffee In & Yo!). Despite the name of Järve, the centre is located in Nõmme district's Rahumäe subdistrict. The shopping centre has three floors. The biggest shops in the centre are Selver,Seiklusmaa, Sportland, and Diivaniparadiis.

Järve Centre opened its doors in 2002. In addition to furnishing goods, Järve Centre offers a large selection of leisure and sporting goods, footwear and clothing, children's goods and different services. And 2025 in center opened Sinsay In 2010 year group Pro Kapital Grupp the owner of center.
