= Kaubamajakas =

Shopping center in Pärnu, Estonia

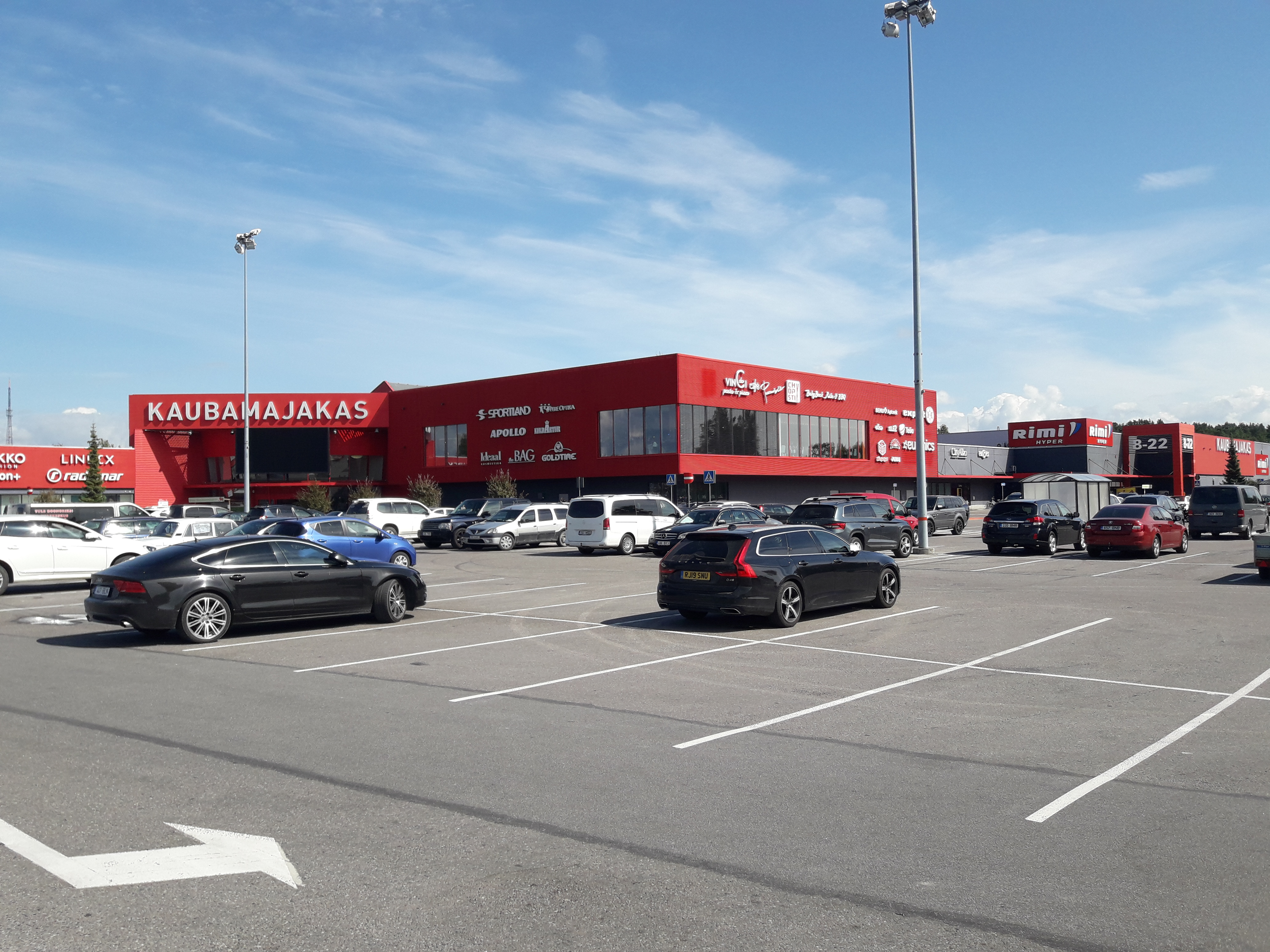
- Kaubamajakas in 2020
- Location: Pärnu, Estonia
- Coordinates: 58°22′14″N 24°33′01″E
- Address: Papiniidu 8, Pärnu, 80010 Pärnu maakond, Estonia
- Opened: 2004
- Developer: Pro Kapital Grupp
- Floor area: 23,000 m²
- Floors: 2
- Website: kaubamajakas.ee

Kaubamajakas is a shopping mall in Pärnu, Estonia. It is the biggest shopping mall in Pärnu.

The mall was opened on 13 May 2004 and has a total area of 23,000 m² the owner-Pro Kapital Grupp anowner since 2014.

In 2007, the center was expanded and the number of tenants increased to 55. During the 2014 expansion, a restaurant floor was added. After the last expansion, the total area of the center is 23,500 square meters, of which 18,400 square meters is leasable. In the new conditions, the center has about 65 shops and service providers. In 2024 a new part opened with a Euronics next to Apollo and in Pärnu opened a Skechers and opened a Pärnu Skypark and a T1 Mall of Tallinn the old part Euronics this now a Sports Direct. Euronics before is in a 3 part a now a 4 part and center Takko Fashion too in a new part and Euronics and Takko Fashion in a new part.
