= Helle Kalda =

Estonian politician

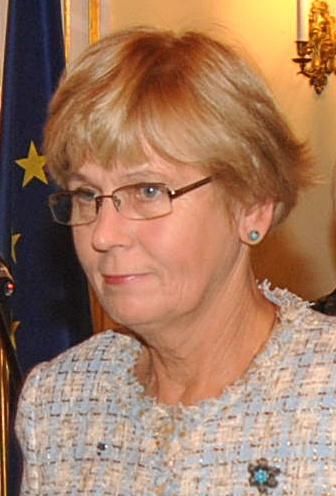
Helle Kalda in 2010.

Helle Kalda (born 17 February 1950 in Tartu) is an Estonian politician. She has been member of X and XI Riigikogu.

She is a member of Estonian Centre Party.
