= Tasku Shopping Centre =

Shopping mall in Tartu, Estonia

- Tasku Keskus
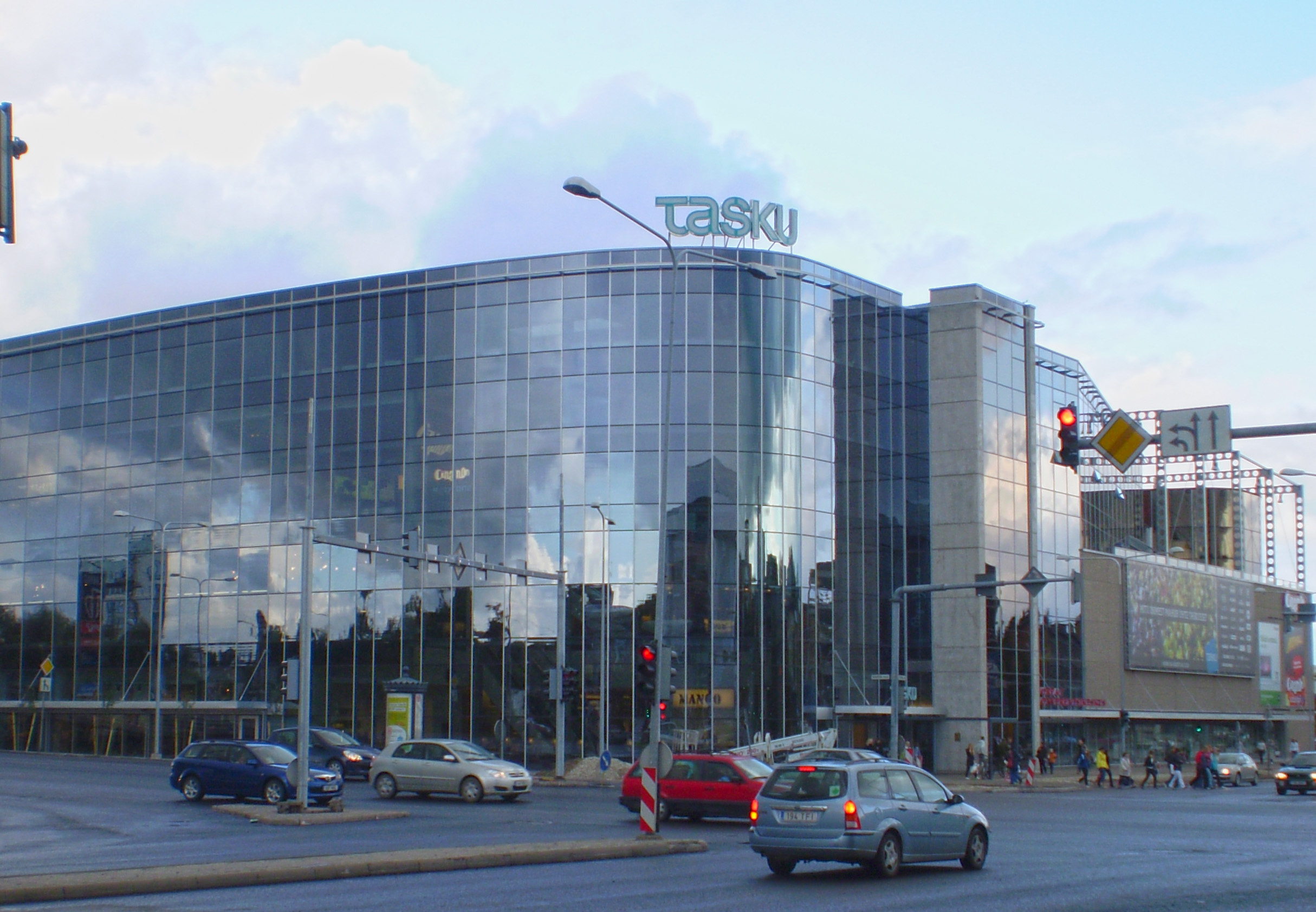
- Tasku Shopping Centre in 2008
- Location: Tartu, Estonia
- Coordinates: 58°22′40″N 26°43′50″E
- Address: Turu 2, 51004 Tartu, Estonia
- Opened: 2008
- Website: tasku.ee

Tasku Shopping Centre (Estonian: Tasku Keskus, abbreviated Tasku) is a shopping mall in Tartu, Estonia. Next to Tasku is located Emajõe Business Centre.

Tasku was opened in 2008. The building was designed by Kalle Rõõmuse. Style of the building is Modern architectism. Arhitektuuribüroo, and interior works were done by Vaikla Disain.

Besides many shops, Tasku accommodates also a multiplex cinema Cinamon (until 2020) is now Apollo Cinema(since 2024), Dorpat Conference Centre and a large book store (Rahva Raamat).
