= Kadaka, Tallinn =

Subdistrict of Tallinn, Estonia

Coordinates: 59.410915°N 24.664907°E

Kadaka
- Subdistrict of Tallinn
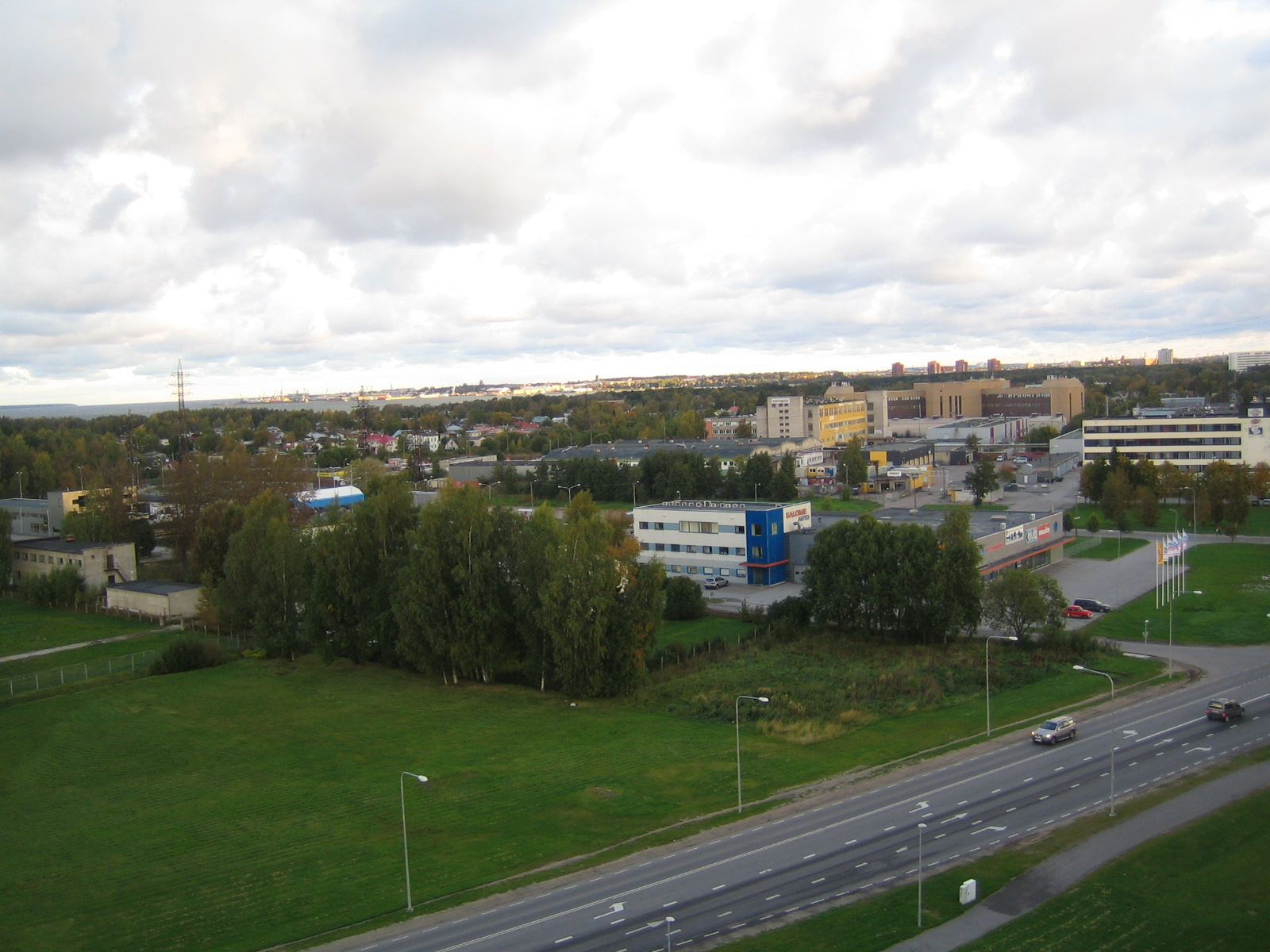

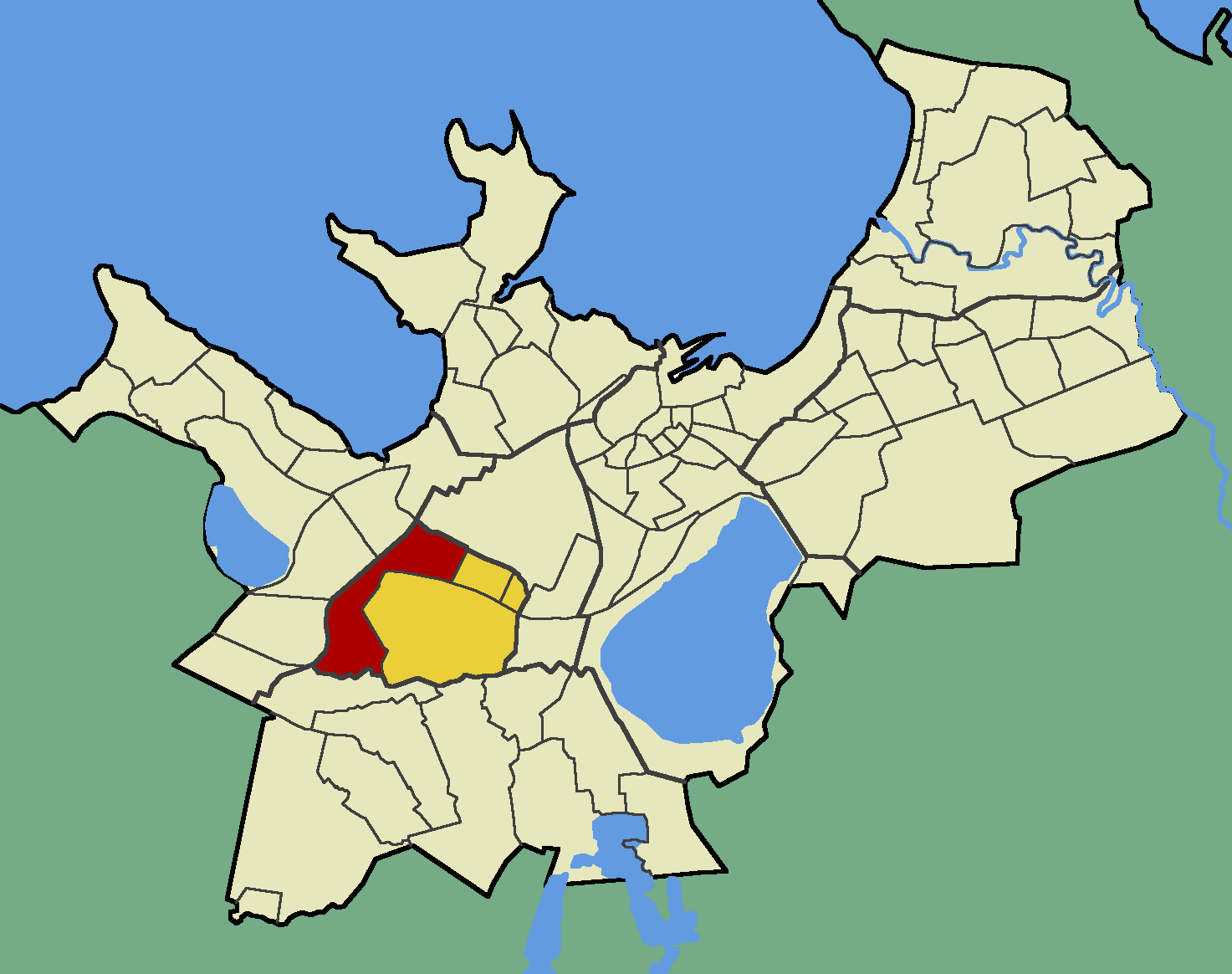
- Kadaka within Mustamäe District.
- Country: Estonia
- County: Harju County
- City: Tallinn
- District: Mustamäe

Population (01.01.2020)
  - Total: 4,817

Kadaka (Estonian for "Juniper") is a subdistrict (Estonian: asum) in the district of Mustamäe, Tallinn, the capital of Estonia. It has a population of 4,817 (As of 1 January 2020).

== Gallery ==
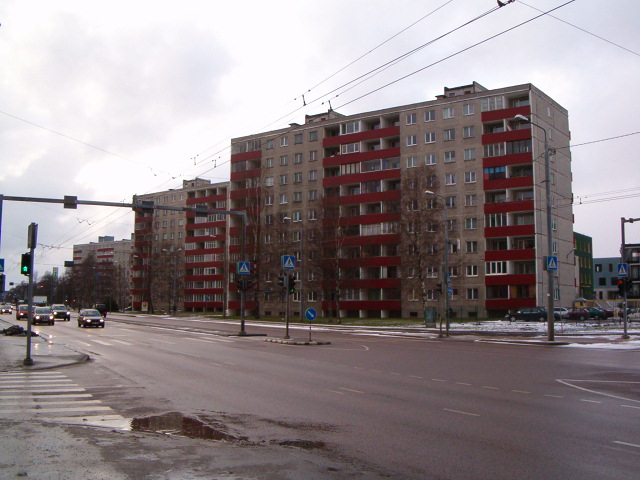

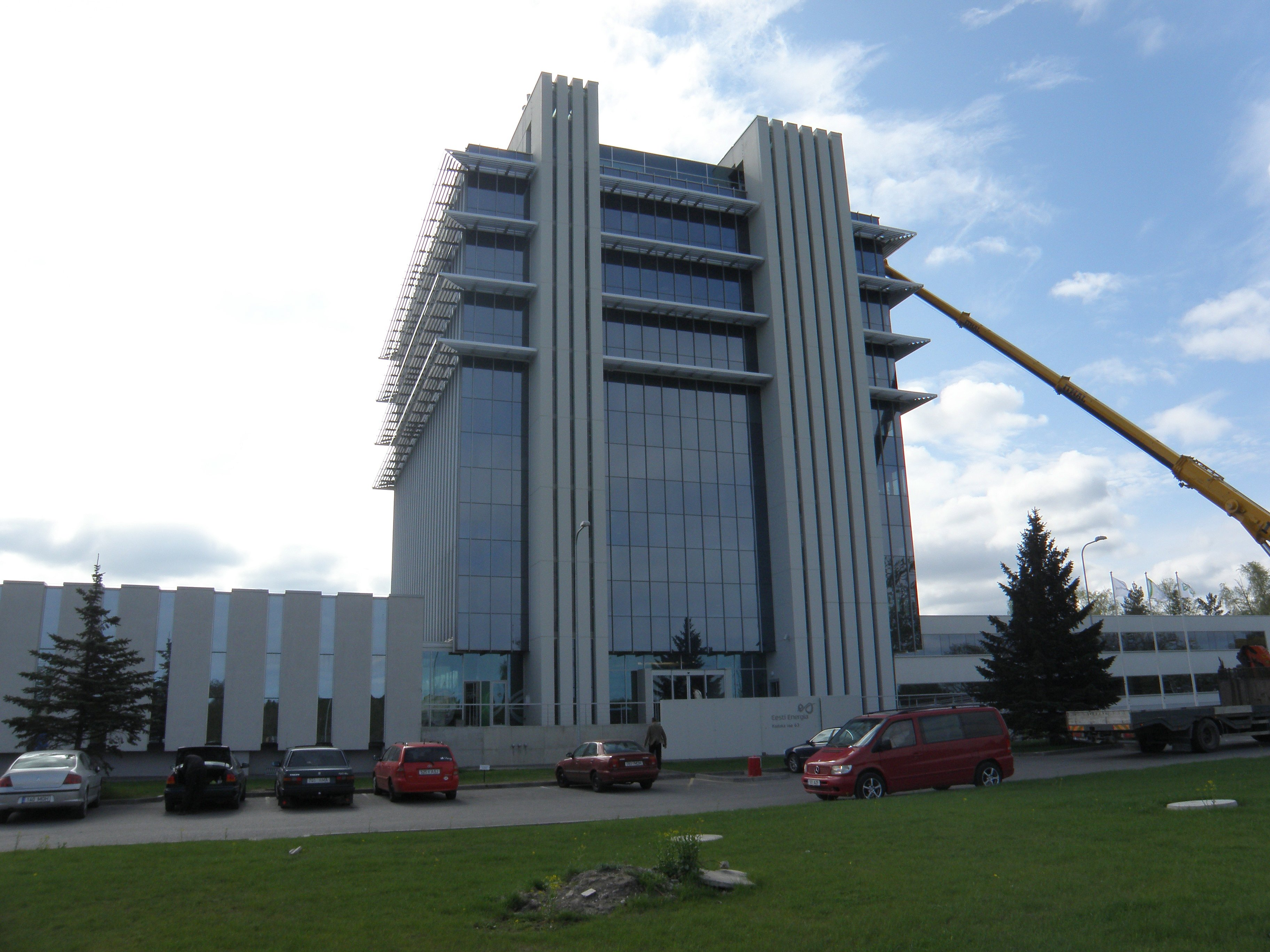
Headquarters of Eesti Energia

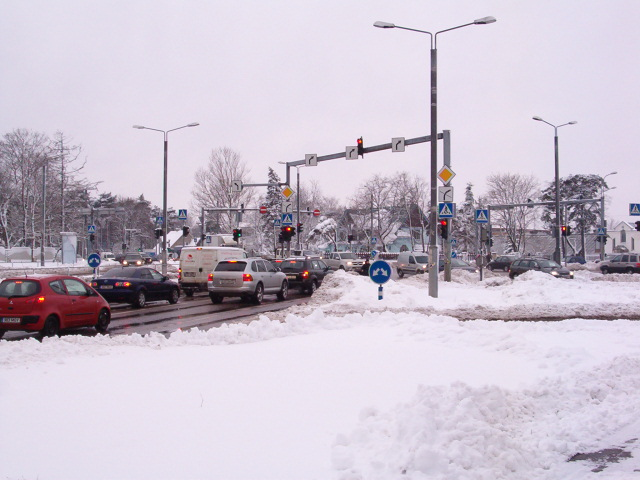
Main junction in Kadaka
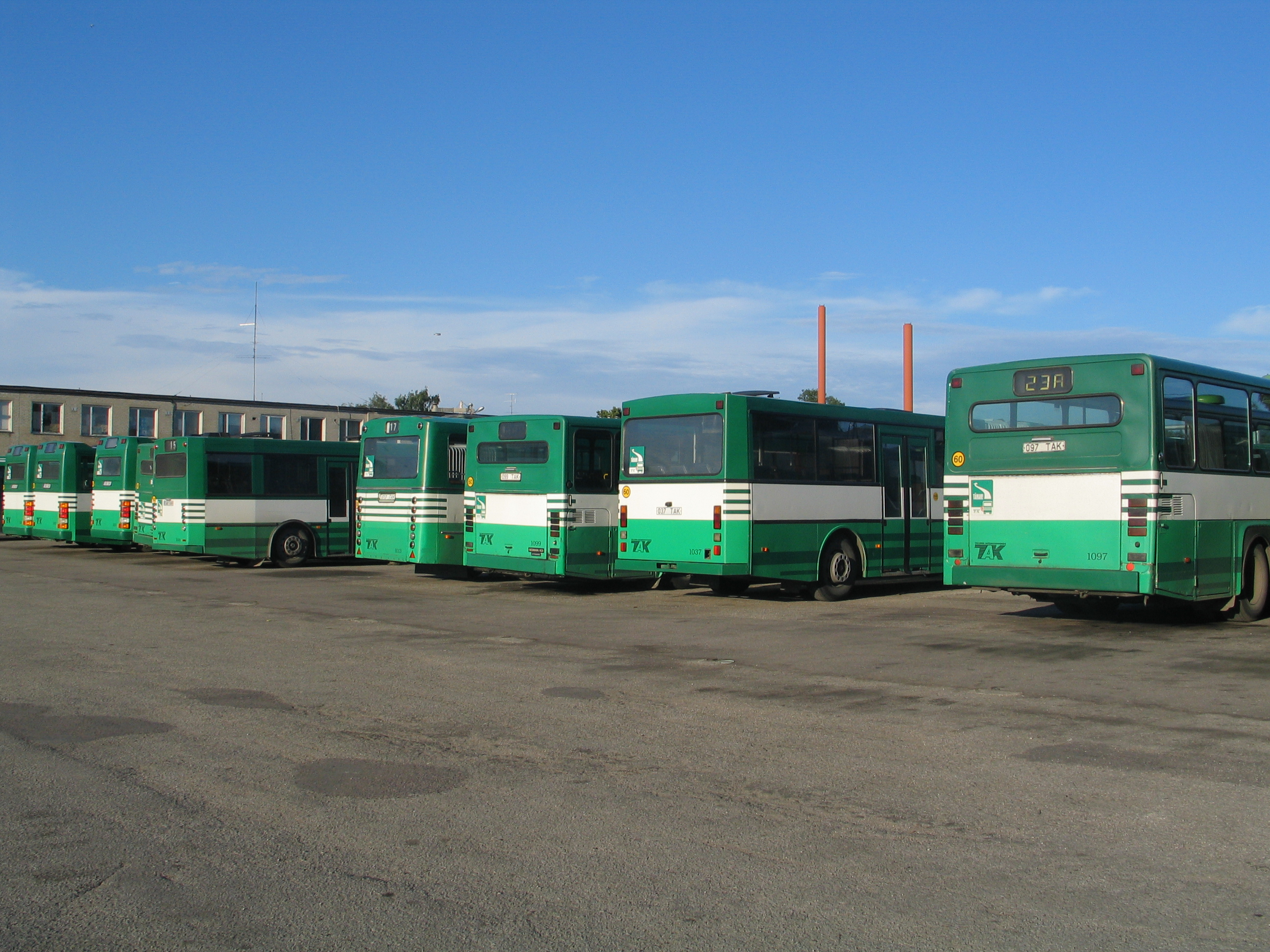
Parking near TAK office

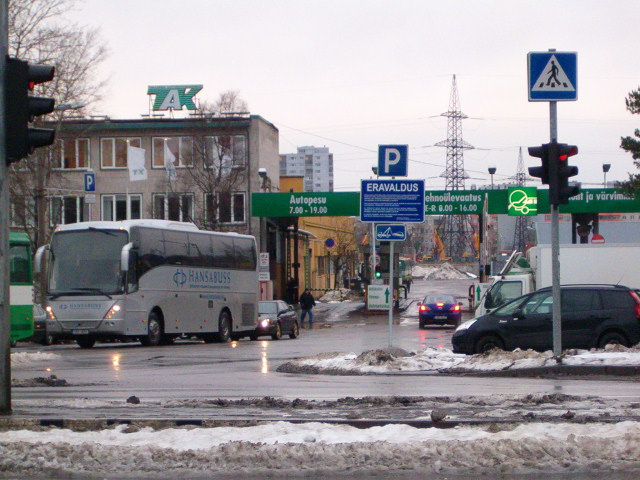
Tallinn Bus Company

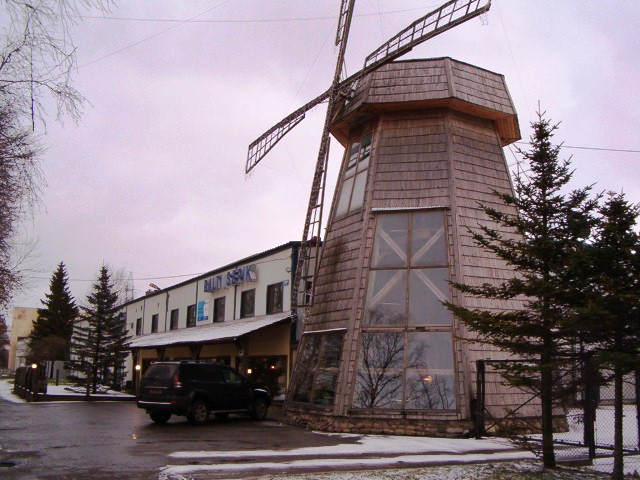
