= Pro Kapital Grupp =

Company based in Estonia

Pro Kapital Grupp is an Estonian real estate development company which focuses on large-scale commercial and residential real estate projects in Baltics' capitals (Tallinn, Riga, Vilnius) Centers Eeden(in 2009),Kvartal(in 2016),Järve Centre(in 2010),Kaubamajakas(in 2014),T1 Mall of Tallinn(in 2018) & Mustamäe Centre(in 2016).

The company is established in 1994. The company has a total of 106 employees in Estonia, Latvia, Lithuania and Germany.

Since 2012, the company is listed in Nasdaq Tallinn.

Notable objects are, for example: residential area in Kalaranna District, Kristiine City, Kliversala quarter, Saltiniu Namai Attico, T1 Mall of Tallinn.
