= Mustamäe (subdistrict) =

Subdistrict of Tallinn, Estonia

Coordinates: 59.400922°N 24.677525°E

- Subdistrict of Tallinn
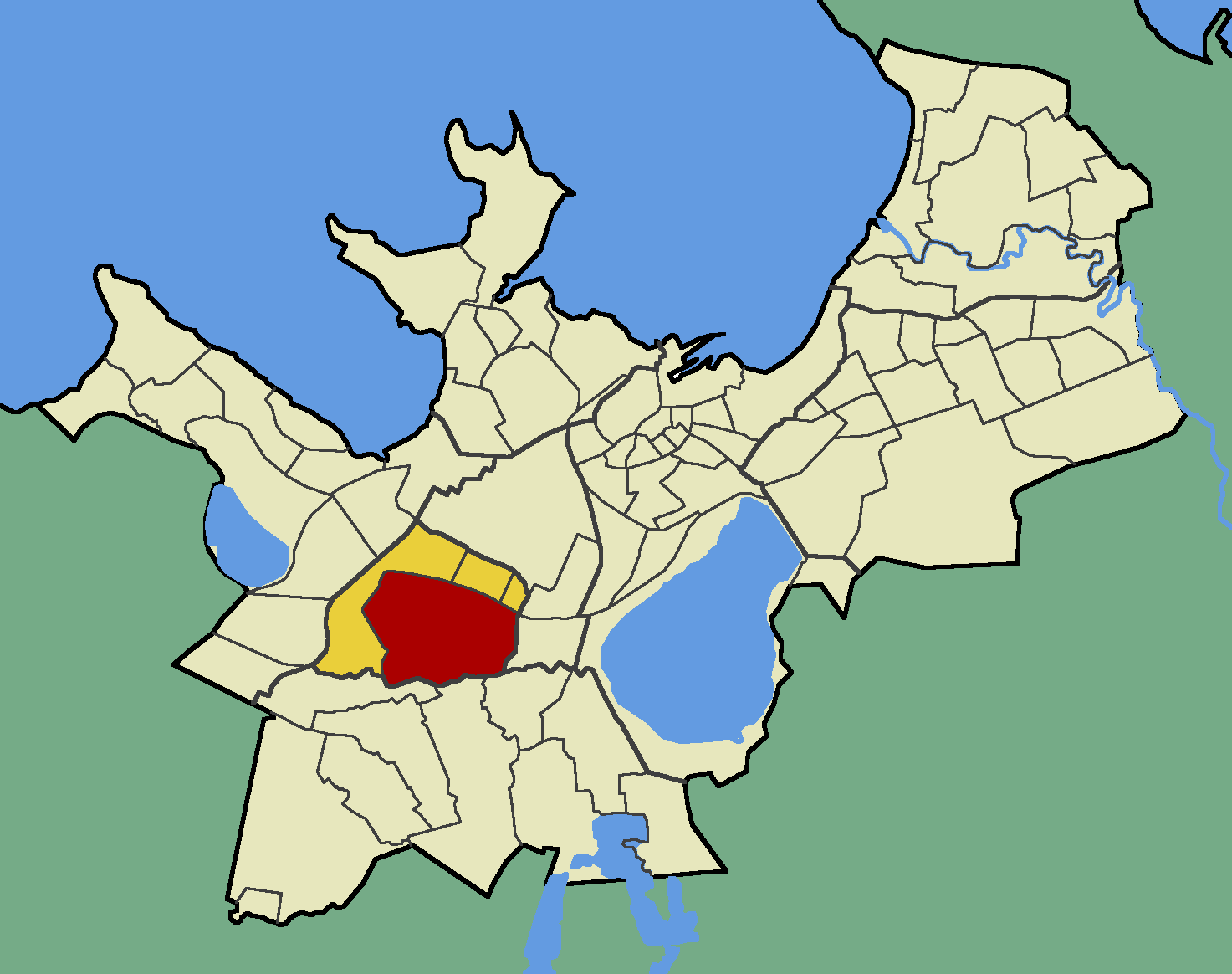
- Mustamäe subdistrict within Mustamäe District.
- Country: Estonia
- County: Harju County
- City: Tallinn
- District: Mustamäe

Population (01.01.2015)
  - Total: 50,688

Mustamäe (Estonian for "Black Hill") is a subdistrict (Estonian: asum) in the district of Mustamäe, Tallinn, the capital of Estonia. It has a population of 50,688 (As of 1 January 2015).

== Gallery ==
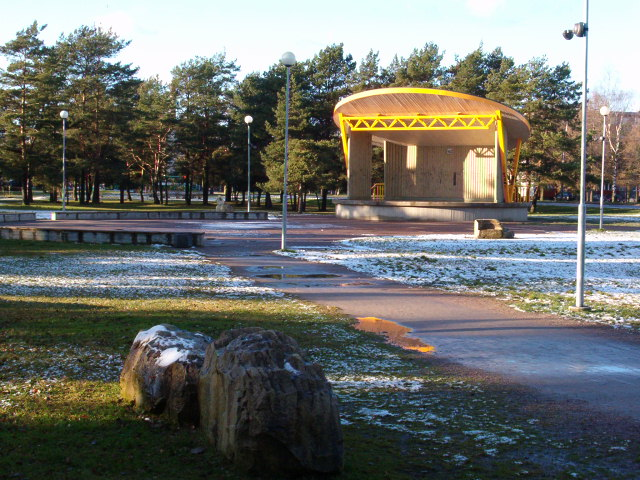
Männi park

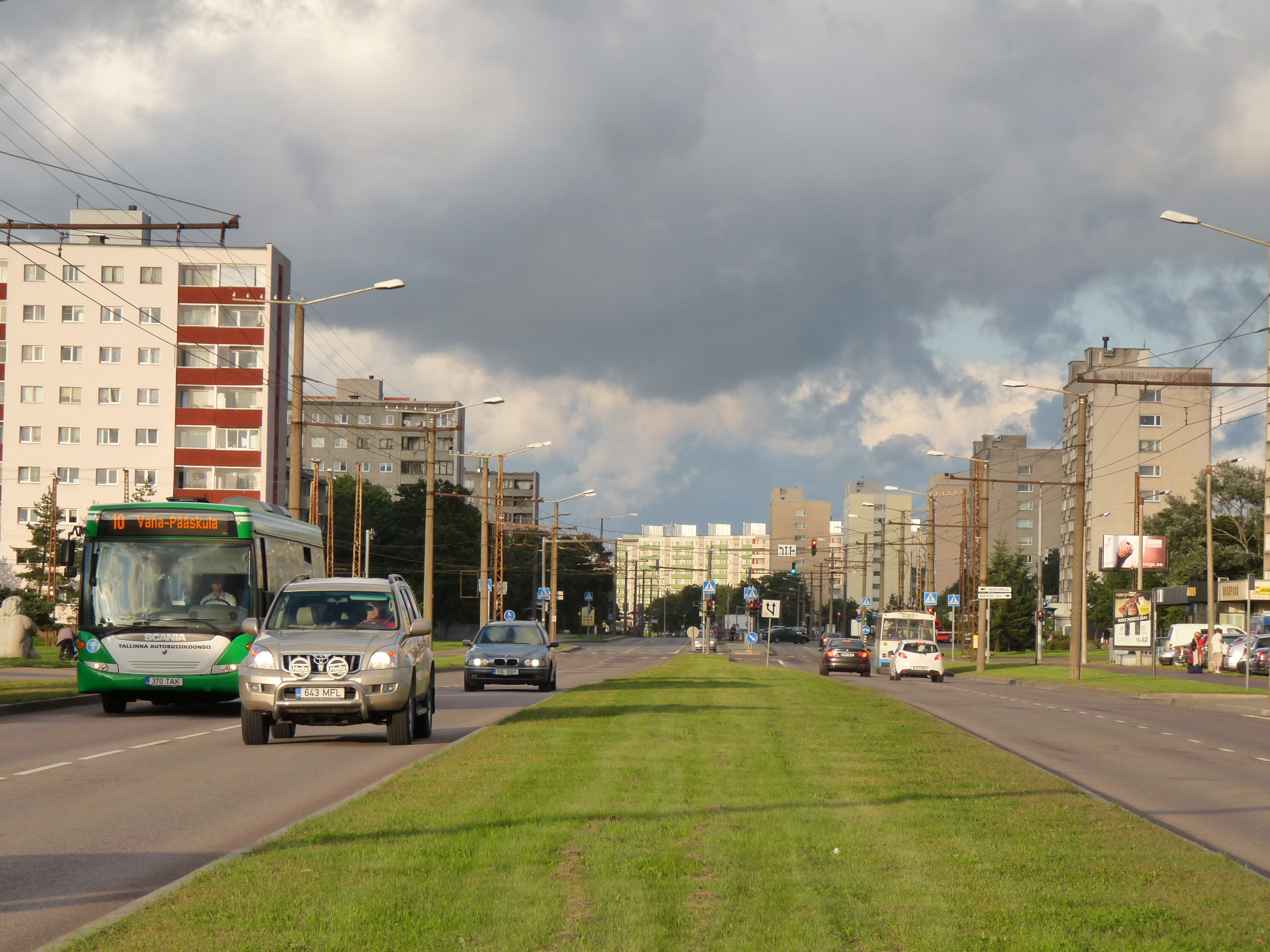
Sõpruse puiestee

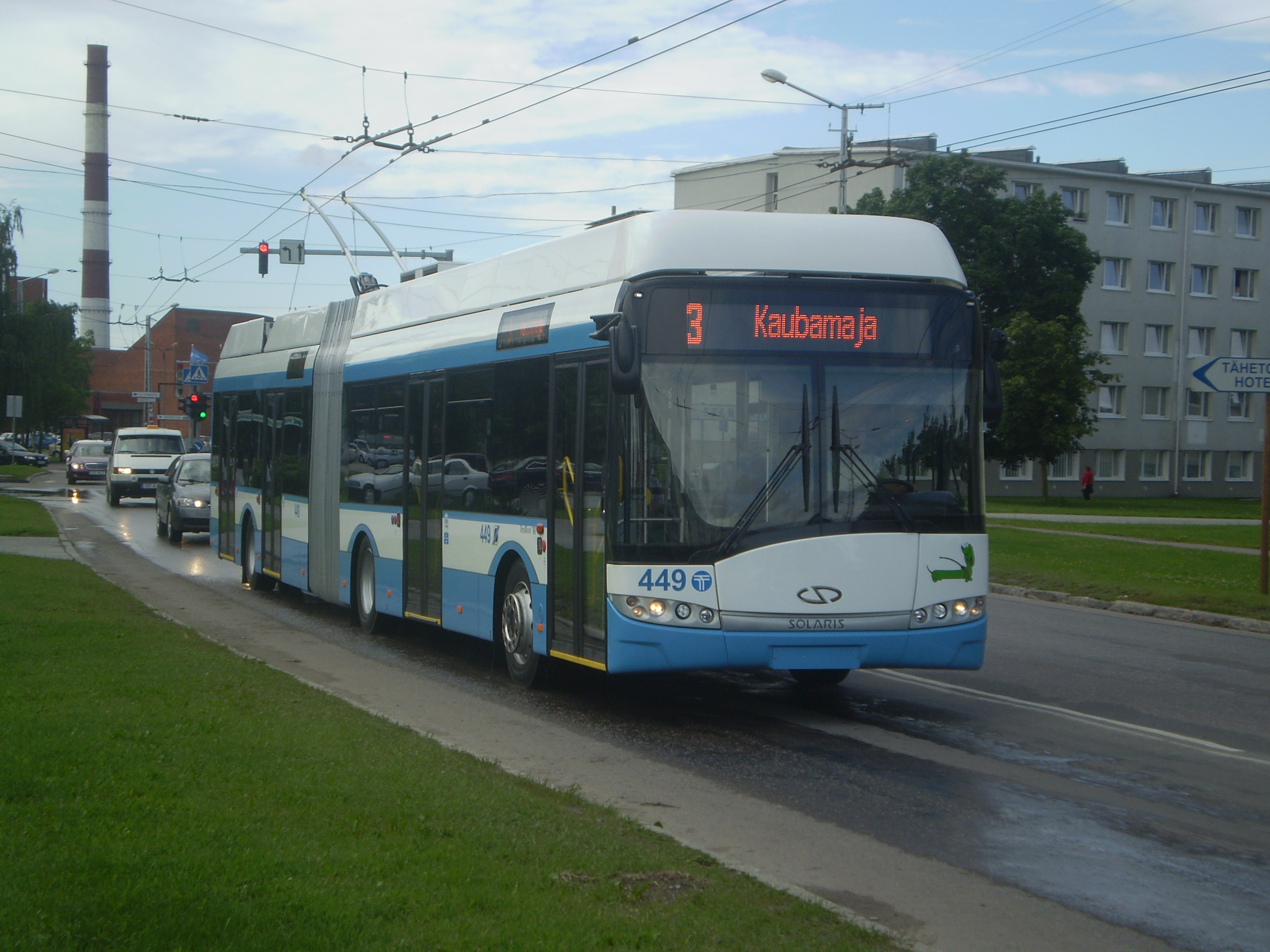
Akadeemia street
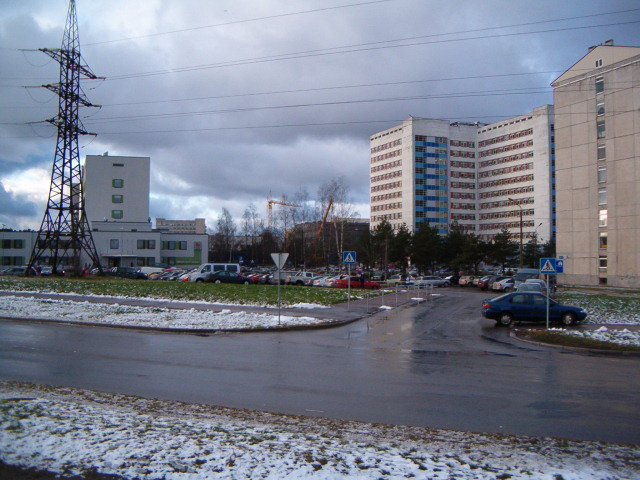
Mustamäe hospital

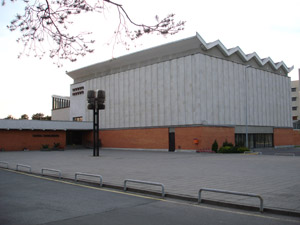
Main building of Tallinn University of Technology

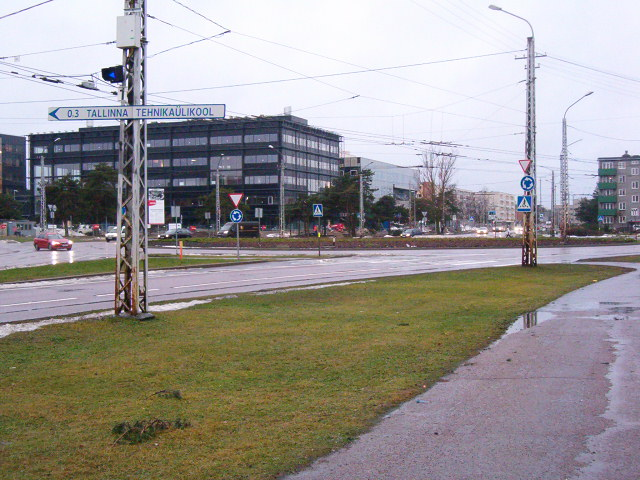
Sõpruse, Ehitajate and Akadeemia roundabout

== See also ==
- TTÜ Sports Hall
