= Mustamäe =

District of Tallinn, Estonia

- District of Tallinn
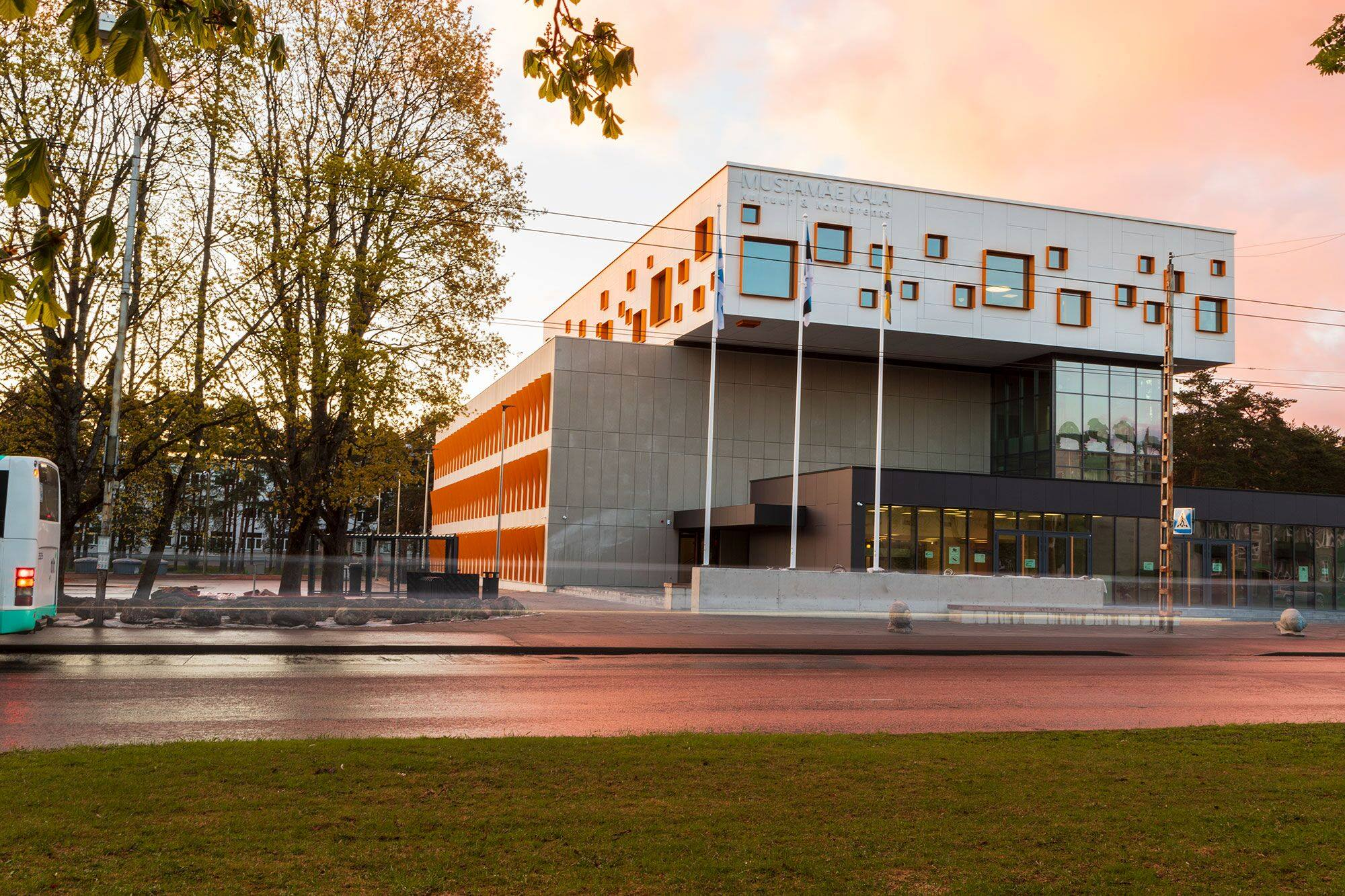
- Mustamäe District Administration

- Flag Coat of arms

- Location of Mustamäe in Tallinn.
- Coordinates: 59°24′17″N 24°40′50″E
- Country: Estonia
- County: Harju County
- City: Tallinn

Government
  - District Elder: Marja-Liisa Veiser (Isamaa)

Area
  - Total: 8.1 km^{2} (3.1 sq mi)

Population (01.08.2020)
  - Total: 66,485
  - Density: 8,200/km^{2} (21,000/sq mi)
- Website: tallinn.ee

Mustamäe (Estonian for 'black hill') is one of the 8 administrative districts (Estonian: linnaosa) of Tallinn, the capital of Estonia. The smallest by area (it covers only 8.1 km^{2}), it is at the same time the second largest district by population with 66,305 inhabitants (As of 1 November 2014). It is located 5 km from the centre of Tallinn and is bordered by the districts of Haabersti, Nõmme, and Kristiine. Local housing is mostly represented by panel blocks of flats five to nine storeys high, built in the 1960 to 1970s.

== Geography ==
Mustamäe covers 8.1 km^{2} and is located 5 km from the centre of Tallinn. Mustamäe is bordered by the streets Tuuliku, Kadaka tee, Tildri, Siili, Nõmme tee, Retke tee, Ehitajate tee, Üliõpilaste tee, Raja, Soone, Lossi, Mäepealse, Kadaka puiestee, Järveotsa tee. Mustamäe is bordered by Nõmme hill (part of the Baltic Klint) in the south and Tallinn Zoo in the northwest.

Mustamäe is divided into four subdistricts (Estonian: asum):

- Kadaka
- Mustamäe
- Siili
- Sääse

== History ==
Established in 1962 and completed in 1973 as a microdistrict, Mustamäe was Tallinn's first large district. Similar districts, Õismäe and Lasnamäe were completed later.

== Population ==
Mustamäe has a population of 68,548 (As of 1 January 2025).

Ethnicity	1989		2000		2011		2021	
Ethnicity	amount	%	amount	%	amount	%	amount	%
Estonians	42210	53.9	40493	59.7	37657	60.5	38256	57.7
Russians	28387	36.3	21584	31.8	20307	32.6	20237	30.5
Ukrainians	-	-	-	-	1592	2.56	2142	3.23
Belarusians	-	-	-	-	855	1.37	829	1.25
Finns	-	-	-	-	321	0.52	445	0.67
Jews	-	-	-	-	256	0.41	202	0.30
Latvians	-	-	-	-	76	0.12	168	0.25
Germans	-	-	-	-	63	0.10	148	0.22
Tatars	-	-	-	-	142	0.23	149	0.22
Poles	-	-	-	-	118	0.19	130	0.20
Lithuanians	-	-	-	-	115	0.18	138	0.21
unknown	1	0.00	507	0.75	158	0.25	459	0.69
other	7672	9.80	5258	7.75	595	0.96	3030	4.57
Total	78270	100	67842	100	62255	100	66333	100

Population development
Year	2004	2005	2006	2007	2008	2009	2010	2011	2012	2013	2014
Population	64,918	65,837	65,692	64,500	64,243	64,339	64,113	64,597	64,237	64,425	65,866

== Landmarks and institutions ==
Tallinn University of Technology

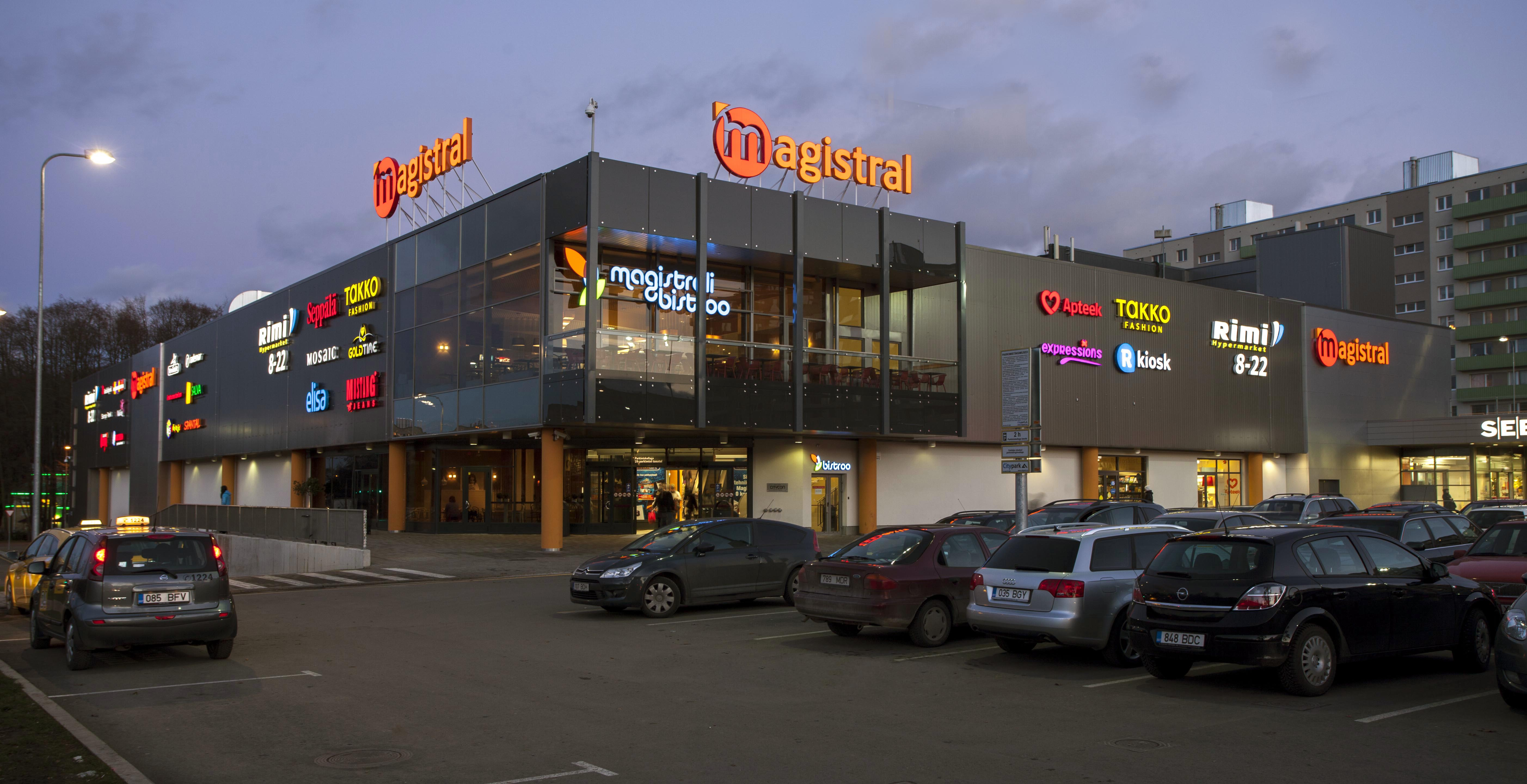
Magistral shopping mall

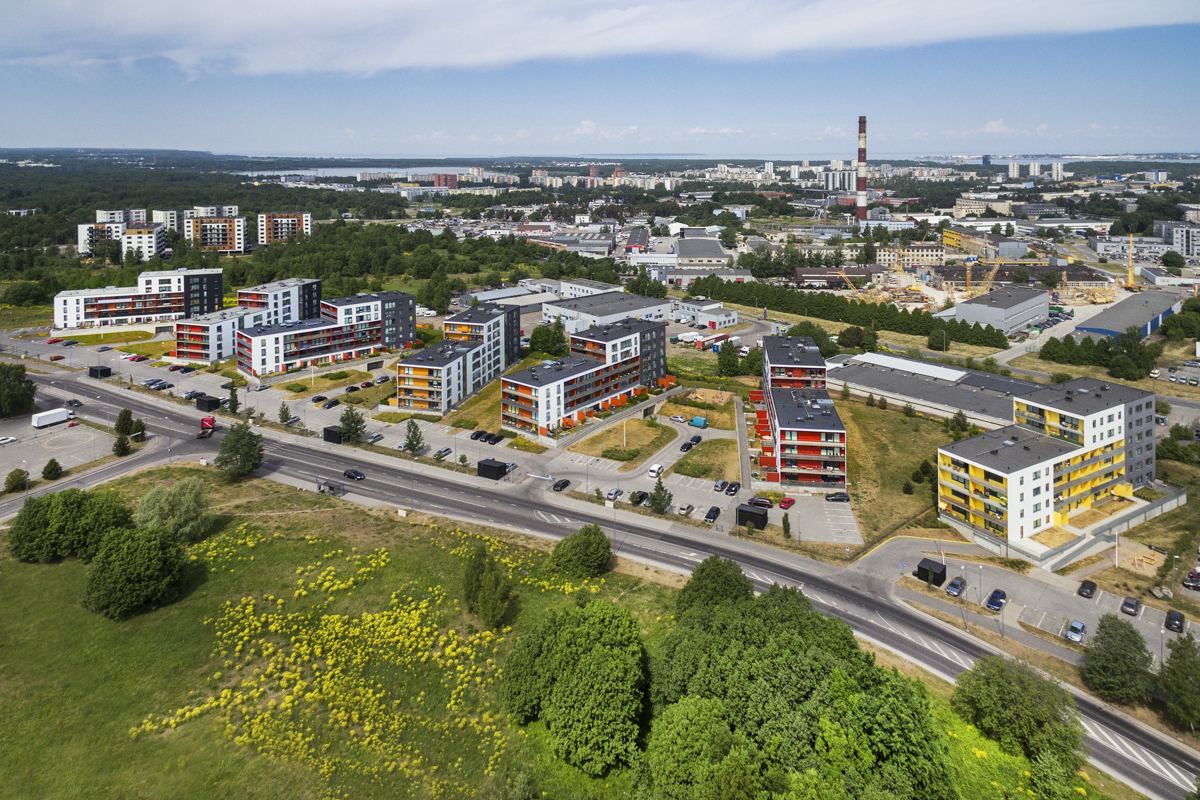
Apartments on Mäepealse street

- Tallinn Bus Company
- Tallinn University of Technology
  - TTÜ Sports Hall
- Estonian Information Technology College
- Mustamäe Regional Hospital
- National Institute of Chemical Physics and Biophysics
- "Tehnopol" Technology Park including the headquarters of Skype
- Center of culture "Kaja"
- Conference center "Sütiste maja"
- Mustamäe Boiler Plant with a 125-m chimney
- Männi Park
- Shopping centre "Mustamäe Kaubanduskeskus"
- Shopping center "Magistral"
- Marketplace "Szolnoki turg" (named after the bus stop "Szolnok", which in turn is named after the town Szolnok in Hungary)
- Headquarters of Eesti Energia
- Tiit Soku Korvpallikool (Tiit Sokk Basketball School)
- Nightclub "Aspirin"
- Sculpture "Mõtlik mees" (Thoughtful man) by Tauno Kangro

=== Schools ===
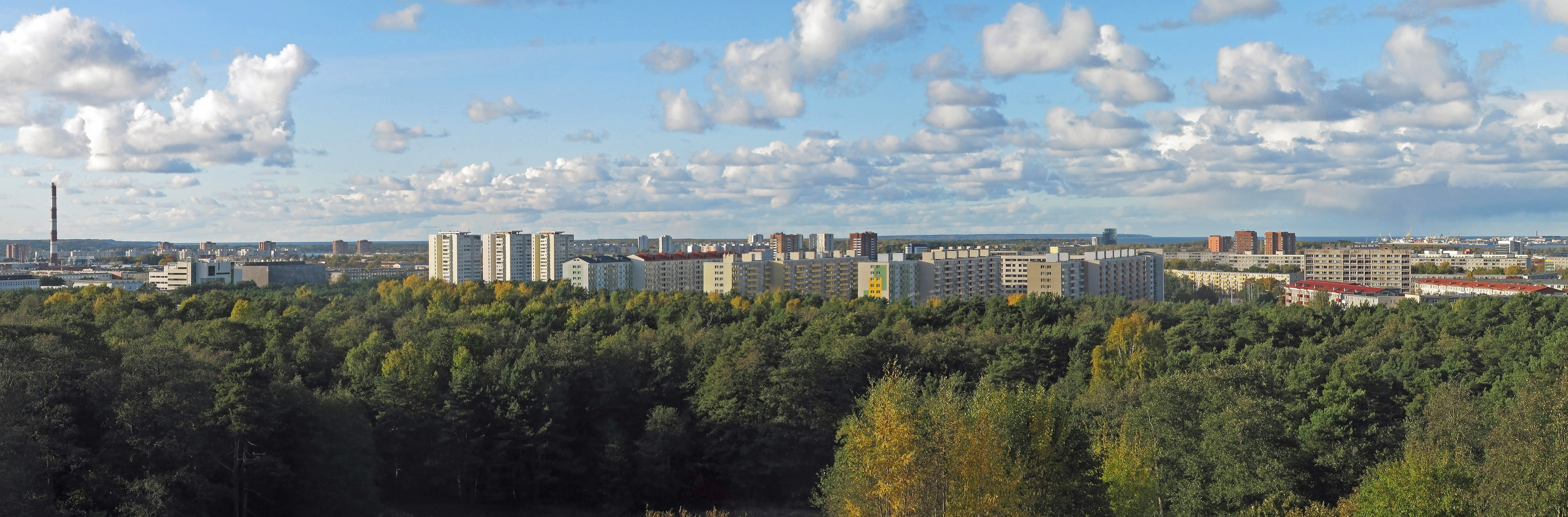
View of Mustamäe from Nõmme

- Tallinna 32. Keskkool
- Tallinna 37. Keskkool
- Tallinna 53. Keskkool
- Tallinna 63. Põhikool
- Tallinna Arte Gümnaasium (former School No. 49)
- Eurogümnaasium
- Tallinna Mustamäe Gümnaasium (former School No. 44)
- Tallinna Mustamäe Humanitaargümnaasium (former School No. 52)
- Tallinna Mustamäe Reaalgümnaasium (former School No. 51)
- Tallinna Saksa Gümnaasium (former School No. 54)
- Tallinna Tehnikagümnaasium (former School No. 43)

== Transportation ==
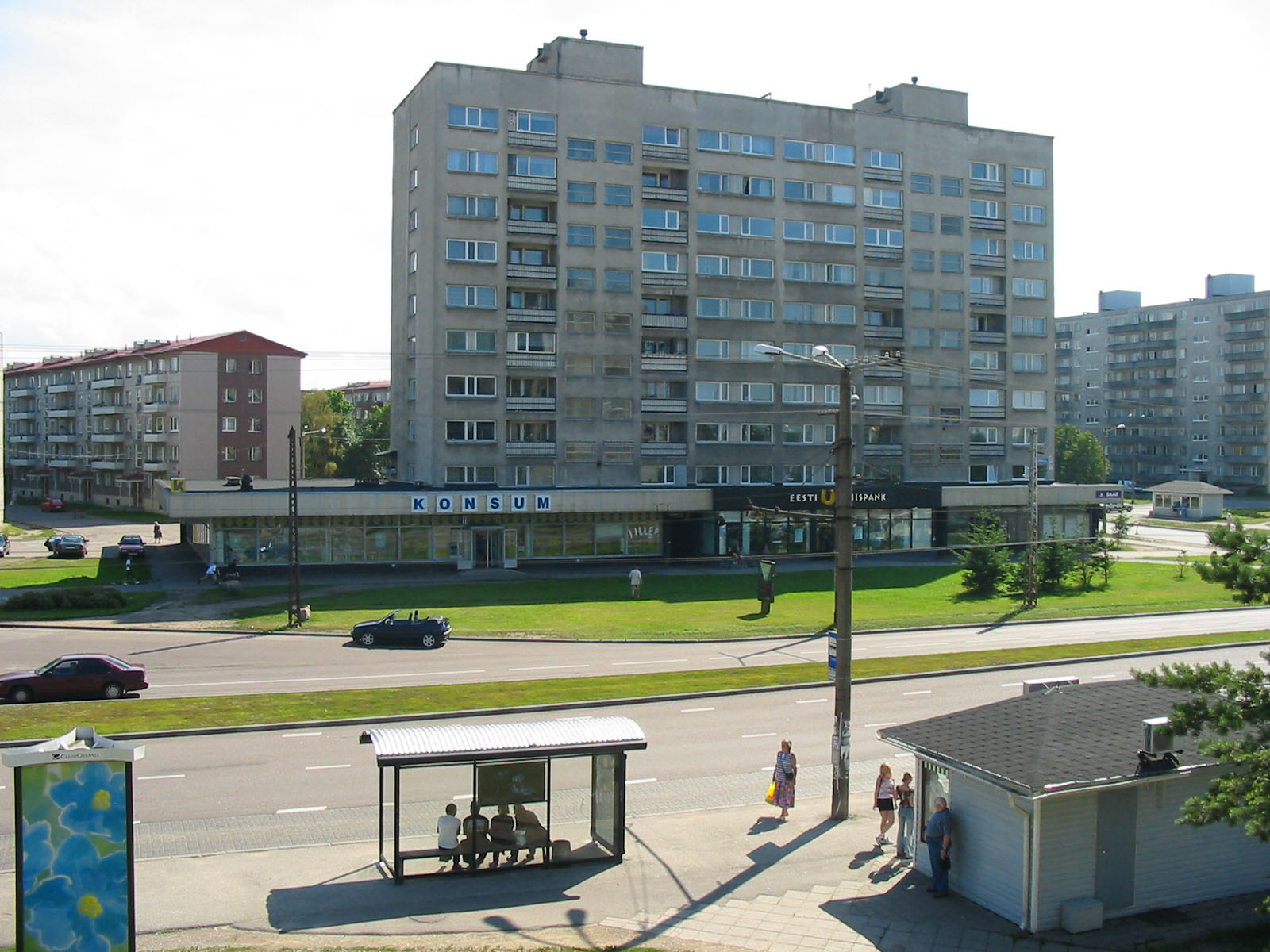
Bus stop on Sõpruse puiestee

Mustamäe is connected to the rest of Tallinn via three main streets: Mustamäe tee and Sõpruse puiestee lead to the centre of Tallinn, and Ehitajate tee crosses Mustamäe while connecting Nõmme and Õismäe. Other major streets include: A. H. Tammsaare tee, Kadaka tee, Ed. Vilde tee, and Akadeemia tee. Most of the public transportation operates on these streets. Mustamäe is serviced by buses and trolleybuses. Out the 4 trolleybus lines of Tallinn, all 4 operate (partly) in Mustamäe. However, trolleybuses are being replaced currently, and they are replaced by buses.

== Government ==
List of District Elders (linnaosavanem) of Mustamäe:

Years	Name	Party
1993	Ain Lillepalu	
1993–1999	Jevgeni Tomberg	United People's Party
1999	Vladimir Ivanov	United People's Party
1999–2000	Pavel Starostin	United People's Party
2000–2001	Voldemar Trumm	United People's Party
2001–2004	Helle Kalda	Centre Party
2004	Aivar Riisalu	Centre Party
2004–2005	Mario Sootna	People's Union
2005–2009	Kalle Mihkels	Centre Party
2009–2011	Lauri Laats	Social Democrats
2011–present	Helle Kalda	Centre Party

== Cultural significance ==
Books:

- "The Autumn Ball: Scenes of City Life" (1979) by Mati Unt (translated from Estonian by Mart Aru)
- "Mustamäe armastus" (1978) by Arvo Valton
- "Minu Mustamäe" (2013) by Armin Kõomägi

Songs:

- "Mustamäe valss" (Mustamäe Walz), composed by Avo Tamme; lyrics by Heldur Karmo
- "Kus on mu kodu"' (Where is my home?), by Agent M
