= Sääse, Tallinn =

Subdistrict of Tallinn, Estonia

Coordinates: 59.409583°N 24.69718°E

Sääse
- Subdistrict of Tallinn
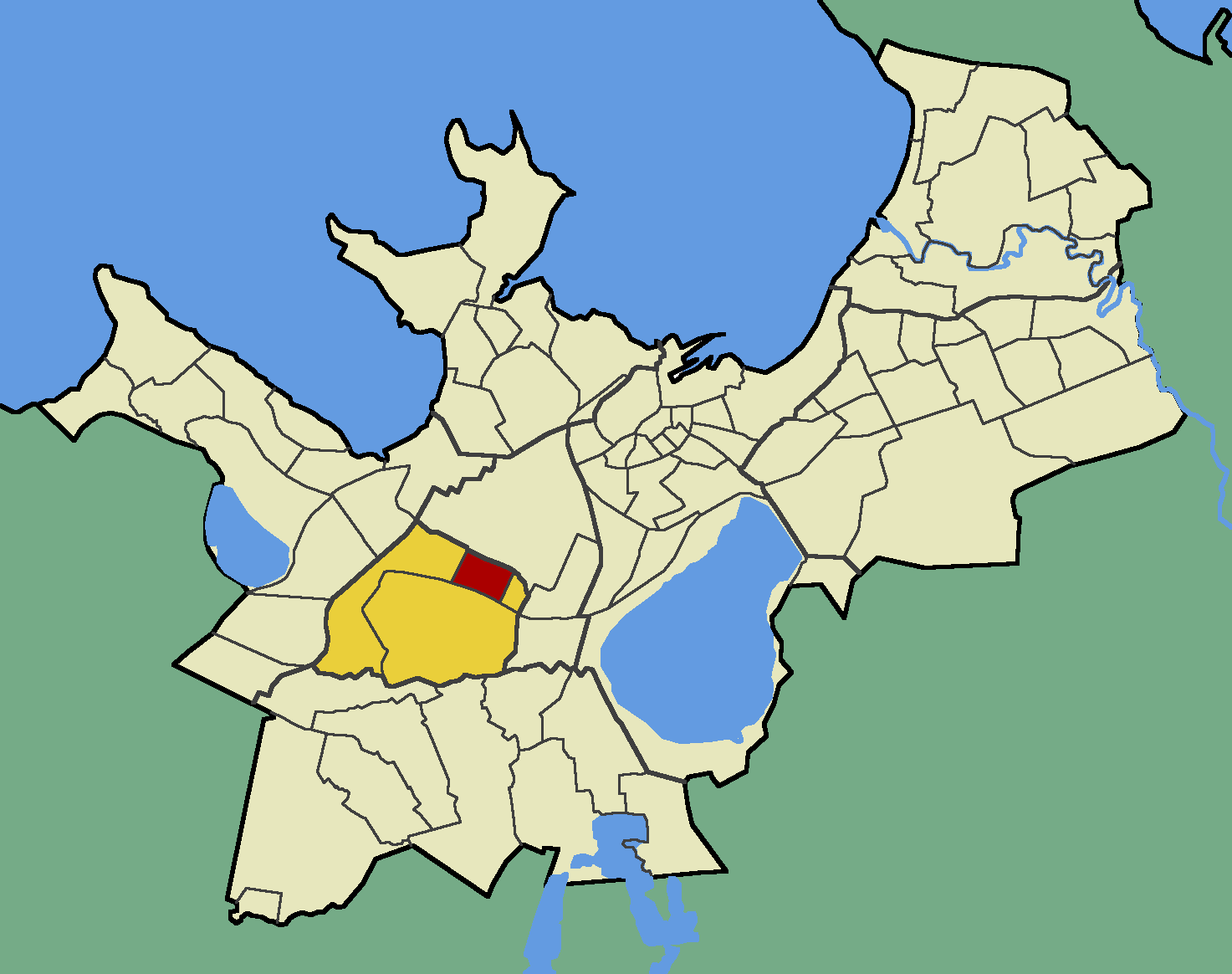
- Sääse within Mustamäe District.
- Country: Estonia
- County: Harju County
- City: Tallinn
- District: Mustamäe

Population (01.01.2014)
  - Total: 8,881

Sääse (Estonian for 'gnat') is a subdistrict (Estonian: asum) in the district of Mustamäe, Tallinn, the capital of Estonia. It has a population of 8,881 (as of 1 January 2014).

== Gallery ==
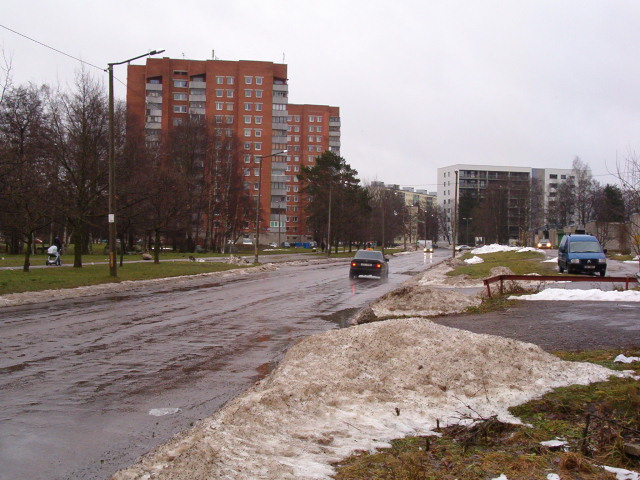

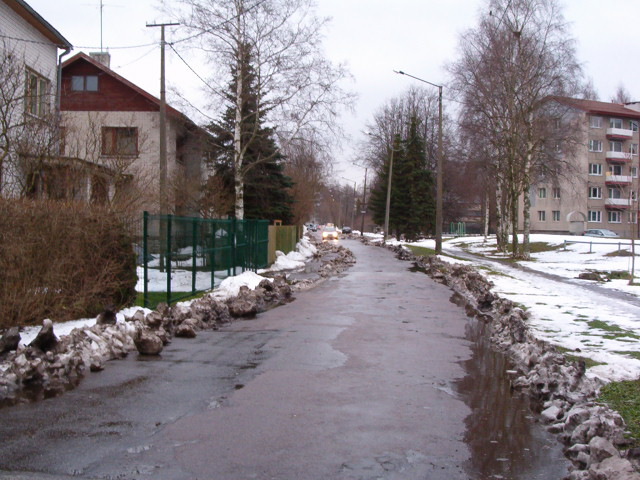

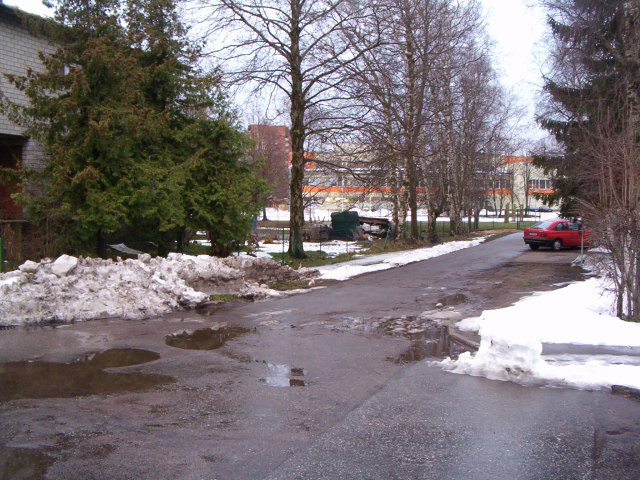
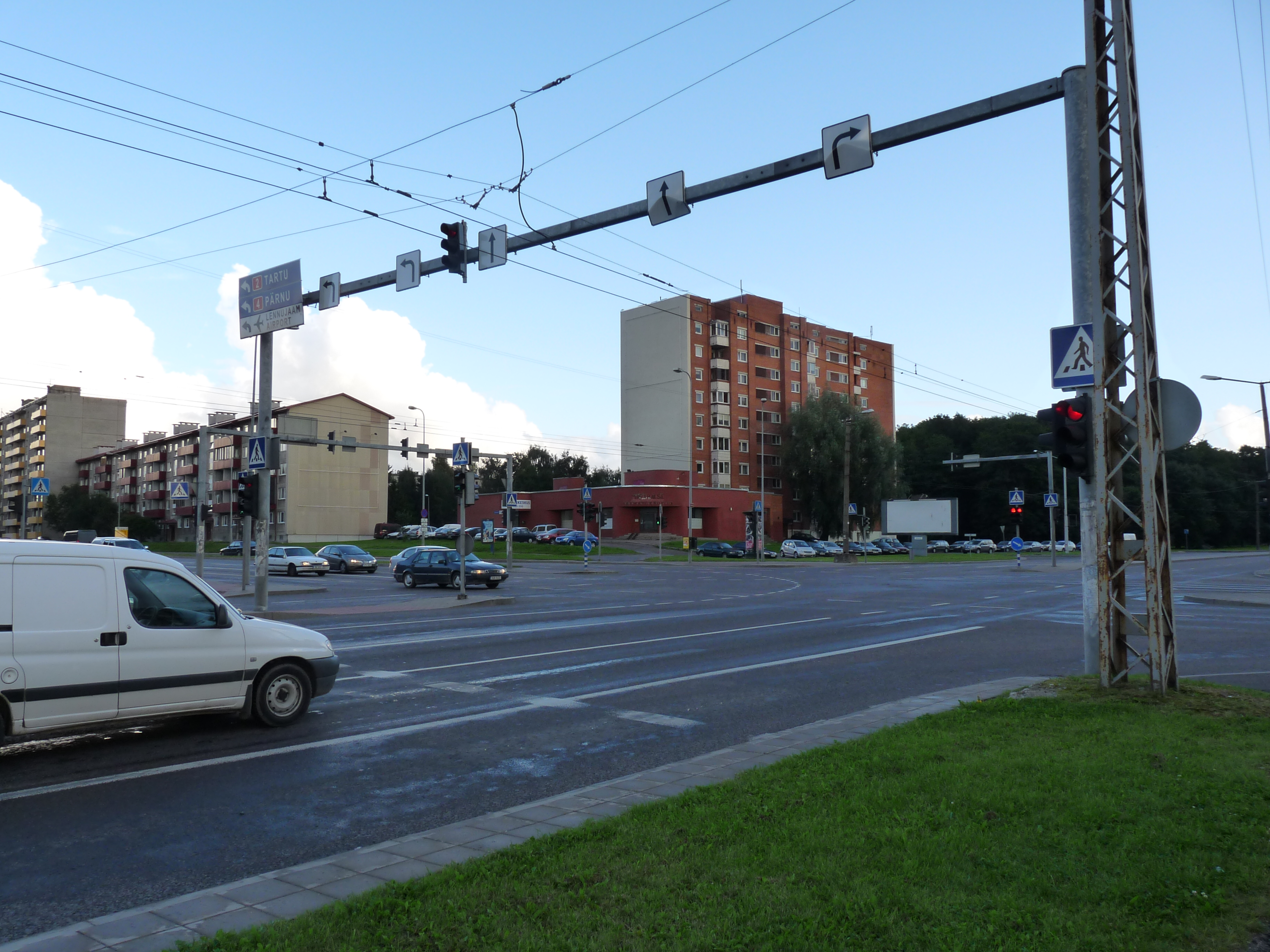

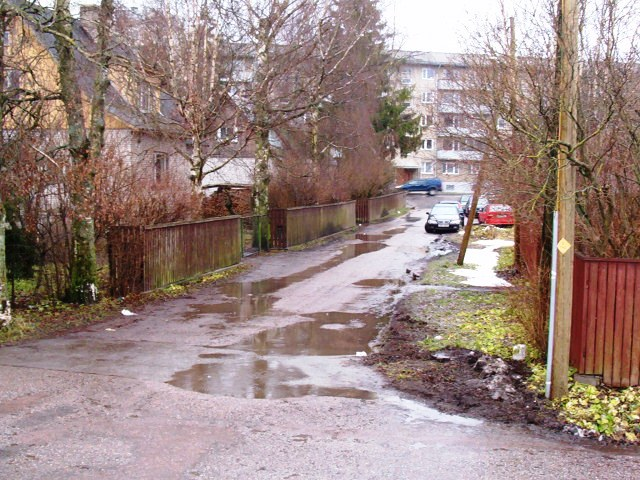

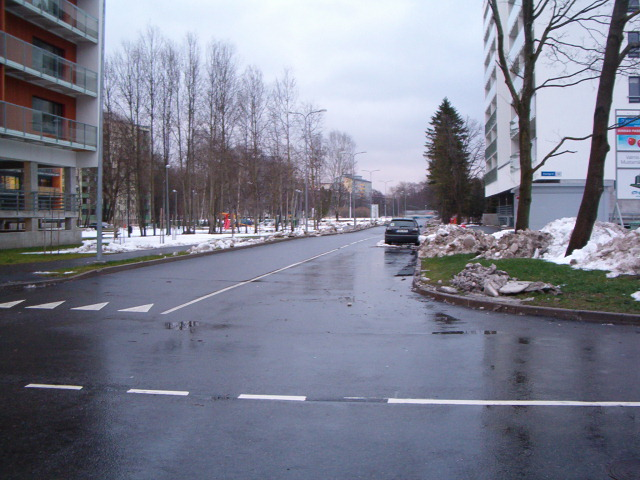
