= T1 Mall of Tallinn =

Shopping mall in Tallinn

- T1 Kaubanduskeskus
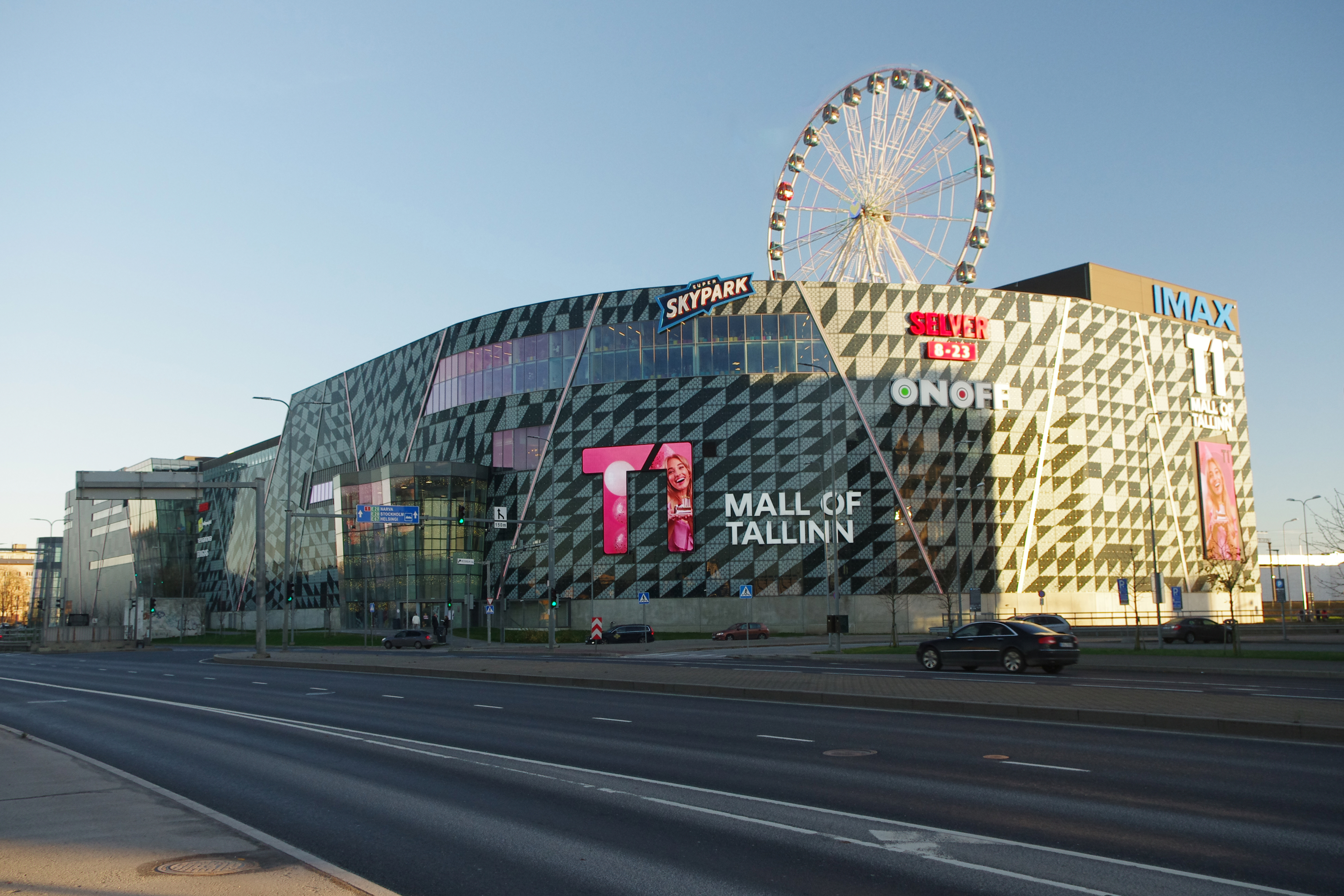
- T1 Mall of Tallinn in 2022
- Location: Tallinn, Estonia
- Coordinates: 59°25′28″N 24°47′32″E
- Address: Peterburi tee 2, 11415 Tallinn, Estonia
- Opened: 2018
- Website: t1tallinn.com

T1 Tallinn (Estonian: T1 Kaubanduskeskus, abbreviated T12018-2022 T1 Mall Of Tallinn) is a shopping mall in Tallinn, Estonia. T1 calls itself as "Estonia’s first next-generation shopping and entertainment centre".

T1 is a project of Pro Kapital Grupp. T1 was designed by Italian architect Antonio Lavieri and was built by Merko Ehitus Eesti AS. T1 was opened in 2018.

T1 has shopping area of 55,000 square metres (590,000 ft^{2}) and consists of over 200 stores. On the rooftop, there is Ferris wheel rising 120 m above sea level. This wheel is the first rooftop Ferris wheel in Europe.

AS Tallinna Moekombinaat, the owner of the shopping center, soon experienced financial difficulties, and in 2020 the company went into reorganization. On June 2, 2021, AS Tallinna Moekombinaat went bankrupt by the decision of the Harju County Court, and AS Pro Kapital Grupp lost control over the subsidiary. On June 28, 2021, the bankruptcy trustee put the T1 shopping center up for auction with a starting price of 85 million euros. There was also an attempt to sell the center at an initial price of 65 million, but a buyer was finally found on the third attempt and at an initial price of 55 million.
