= Public transport in Tallinn =

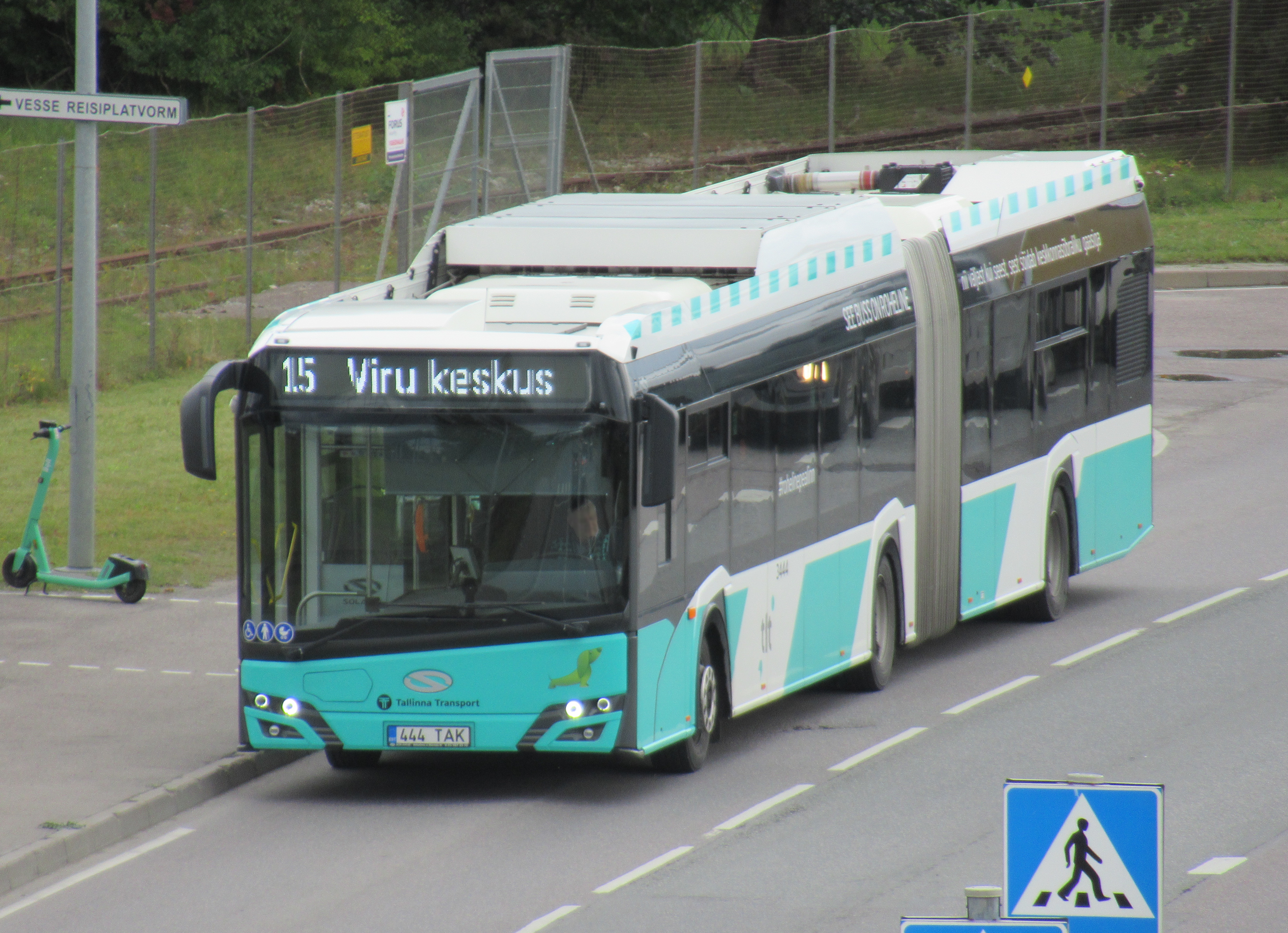
Gas-powered Solaris Urbino 18 bus in Tallinn going towards Viru Keskus

Public transport in Tallinn consists of bus, tram, trolleybus, train, and ferry services. Tallinna Linnatranspordi (TLT) operates bus, tram and trolleybus routes, Elron operates train services, and Spinnaker OÜ operates the ferry service to Aegna Island on the high speed craft Vegtind. Tallinn is the only city in Estonia to have ever used trams or trolleybuses. Use of trolleybuses has decreased since their peak operation in 1988. Since 2024, diesel buses have started to be replaced by compressed gas–powered and battery electric buses.

== History ==
The first tram route in Tallinn was opened in 1888. For their first 30 years of operation, Tallinn's trams were pulled by horses. The horse-drawn tram lines ran on the Narva, Tartu and Pärnu main roads, routes that remain in use today. The first electric trams went on the line in 1920, which were built locally in Tallinn using German and Swedish equipment. The use of trams as public transport was very popular during the period of the independent Republic of Estonia before World War II and the German and Soviet occupations. In 1939, the Tallinn tram carried more than 143 million passengers.

Regular bus connections in Tallinn began in 1921 with five bus lines. By 2024, the bus system had 67 routes.

Plans for trolleybus services began in 1946, and the first trolleybus route in Tallinn opened in 1965, during Soviet Union's occupation of Estonia. There were nine trolleybus routes at their peak, with 160 trolleybuses operating in 1988. As of 2024, there are four remaining routes, with 45 operating trolleybuses.

The first passenger trains with steam locomotives began to serve the people of Tallinn and people living near the city in the 1870s. The country's first electric train line, operating between Tallinn and Pääsküla, opened in 1924. The Second World War was devastating for passenger train traffic. The retreating Red Army stole rolling stock in 1941, and the German occupiers dismantled the electricity grids. Passenger train traffic was reopened in 1944. Narrow-gauge railway passenger train traffic in Tallinn (with one of the most important stops at the port) operated from the beginning of the 20th century until the Soviet occupation forces liquidated them.

Tallinn has been planning to construct a light rail service since 1970. The light rail project halted when Estonia regained independence from the Soviet Union's occupation, with planning resumed in the 2000s.

== Current services ==
=== Bus ===
==== Internal ====
Tallinn has 80 bus routes. Buses are available throughout Tallinn, with Pirita, Lasnamäe, Haabersti and Nõmme particularly well served. Nearly all routes have two terminus stops, one of which also serves as a resting stop for drivers. Tallinna Transpordiamet (Tallinn Department of Transportation) sets the routes and timetables, and the contracts are renewed every five years.

Route numbers in Tallinn consist of one or two numbers, occasionally accompanied by a letter. Letters A or B are usually used when multiple bus lines follow mostly the same route but have different terminuses. For example, bus routes 31 and 31A both start from the same bus terminus and follow the same route but have different end terminuses. The letter E is used for express routes. A Park & Ride bus, route 1PR, operated from September 2007 until January 2009.

The city's main bus terminal is located under the Viru Keskus shopping centre in the city centre, where 7 bus routes start (8A, 18, 20, 21, 34, 38, 44). Other major terminal stations include Väike-Õismäe, Keskuse, Seli, Baltic Station, Priisle, Kadaka, Vana-Pääsküla, Estonia Theatre and Kopli. New public transportation terminals are planned for Lilleküla between the railway station and Kristiine keskus, and in Ülemiste, between current Ülemiste railway station, T1 Mall of Tallinn and Ülemiste keskus).

Tallinn has very few "feeder lines" that connect bus passengers to other means of transport. Bus route 25 used to take passengers to the two trolleybus terminuses in Mustamäe but the route was closed in September 2020. Bus route 22 takes passengers to Väike-Õismäe, which used to be a trolleybus terminus, but now connects with another bus route.

Routes mostly operate between 5:20 am and 12:20 am. Some bus routes, mainly express routes, operate only during peak hours and have breaks between 10:00 am and 2:00 pm. Since September 2012, express routes have the same ticket price as regular bus routes.

The scheduled bus intervals depend on route and time of day. Most routes to the high-density districts of Lasnamäe, Väike-Õismäe, Mustamäe, and Pelguranna (all built during the Soviet occupation) have typical intervals of 6–15 minutes, while typical scheduled bus intervals to the low-density districts of Nõmme and Pirita are 12–60 minutes. Some routes operate only on weekdays and only during rush hours.

In late 2008, popular bus and trolleybus routes' operating times were prolonged until 1 am but this did not continue. Four night bus lines began operating in 2023. These lines are operate between Balti jaam to Mustamäe, Väike-Õismäe, Pelguranna, and Priisle. Two more night bus lines were added in 2024. These lines are Balti jaam to Viimsi keskus and Balti jaam to Vana-Pääsküla. The use of night bus lines is free of charge for Tallinn residents. The services run every half hour until 4.30 am on Saturday and Sunday night. Discussions are underway whether to offer the service on Thursdays and Fridays as well. The most popular night bus lines are the Mustamäe, Priisle and Vana-Pääsküla lines.

The Tallinn Department of Transportation currently owns 530 buses. It bought 100 new environmentally-friendly Solaris Urbino 12 CNG and Solaris Urbino 18 CNG compressed gas buses from Solaris Bus & Coach, which entered into service in August 2020. Tallinn has since bought a further 250 compressed gas buses, making 350 in total, and plans to replace all older diesel buses by 2025. Only the newest Euro 6 emission standard-compliant diesel buses will remain in use alongside the gas buses, specifically the MAN Lion's City A78, MAN Lion's City GL / A40, and Volvo 7900 Hybrid.

15 electric buses Solaris Urbino 12 electric were added to the bus fleet with an option for another 15 in 2024. These buses were considered suitable for the Nordic climate of Tallinn, as they had already been used in other Northern European countries such as Finland, Latvia, Sweden and Norway. TLT plans for buses to be fully electric by 2035. Tallinn city government approved an additional budget in 2024, according to which Tallinn will purchase another 30 compressed gas buses for 12 million euros.

Number	Route
1	Vana-Pääsküla - Viru - Viimsi
2	Balti jaam - Mõigu
3	Vana-Lõuna - Pelguranna
4	Väike-Õismäe - Tiskre
5	Männiku - Viru - Metsakooli tee
6	Merivälja pansion - Metsakooli tee
7	Seli - Sõjamäe
8	Väike-Õismäe - Balti jaam - Äigrumäe
8A	Viru keskus - Äigrumäe
9E	Kadaka - Estonia - Priisle
10	Väike-Õismäe - Nõmme - Vana-Pääsküla
11E	Kadaka - Kaubamaja
12	Väike-Õismäe - Seli
13	Väike-Õismäe - Priisle
15	Estonia - Bussijaam - Radarikeskus
16	Väike-Õismäe - Estonia - Tallinn-Väike
18	Viru keskus - Urda
19	Reisisadama D-terminal - Laagri alevik
20	Viru keskus - Teelise
21	Viru keskus - Landi
22	Väike-Õismäe - Kakumäe
23	Kadaka - Bussijaam
24	Kadaka - Estonia
24A	Kadaka - Mäepealse - Estonia
25	Tiskre - Reisisadama D-Terminal
26	Väike-Õismäe - Paljassaare
26A	Väike-Õismäe - Paljassaare põik
27	Harkujärve - Laagri alevik
28	Vana-Lõuna - Väike-Õismäe
30	Seli - Iru - Kärmu
31	Priisle - Estonia
31A	Priisle – Iru hooldekodu – Estonia
32	Männiku - Kopli
33	Männiku - Kopli
34	Viru keskus - Muuga aedlinn
35	Seli - Pelguranna
36	Väike-Õismäe - Nõmme - Viru
37	Mustamäe - Kakumäe sadam
38	Viru keskus - Muuga
39	Vana-Lõuna - Liikuri
40	Priisle - Estonia - Pelguranna
41	Balti jaam - Kakumäe
42	Väike-Õismäe - Estonia - Priisle
44	Viru keskus - P. Pinna
45	Väike-Õismäe - Nõmme - Ülemiste
46	Väike-Õismäe - Estonia - Seli
47	Lennujaam - Peetri kool
48	Pirita Keskus - Vesse
49	Viimsi keskus - Lennujaam
50	Seli - Majaka põik
54	Väike-Õismäe - Bussijaam - Priisle
55	Hobujaama - P. Pinna
57	Raudalu - Kalev
58	Priisle - Majaka põik
59	Balti jaam - Pikakari
60	Seli - Maneeži
61	Kotermaa - Järve haigla
62	Väike-Õismäe - Mäeküla
63	Priisle - Maneeži
65	Priisle – Lennujaam
66	Priisle - Balti jaam - Pelguranna
67	Seli - Bussijaam - Sütiste
73	Vana-Lõuna - Viru - Kopli liinid

Number	Night Bus Route
91	Balti jaam - Mustamäe
92	Balti jaam - Väike-Õismäe
93	Balti jaam - Pelguranna
94	Balti jaam - Priisle
95	Balti jaam - Viimsi keskus
96	Balti jaam - Vana-Pääsküla

==== Regional ====
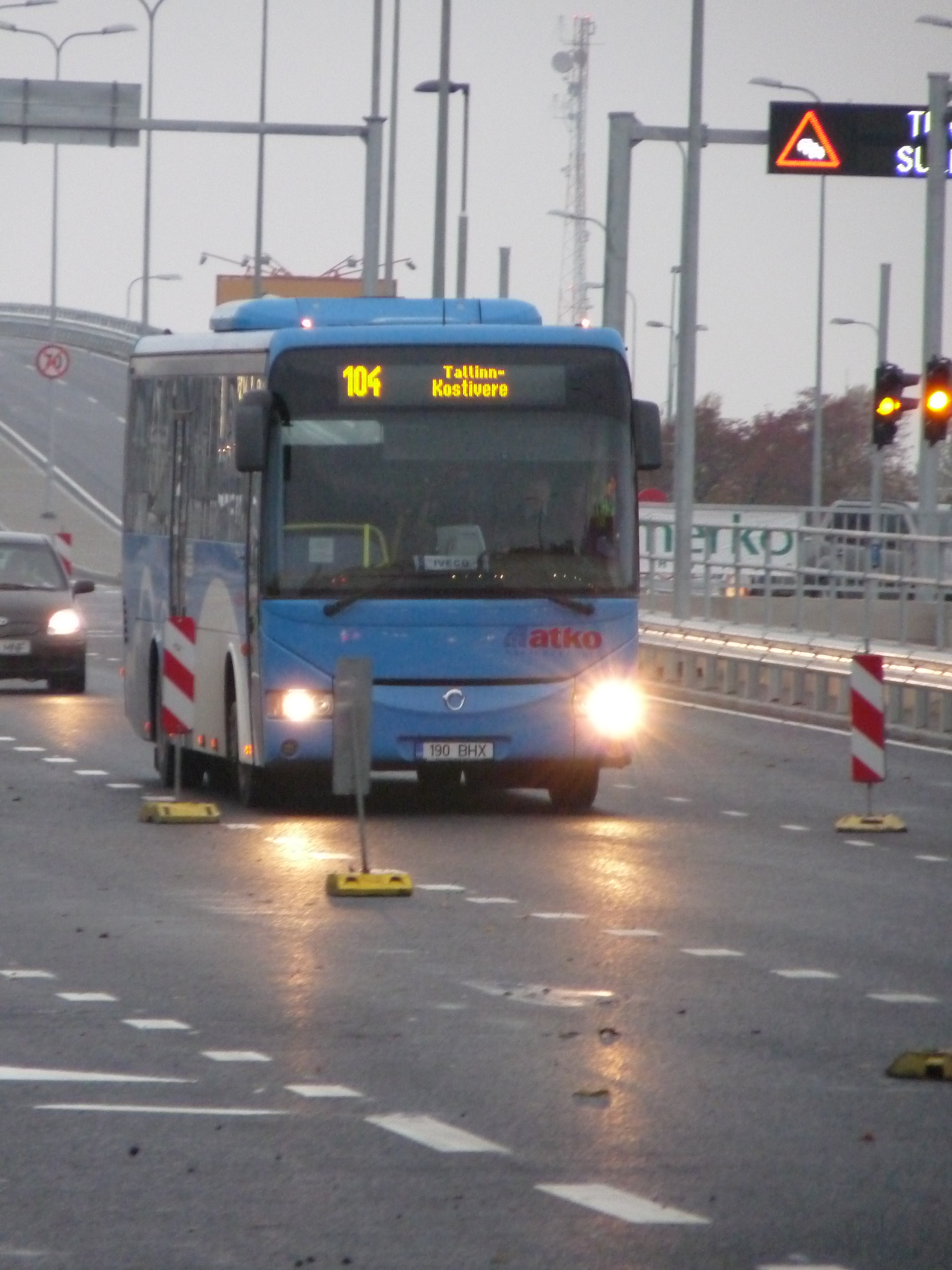
Suburban bus on line 104 from Tallinn to Kostivere

Regional bus routes are managed by the Harjumaa Ühistranspordikeskus (HÜTK) (Harju County Public Transportation Centre). The centre was established in early 2005 by 25 local governments of Harjumaa and the Government of the Harju County as the representative of the Republic of Estonia. The goal of the centre is to arrange public transportation in Harju County to raise the quality of the service provided. There are about 50 commercial lines in Harju County.

=== Tram ===
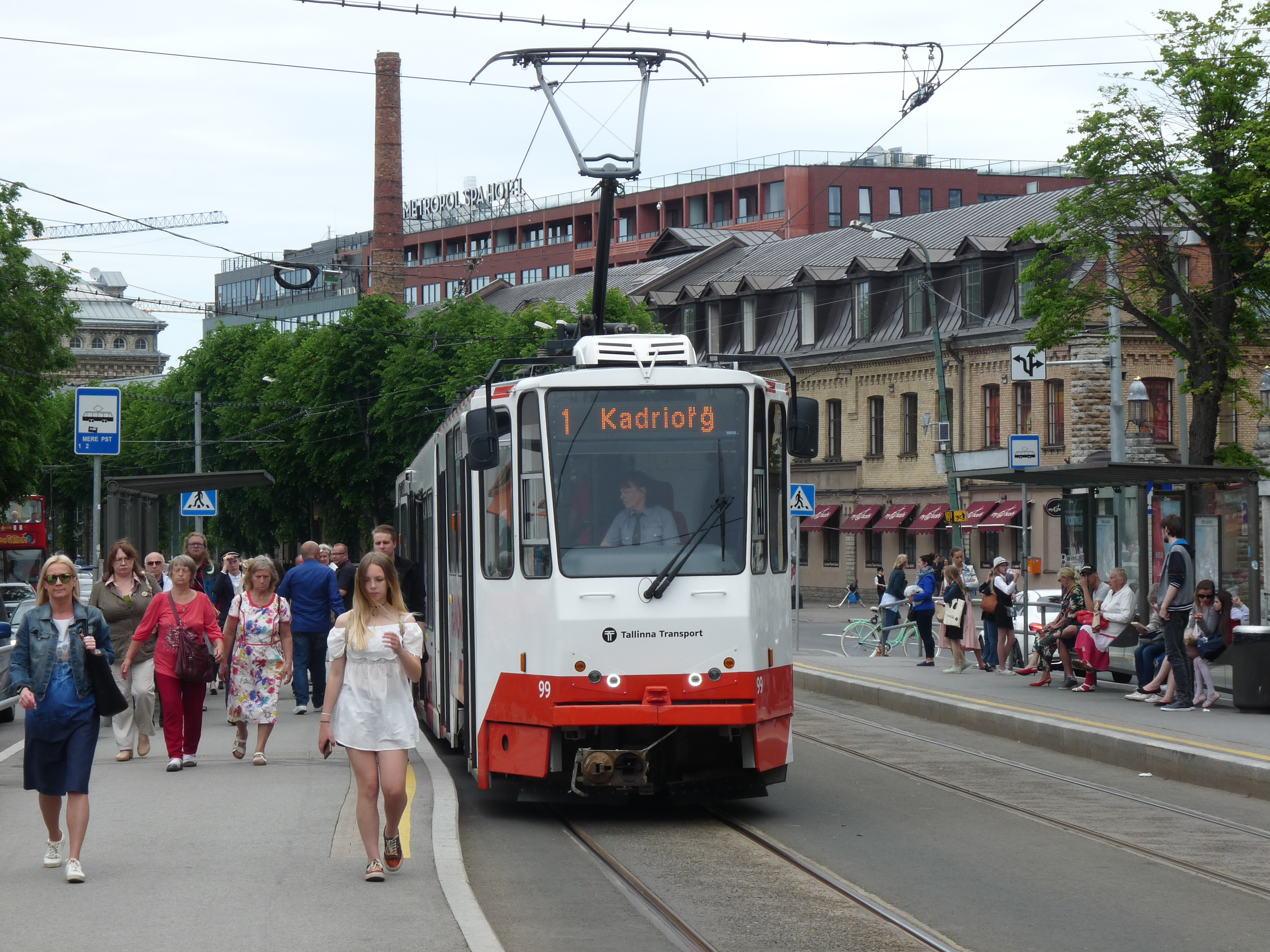
A modernized Tatra KTNF6-type tram with a lowered middle-section in Tallinn

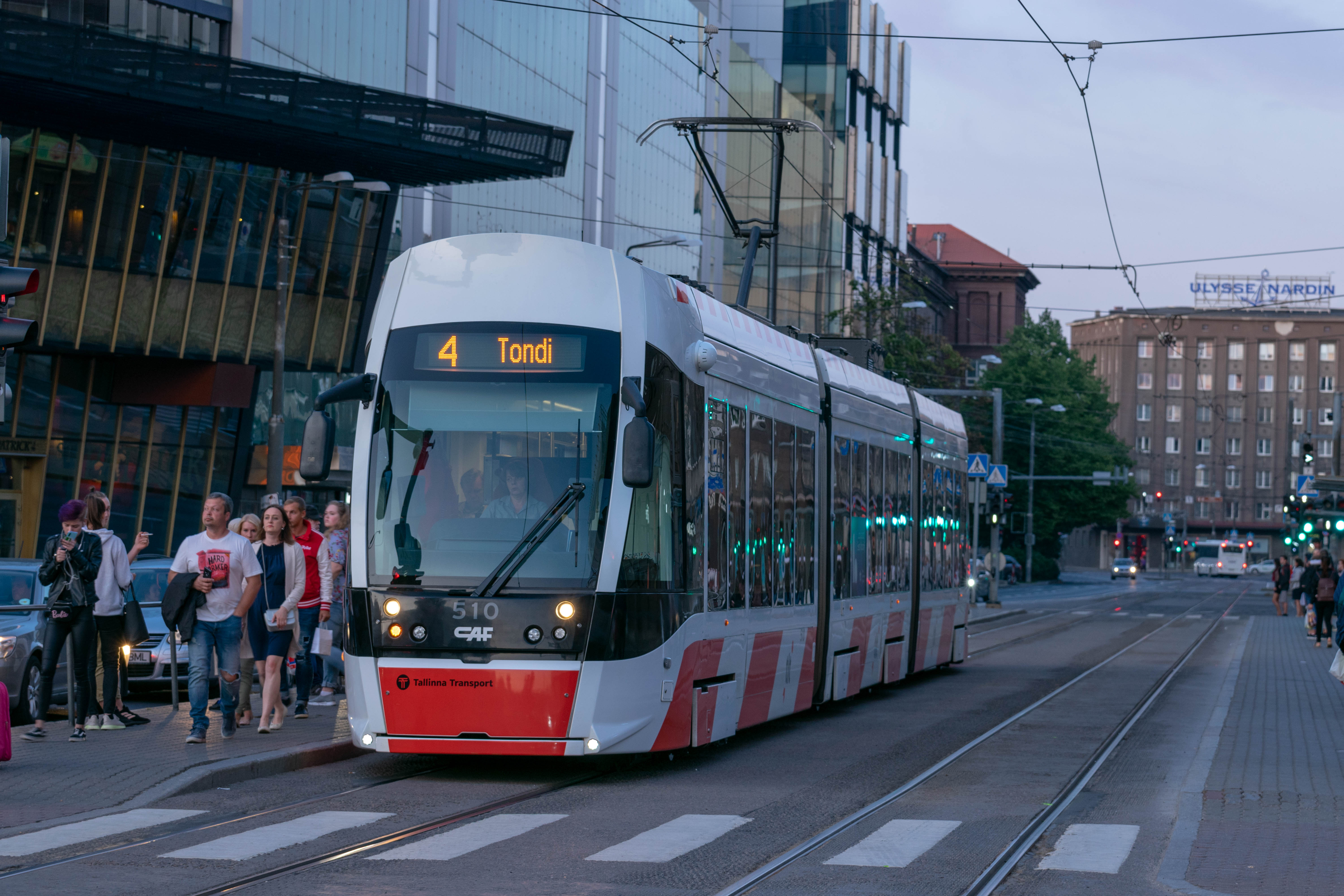
CAF Urbos is one of the seven tram types of Tallinn

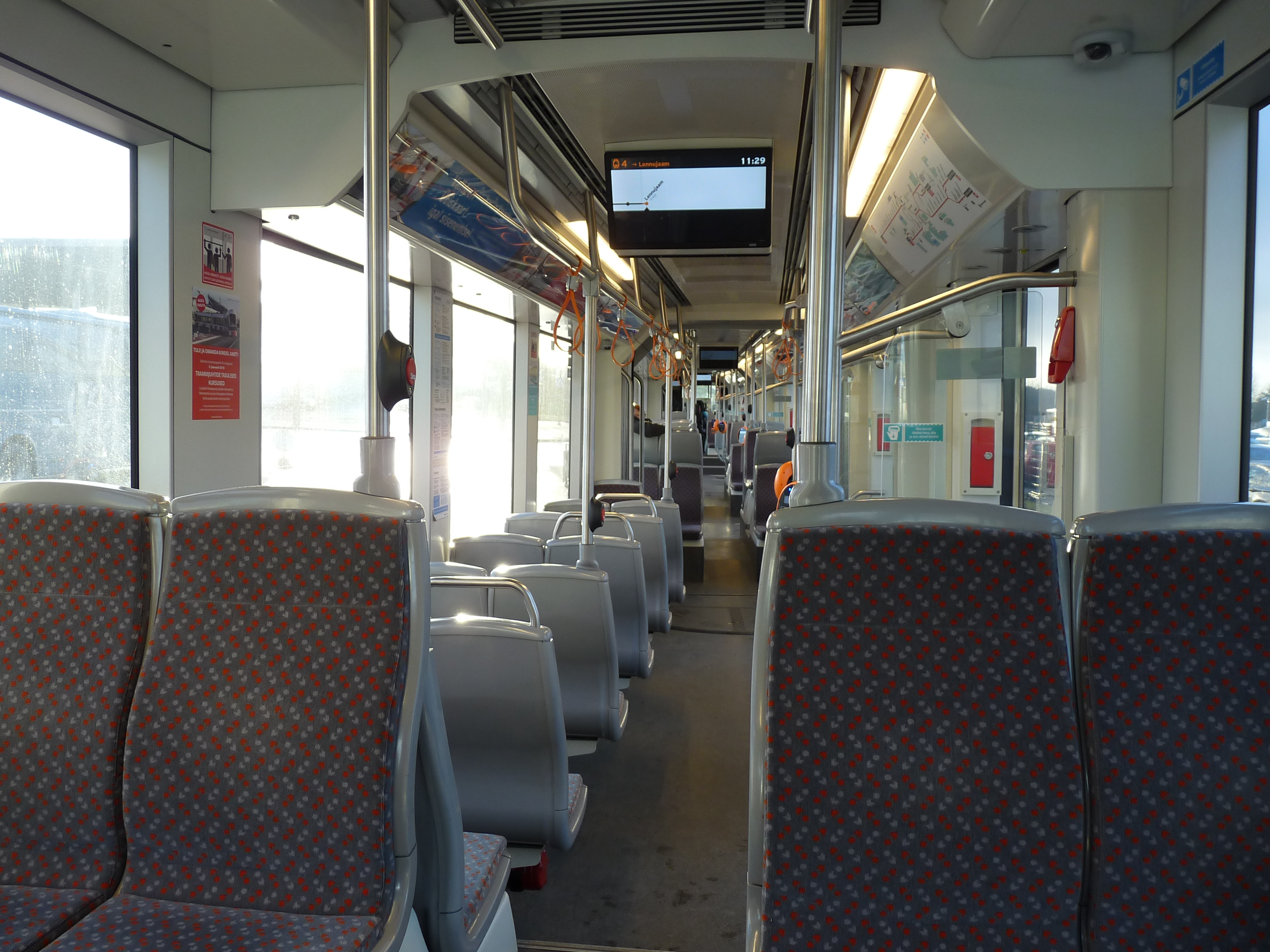
The interior of a CAF Urbos tram in Tallinn.

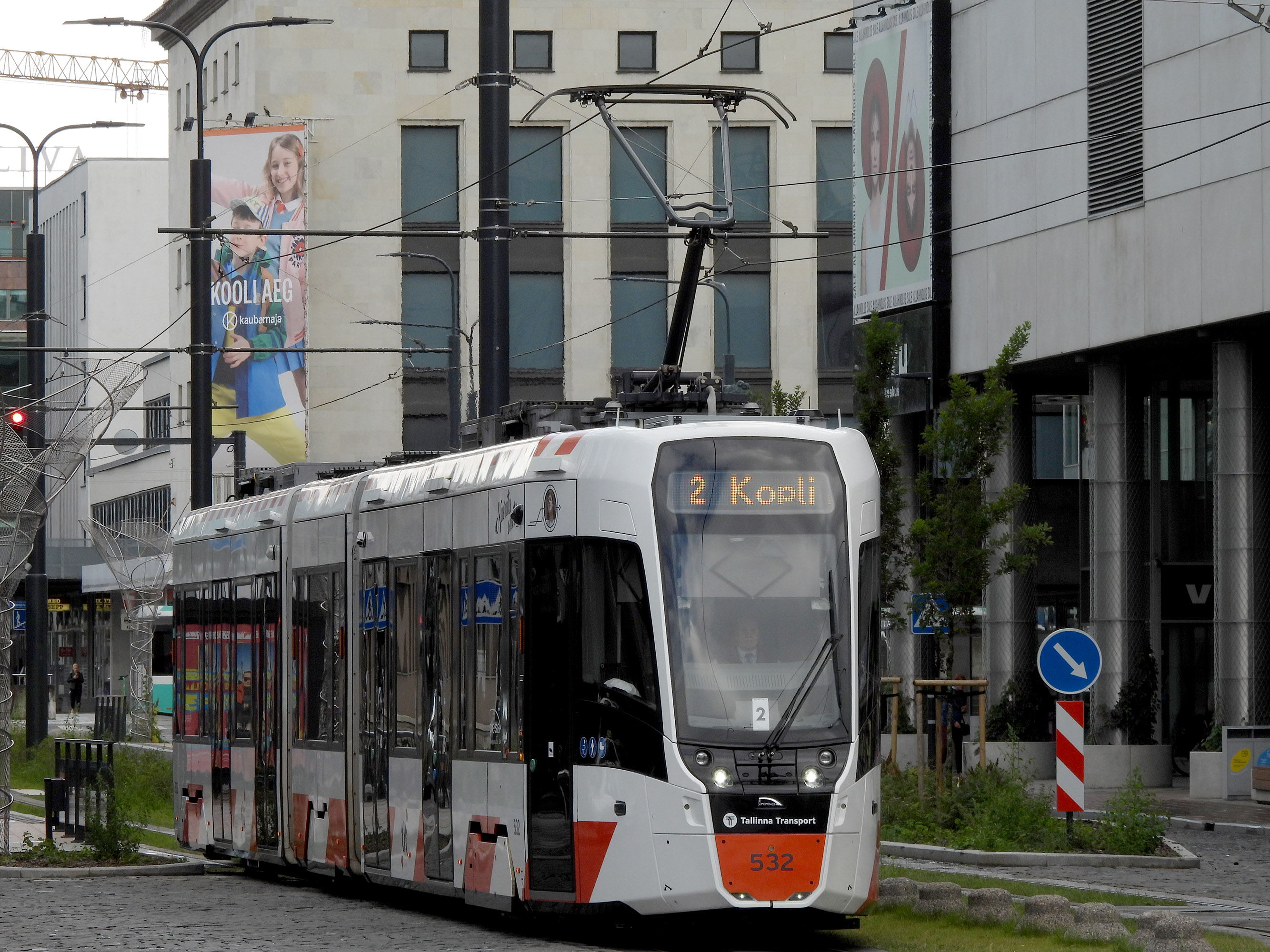
Pesa Twist trams in Tallinn

The tram system is operated by TLT. Tallinn's tram network is 19.7 kilometres (12.2 mi) long, and serves mainly the city centre and its surrounding areas. There are 5 tram lines and seven types of trams: Tatra KT4D (German model), Tatra KT4SU (Soviet Union model), Tatra KT4TM (modernized Tatra KT4s), Tatra KT4TMR (built from Tatra KT4 bodies to look like retro vehicles), Tatra KT6TM (which is like Tatra KT4 with a lowered middle-section, also modernized), CAF Urbos AXL and PESA Twist 147N. Twenty CAF Urbos AXL trams entered service in 2015/16. Twenty three PESA Twist trams entered service in 2024/2025. Of the 66 trams in Tallinn, 45 are in daily use during rush hour.

A line 4 extension to Tallinn Airport was opened on 1 September 2017, consisting of two new stops: Ülemiste linnak and Lennujaam (Airport). A tunnel was built to bypass the train tracks by Ülemiste jaam. Six old Tatra KT4 trams were fully renovated in 2016–2017 to imitate the look of early 20th century trams, all of which operated on line 3 and after depot reassignment on line 1 and 5. 12 old Tatra KT6s and 2 KT4s were fully modernized in 2017–2018. This means that new or fully modernized trams make up about 95% of all trams in Tallinn.

International procurement for purchasing 8 new trams to Tallinn was started in late 2019, with an option to buy 15 more. In 2022, the Polish company Pojazdy Szynowe PESA Bydgoszcz (PESA) won the contract to supply up to 23 new trams to TLT for 52 million euros. The first new trams were delivered in 2024. The tram model offered by PESA is PESA Twist, which is adapted to the gauge of Tallinn. The 28.6-metre (93 ft 10 in)-long, six-door trams have 65 seats and can accommodate a total of 300 passengers. In addition to PESA, two other companies took part in the procurement but were unsuccessful: the Spanish company Construcciones y Auxiliar de Ferrocarriles (CAF) and the joint Finnish-Czech tenderers Škoda Transtech and Škoda Transportation. According to the plans, the new trams will primarily serve the new Vanasadama (Old Town Harbour) line.

Tallinn city government approved an additional budget in 2024 to purchase another 10 new trams for 35 million euros. These trams should arrive by 2027 to cover the needs of the additional line network capacity in the direction of Pelguranna and Liivalaia. The winner of this tender has not yet been announced.

TLT began selling its old KT4 trams in 2024, and it plans to sell all un-modernized trams. By 2028, Tallinn should have a total of 73 trams, of which 53 will be modern trams and 20 will be modernized trams.

Number	Route	Additional information
T1	Kopli — Kadriorg	All departures with only low-floor rolling stock at weekends and holidays.
T2	Kopli – Vanasadam – Lennujaam (airport)	All departures with low-floor rolling stock every day.
T3	Tondi — Kadriorg	All departures with low-floor rolling stock every day.
T4	Tondi — Lennujaam (airport)	All departures with low-floor rolling stock every day.
T5	Kopli – Vana-Lõuna	All departures with only low-floor rolling stock at weekends and holidays.
T6	Kopli – Hobujaama – Suur-Paala	Started service from 1 September 2026. All departures with low-floor rolling stock every day.
T7	Kopli – Lennujaam (Airport) CLOSED (a temporary route used on special occasions and in case of line closures)	

=== Trolleybus ===
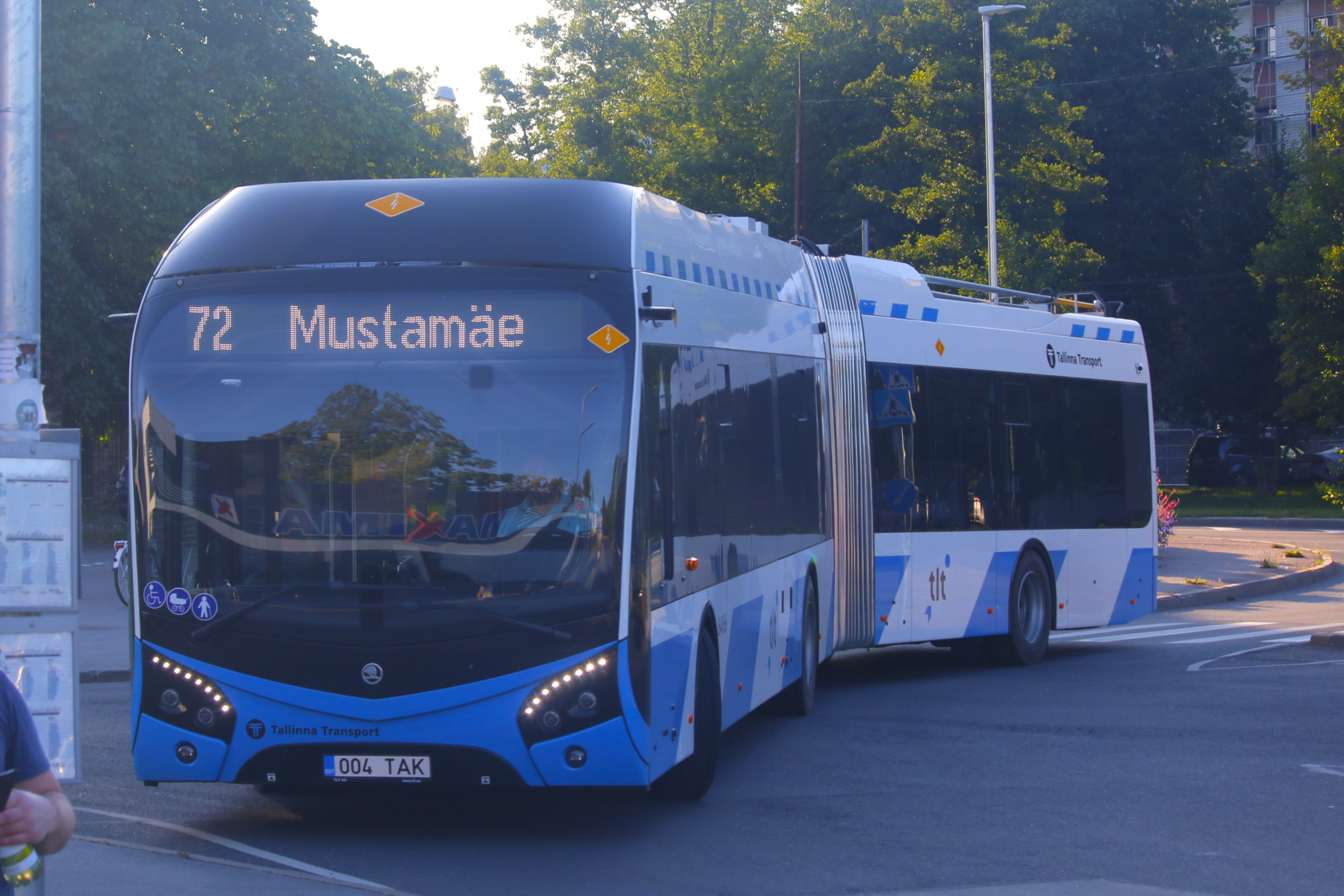
Trolleybus line no. 72

TLT AS operates with 40 trolleybuses. It operates Škoda 32Tr SOR and Škoda 33Tr SOR trolleybuses, made by cooperation of Škoda Transportation and SOR. Trolleybuses serve the western part of Tallinn, mainly in the Mustamäe district. Trolleybus lines are typically scheduled with 8- to 15-minute intervals between vehicles.

Trolleybus services began in 1965 with a route from the Estonian National Opera "Estonia" to Hipodroom (Hippodrome). Since 2000, several trolleybus lines have been replaced with buses. As of 2026 there are three remaining trolleybus routes: 84 and 85 from the city centre (Baltic Station) to Mustamäe and two routes from the city centre (Kaubamaja) to Mustamäe and 72 from Mustamäe to Kopli.

In 2024, Tallinn city government approved an additional to purchase 40 new trolleybuses with off-wire capability for 29 million euros. This will replace the entire existing trolleybus fleet. The winner of the tender has not yet been announced. The removal of older trolleybuses from the lines will begin in 2024. The new trolleybuses were shown publicly on 26 April 2026 with operations commencing on 1 June.

From 1 July 2026, the trolleybuses have resumed to Tallinn starting with two lines, nr 84 and nr 85. Three more routes reopened in 1 August 2026 starting with three more lines: 72, 81 and 83.

Number	Route
72	Mustamäe – Kopli via Sõpruse puiestee
81	Mustamäe – Kaubamaja (Central Department Store) via Mustamäe tee
83	Mustamäe – Kaubamaja (Central Department Store) via Sõpruse puiestee
84	Keskuse — Balti jaam (Baltic Station) via Sõpruse puiestee
85	Mustamäe – Balti jaam (Baltic Station) via Mustamäe tee

=== Commuter Train ===
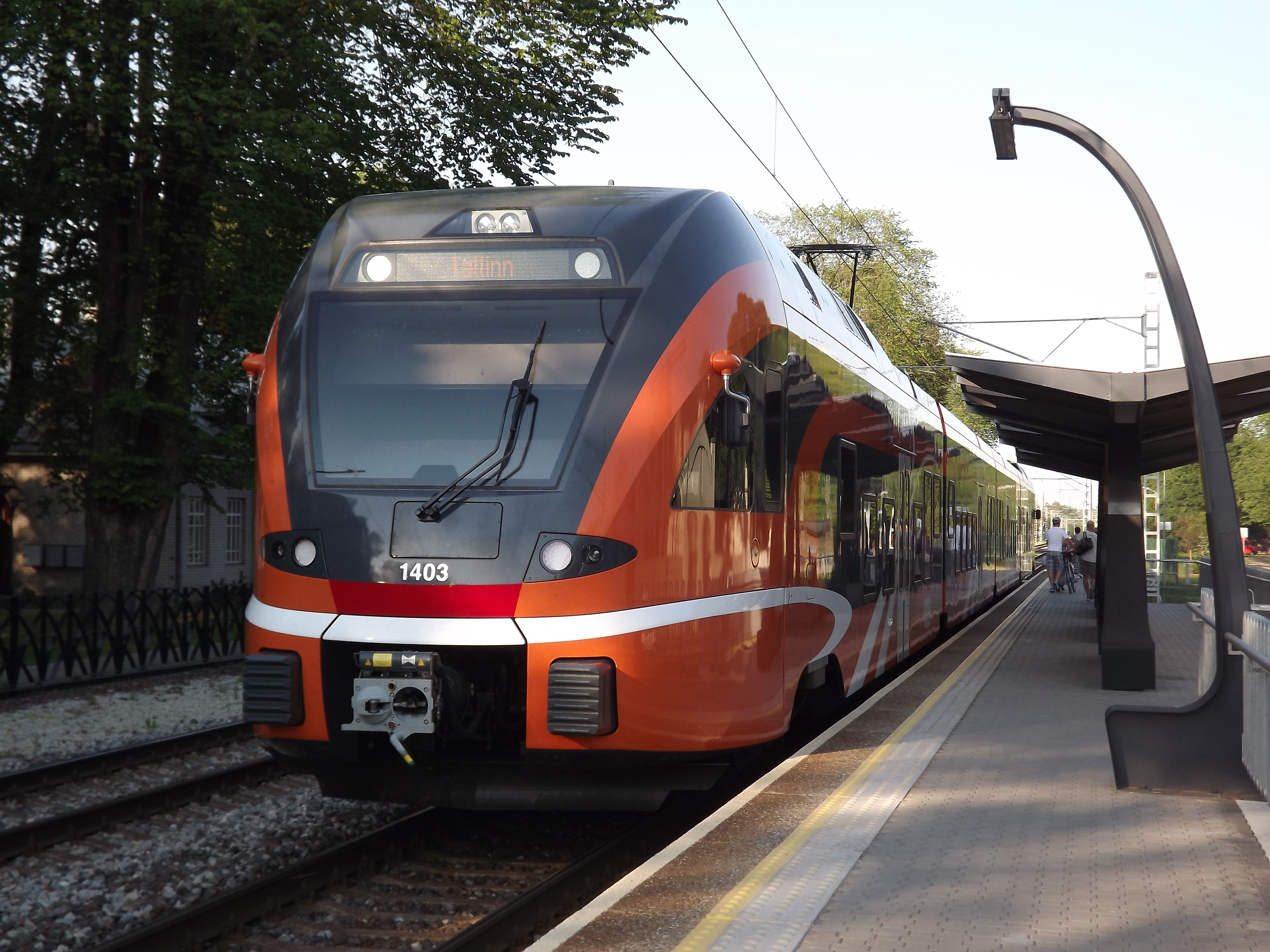
Stadler Flirt EMU at Nõmme station. Elron manages the suburban train connections in Tallinn and Greater Tallinn Area

Elron commuter trains serve the Greater Tallinn Area in Harju County and travel through the Kristiine, Nõmme and Lasnamäe districts of the city. They are used mostly by residents of Harju County and Nõmme district, the southernmost district of Tallinn. The trains terminate at Tallinn Baltic Station in the Kesklinn district, close to the Põhja-Tallinn district. Railway transport is free for registered city residents within the city borders (1st zone). Trains on westbound lines in Tallinn are typically scheduled with 10- to 20-minute intervals at rush hour (6 am to 8:30 am and 3:30 pm to 6:30 pm), and at 20 minute intervals at other times. While eastbound and southwestbound lines have irregular service. Trains are in service typically from 5:15 am to 11:45 pm, depending on the direction and line. Nõmme district has installed bicycle parking in every railway station in the district to encourage commuter train use by its residents. Currently there are no appropriate feeder bus routes for the commuter train in Nõmme district.

Elron has operated Stadler Flirt EMU and DMU trains since 2013. New Škoda 21Evelectric commuter trains started operating from 15 December 2025 on the Tallinn–Kloogaranna line and from 5 January 2026 on the Tallinn–Tapa line. The arrival of new trains between 2024 and 2026 will gradually solve the shortage of rolling stock and allow more frequent services on all routes, as Stadler Flirt EMUs will be allocated to Western line and some Stadler Flirt DMUs to South-Western line.

As of January 2026, the following commuter train routes operate from Tallinn Baltic Station:

Number	Route	Electrified
R11	Tallinn — Pääsküla	yes
R12	Tallinn — Keila	yes
R13	Tallinn – Kloogaranna	yes
R14	Tallinn — Paldiski	yes
R15	Tallinn — Paldiski (via Laoküla station)	yes
R16	Tallinn – Turba	yes
R17	Tallinn – Turba (via Jaanika station)	yes
R21	Tallinn – Rapla	no
R22	Tallinn – Türi	no
R30	Tallinn – Tapa	yes
R31	Tallinn – Aegviidu	yes
RE12	Tallinn – Keila (high-speed train)	yes
RE14	Tallinn – Paldiski (high-speed train)	yes
RE16	Turba – Tallinn (high-speed train)	yes

Almost all commuter trains, except for the trains R21, R22, R30 and R31, run in the western direction (towards Paldiski/Turba). Trains R21 and R22 go beyond Harju County to Rapla County and Järva County, respectively. They also serve residents of Tallinn and the Harju County.

=== Ferry ===
Tallinn has a ferry connection to Aegna island. Since Aegna doesn't have many residents, the ferry is mostly used by tourists and is operated only in the summertime, usually from May to October. The route is operated by Spinnaker OÜ with the high-speed craft Vegtind. The journey from Patarei harbor to Aegna takes 30 minutes. City residents can use the ferry for free.

== Tickets ==
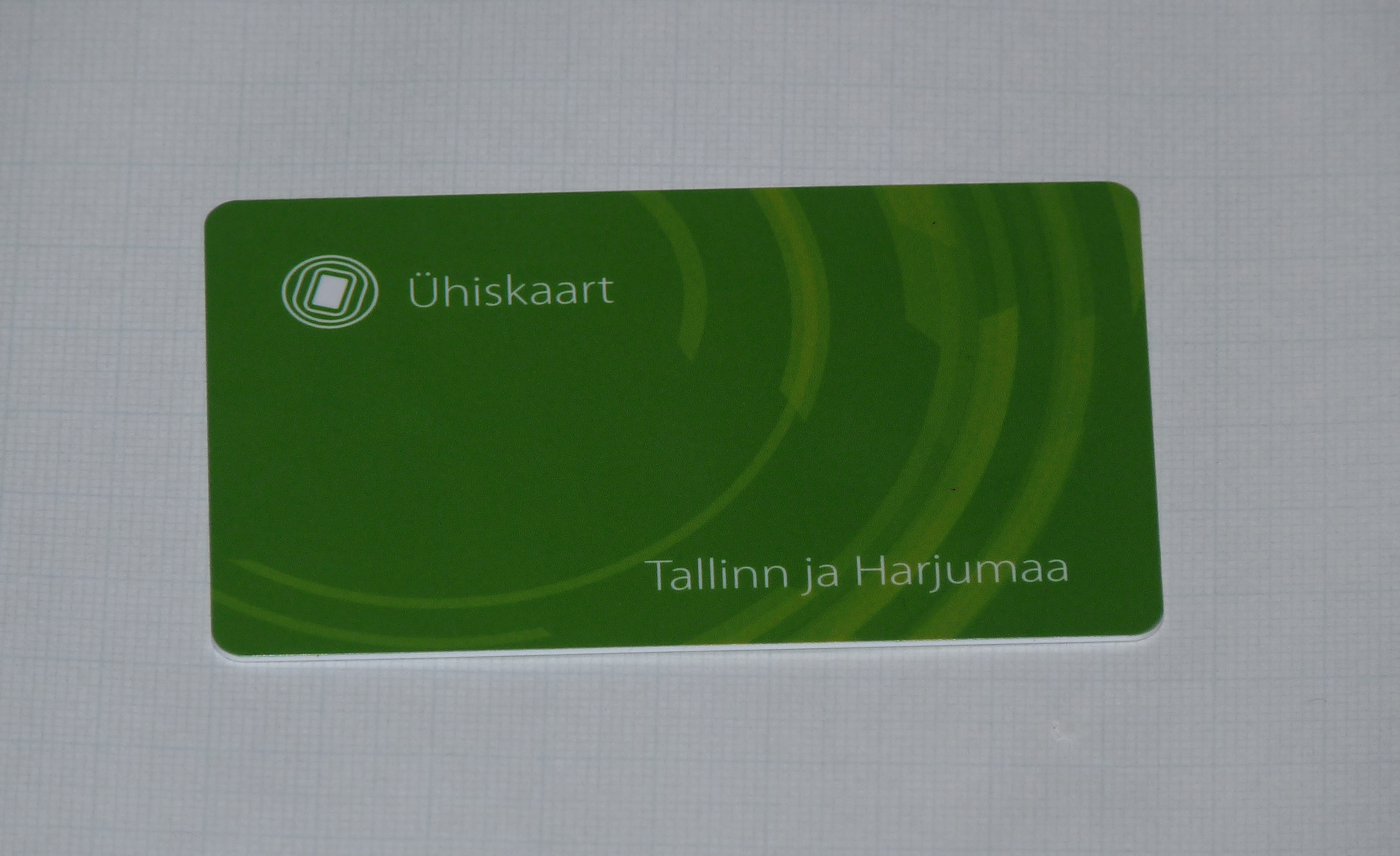
The Public Transport Card (Ühiskaart)

Tallinn buses, trams and trolleybuses use a unified ticket system. Harju County routes and commuter trains (Elron) have a different fare system, which depends on the distance traveled. Preparations are underway for a more uniform ticket system throughout Harju County.

In a public opinion poll on 25 March 2012, over 75% of the participants voted for fare-free transit on Tallinn's public transport system. Public transport has been fare-free for Tallinn residents since 1 January 2013, making Tallinn the first European capital abolishing fares for city residents. Later, Elron and Tallinn city council reached an agreement so that urban routes (1st zone) of commuter trains have free for city residents since January 2013. Free travel is also available for anyone under the age of 7, passengers with children under 3 years of age, and residents of Estonia aged 65 or over. Fares continue to be charged to other non-residents of the city (including tourists and visitors).

Non-residents can use the travel card (Ühiskaart) to load cash for single tickets, different period tickets, and other special tickets. Discount tickets are eligible to use for students, pensioners and disabled people. Public transport vehicles can generally be entered from all doors, and tickets (Ühiskaart) should be validated immediately upon entry.

The front validators on buses, trolley buses and trams support contactless and QR-code-based methods of validation. One-hour tickets can be bought with contactless bank card from the ticket/validation machine. Day tickets are also available. The system tracks passengers' usage and charges their bank account for the cheapest ticket they are entitled to, either one-hour tickets or a whole-day ticket. Buying a ticket with cash was discontinued in buses, trams and trolleybuses in 2020. Card and cash payments are available on commuter trains. Commuters who have Elron's Transport card can load money to the card to purchase a ticket from the ticket machine located in all train entrances.

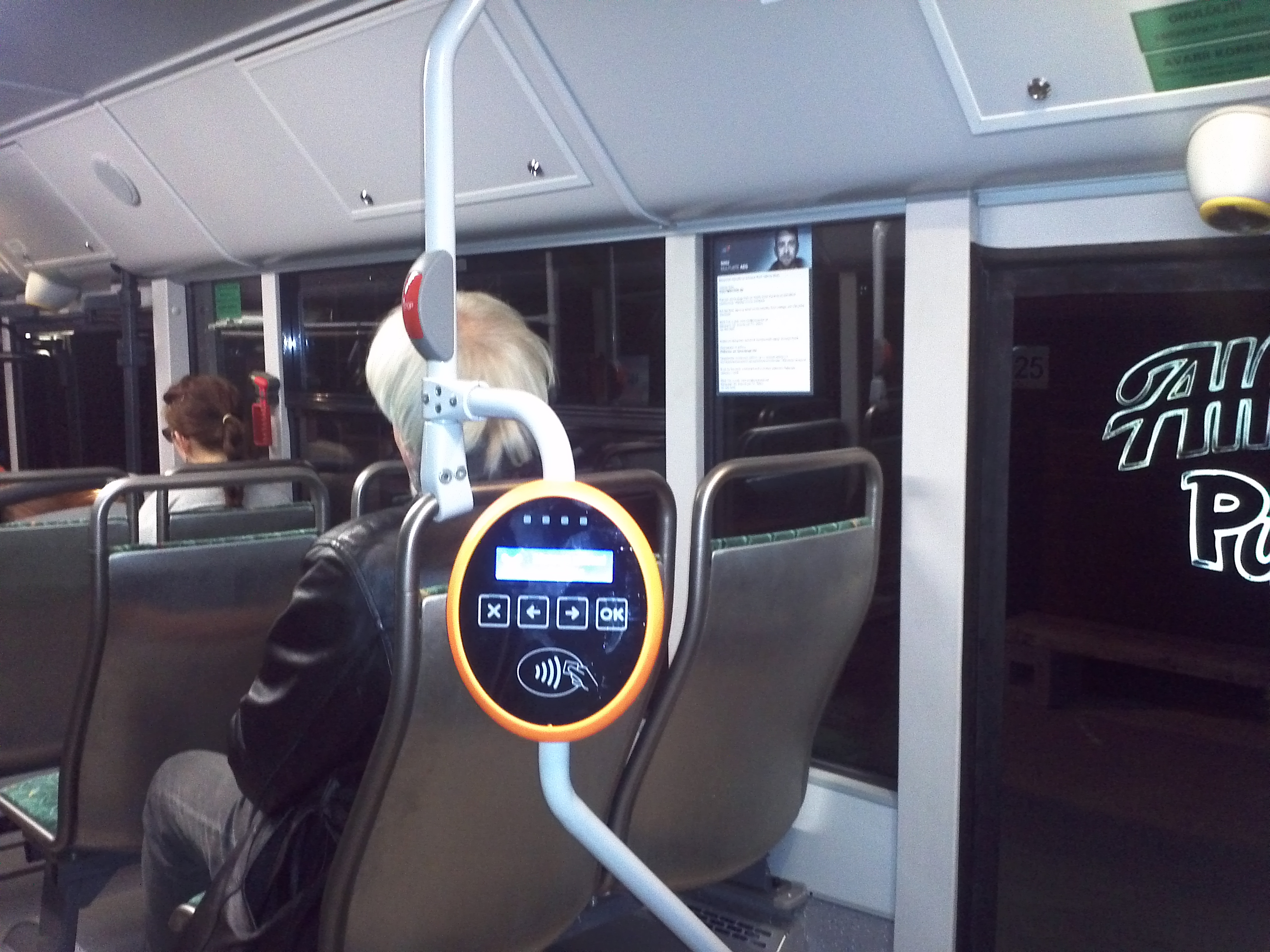
The Public Transport Card validator

Most public transport vehicles in Tallinn operate on a proof-of-payment system. As of July 2008, Tallinn Municipal Police fare inspectors randomly check tickets, stopping vehicles between stops so no one can leave the vehicle unnoticed. A fine (maximum of €40) is charged to any passenger without a valid ticket. If a passenger has forgotten their ID-card, they can tell the ticket controller their social security number to prove their right to travel. Since 1 January 2013, fare-free travelers (except those who could travel for before) have to validate their Public Transport Card (Ühiskaart); if they fail to do validation methods or show their ID card, they can be fined €40.

== Future plans ==
=== Bus ===
TLT has announced that by 2025 there will be no diesel buses operating in Tallinn public transportation. According to Tallinn Development Plan 2035, all public transportation will be powered by electricity by 2035. Future plans include more express bus routes and new tram lines that are fed by feeder bus routes, bicycle rental, short rental of cars and ride sharing. The goal is to allow travel from one sub-city-centre to another in 20 minutes.

=== Tram ===
An interim report in 2019 suggested that Põhja-Tallinn needed a new tram line because of building work that would lead to increased populations there, and that main tram lines should go from the city centre to Väike-Õismäe (Astangu), Mustamäe, Järve, Priisle, Maardu, Kopli, Stroomi, Viimsi, Peetri (Jüri) and Tabasalu. The "Tallinn Development Strategy for 2035", published in 2020, scrapped most of the previously suggested lines. Instead, new tram lines will go between Ülemiste and Vanasadama (connecting Old Town Harbour with Tallinn Airport), Kesklinn and Rahu tee (going to the Northern side of Lasnamäe), Kesklinn and Pelguranna (going to Põhja-Tallinn), Kesklinn and Peetri (going to the Rae Parish outside of Tallinn). Smaller network changes will connect Pärnu mnt and Tartu mnt by Rävala boulevard. The development strategy does not include a schedule for completing most of these lines. The line to Vanasadama was finished in 2024, at an approximate cost of €55 million.

New trams were purchased to replace older trams and cover the needs of new lines. 23 new trams built by Pojazdy Szynowe PESA Bydgoszcz (PESA) arrived in 2024 and 2025. There are 10 more trams planned to be purchased for arrival in 2027 and 2028.

=== Trolleybus ===
According to Tallinn Development Plan 2035, all trolleybuses would be replaced by battery electric buses by 2035. Tallinn city government has decided not to follow this plan, instead buying 40 new trolleybuses with off-wire capability to replace the old ones. 27.6 million euros has been allocated for design and construction of the first stage of a plan to modernize the network infrastructure. Currently, TLT owns 45 trolleybuses, which will remain in operation until the end of their serviceable lifetime (the average age of the trolleybuses in 2019 was 13.2 years). Trolleybuses are the main backbone of public transportation in Mustamäe district.

=== Commuter train ===
In 2020, Tallinn announced plans to open new train routes within Tallinn city in the next 15 years. According to plan, no new railway lines need to be constructed, but some that are currently used only for freight will additionally carry commuter trains. One of the new routes is planned to run between the rapidly-developing areas of Ülemiste and Kopli. Three transfer stations to connect to the existing commuter rail lines are planned for Kristiine (Lilleküla station), Tondi and Järve. The city is planning to use trains that belong to Elron. The plan is to have more departures within the city to make the commuter trains more attractive for passengers.

In 2019, Estonia's Ministry of Economic Affairs and Communications proposed a ring rail line to better connect the Eastern and Western parts of Tallinn. The trains should either use existing lines to the north of lake Ülemiste, or new lines to the south. The planned new line to the south will allow freight to be redirected away from Tallinn city centre, freeing capacity for commuter trains. Planned Rail Baltic (European gauge railway) would help to materialize this plan somewhat because it could have parallel railway (13 km) with Russian gauge (used in Finland, Estonia, Latvia etc.) and local train stations on it, but it wouldn't reach to Saue parish, so that part would have to be built in addition (14 km). Ring rail line would be important for Saku, Saue and Rae parishes, which this railway would pass. All these parishes especially Rae and Saue are rapidly developing as huge low density suburban regions, although they're not part of Tallinn. This plan could help to reduce car driving in already congested Tallinn. Proposed ring rail would be 27 km long and would go from Lagedi to Saue.

The Government of Estonia announced of plans to electrify all railways (800 km) in Estonia starting from 2022 with €300 million, but Estonia's Ministry of Economic Affairs and Communications has proposed that Elron should instead buy new hydrogen trains for Tallinn - Viljandi commuter railway line as a test line. Use of hydrogen trains would be significantly cheaper and saved money could be used to make rail transportation faster. Studies of this plan are currently underway. This railroad also goes through Tallinn and has some stations in the city's boundaries.

=== Proposed public transportation terminals ===
New public transportation terminals will be built in Ülemiste and Kristiine (Lilleküla). The terminal in Lilleküla is named Kristiine HUB (between current train station and Kristiine keskus). Ülemiste terminal will be the Tallinn's new main train station, between current Ülemiste train station, T1 Mall of Tallinn and Ülemiste keskus. It will also be Tallinn's new international railway station where trains will go towards Riga (Rail Baltica), St.Petersburg and Helsinki (Tallinn-Helsinki railway tunnel aka Talsinki). According to plans, these two terminals should be the places where train, bus and tram routes connect to each other for easier and more convenient transfer between different public transportation vehicles. The construction of Ülemiste terminal should end in 2026. The Kristiine HUB should be completed before 2035.

Plan of what changes will happen with current Viru bus terminal are not revealed yet.

=== Bicycle road network ===
Tallinn has promised to become friendlier for bicycles and other "light traffic" by 2028. Tallinn Cycling Strategy 2018–2028 is an official guide of what the city should do to become a better place for cycling. It contains the map of Tallinn's planned main cycle paths, which should all be built by 2028. The plan includes two types of cycling path for Tallinn: recreational paths (in Estonian: tervisevõrk) and core network paths (in Estonian: põhivõrk). The two types of paths will be connected to each other.

Most of the recreational paths would be on the city's outskirts in suburban districts like Nõmme, Pirita and Haabersti, where they would make up a significant part of the proposed bicycle paths. These recreational paths may be used by cyclists, pedestrians, and users of small electric vehicles such as electric scooters. Most of these are designed to be completely separated from car traffic. Most of the cycling paths that currently exist are recreational paths.

Core network paths are planned to be the main bicycle path type in the districts of Kesklinn (city centre), Lasnamäe, Kristiine, Põhja-Tallinn and Mustamäe. Creating new bicycle paths has proven to be the most difficult in the city centre where some roads are historically very narrow and others have a lot of car traffic. City officials are not keen on reducing traffic lanes for cyclists and pedestrians. According to the Tallinn cycling strategy, core network path type bicycle roads are meant to be separated from both cars and pedestrians to ensure the safety of all infrastructure users. Therefore, only cyclists and riders of small electric vehicles can use core network paths. One good example of this type of cycling path in Tallinn is Reidi tee.

The subject has brought up controversy because city residents and city officials have differing opinions. The Estonian media has been highlighting how dangerous the current state of bicycle paths in the city centre is, and how cheaply they could be temporarily rectified. City officials have been against activist solutions. Many kilometers of new "cycling paths" (in Estonian: jalgrattatee) are rather mixed-use sidewalks (in Estonian: kergliiklustee, literally "light traffic road"). Such sidewalks are dangerous, especially in the city centre, where many more people live and commute.

In 2020 the district governor of Kesklinn (city centre) Monika Haukanõmm stated that in 10–15 years' time, cycling would be the fastest mode of transportation in the district of Kesklinn: "The heart of the city must be better reached by public transportation than today and along footpaths and bicycle paths, which should give a reason not to come to the city centre by car. To do this, we need to think about how to increase the quality of street space so that we can compete with the quality of urban space of Helsinki, Riga and also Stockholm in 10-15 years. Fewer cars and more light traffic means more light roads (mixed-use sidewalks?). The goal is for bicycles and bikes to become the fastest means of transportation in the city centre, and they also have their own space for movement." According to Tallinn Development plan 2035, cycling should make up at least 11% of all traffic in the city in 2035. Cycling, riding with small electric vehicles and ride sharing should feed the tram, bus and commuter train lines, thus it should be seen as part of the public transportation system.

=== Light metro ===
In 2024, a group of experts and well-known economists, referred to as the metro group, proposed two light metro lines in Tallinn. One line would run from Paljassaare through the city centre to Rae Municipality (North - South route), and the other from Lasnamäe through the city centre to Õismäe and Mustamäe (West - East route). The goal is to reduce the need for personal cars when traveling within Tallinn. They claim that with the light metro, it would be possible to travel from Õismäe to Priisle in 25 minutes instead of 50, and from Kalamaja to Rae Municipality in 15 minutes instead of 40. The distance of the line from Lasnamäe to Õismäe would be 20 kilometers, while it would be ten kilometers between Peetri (Rae Municipality) and Kalamaja. The metro would be mainly above ground and would go underground only in the city centre (approximately 4.5 kilometers). Light metro trains are expected to have three to five carriages. Approximately 250,000 Talliners live in the immediate vicinity of the proposed light metro lines.

The cost of the project is estimated to one-and-a-half billion euros. The group believes that if there is political will, it would be possible to complete the project by 2030.

"Ülemiste City (in south-eastern Tallinn) is developing at a tremendous speed, now imagine that we want to drive home from work to the Põhjala Factory (in northern Tallinn) and it takes 50 minutes. If we think about where else we can get to in 50 minutes from Ülemiste City (10.5 kilometers) - we can reach Paide (85 kilometers) by car . . . The urban planners of Stockholm, according to which metros of Stockholm and Copenhagen were built, have calculated (that) half an hour, should take you from door to door, from work to home," said architect Jaan Jagomägi. He added that Tallinn is shaped in a way that it is not possible to cross the city in half an hour with the existing transport. To date, no leading politicians in Tallinn have given the plan enthusiastic support.
