= Timeline of Tallinn =

Overview of the timeline of Tallinn, Estonia

The following is a timeline of the history of the city of Tallinn, Estonia.

== Prior to 17th century ==
- 5,000 BCE - The sea still reaches the foot of the cliffs of Toompea
- 3,000 BCE - First signs of a settlement in Tallinn.
- ca. 750 BCE - fortified settlement first built at Iru near Tallinn, at the Pirita river bend. It is used until the 5th century BCE and then again during the 4th−2nd century BCE.
- ca. 450 CE - Iru hillfort is built at the site of the former fortified settlement.
- 9th century - Scandinavians (Varangians) start making trade voyages to East Slavs along the Gulf of Finland. During this period, the warm-water Tallinn Bay emerged as a vital trade harbor, laying the foundation for the city's significance as a trading hub in the region.
- 1032 - the naval battle at the "Iron Gate" possibly occurs near Aegna island, where a Novgorod fleet is defeated by a local fleet.
- Ca. 1050 - Iru hillfort is abandoned for unknown reasons and Lindanise Fort is built on Toompea hill. It will become the seat of the independent Revala County. Rus' chronicles refer to it as Kolyvan and it may be related to the giant-hero Kalev in Estonian mythology, who is thought to be buried in Toompea, which is a tumulus on his grave.
- 1206 - 1st Danish attempt to conquer Saaremaa island, but it may have occurred in Lindanise in Revala instead and the opposing German chronicles may have altered the accounts.
- 1211 - the Livonian Brothers of the Sword raid Lääne County. In response, Revala County enters the Livonian Crusade against the crusaders.
- 1219
  - Toompea Castle taken by forces of Valdemar II of Denmark.
  - St Mary's Cathedral built by Danes.
- 1224 - Danish authorities merge Revala County with Harju County, while Reval remains the seat of the county and of Danish Estonia.
- 1227 - Town charter granted.
- 1228 - Toompea Castle taken by the Livonian Knights.
- 1237 - Toompea Castle returned to the Danes.
- 1240 – St. Olaf's Church built.
- 1265 – Town wall constructed.
- 1275 – St. Nicholas' Church built (approximate date).
- 1284 – Reval becomes part of Hanseatic League.
- 1343
  - April: Reval besieged by Estonian forces.
  - Brotherhood of Blackheads formed.
- 1347 – Reval ( & Esthonia) sold to Teutonic Order by Valdemar III of Denmark.
- 1360 - Town "fortified."
- 1370 – Pikk Hermann tower built.
- 1372
  - School built on Pikk Street.
  - Population: 3,250.
- 1404 – Town Hall construction completed.
- 1410 – Great Guild Hall built.
- 1422 – Raeapteek pharmacy in business.
- 1433 – Fire.
- 1436 – St. Bridget's Convent built.
- 1441 – Christmas tree display in Town Hall Square begins.
- 1464 - Plague.
- 1475 – The artillery tower Kiek in de Kök built.
- 1514 - December: Christmas tree displayed in marketplace.
- 1530
  - Fat Margaret tower built.
  - Old Thomas weathervane installed atop Town Hall.
- 1532 – Plague.
- 1561
  - Reval becomes a dominion of Sweden.
  - St. Mary's Cathedral, Tallinn changes from Roman Catholic to Lutheran.
- 1569 – Reval besieged by Danes.
- 1570 – Reval besieged by Russians.
- 1577 – Reval again besieged by Russians.

== 17th century ==
- 1630 – Reval Gymnasium (school) established.
- 1633 - Gymnasiums printing house is founded.
- 1638 - Beginning of regular post between Tallinn and other Swedish cities.
- 1675 - First newspaper in Tallinn, Revalsche Post-Zeitung, starts operating.
- 1684 - Devastating fire in Toompea.

== 18th century ==
- 1710 – Peter the Great's army besieges Reval, Reval surrenders (Siege of Reval (1710)), and Russian rule begins.
- 1719 – Catherinethal Palace (Kadriorg Palace) built by Peter the Great.
- 1725 - Toompea orphanage is founded.
- 1726 - Naval Blockade of Reval (1726)
- 1758 - City is released for the task to hold up the defence facilities.
- 1765 - Domeschool is changed to Academic Knightschool. Domechurch loses its control over the school and it is given to Estonian Knighthood.
- 1769- Mihkli church-monastery is reconstructed as an orthodox church.
- 1772
  - Toompea Castle rebuilt.
  - Population: 6,954.
  - Cemeteries are taken outside of city walls.
- 1774 – Kopli cemetery and Mõigu cemetery established.
- 1782 - Population: 10,653
- 1784 - First theatre is founded by August von Kotzebue.
- 1795 - The Tallinna saksa teater is founded.

== 19th century ==
- 1801 - British navy under the command of admiral Nelson is on the Bay of Tallinn, but he doesn't attack.
- 1816 – Population: 12,000.
- 1817 - Tallinn's customs affair
- 1820 - Oleviste Church's tower burns down.
- 1831 - Cholera strikes Tallinn (758 victims)
- 1843 - The renovation of city's canalisation begins. It is finished by the year 1860.
- 1844 – St. Peter and St. Paul's Cathedral, Tallinn completed.
- 1848
  - Estonian Knighthood House rebuilt.
  - Cholera attack again (1029 victims)
- 1851 – Population: 24,000.
- 1857
  - Tallinn is removed from the list of fortress cities, which marks the beginning of Tallinns rapid expansion and becoming a metropol.
  - First baltic singing festival takes place in Tallinn.
- 1860 - First edition of the Revalsche Zeitung published
- 1864 – Kanut Guild Hall built.
- 1865 - The Gas factory of Tallinn is finished.
- 1867 – St. John's Church built.
- 1870
  - Railway begins operating.
  - Baltic Station (Tallinn Railway station, Balti jaam) built.
- 1880 - June: Estonian Song Festival held in city.
- 1881 - The construction of a modern canalisation begins.
- 1883
  - Tallinn City Archives open.
  - Great Synagogue of Tallinn founded.
- 1886 – Glehn Castle built.
- 1888 – Horse-drawn tram begins operating.
- 1889 - Toompea is finally administratively united with Reval.
- 1896 – Estonian Song Festival relocates to Reval.
- 1900
  - Nevsky Cathedral completed.
  - Population: 66,292.

== 20th century ==
=== 1900s-1940s ===
- 1901 - First Estonian newspaper Teataja begins circulation.
- 1902 - Russalka Memorial erected.
- 1903 - Rahumäe cemetery established.
- 1905 - January: Labour strike.
- 1906 - Estonia theatre group active.
- 1910 - German Theatre built.
- 1913
  - Power Plant begins operating.
  - Bekker Port and Estonia Theatre open.
- 1914 - Industrial Art School founded.
- 1916 - Defence Forces Cemetery established.
- 1917
  - March: Labor strike.
  - November: Bolsheviks in power.
  - Reval renamed "Tallinn" (approximate date).
  - Nõmme gained borough rights.
  - Population: 160,000.
- 1918
  - February: Germans in power.
  - National Library of Estonia established.
  - Tallinn College of Engineering and Higher Music School established.
- 1919 - Art Museum of Estonia established.
- 1921 - Tallinn French School founded.
- 1923
  - Pääsküla-Tallinn electric railway begins operating.
  - Hiiu Stadium built.
  - Järve train station opens.
- 1924
  - Tallinn Jewish School established.
  - Elektriraudtee begins operating.
  - November 3 – Kivimäe train station opens.
- 1925
  - Narva Road tram begins operating.
  - Chamber of Commerce founded.
- 1926
  - Estonian Radio Symphony Orchestra active.
  - Kadriorg Stadium built.
  - Nõmme gained town rights.
  - Hiiu train station opens.
- 1928 - Lilleküla train station opens.
- 1932 - Laagri train station opens.
- 1933 - Pirita-Kose-Kloostrimetsa Circuit opens.
- 1935 - Estonian Maritime Museum founded.
- 1936
  - Tallinn Airport opens.
  - Tallinn Technical Institute active.
- 1937 - French Lyceum built.
- 1938 - Kopli freight station opens.
- 1939 - Tallinn Zoo founded.
- 1940 - July 29: Town of Nõmme merged to Tallinn.
- 1941 - August: Germans in power.
- 1942 - Bombing by Soviets.
- 1943
  - Bombing by Soviets.
  - March 24: Bungsberg (ship) sunk.
- 1944 - Bombing by Soviets.
- 1945 - Tallinna Autobussikoondis founded.
- 1946 - Institute of Theology of Estonian Evangelical Lutheran Church established.
- 1947 - Monument to the Liberators of Tallinn unveiled.

=== 1950s-1990s ===
- 1952 - Tallinn Pedagogical Institute established.
- 1955 - July: Television begins broadcasting.
- 1956 - Kalevi Keskstaadion built.
- 1959
  - Tallinn Song Stage built.
  - Bus Station moved to its current location from the Stalin Square (Viru Square).
  - Population: 283,071.
- 1960 - July 21: Tallinna Kaubamaja (department store) opened.
- 1961
  - December 1 – Tallinn Botanic Garden established.
  - Development of Õismäe area begins.
  - Tallinn Music High School founded.
- 1962 - Kalevi Spordihall built.
- 1964 - Kalamaja cemetery destroyed.
- 1965
  - July 6 – Trolleybuses begin operating.
  - Helsinki-Tallinn ferry resumes operation.
  - New Bus Station built.
- 1966 - August 2: Tallinn Old Town conservation area established.
- 1969 - Pirita Velodrome opens.
- 1972 - May 5: Viru Hotel opens.
- 1975 - Population: 299,000.
- 1977 - Development of Lasnamäe area begins.
- 1980
  - MS Georg Ots begins operating.
  - Linnahall, TV Tower and Post Office built.
  - April 6 – Hotel Olümpia opens.
- 1986 - Muuga Harbour opens.
- 1987
  - Singing demonstrations against Soviet occupation begin.
  - Estonian History Museum inaugurated.
- 1988 - Estonian Business School established.
- 1989
  - Estonian Film Archives active.
  - Population: 478,974.
- 1990 - Estonian School of Diplomacy established.
- 1991
  - Estoniya newspaper begins publication.
  - Estonian Maritime Academy and University Nord founded.
- 1992
  - Port authority established.
  - Estonian Academy of Security Sciences, International University Audentes, Mainor Business School, and Tallinn University of Applied Sciences established.
- 1993 - Concordia International University Estonia established.
- 1997
  - Tammsaare tee extended to the interchange of Pärnu maantee and Järvevana tee.
  - Tallinn Black Nights Film Festival begins.
  - Euro University established.
- 1998 - Rocca al Mare Shopping Centre opens.
- 1999
  - Meriton Grand Hotel opens.
  - May 28 – Kristiine shopping centre opens.
- 2000 – Estonian Information Technology College established.

== 21st century ==
- 2001
  - A. Le Coq Arena (Lilleküla Stadium) and Saku Suurhall Arena open.
  - February 1 – Radisson SAS Hotel opens.
- 2002 - Eurovision Song Contest 2002 held.
- 2003
  - Kultuuritehas Polymer active.
  - Museum of Occupations opens.
- 2004
  - Viru Center with bus terminal opens.
  - Ülemiste Center opens.
- 2005
  - Tallinn University and Baltic Film and Media School established.
  - Theatre NO99 active.
- 2006 - Kumu Art Museum built.
- 2007
  - April: Bronze Night unrest.
  - December 10 – Swissôtel Tallinn opens.
  - Tallinn Synagogue built.
- 2008
  - NATO Cooperative Cyber Defence Centre built.
  - November 10 – Kitseküla train station opens.
- 2009
  - Väo Power Plant begins operating.
  - War of Independence Victory Column unveiled.
  - October 6 – Nokia Concert Hall opens.
  - October 9 – Solaris Center opens.
- 2010 - 23rd European Film Awards held.
- 2011
  - Tallinna TV begins broadcasting.
  - City designated a European Capital of Culture
- 2015 - Population: 439,286.
- 2017 - Tram line 4 extended to the airport.
- 2019 - Opening of Reidi tee between Kadriorg and the Old Port.

== See also ==
- List of mayors of Tallinn
- History of Tallinn
- Other names of Tallinn
- Timeline of Estonian history

== Bibliography ==
- "Reval", Hand-book for Northern Europe, London: John Murray, 1849
- George Henry Townsend (1877), "Revel", Manual of Dates (5th ed.), London: Frederick Warne & Co., hdl:2027/wu.89097349427
- "Reval" . Encyclopædia Britannica. Vol. 23 (11th ed.). 1910. pp. 211–212.
- "Reval", Russia, Leipzig: Karl Baedeker, 1914, OCLC 1328163
- William Henry Beable (1919), "Reval", Russian Gazetteer and Guide, London: Russian Outlook
- Trudy Ring, ed. (1995). "Tallinn". Northern Europe. International Dictionary of Historic Places. Fitzroy Dearborn. p. 719. ISBN 978-1-136-63944-9.
