= Lilleküla railway station =

Railway station in Tallinn, Estonia

Lilleküla
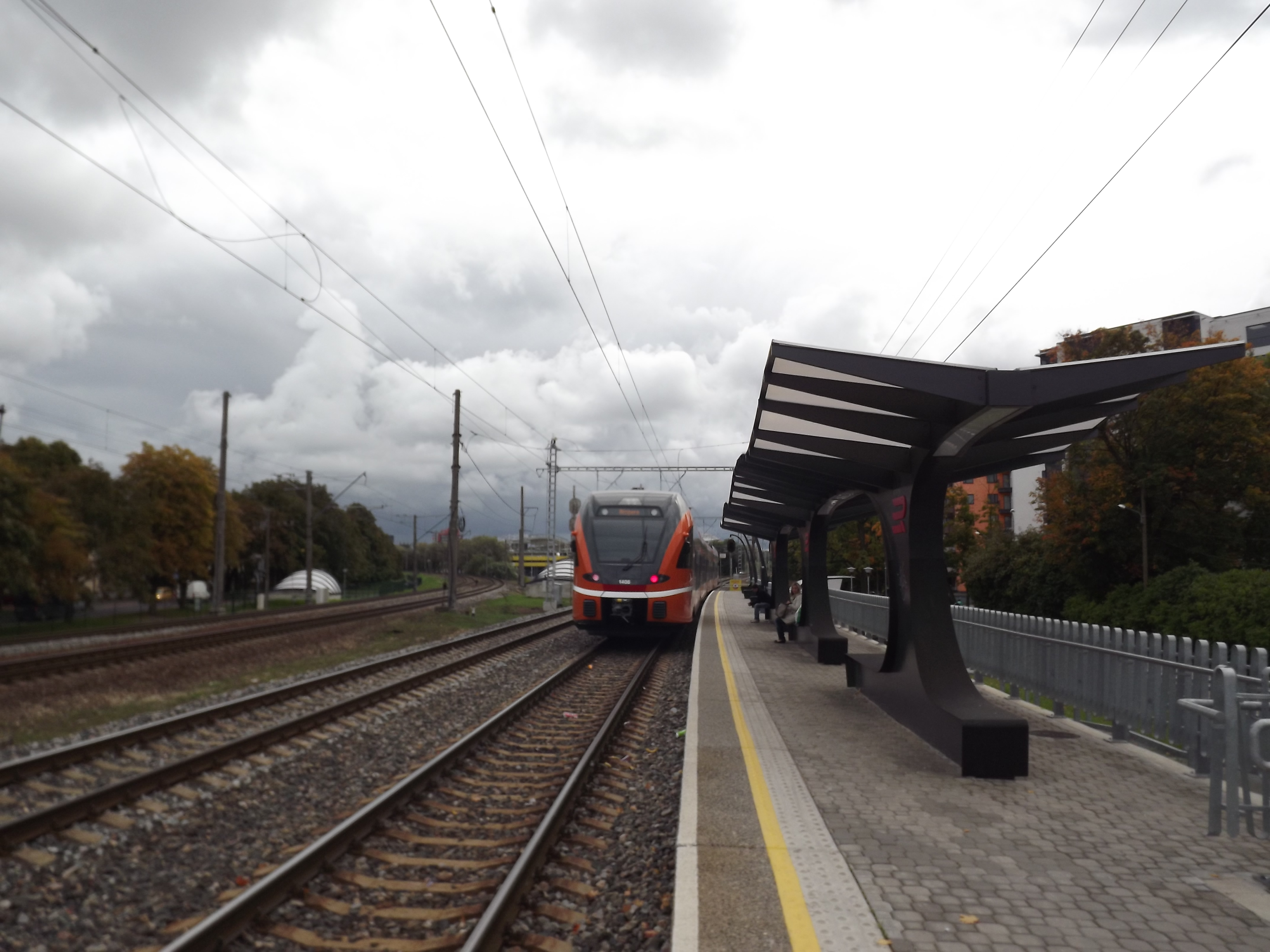
- Lilleküla station in 2013.

General information
- Location: Lilleküla, Kristiine, Tallinn, Harju County; Estonia
- Coordinates: 59°25′32″N 24°43′39″E
- System: railway station
- Owner: Eesti Raudtee (EVR)
- Line: Elron commuter rail
- Platforms: 2
- Tracks: 2
- Train operators: Elron
- Connections: Buses 23 32 67

Construction
- Structure type: at-grade

Other information
- Fare zone: I

History
- Opened: 1928; 98 years ago
- Electrified: 1924; 3 kV DC OHLE

Services
Preceding station	Elron	Following station
Tallinn Terminus	Tallinn–Turba/Paldiski	Tondi towards Turba, Kloogaranna or Paldiski
Location
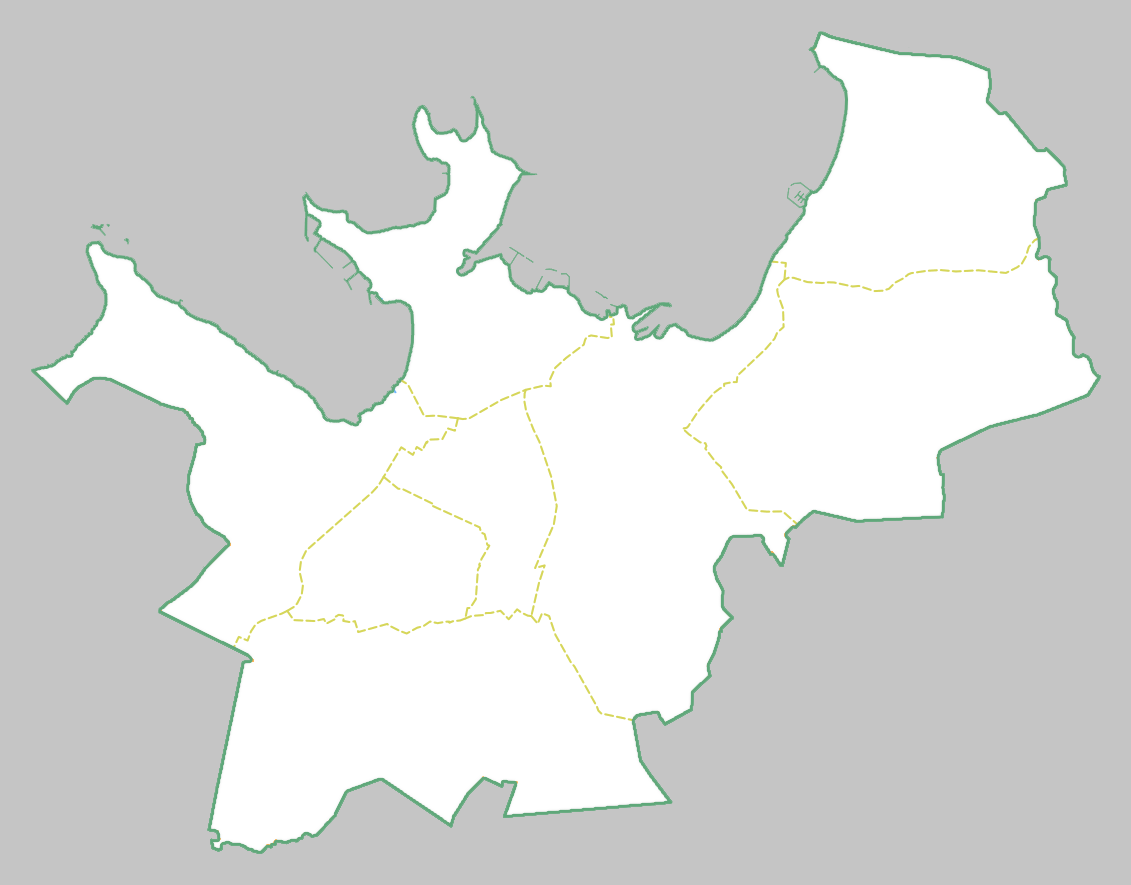
- Location within Estonia Location within Harju County Location within Tallinn

Lilleküla railway station (Estonian: Lilleküla raudteepeatus) is a railway station in the Kristiine district of Tallinn, the capital of Estonia. The station is situated between the subdistricts Lilleküla and Uus Maailm, and close to the Estonian national football home ground A. Le Coq Arena and Kristiine Keskus, one of the biggest and most popular shopping centres in Tallinn.

The station is served by all commuter trains heading to Keila, Paldiski, Turba and Kloogaranna. It consists of two 130 metre platforms. It is located about 2 km south of Baltic Station, it is the second stop on Elron's western route after the terminus at Tallinn's main railway station, Baltic Station.

Although the Tallinn–Paldiski railway already existed in 1870, a station on the site was opened in 1928. The line from Tallinn to back then a nearby town Nõmme (as far as Pääsküla) was electrified already in 1924. At first the station bore the name "Ameerika". There was also a little wooden station building which was demolished in 1998.

In 2012 the old platforms were replaced with new lower ones and a pedestrian tunnel was built.

== See also ==
- List of railway stations in Estonia
- Rail transport in Estonia
- Public transport in Tallinn
