= Lilleküla =

Subdistrict of Tallinn, Estonia

Coordinates: 59.4194936°N 24.7127849°E

- Subdistrict of Tallinn
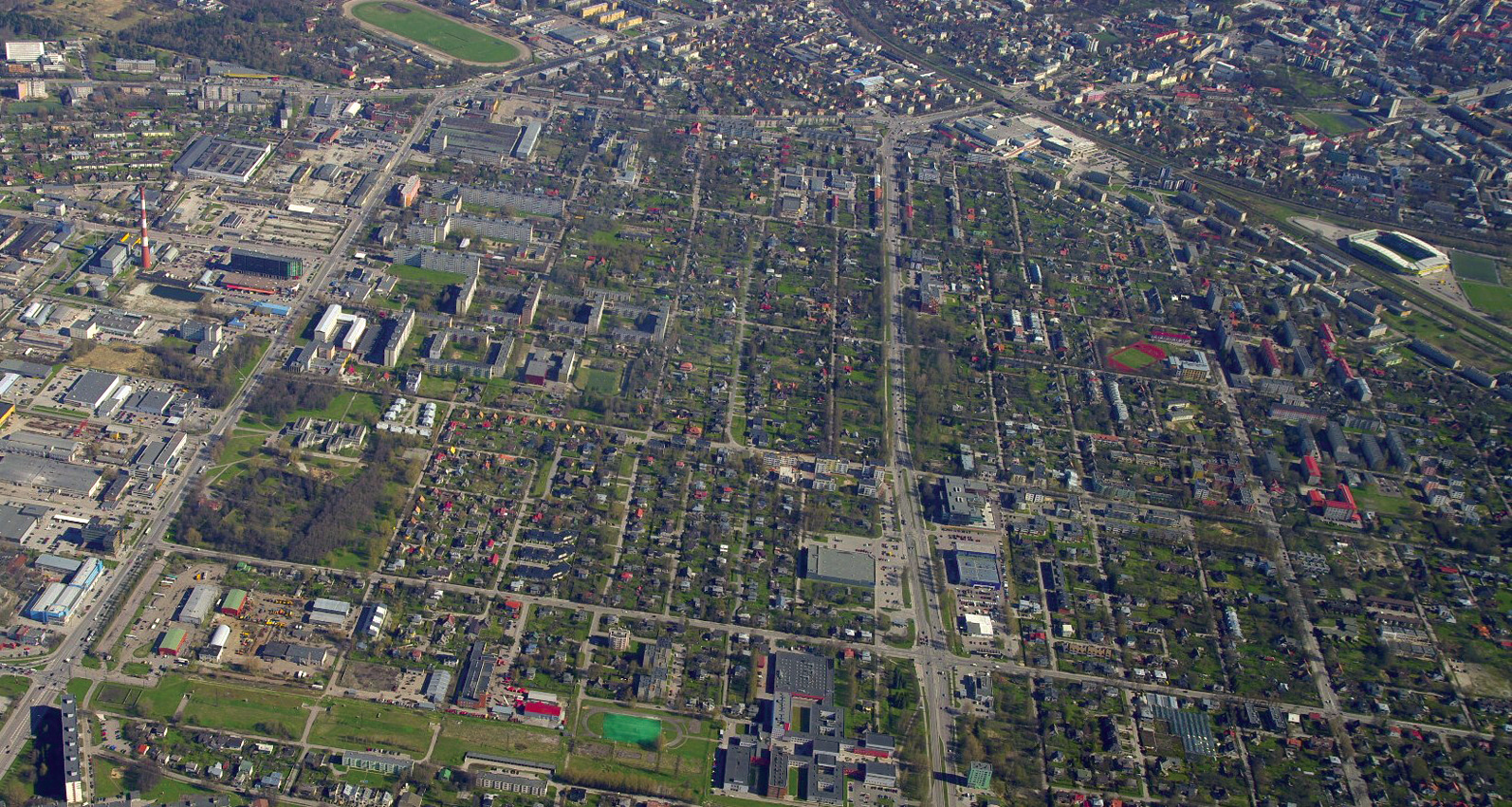
- Aerial view of Lilleküla.

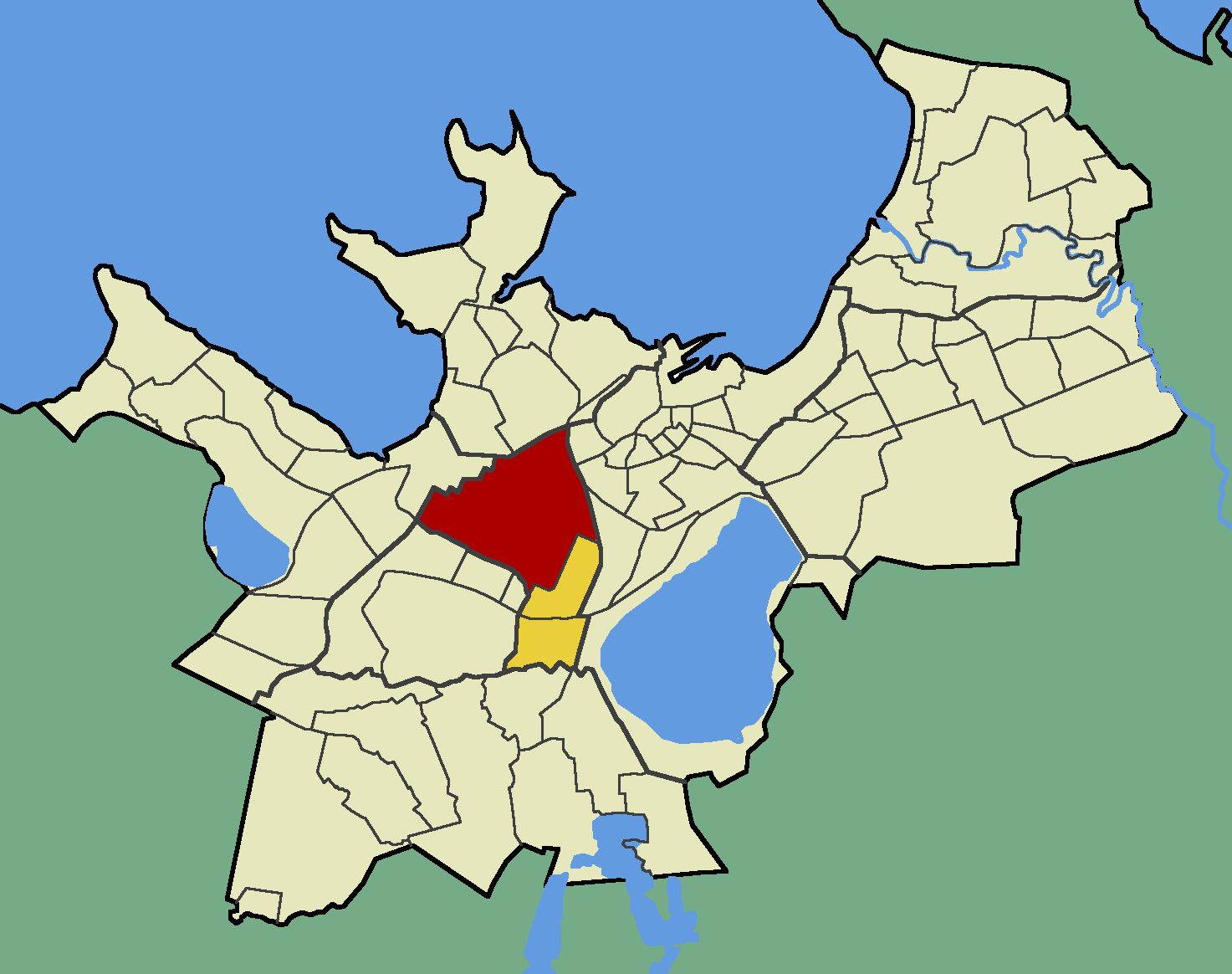
- Lilleküla within Kristiine District.
- Country: Estonia
- County: Harju County
- City: Tallinn
- District: Kristiine

Population (01.01.2015)
  - Total: 24,939

Lilleküla (lit. 'Flower Village') is a subdistrict of the district of Kristiine in Tallinn, the capital of Estonia. It has a population of 24,939 (As of 1 January 2015).

On the eastern side of Lilleküla there's a train station "Lilleküla" on Elron's western route.

One of the largest shopping centres in Estonia, Kristiine Centre, is located in Lilleküla.

== Gallery ==
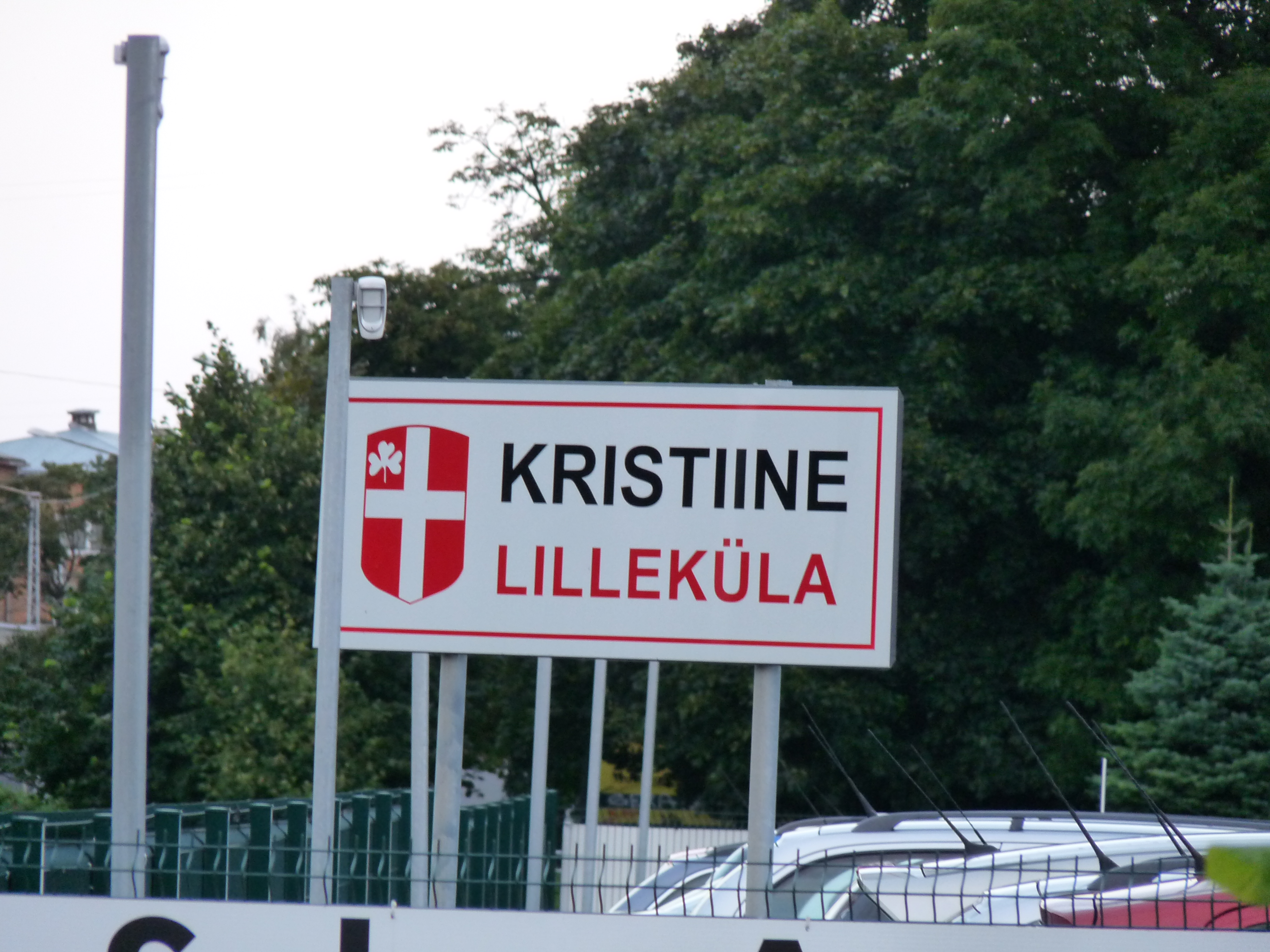

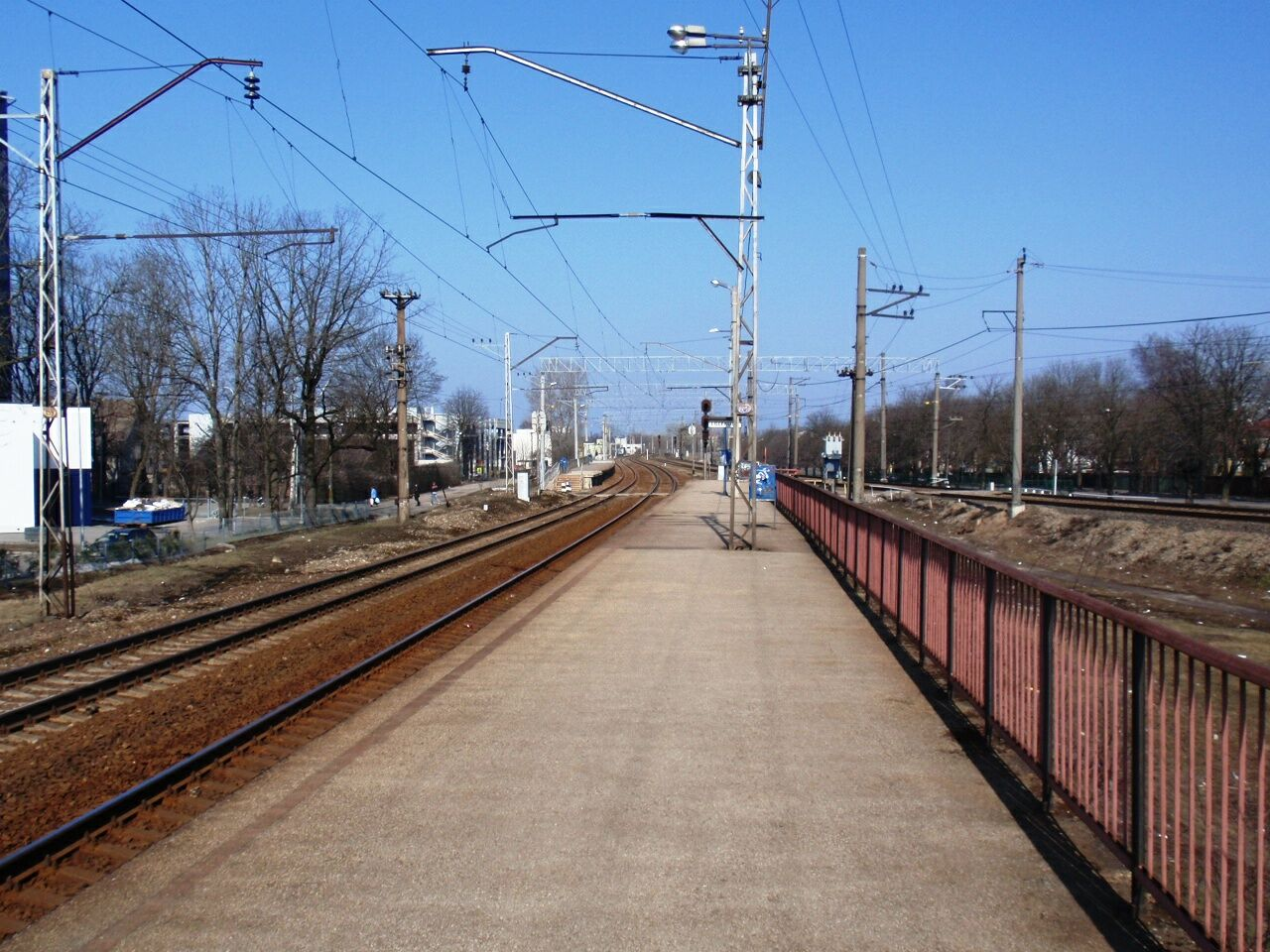
Lilleküla railway station

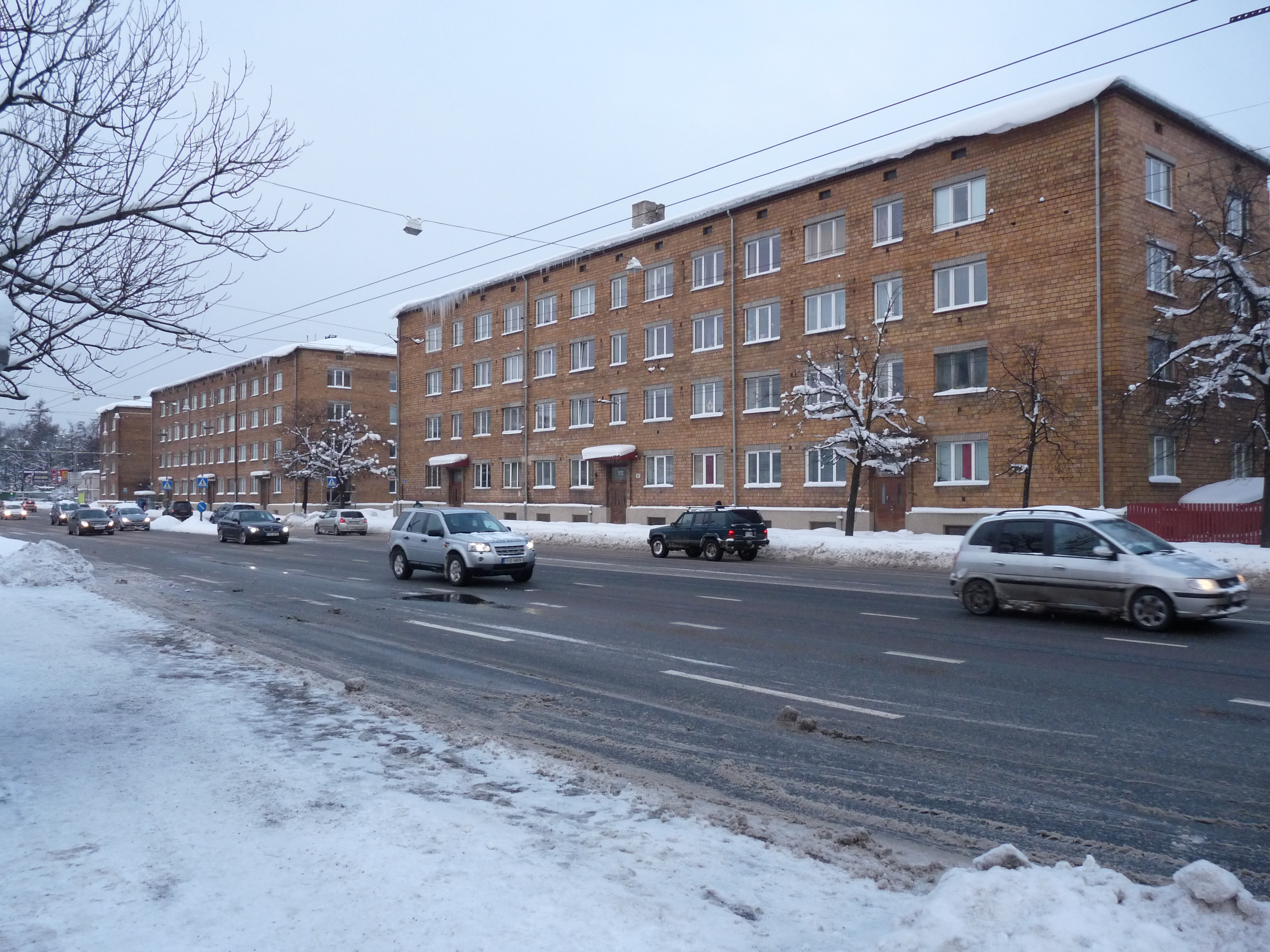
Houses on Endla street

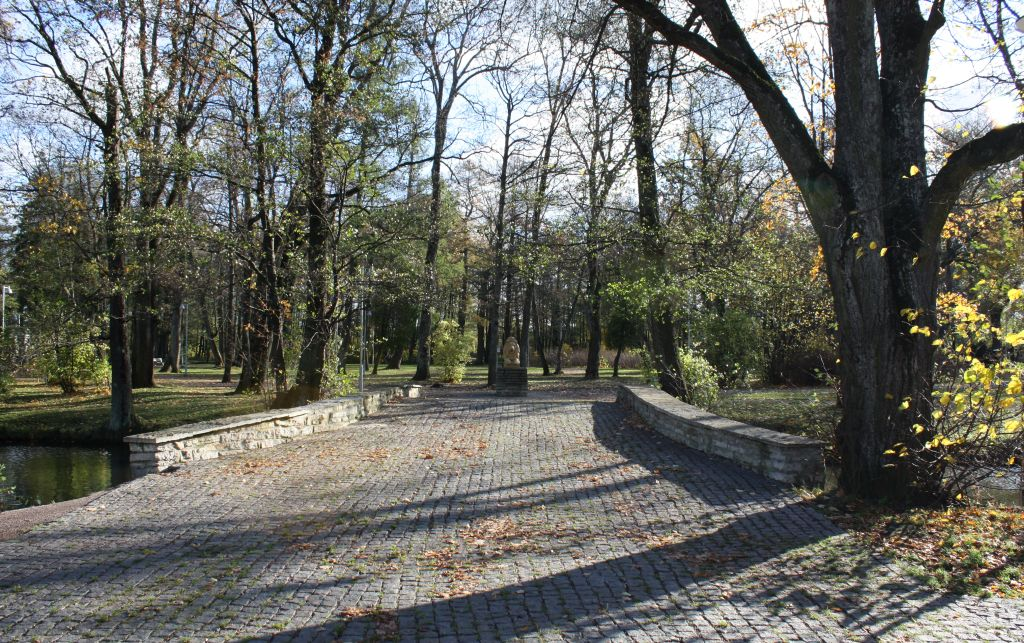
Löwenruh park

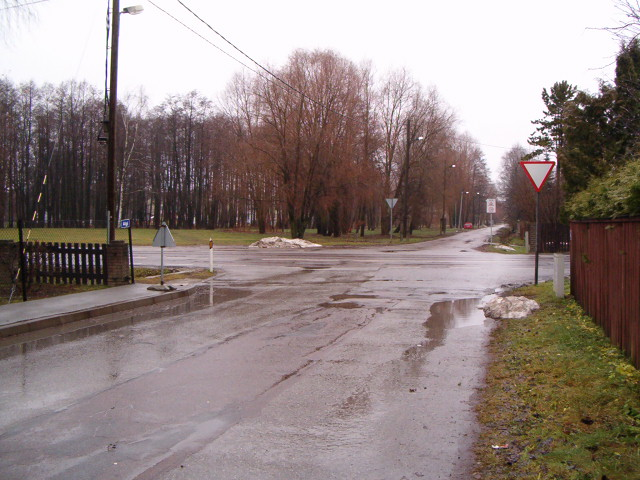

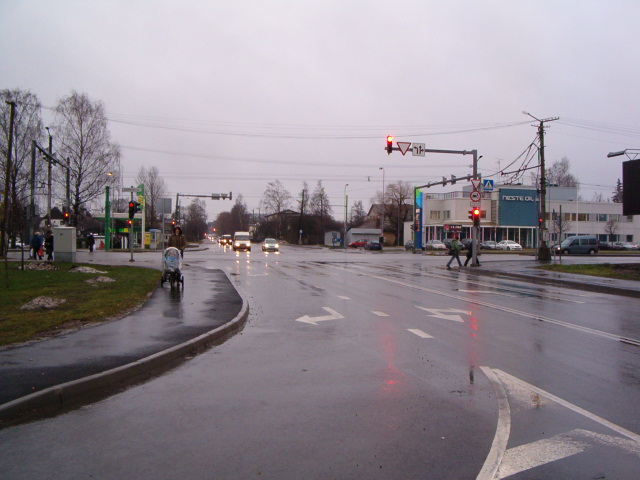

== See also ==
- Culture Factory Polymer
