= Järve, Tallinn =

Subdistrict of Tallinn, Estonia

Coordinates: 59.396498°N 24.710065°E

Järve
- Subdistrict of Tallinn
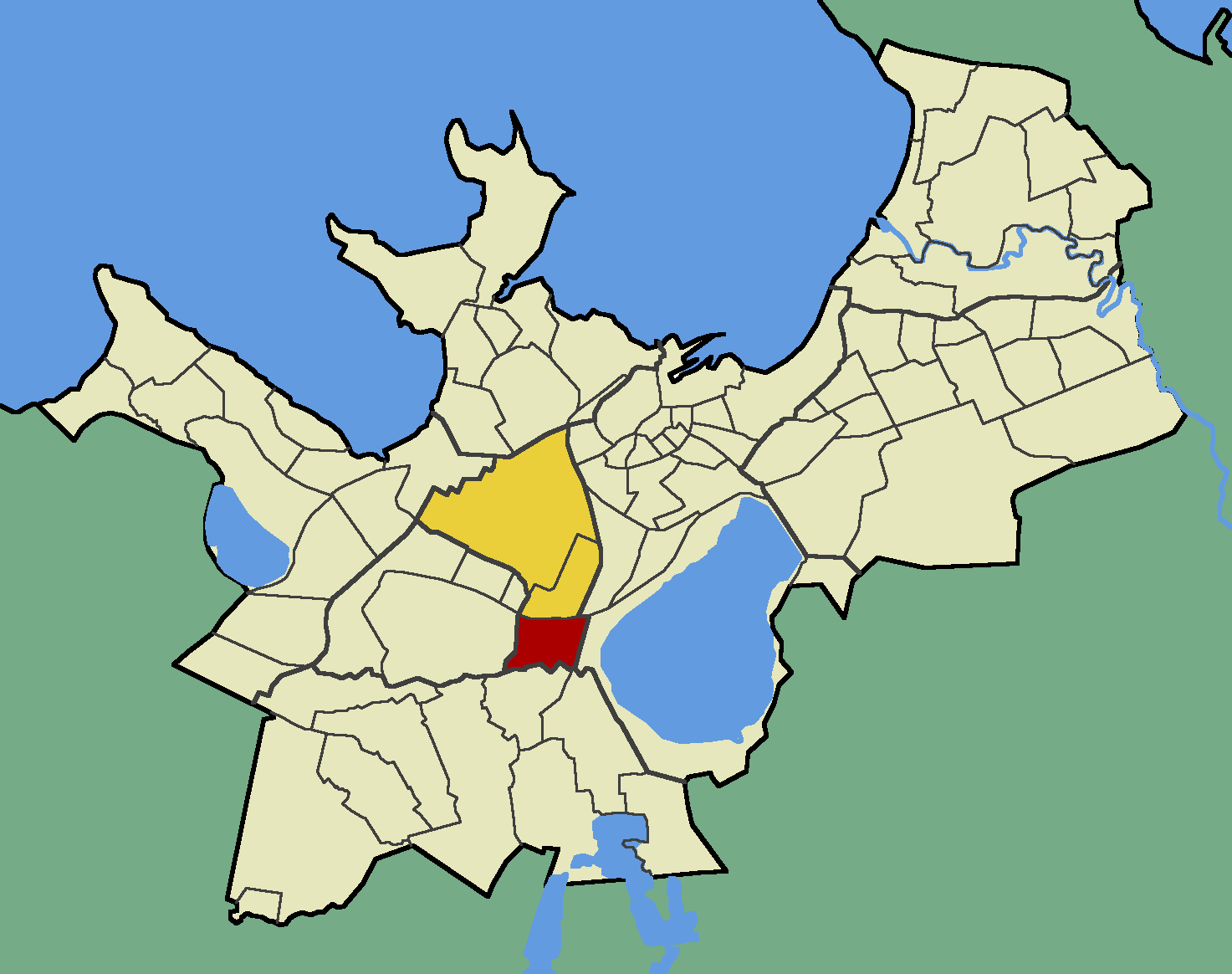
- Järve within Kristiine District.
- Country: Estonia
- County: Harju County
- City: Tallinn
- District: Kristiine

Population (01.01.2015)
  - Total: 2,969

Järve (Estonian for "Lake") is a subdistrict (Estonian: asum) in the district of Kristiine, Tallinn, the capital of Estonia. It has a population of 2,969 (As of 1 January 2015).

Järve has a railway station on the Elron western route.

== Gallery ==
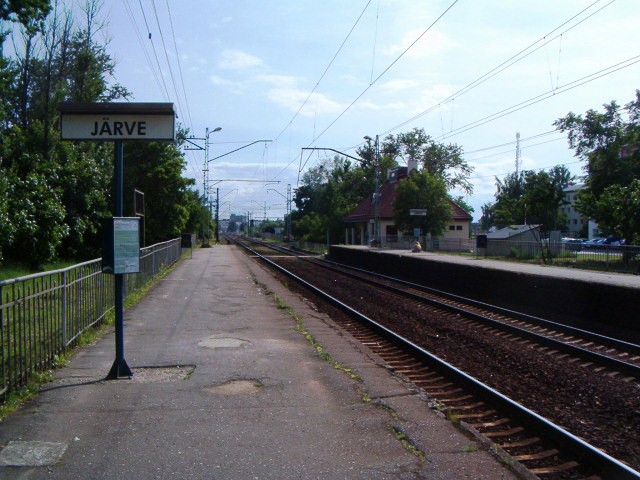
Järve train station

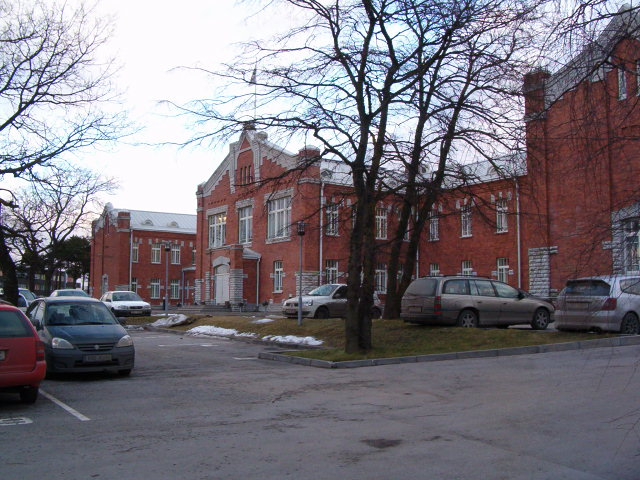
Main building of G4S Estonia

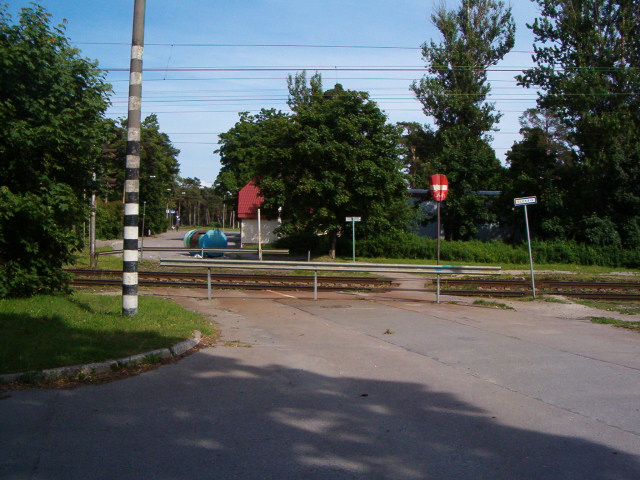
Railway overpass
