= Tallinn Department Store =

Shopping mall in Tallinn

- Tallinna Kaubamaja
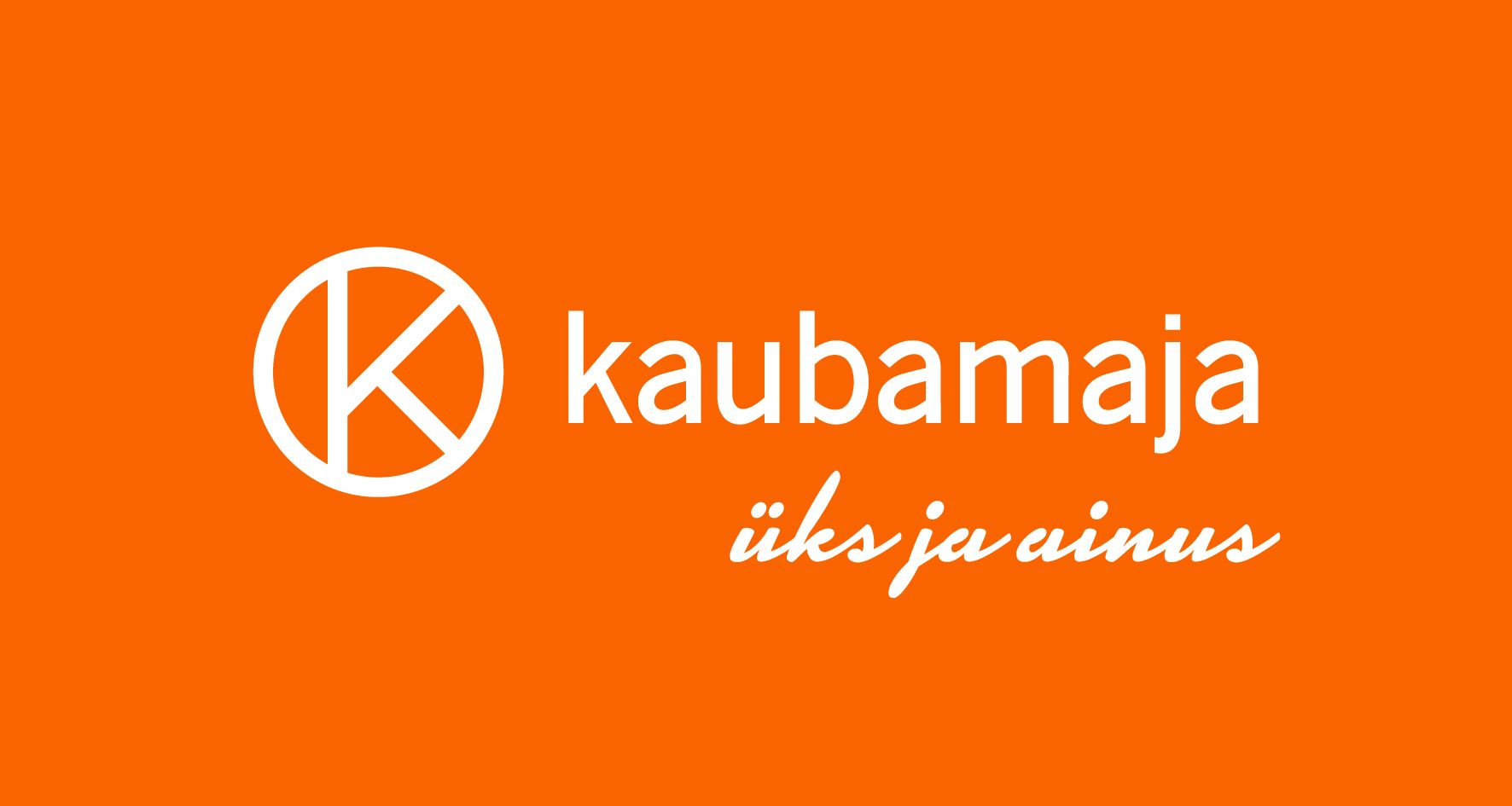
- Location: Tallinn, Estonia
- Coordinates: 59°26′06″N 24°45′23″E
- Address: Gonsiori 2, 10143 Tallinn, Estonia
- Website: www.kaubamaja.ee

Tallinn Department Store (Estonian: Tallinna Kaubamaja) is a department store in Tallinn, Estonia. The store owner is Tallinna Kaubamaja Group.

The store was opened in 1960. In 1973, the extension (nowadays B-block) was completed, and selling area was doubled.

In 2008, the chain of Kaubamaja shoe stores expanded, because Tallinna Kaubamaja had bought the stores of Suurtüki Naha- ja Kingaäri and ABC Kinga. ABC King has been selling shoes and clothing accessories since 1993. Today, they have grown into a chain of shoe stores with stores in all major shopping centers in Tallinn, Tartu and Pärnu.

In 2017, the architectural competition for the new store building was won by competition work "CITY BREAK".
