= Kristiine Centre =

Shopping mall in Tallinn

Kristiine Keskus
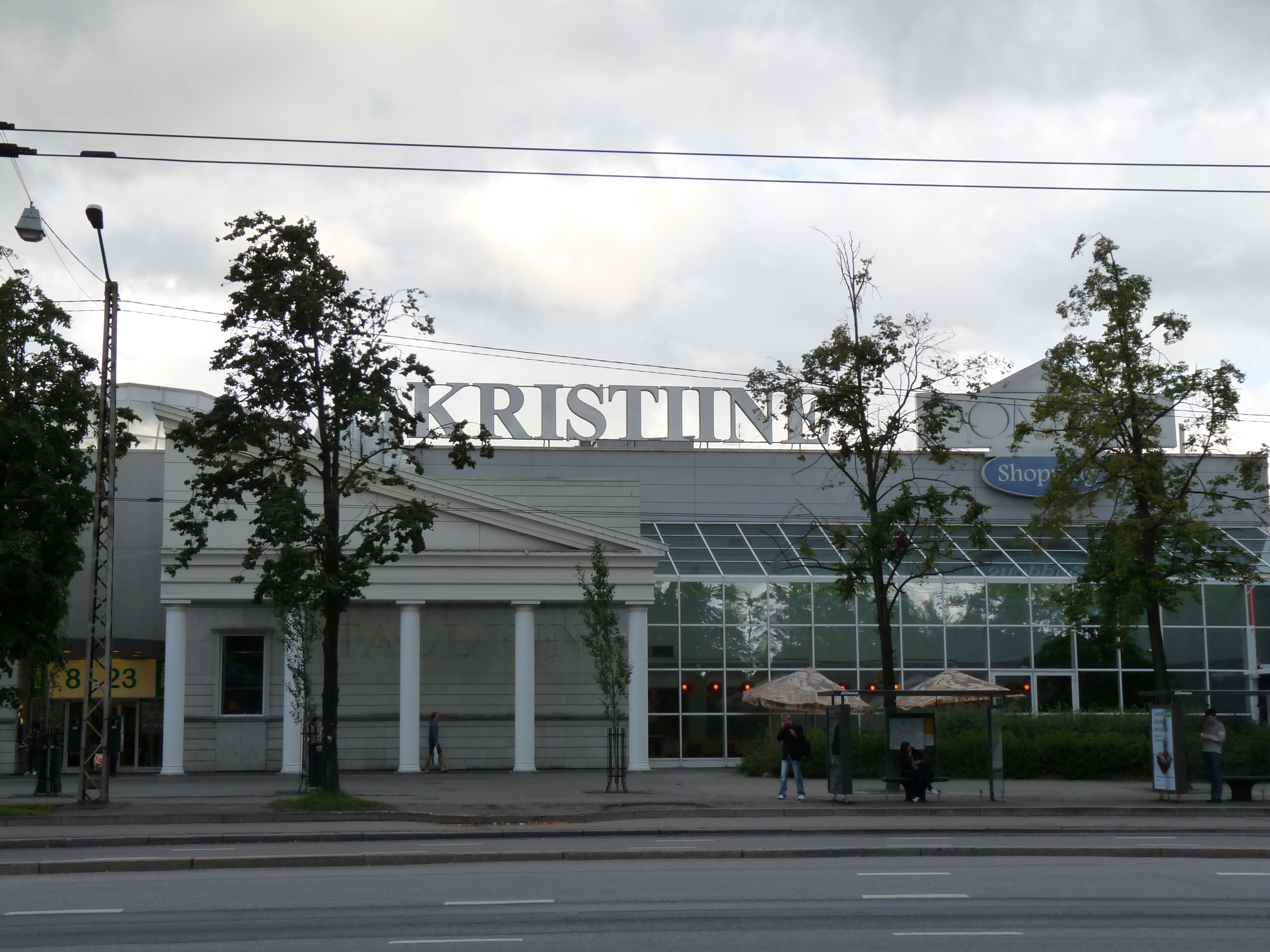
- Old part of Kristiine Centre
- Location: Kristiine, Tallinn, Estonia
- Coordinates: 59°25′36.48″N 24°43′27.33″E
- Address: Endla 45
- Opened: 28 May 1999
- Owner: EfTEN Kristiine OÜFormerly Citycon OYJ The owner of Rocca Al Mare
- Architect: Giovanni Bartoli
- Num. of stores: 170
- Floor area: 53,000 square metres (570,487 sq ft)
- Floors: 3
- Website: www.kristiinekeskus.ee

Kristiine Centre (Estonian: Kristiine Keskus) is a shopping centre in Tallinn, Estonia. It's situated in Kristiine district's subdistrict of Lilleküla. Kristiine is one of the largest shopping centres in Estonia by the number of shops. It has a gross leasable area of 53,000 m^{2} (570,000 sq ft) containing nearly 170 different shops (including 18 restaurants and cafés).

The shopping centre has three floors, with the shops and other commercial services on the ground and first floors. The third floor is reserved for parking. The biggest shops in the centre are Prisma, H&M, Marks and Spencer, Euronics, and Apollo. A O’Learys was opened in 2017. Kristiine Centre opened in 1999. At first, it was planned to be a 10,000 m^{2} (110,000 sq ft) shopping centre but a 21,000 m^{2} (230,000 sq ft) centre was built instead. The building cost 19,174 million euros. In 2002 the centre grew by 17,000 m^{2} (180,000 sq ft) (at first, the extension was planned to be a cinema). In 2010, a second extension was built, adding another 20,000 m^{2} (220,000 sq ft) to the centre's area.

On the 21st of February 2024, a fire damaged the warehouse of Kristiine Centre.
