= Kristiine =

District of Tallinn, Estonia

- District of Tallinn
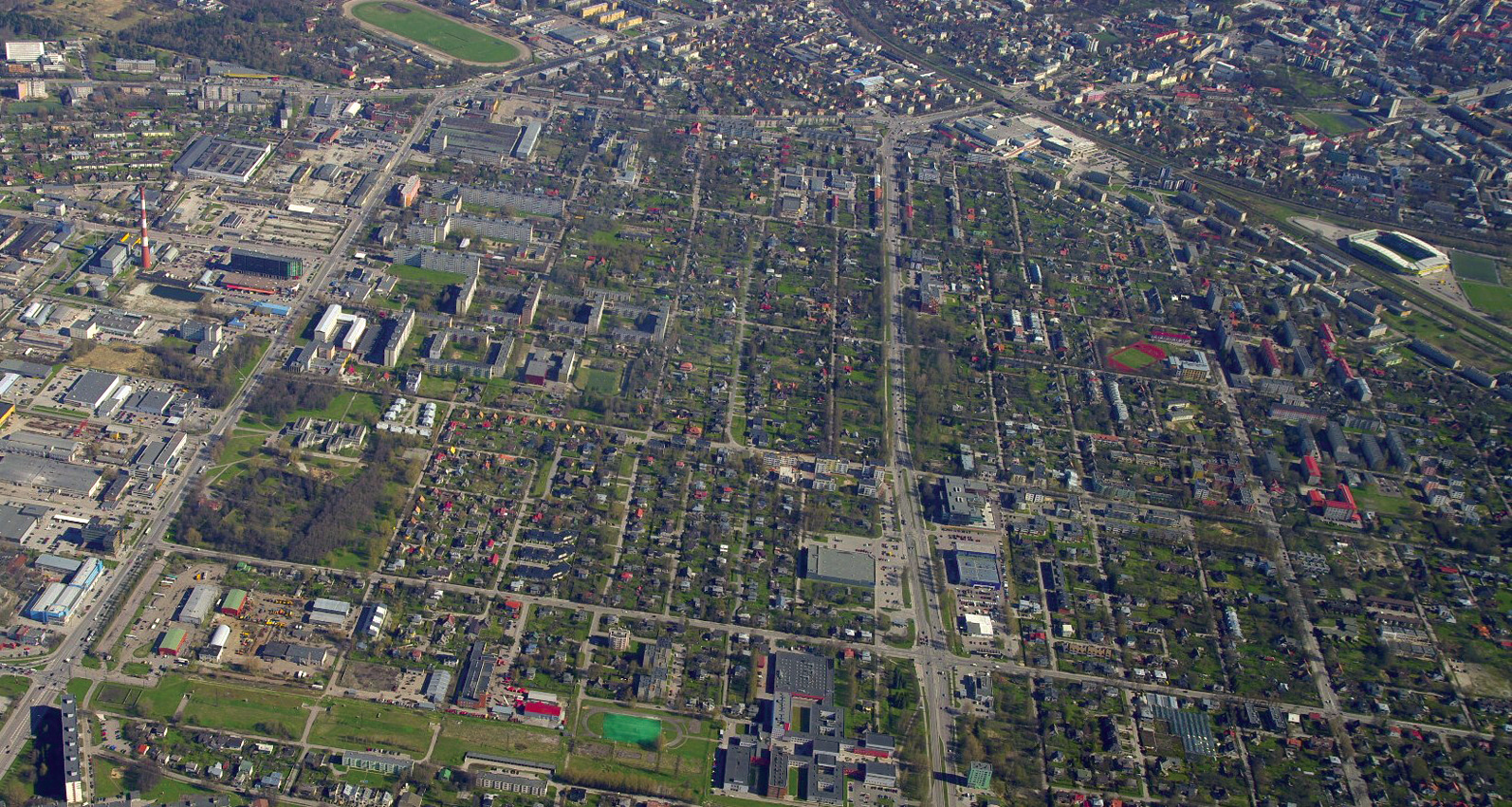
- Aerial view of northern part of Kristiine, mostly Lilleküla.

- Flag Coat of arms

- Location of Kristiine in Tallinn.
- Coordinates: 59°25′01″N 24°41′40″E
- Country: Estonia
- County: Harju County
- City: Tallinn

Government
  - District Elder: Renata Lukk (Estonia 200)

Area
  - Total: 9.4 km^{2} (3.6 sq mi)

Population (01.11.2014)
  - Total: 31,739
  - Density: 3,400/km^{2} (8,700/sq mi)
- Website: tallinn.ee

Kristiine (Estonian for 'Christina') is one of the 8 administrative districts (Estonian: linnaosa) of Tallinn, the capital of Estonia.

Kristiine is divided into 3 subdistricts (Estonian: asum):

- Järve
- Lilleküla
- Tondi

The name of Kristiine originates from the Swedish Queen Christina, under whose rule in 1653 the area was divided into 46 pieces (each of them 9 ha) and sold to businessmen and city officials for 100 riksdaler. The whole area was called Christinental (Valley of Christina) and later Kristiine hayfield.

The elder of the district is Andrei Novikov (as of September 2013).

== Population ==
Kristiine has a population of 31,739 (As of 1 November 2014).

Ethnic composition 1989-2021
Ethnicity	1989		2000		2011		2021	
Ethnicity	amount	%	amount	%	amount	%	amount	%
Estonians	23433	57.4	20393	67.1	21296	72.9	23047	70.5
Russians	13508	33.1	7662	25.2	6386	21.8	6359	19.4
Ukrainians	-	-	-	-	516	1.77	771	2.36
Belarusians	-	-	-	-	291	1.00	292	0.89
Finns	-	-	-	-	111	0.38	178	0.54
Jews	-	-	-	-	84	0.29	72	0.22
Latvians	-	-	-	-	44	0.15	103	0.31
Germans	-	-	-	-	29	0.10	86	0.26
Tatars	-	-	-	-	41	0.14	49	0.15
Poles	-	-	-	-	43	0.15	44	0.13
Lithuanians	-	-	-	-	48	0.16	68	0.21
unknown	0	0.00	330	1.09	29	0.10	234	0.72
other	3879	9.50	2022	6.65	310	1.06	1402	4.29
Total	40820	100	30407	100	29228	100	32705	100

Population development
Year	2004	2005	2006	2007	2008	2009	2010	2011	2012	2013	2014
Population	29,424	29,908	29,816	29,511	29,478	29,221	29,395	29,810	30,055	30,274	31,256
