= 100 great Estonians of the 20th century =

List of notable Estonians

100 great Estonians of the 20th century is a list of notable Estonians compiled in 1999 by Eesti Entsüklopeediakirjastus, Eesti Päevaleht, National Library of Estonia, Radio Kuku, and TV3.

The list includes 20 scientists, 20 social figures, 15 writers, 13 in theater, film and journalism, 12 musicians, 10 artists, and 10 sportsmen. The best known scientist of the century was semiotician Juri Lotman, politician was Lennart Meri, musician Gustav Ernesaks, and sportsman was chess grandmaster Paul Keres.

100 great Estonians of the 20th century in alphabetical order:

- Amandus Adamson (1855–1929) sculptor and painter
- Ants Antson (1938–2015) speed skater
- Ants Eskola (1908–1989) actor
- Artur Alliksaar (1923–1966) poet
- August Gailit (1891–1960) writer
- Betti Alver (1906–1989) poet
- Ernst Jaakson (1905–1998) diplomat
- Gustav Ernesaks (1908–1993) composer and choir conductor
- Heino Eller (1887–1970) composer and composition teacher
- Ita Ever (1931–2023) actress
- Jaan Einasto (1929–) astrophysicist
- Jakob Hurt (1839–1906) theologian
- Johannes Aavik (1880–1973) philologist
- Johannes Hint (1914–1985) scientist
- Jüri Arrak (1936–) painter
- Kaarel Eenpalu (1888–1942) head of state, died in prison camps in Soviet Union
- Miina Härma (1864–1941) composer
- Paul Ariste (1905–1990) linguist
- Pavel Bogovski (1919–1995) oncologist and pathologist
- Jüri Järvet (1919–1995) actor
- Neeme Järvi (1937–) conductor
- Fred Jüssi (1935–) biologist
- Tõnu Kaljuste (1953–) conductor
- Siim Kallas (1948–2026) politician
- Edgar Kant (1902–1978) geographer and economist
- Tunne Kelam (1936–) Estonian politician and Member of the European Parliament
- Paul Keres (1916–1975) chess grandmaster
- August Kitzberg (1855–1927) writer
- Eri Klas (1939–2016) conductor
- Paul Kogerman (1891–1951) chemist
- Jaan Koort (1883–1935) sculptor and painter
- Johannes Kotkas (1915–1998) Greco-Roman wrestler
- Jaan Kross (1920–2007) writer
- Eerik Kumari (1912–1984) doctor of biology
- Julius Kuperjanov (1894–1914) military officer
- Mart Laar (1960–) politician and historian
- Johan Laidoner (1884–1953) general and statesman
- Ants Laikmaa (1866–1942) painter
- Juhan Liiv (1864–1913) poet
- Heino Lipp (1922–2006) decathlete
- Endel Lippmaa (1930–2015) academic and politician
- Juri Lotman (1922-1993) cultural historian
- Georg Lurich (1876–1920) Greco-Roman wrestler
- Oskar Luts (1866–1953) writer
- Rein Maran (1931–) director and cinematographer
- Alo Mattiisen (1961–1996) composer
- Lennart Meri (1929–2006) film director and second President of Estonia
- Felix Moor (1903–1955), journalist and actor
- Harri Moora (1900–1968) archaeologist
- Konrad Mägi (1878–1925) painter
- Erki Nool (1970–) sportsman, politician
- Ülo Nugis (1944–2011) politician and economist
- Pent Nurmekund (1936–1996), linguist, philologist, polyglot, Orientalist and poet
- Evald Okas (1915–2011) painter, known for nudes
- Ernst Öpik (1893–1985) astronomer and astrophysicist
- Karl Orviku (1920–1975) geologist
- Georg Ots (1908–1987) singer and actor
- Kristjan Palusalu (1908–1987) wrestler, Olympic winner
- Voldemar Panso (1920–1977) actor, stage director and theatre pedagogue
- Valdo Pant (1928–1976) journalist
- Erast Parmasto (1928-2012)
- Juhan Peegel (1919–2007) journalist, linguist, academic and writer
- Paul Pinna (1884–1949) actor, stage director and theatre pedagogue
- Johan Pitka (1872–1944?) military officer during the Estonian War of Independence
- Jaan Poska (1866–1920) barrister and politician
- Ludvig Puusepp (1875–1942) first professor of neurosurgery
- Arvo Pärt (1935–) composer of religious music
- Konstantin Päts (1874–1956) politician
- Kristjan Raud (1865–1943) painter
- Anna Raudkats (1886–1965) folk dance teacher and cataloger
- Anto Raukas (1935–2021) geologist, academic and sportsman
- Liina Reiman (1891–1961) actress
- Günther Reindorff (1899–1974) graphic designer
- Karl Ristikivi (1912–1977) writer
- Hando Runnel (1938–) poet and publisher
- Arnold Rüütel (1928–) The last Chairman of the Presidium of the Supreme Soviet of the Estonian SSR
- Erika Salumäe (1962–) track bicycle racer
- Edgar Savisaar (1950–2022) politician
- Arnold Seppo (1917–1980) surgeon and traumatologist
- Anton Starkopf (1889–1966) sculptor
- Toomas Sulling (1940–) cardiac and vascular surgeon
- Jaan Talts (1944–) weightlifter
- A. H. Tammsaare (1878–1940) writer
- Andres Tarand (1940–) former Prime Minister of Estonia
- Enn Tarto (1938–2021) leading dissident during Soviet Union occupation
- Rudolf Tobias (1873–1918) composer
- Veljo Tormis (1930–2017) composer
- Friedebert Tuglas (1886–1971) writer
- Jaan Tõnisson (1868–1941) State Elder
- Jüri Uluots (1890–1945) attorney and journalist
- Marie Under (1883–1980) poet
- Jaak Uudmäe (1954–) long jumper at Olympics
- Voldemar Vaga (1899–1999) art and architecture historian
- Raimond Valgre (1913–1949) composer
- Juhan Viiding (1948–1995) poet and actor
- Eduard Viiralt (1898–1954) graphic artist
- Eduard Vilde (1965–1933) writer
- Jüri Vilms (1889–1918) member of the Estonian Salvation Committee
- Vaino Väljas (1931–2024) Soviet politician
