= Soldatov =

Soldatov (masculine; Russian: Солдатов) and Soldatova (feminine; Russian: Солдатова) is a Russian surname, derived from the word "солдат" (soldier).

== People ==
- Aleksandra Soldatova (born 1998), Russian rhythmic gymnast
- Aleksey Soldatov (born 1951), Russian scientist, businessman, scientific functionary and civil servant
- Aleksandr Soldatov (1915–1999), Soviet diplomat and civil servant
- Andrei Soldatov (born 1975), Russian investigative journalist
- Irina Soldatova (1965–2002), Russian archer
- Julia Soldatova (born 1981), Russian figure skater
- Mikhail Soldatov (1926–1997), Soviet bodyguard
- Oleg Soldatov (born 1963), Russian conductor
- Sergei Soldatov, multiple persons
- Vladimir Soldatov (1875–1941), Russian and Soviet ichthyologist, zoologist
