= Tallinn bus station =

Bus station in Tallinn, Estonia

Coordinates: 59°25′38.7″N 24°46′25.24″E

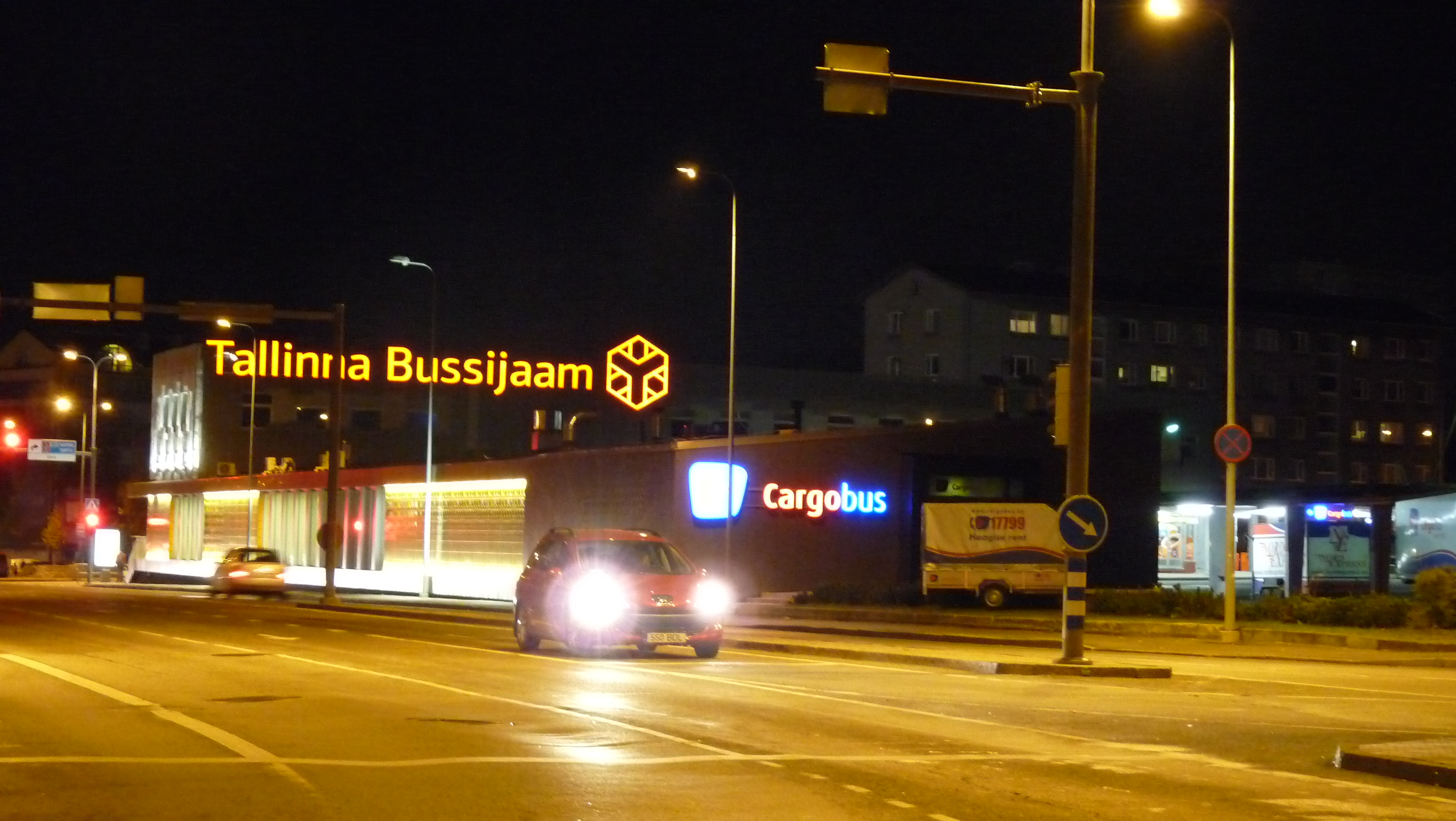
- Tallinn bus station in 2013

General information
- Location: Kesklinn, Tallinn; Estonia

History
- Opened: 1959

Services
Tram services
| Preceding station | Trams in Tallinn | Following station |
|---|---|---|
| Lubja towards Suur-Paala | 2 | Keskturg towards Kopli |
| Lubja towards Suur-Paala | 4 | Keskturg towards Tondi |
Location

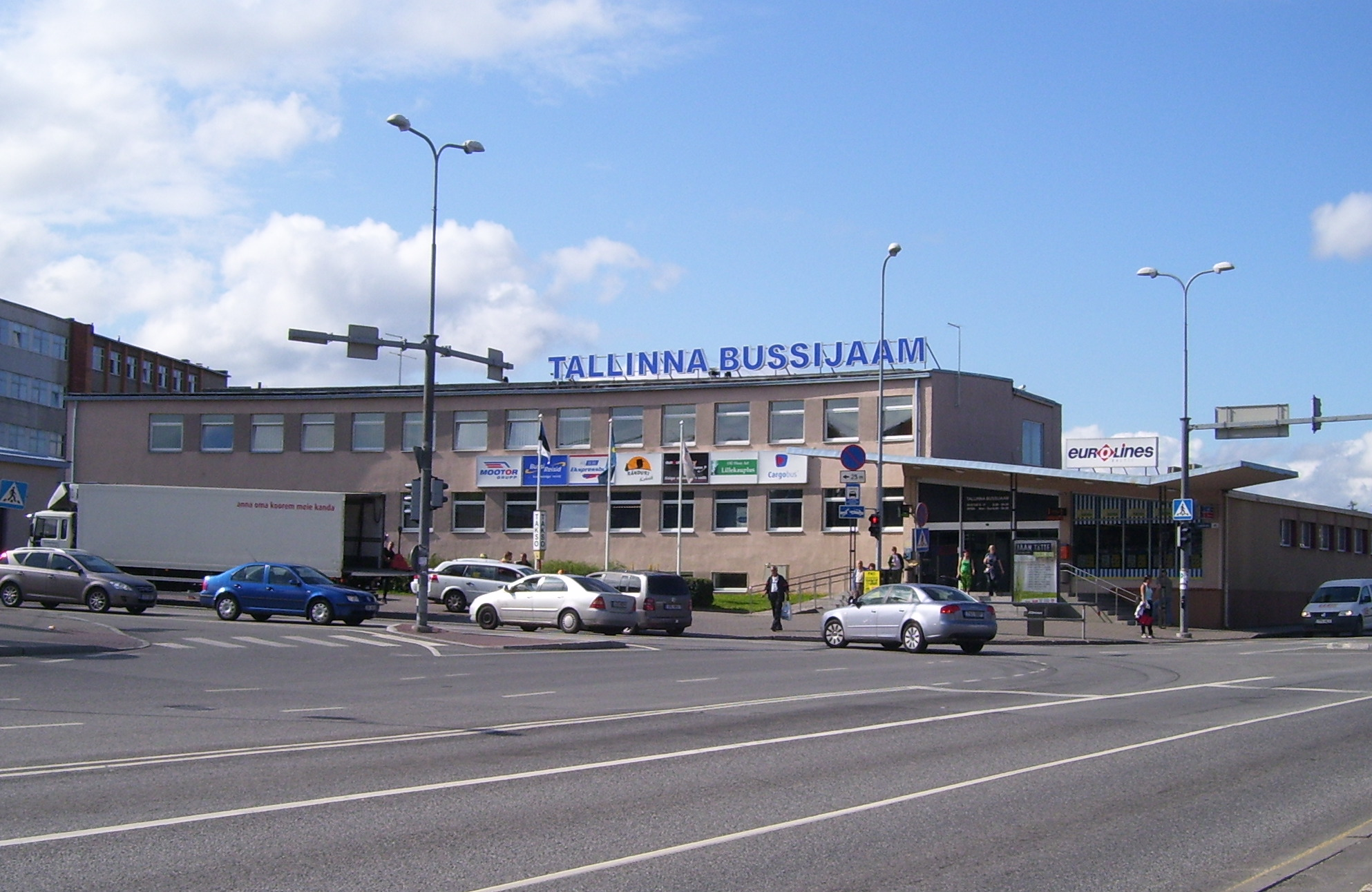
Tallinn bus station in 2009, before the renovation

The Tallinn bus station (Estonian: Tallinna bussijaam) is the main long-distance bus station of Tallinn, Estonia. The bus station is located in the southeastern part of the city centre (Kesklinn District), in Juhkentali neighbourhood. The bus station is managed by Mootor Grupp AS. The address is Lastekodu tänav 46.

== History ==
The long-distance bus station moved to its current location in 1959, from the Viru Square (then called the Stalin Square). The first station building was a one-story wooden building. The current building was built in 1965 to celebrate the 25th anniversary of the Estonian SSR. In 2012 a major renovation of the building took place.

== Neighbourhood of the station ==
The Tallinn bus station is surrounded by Lastekodu, Odra and Juhkentali streets. Opposite the bus station (Juhkentali 48) is a park. To the south are the alcohol producer Liviko's historical manufacturing buildings.

== Transport connections ==
The Tallinn bus station is served by a city lines (TLT) stop Bussijaam ("bus station"). The stops around the station are served by the lines nr 17 (J.Sütiste tee – bussijaam), 23 (Kadaka – bussijaam), 47 (Väike-Õismäe – bussijaam) and 54 (Kurina – Estonia), as well as lines 2 (Mõigu – Reisisadam (A-terminal)), 15 (Sõjamäe - Viru keskus), 39 (Veerenni - Lasnamägi).

There is also a stop Bussijaam of the Tallinn tram network which serves lines nr 2 (Kopli - Suur-Paala) and 4 (Lennujaam - Tondi]).
