= Arnold Seppo =

Estonian surgeon

Arnold Seppo (31 December 1917, St. Petersburg Region – 19 April 1980, Tallinn) was an Estonian surgeon and traumatologist.

1941 he graduated from Leningrad I Medical Institute.

1941-1946 he was surgeon of 8th Estonian Rifle Corps.

From 1947 to 1949 he worked as a researcher at the Estonian Academy of Sciences, and at the same time was a surgeon at East Tallinn Central Hospital.1949-1956 he was lecturer at Tartu University and head of general surgery chair. 1957-1977 he was head of traumatology department of Tallinn Tõnismäe Hospital.

Since 1977 he was related to Metal Osteosynthesis Scientific Research Institute. From 1992 until the closing in 1994, this institute bore his name: A. Seppo Traumatology and Orthopaedic Centre.
