= Alexander Nevsky Cemetery =

Alexander Nevsky Cemetery may refer to:

- any cemetery related to St Alexander Nevsky Monastery, Sankt Petersburg, Russia
- Alexander Nevsky Cemetery, Tallinn, cemetery in Tallinn, Estonia
