= Toomas Sulling =

Estonian surgeon

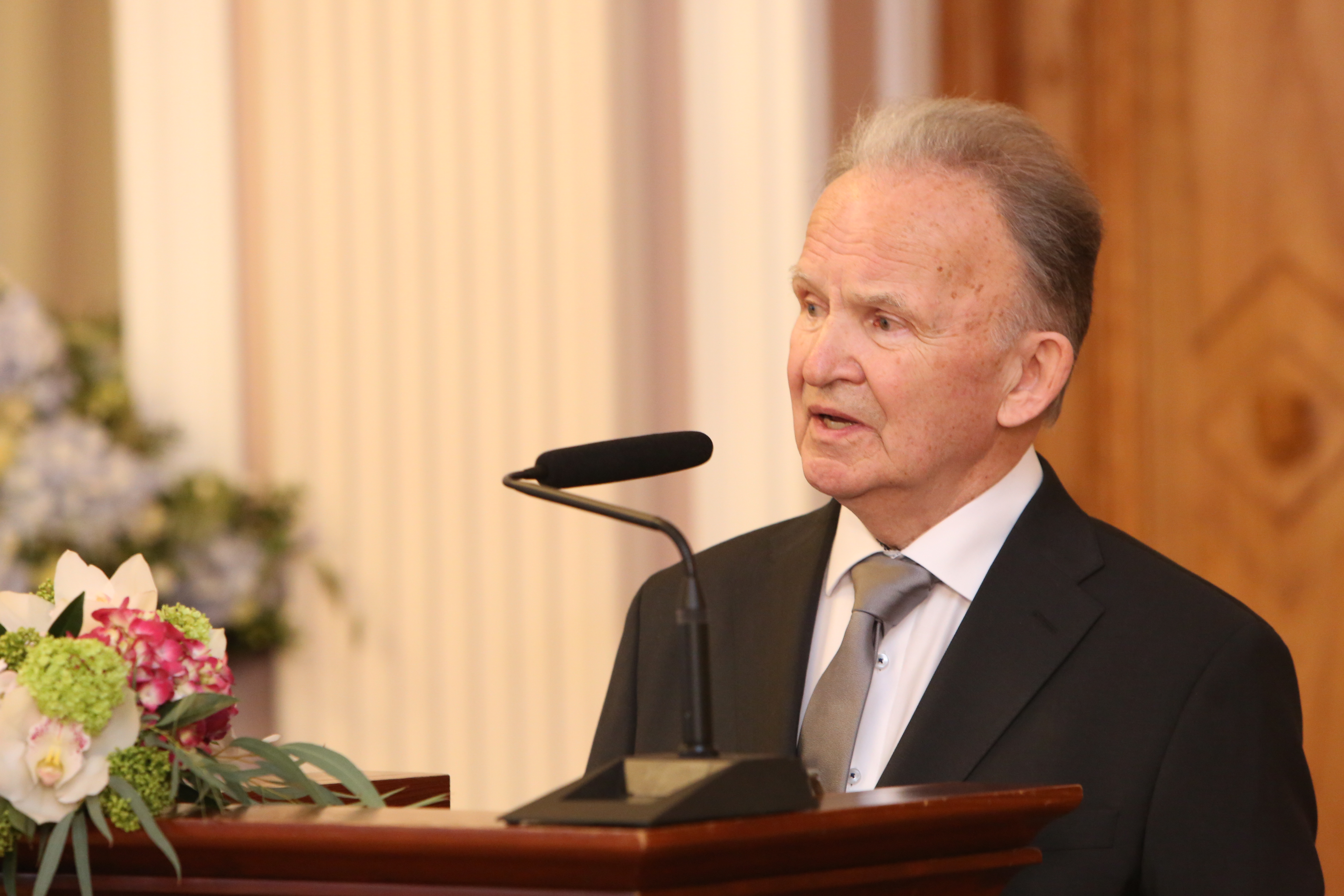
Toomas Sulling (2021)

Toomas Sulling (born 15 February 1940, in Tallinn) is an Estonian cardiovascular surgeon specializing in coronary artery bypass grafting. He is considered as the pioneer of coronary artery bypass surgery in Estonia.

In 1964 he graduated from the University of Tartu.

From 1979 to 1987 he was the head of cardiology and coronary surgery department of General and Molecular Pathology Institute.

From 1987 to 1995 he was the director of the Estonian Heart Centre (Estonian: Eesti Südamekeskus). In 1995, he became the head of the Clinic of Cardiovascular Surgery at Mustamäe Hospital (now North Estonia Medical Centre).

In 1999, he was voted one of the 100 greatest Estonians of the 20th century.

In 2001, president Lennart Meri awarded him the Order of the Estonian Red Cross, 1st class.
