= Nõmm =

Family name

Origin
- Language: Estonian
- Meaning: heath, moorland
- Region of origin: Estonia

Other names
- Related names: Nõmmik, Nõmme

Nõmm is an Estonian language surname meaning "heath" and "moorland" in the Estonian language.

As of 1 January 2024, 470 men and 523 women have the surname Aun in Estonia. Nõmm ranks 69th for men and 63rd for women in the distribution of surnames in Estonia. The surname Aun is the most common in Hiiu County, where 12.61 per 10,000 inhabitants of the county bear the surname.

Notable people bearing the surname Nõmm include:

- Brett Nõmm (born 1994), Estonian basketball player and coach
- Evald Nõmm (1906–1990), Estonian soldier, equestrian, veterinarian and professor
- Kaire Nõmm (born 1971), Estonian architect
- Karl-Romet Nõmm (born 1998), Estonian footballer
