= Pavel Bogovski =

Estonian medical scientist

Pavel Bogovski (Russian: Павел Александрович Боговский; 10 March 1919 Tartu – 8 March 2006) was an Estonian oncologist and anatomy pathologist.

He studied at the University of Tartu from 1937 to 1941, but then transferred because of the Second World War to Almaty Medical Institute in Kazakhstan, where he graduated in 1943. After the war he returned to Tartu to study for a Ph.D, which he was awarded in 1949.

From 1949 he worked at the Institute of Experimental and Clinical Medicine in Tallinn and was its director from 1974 to 1991. From 1977 he was the leader of the commission on Estonian medical terminology.

In 1993 he was elected a member of the Estonian Academy of Sciences. In 1999 he was awarded the Republic of Estonia science prize (lifework prize).
