= Sergei Soldatov =

Sergei Soldatov may refer to:

- Sergei Soldatov (dissident) (1933–2003), Estonian anti-Soviet dissident
- Sergei Soldatov (footballer, born 1970), Russian and Ukrainian footballer and current football coach
