= Salme Nõmmik =

Estonian economic geographer (1910–1988)

Salme Nõmmik, née Salme Mangelson (3 March 1910 – 21 September 1988), was an Estonian economic geographer and professor.

== Biography ==
Salme Mangelson was born in Vana-Põltsamaa parish, Viljandimaa, Estonia to a school teacher mother. In 1929, she graduated from Põltsamaa University High School and in 1933 from the Department of Economics at the Faculty of Law of University of Tartu (UT), where economic geography was taught by Edgar Kant. She married in 1934 and took the name Salme Nõmmik.

She joined the geography department as an assistant in 1946 and became a senior teacher in 1948. In 1956, she defended her candidacy letter at the Leningrad State University. There, she was elected an acting assistant professor, and in 1963 she was named an associate professor. In 1968, the Department of Economic Geography was created, which Nõmmik headed. In 1970, she defended her doctorate in Moscow and was elected a professor a year later. She was a staunch supporter of Kant, who has been described as the founder of economic geography in Estonia. Nõmmik became known as the "first professor of economic geography in Soviet Estonia."

=== Research ===
Because of political sensitivity about the teachings of economic geography, researchers found it problematic to discuss the subject with peers in the international scientific community, especially considering the limited communications available. At that time applied research produced by the Department of Geography concerned recommendations for the optimal placement of companies based on knowledge and innovations in the administrative system.

Nõmmik's research areas targeted socio-economic-geographical theory, including the regularities of the spatial organization of social reproduction, socio-economic complexes and settlement systems, and the improvement of the system of basic socio-economic-geographic concepts. Estonian researchers were the initiators of the establishment of the Tartu city laboratory (1968) and the founders of the Estonian Geographic Society (1955). Nõmmik was made an honorary member of the USSR Geographical Society (1985). She published 120 scientific works and more than 70 scientific articles.

=== Personal life ===
She was married in 1934 and had a son, physicist Riho Nõmmik, born in 1936. Salme Nõmmik died 21 September 1988, in Tartu, Estonia.

== Selected works ==
- Geographical position and administrative-territorial division of the territory of the Estonian SSR. Tartu, 1961
- Economic geography of the Estonian SSR I. Tartu, 1969
- Towards the development of settlement systems (co-author V. Murel). UT Ed. 341 (1974)
- Economic geography of the Estonian SSR. Tallinn, 1979
- Regional systems of settlements and complex territorial planning in the Estonian SSR (co-author V. Murel). Regional studies. Methods and analyses. Budapest, 1975
- Complex methodology in the territorial study of productive forces. Yearbook of the Estonian Geographical Society 1979 (1981)
- Spatial laws of society and socio-economic geography. UT Ed. 577 (1981)
- Modern geography: theoretical issues (co-author U. Mereste). 1984
- Socio-economic geography and its methods. Soviet geography today, 3. Social and economic geography. Moscow, 1984
- Die sozial-ökonomische Geographie und die Untersuchung von Raum–Zeit–Gesetzen der Gesellschaft. Petermanns Geographische Mitt. 2, 1986
- Socio-economic zoning (on the example of the Estonian SSR). Yearbook of the Estonian Geographical Society 22 (1987)
