= Siselinna Cemetery =

Cemetery in Tallinn, Estonia

Coordinates: 59.423°N 24.762°E

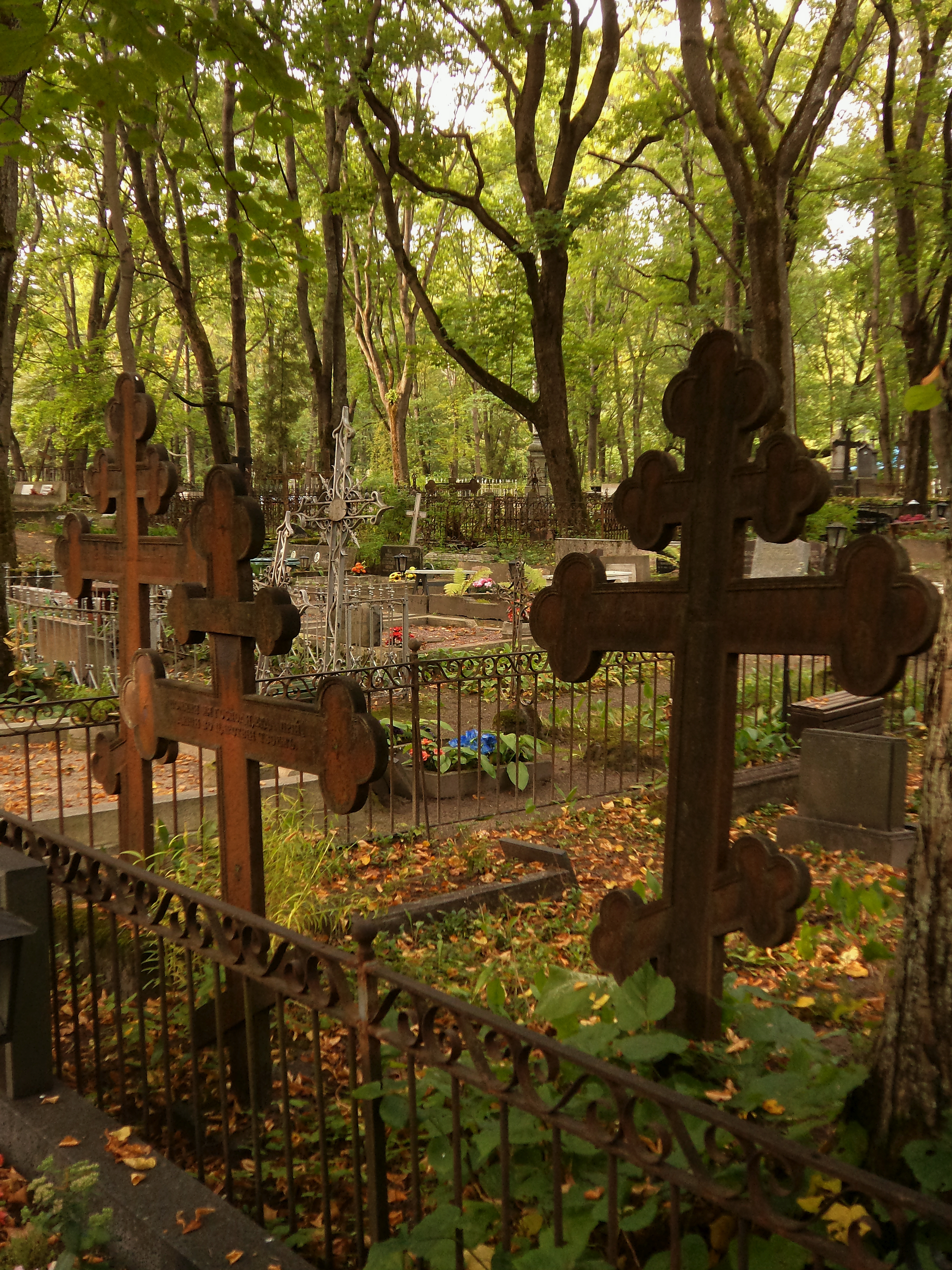
Siselinna Cemetery

Siselinna Cemetery (Estonian: Siselinna kalmistu) is a cemetery area in Juhkentali subdistrict, Tallinn, Estonia. Its area is 18.3 ha.

== Parts ==
- Alexander Nevsky Cemetery (established 1775)
- Cholera cemetery (19th century)
- Old Charles' Cemetery (established 1864)
