= Anto Raukas =

Estonian geologist (1935–2021)

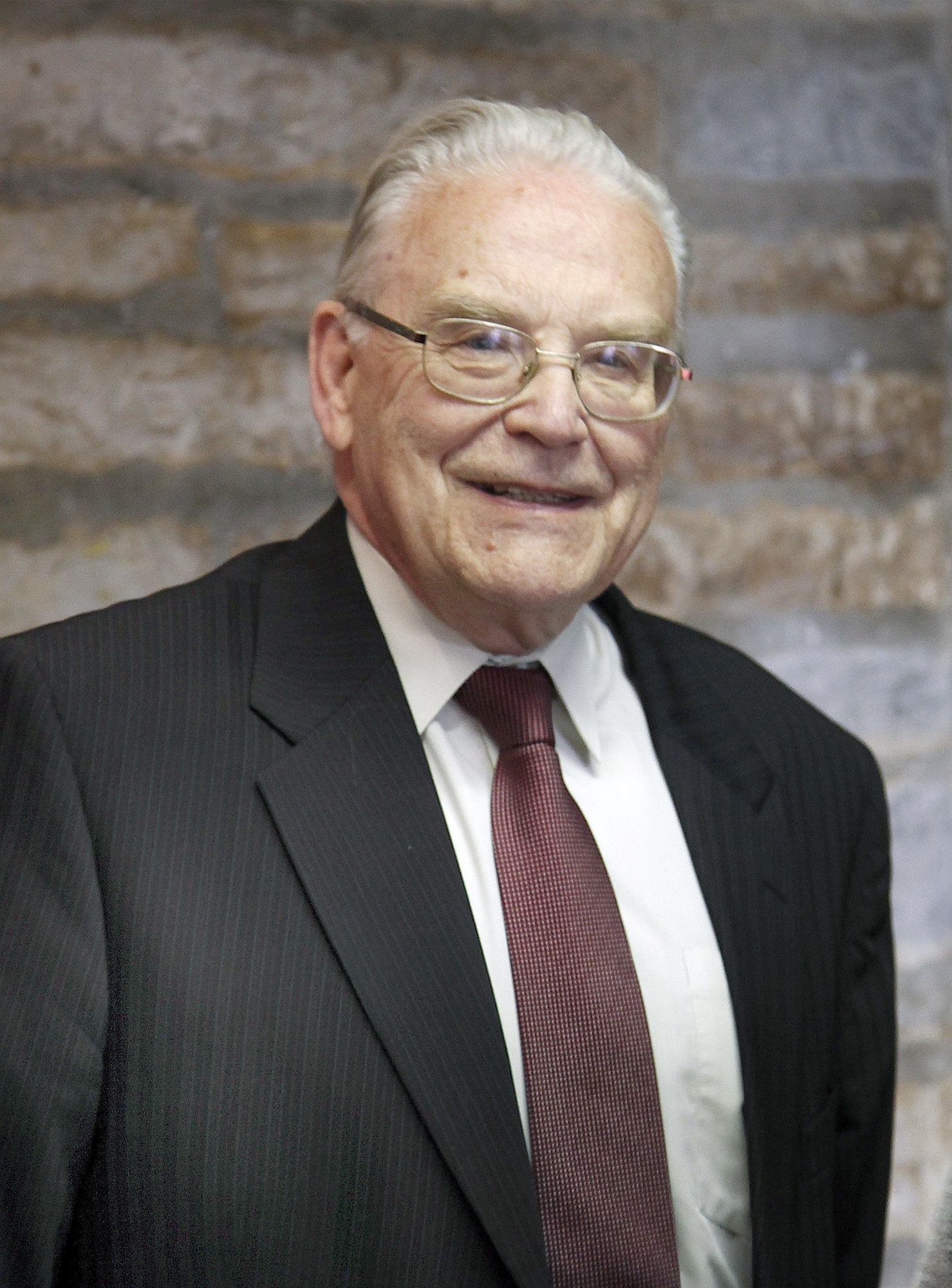
Anto Raukas (2013)

Anto Raukas (17 February 1935 – 19 April 2021) was an Estonian geologist and science organiser.

Raukas was born in Tartu. In 1958 he graduated from Tartu University.

Since 1958, he worked at the Institute of Geology of Estonian Academy of Sciences. Since 1993, he was professor at Estonian Maritime Academy and, from 1995, he was head of the chair of environment techniques.

In 1991, 1996, 2003, and 2015, he received the Republic of Estonia science prize.

== Memberships ==
- Estonian Academy of Sciences (since 1977)
- Royal Geographical Society (London) (since 1999)
- International Union for Quaternary Research (INQUA) (since 1999; honorary member)
