= Nõmmik =

Family name

Nõmmik is an Estonian surname. Notable people with the surname include:

- Salme Nõmmik (1910–1988), Estonian economic geographer and professor
- Sulev Nõmmik (1931–1992), Estonian actor and comedian
- Raivo Nõmmik (born 1977), Estonian footballer
