= Pavel Levitsky =

Russian admiral (1859–1938)

Pavel Levitsky Павел Левицкий
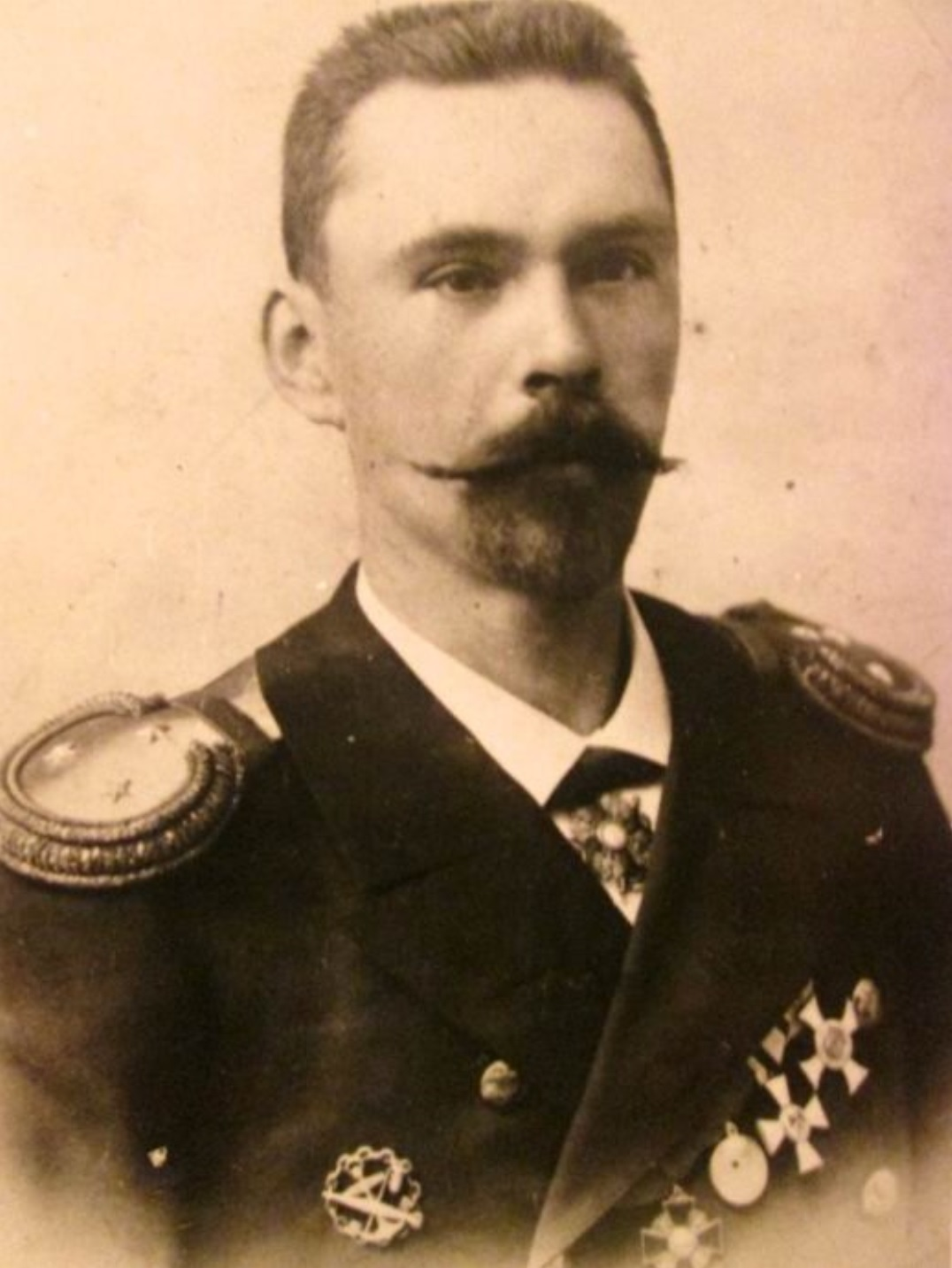
- Levitsky as a Lieutenant
- Born: 3 October 1859; Reval, Governorate of Estonia, Russian Empire
- Died: 31 July 1938 (aged 78); Tallinn, Harju County, Estonia
- Burial place: Alexander Nevsky Cemetery, Tallinn, Harju County, Estonia
- Education: Naval Cadet Corps
- Military career
- Allegiance: Russian Empire; Ukrainian People's Republic; Russian Republic
- Branch: Imperial Russian Navy; Navy of the Ukrainian People's Republic; White Army
- Service years: 1880–1938
- Rank: Vitse-admiral
- Commands: Zhemchug
- Conflicts: Russo-Japanese War; Battle of Tsushima; World War I; Russian Civil War

Pavel Pavlovich Levitsky (Russian: Па́вел Па́влович Леви́цкий; October 3, 1859 – July 31, 1938) was a Russian Vice Admiral of the Russo-Japanese War and the Russian Civil War. He was known for commanding the Zhemchug during the Battle of Tsushima.

== Biography ==
Levitsky was born on 30 October 1859 in Reval, the son of the commander of the steam frigate Smelyy Pavel Pavlovich Levitsky and Nadezhda Efimovna (née Kholostova), daughter of a merchant of the first guild from Reval. In 1880, he graduated from the Naval Cadet Corps, was appointed michman in 1881, and graduated from his naval mine classes in 1884. under the guidance of Alexander Stepanovich Popov. Levitsky received his first command on 23 April 1885, as he headed the Plotva and from 1896 to 1898 was the senior mine officer of the Vladimir Monomakh. He then became the senior officer of the Sissoi Veliky on 15 June 1898, before being promoted to Captain 2nd rank on 6 December 1899. On 4 February 1904 he received command of the Zhemchug as part of the Second Pacific Squadron. On 27 May he participated in the Battle of Tsushima and after the battle, as part of the detachment of Rear-Admiral Oskar Enkvist, took the cruiser to Manila. For distinction in service, he was awarded the Order of St. Anna, 2nd Class with swords.

On 6 December 1906 Levitsky was promoted to Captain 1st rank before becoming the Head of the Diving Training Unit on the Baltic Sea on 17 June 1907. In 1911, he became an officer of the Diving Officer Class and was promoted to Counter Admiral on 25 March 1912 for "distinction in service". During World War I, Levitsky commanded a submarine brigade on the Baltic Sea. Around this time period, Levitsky's command and order was described as:

Modest, simple, friendly to everyone and everyone, Pavel Pavlovich always carefully listened to the opinions and wishes of submarine commanders, allowed him to argue with himself and never abused the power granted to him. For these qualities, he enjoyed universal respect and earned the nickname "Papa" in the brigade, which he was always proud of. To this it should be added that he never tried to avoid danger and, although this was not at all required by his position, he always personally went on dives to great depths or on trials from which the boat risked not returning.

— Часовой No. 222–223, 1938, p. 16

On 23 March 1915 he was appointed to be under the Minister of the Navy, Ivan Grigorovich, supervised the construction of new submarines at the Baltic Sea on 18 January 1916 but after the October Revolution of 1917, he left for Kiev. Upon the outbreak of the Russian Civil War, he would serve at the Navy of the Ukrainian People's Republic before enlisting for the White Army. In September 1919, he left for Sevastopol where he was appointed head of the reserve officers of the Navy as well as receiving command of the ports of Yalta. Once the White Army began losing on all fronts however, Levitsky would flee with Pyotr Wrangel to Athens from Constantinople and lived in exile in Greece in November 1920. He later joined the Corps of Officers of the Imperial Army and Navy and was sent to Greece as a representative of Grand Duke Kirill Vladimirovich. He was the organizer and head of the Association of Former Russian Sailors in Estonia and was an honorary Member of the Seafarers Mutual Aid Fund. On 24 April 1930 he was promoted by Grand Duke Kirill Vladimirovich to Vice Admiral but Levitsky would die on 31 July 1938 in Tallinn and was buried at the Alexander Nevsky Cemetery.
