= Rein Maran =

Estonian cinematographer and film director

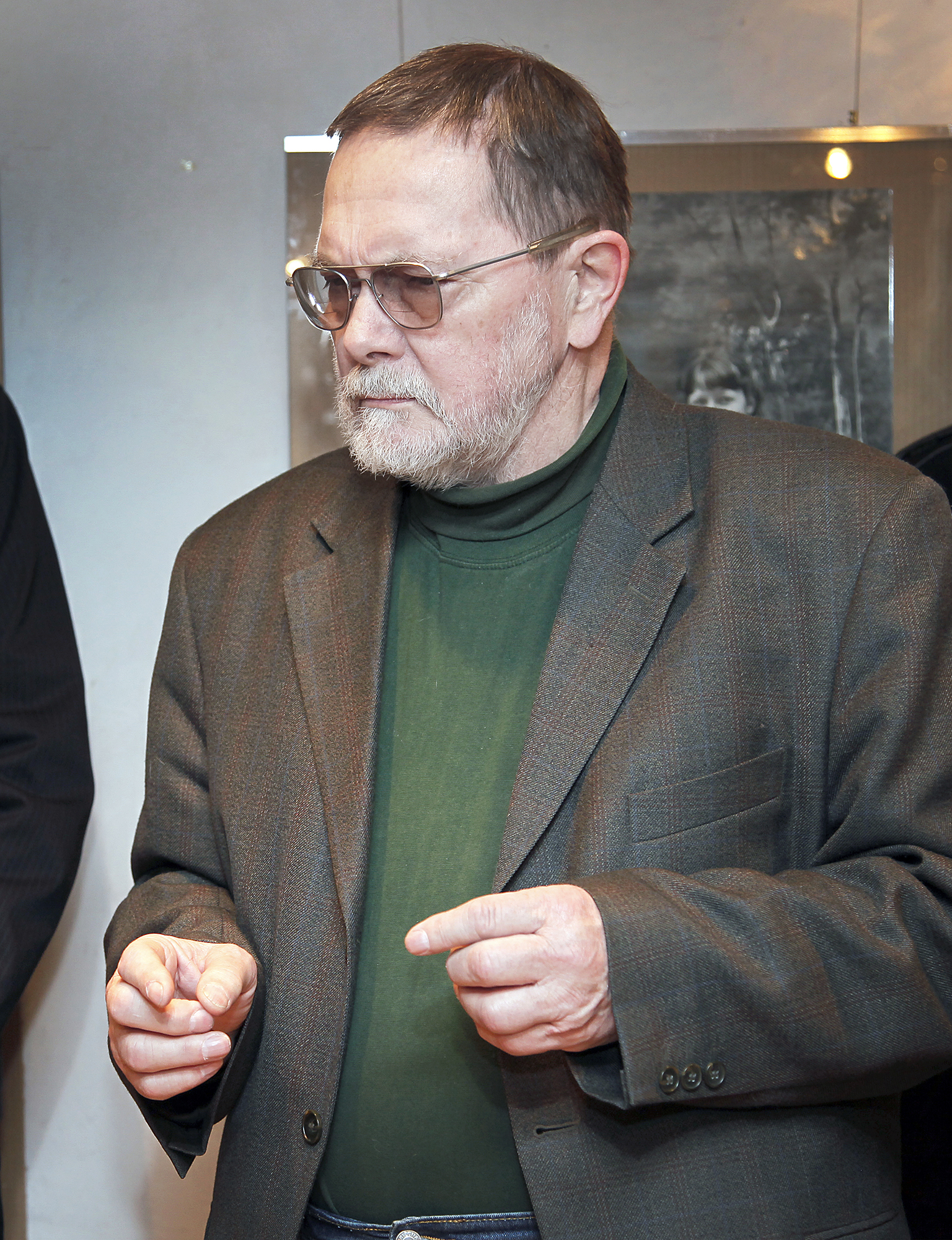
Rein Maran (2009)

Rein Maran (born 13 September 1931, in Tartu) is an Estonian cinematographer, director, and professor, most notable for teaching at Tallinn University. In 1972, he graduated from a cinematography school. In 1967 he joined Tallinnfilm, and later Eesti Telefilm. On his initiative, he established the Stodom photo group and, in 1989, the Tallinn Photo Club. He is part the Estonian Filmmakers Union, and was its chairman from 1989 to 1993. Since 1996, he teaches at Tallinn University, as part of the culture faculty of film and video training. He has created a series of films about nature, which is also reflected in folk traditions. Maran has also worked with other directors, movies, and documentaries. He is part of the 100 great Estonians of the 20th century.

== Acknowledgements ==
- 1984 Estonian SSR Great Sign of Nature
- 1986 Estonian SSR Honoured Art Figure
- 1987 Estonian SSR State Prize
- 1991 Eerik Kumari Award
- 1996 Estonian Cultural Endowment Lifetime Achievement Award
- 2000: 4th Class of the Order of the White Star (received 23 February 2000)
- 2011 Black Nights Film Festival Lifetime Achievement Award
