= Peter von Baranoff =

Baltic German military officer and statesman

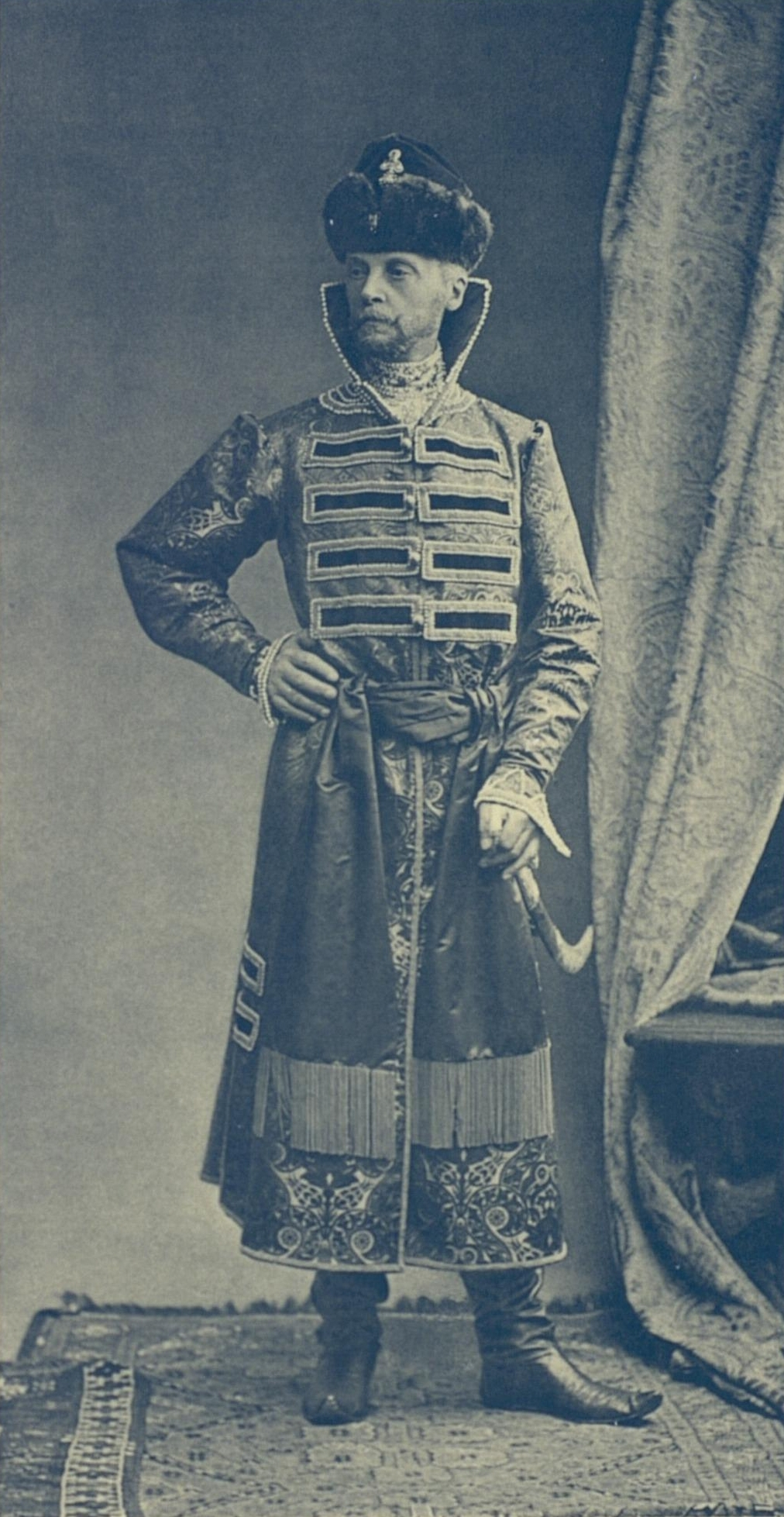
- Lieutenant-General Baranoff in 17th century Russian court clothes during the 1903 Ball.
- Born: 9 May [O.S. 27 April] 1843; Reval, Governorate of Estonia, Russian Empire
- Died: 22 December 1924 (aged 81); Tallinn, Harju County, Estonia
- Burial place: Alexander Nevsky Cemetery, Tallinn
- Children: 2
- Military career
- Allegiance: Russia
- Branch: Imperial Russian Army
- Service years: 1861–1917
- Rank: General of the Cavalry
- Commands: 1st Sumy Hussar Regiment; Her Majesty’s Ulan Guards Regiment; 1st brigade, 2nd Guards Cavalry Division
- Conflicts: January Uprising; Russo-Turkish War; World War I

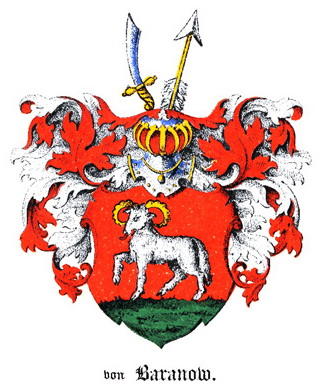
Coat of arms

Peter Paul Alexander von Baranoff (Russian: Пётр Петро́вич Бара́нов, romanized: Pyotr Petrovich Baranov; 9 May [O.S. 27 April] 1843 – 22 December 1924) was a Baltic German military officer and statesman. During the First World War, Baranoff was known for his investigations, most notably his investigation of fellow general Paul von Rennenkampf's actions during the Battle of Łódź.

== Biography ==
=== Origin ===
Peter was born in 9 May [O.S. 27 April] 1843 in Reval in the Governorate of Estonia (present-day Tallinn, Estonia), to Peter Hermann von Baranoff and Marie Louise Simplicie Pauline von Nicolay (ru).

Peter was from the Baltic German and Swedish noble Baranoff family of Swedish and Russian descent. The Baranoffs was originally Russian boyar who entered Swedish service after Estonia was ceased to Sweden under the conclusion of the Treaty of Teusina at the end of the Russo-Swedish War From 1590 to 1595. And many of them, quickly adapted to the Germanic traditions, converted to Lutheranism, and quickly became Baltic German subjects, including the Baranoffs, which was headed by four brothers: Voin, Fyodor, Kasyan and Menshik Baranov, who all changed their surname from Baranov to Baranoff to be better suited into Germanic names. The descendants of Voin and Fyodor quickly died out in the late-17th Century, while the descendants of Kasyan survived until the late-19th Century. The descendants of Menshik, who Peter was directly descended from, are still alive. The family was enrolled into Swedish nobility in 1666. In 1745, the Estonian high count gave an appeal the "Attestatum nobilitaris", that under the conclusion "that from 1592 the Baranoff family was to be brought under local nobility". So the family was enrolled into the Estonian Knighthood in that same year and the family was also enrolled into the Livonian and Oesel Knighthoods (de) following the years 1830 and 1843 simultaneously.

Peter belonged to the Arroküll-Waetz branch, a subdivided branch of the family founded by Peter's great-grandfather Peter Karl von Baranoff, who was married to Johanna Juliane von Hastfer (de). Some of the most famous members of the Baranoffs also belonged to this branch, including Peter's uncles Johann, Nikolai, Paul von Baranoff, who were all high-ranking Russian military officers and statesmans.

On his mother's side was the Nicolays, his mother's father was Paul von Nicolay, who was the son of the famous German poet Ludwig Heinrich von Nicolay, making Peter von Baranoff the great-grandson of him.

=== Family ===
Baranoff had four siblings. He himself was married to Olga Valerianovna Bibikova (1846–1933), they had two children, Olga (1883–1972) and Peter von Baranoff (1885–1973), who was a captain in the army and participant of the First World War.

== Honours and awards ==
=== Domestic ===
- Order of St. Anna, 4th class (1863)
- Order of St. Anna, 3rd class (1872)
- Golden Weapon "For Bravery" (11.4.1878)
- Order of St Vladimir, 4th class with swords and a bow (1878)
- Order of St. Stanislaus, 2nd class with swords (1878)
- Order of St. Anna, 2nd class (1881)
- Order of St Vladimir, 3rd class (1886)
- Order of St. Stanislaus, 1st class (1894)
- Order of St. Anna, 1st class (1898)
- Order of St Vladimir, 2nd class (1905)
- Order of the White Eagle (1907)
- Order of St. Alexander Nevsky with diamond marks (16.6.1911, diamond marks on 6.12.1915)

=== Foreign ===
- Austria-Hungary:
  - Order of Franz Joseph, Knight class (1874)
  - Order of the Iron Crown (Austria), Knight first class (1897)
- Kingdom of Romania:
  - Cross "For crossing the Danube" (ru) (1877)
- Kingdom of Prussia:
  - Order of the Red Eagle, 2nd class (1881)
  - Order of the Crown, 1st class (1898)
- Grand Duchy of Mecklenburg-Schwerin:
  - Order of the Griffon
