= East Tallinn Central Hospital =

Hospital in Tallinn, Estonia

Coordinates: 59°25′37.37″N 24°45′20.39″E

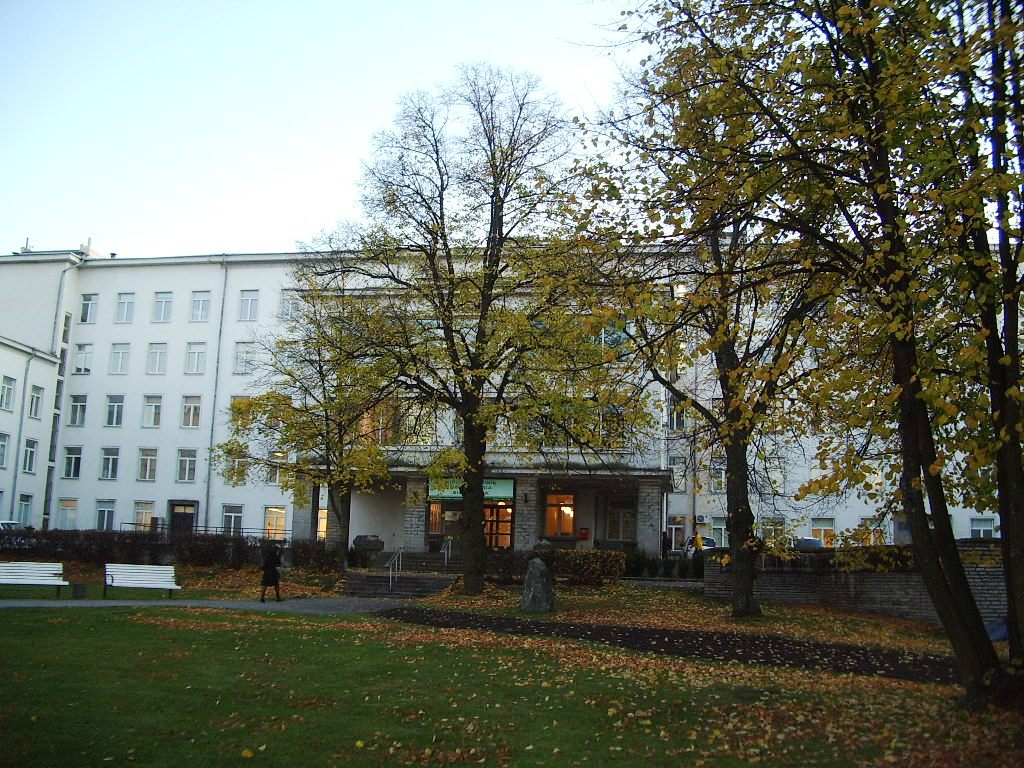

Geography
- Location: Tallinn, Harjumaa, Estonia

History
- Founded: 23 August 2001

Links
- Website: www.itk.ee/en
- Lists: Hospitals in Estonia

East Tallinn Central Hospital (Estonian: Ida-Tallinna Keskhaigla) is a hospital located in Tallinn, Estonia in the Veerenni subdistrict, on Ravi 18 street.
