= Alexander Nevsky Cemetery, Tallinn =

Cemetery in Tallinn, Estonia

Alexander Nevsky Cemetery
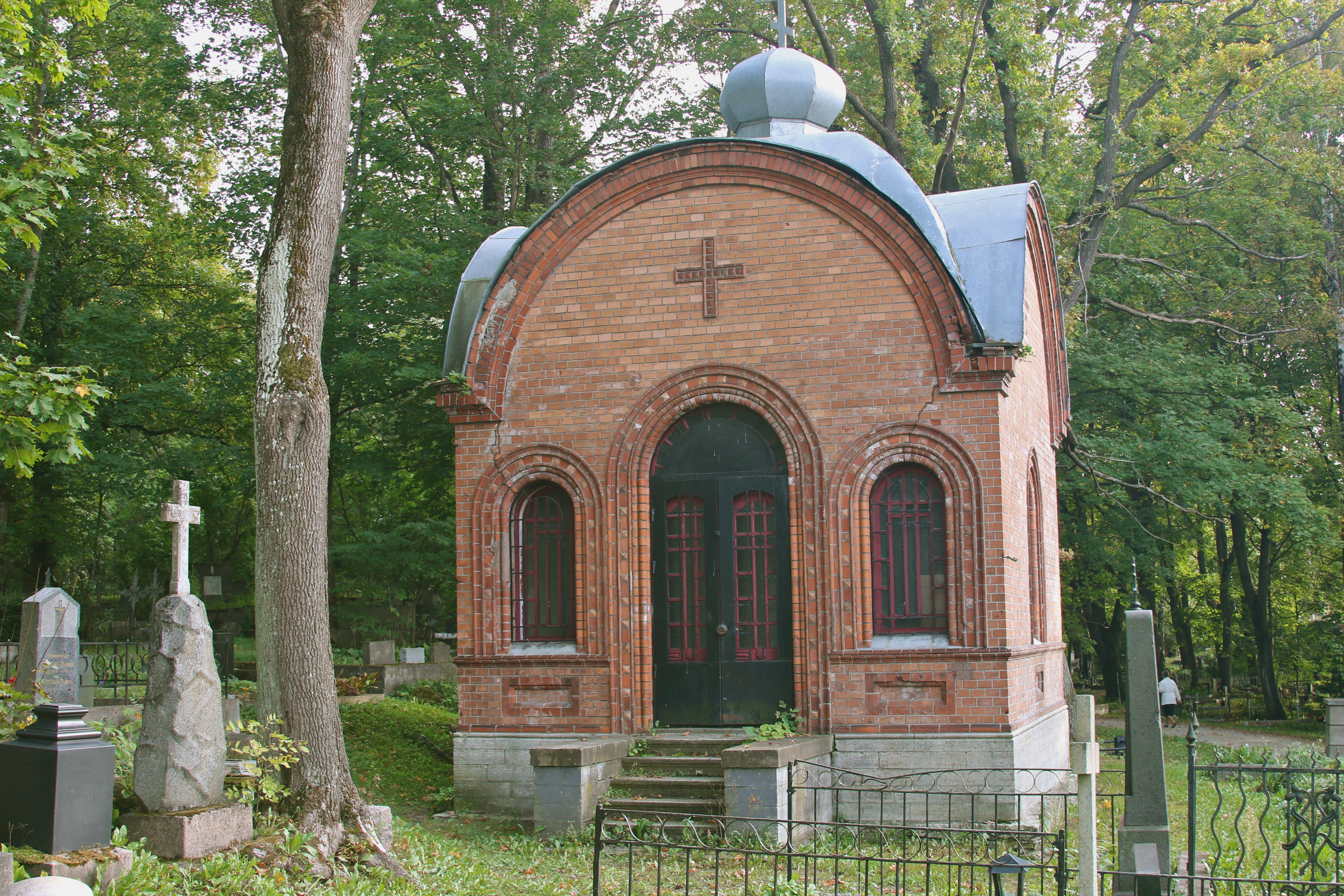
- Interactive map of Alexander Nevsky Cemetery

Details
- Established: 1775
- Location: Tallinn
- Country: Estonia
- Coordinates: 59°25′25″N 24°45′45″E
- Owned by: Estonian Orthodox Church of the Moscow Patriarchate
- Size: 13.01 ha (32.1 acres)

Alexander Nevsky Cemetery (Estonian: Aleksander Nevski kalmistu) is a cemetery in the Juhkentali subdistrict of Tallinn, Estonia; it is part of Siselinna Cemetery. The cemetery is named after nearby Alexander Nevsky Cathedral.

The cemetery was established in 1775.

All important local Orthodox leaders are buried in this cemetery. In addition, lower clergymen, military men, and civil officials are buried in this cemetery.

== Burials ==
- Vello Agori (1894–1944), caricaturist
- Jaan Arder (1952–2014), singer
- Peter von Baranoff (1843–1924), military officer
- Vladimir Gorbatovsky (1851–1924), Imperial Russian Army general
- Erast Hiatsintov (1858–1910), politician
- Pavel Levitsky (1859–1938), military officer
- Aleksander Pallas (1887–1939), politician
- Voldemar Päts (1902–1942), cinematographer
- Jaan Poska (1866–1920), politician
- Igor Severyanin (1887–1941), poet
- Arvi Siig (1938–1999), poet
- Sergei Soldatov (1933–2003), dissident
- Roman Steinberg (1900–1939), wrestler
- Edgar de Wahl (1867–1948), mathematics and physics teacher, reinterred at Pajusi manor cemetery
