= List of hospitals in Estonia =

This is a list of hospitals in Estonia.

Name	Location (county, city)	Further info	Image
East Tallinn Central Hospital	Harju County, Tallinn		
Elva Hospital	Tartu County, Elva		
Läänemaa Hospital	Lääne County, Haapsalu	Earlier Haapsalu Hospital	
Haapsalu Neurological Rehabilitation Center	Lääne County, Haapsalu		
Hiiu Oncology Center	Harju County, Tallinn		
Ida-Viru Central Hospital, Kohtla-Järve			
Jõgeva Hospital, Jõgeva			
Jõhvi Hospital, Jõhvi			
Järvamaa Hospital, Paide			
Kallavere Hospital, Maardu			
Keila Hospital, Keila			
Kuressaare Hospital, Kuressaare			
Mustamäe Hospital	Harju County, Tallinn		
North Estonia Medical Centre (Mustamäe Hospital)	Harju County, Tallinn		
Narva Hospital, Narva			
North Estonian Blood Center	Harju County, Tallinn		
Pelgulinn Maternity Home	Harju County, Tallinn		
Põlva Hospital, Põlva			
Pärnu Hospital, Pärnu			
Rakvere Hospital, Rakvere			
Rapla County Hospital, Rapla			
Räpina Hospital, Räpina			
Seewald mental hospital	Harju County, Tallinn		
Seli Health Centre	Rapla County, Seli	Owned and managed by Ministry of Defence	
Skin and Venereal Disease Center	Harju County, Tallinn		
South Estonian Hospital, Võru			
Tallinn Diaconal Hospital of EELC	Harju County, Tallinn		
Tallinn Children's Hospital	Harju County, Tallinn		
Tallinn Tõnismäe Hospital	Harju County, Tallinn		
Tapa Hospital, Tapa			
Tartu Psychiatric Hospital	Tartu County, Tartu		
Tartu University Hospital (Maarjamõisa Hospital)	Tartu County, Tartu		
Valga Hospital, Valga			
Viimsi Hospital, Haabneeme			
Viljandi Hospital, Viljandi			
West Tallinn Central Hospital	Harju County, Tallinn		
Wismari Hospital	Harju County, Tallinn		
