= Valdo Pant =

Estonian journalist

Valdo Pant (21 January 1928, Valgjärve Parish – 30 July 1976, Tallinn) was an Estonian journalist.

1940s he studied at Tartu Teachers' Seminar. In 1944 he was mobilised to the German army.

1948-1966 he was Estonian Radio and since 1966 Estonian Television reporter and commentator.

He was related to the creation or directing radio programmes or TV series like "Päevakaja", "RAMETO", "Today 25 Years Ago".

1967 he got Estonian Journalists' Union prize.
