= Sergei Soldatov (dissident) =

Estonian freedom fighter

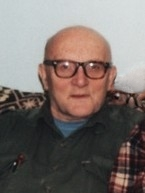
Sergei Soldatov

Sergei Soldatov (24 June 1933 Narva – 24 January 2003 Tallinn) was one of the founders of anti-Soviet dissident movement in Estonia.

Soldatov was born into a Russian Estonian family, he finished high school in Jõhvi and the Leningrad University of Technology. He worked in a number of factories in Tallinn and became a lecturer at the Tallinn Polytechnic Institute.

In early 1970s, Soldatov participated in dissident organisation Estonian Democratic Movement and was editor of underground newspapers. Among others, he cooperated with Tunne Kelam. As an ethnic Russian, Soldatov also had connections with dissident circles in Russia, and was one of the authors of the programme of the Democratic Movement of the Soviet Union in Russian.

Hiding himself underground since the 1974 arrest of Kalju Mätik, Mati Kiirend and Artjom Juskevitš, the KGB managed to arrest him in 1975. Soldatov was imprisoned in prison camps of Mordovia for six years. Soon after being released in 1981, he and his wife Lyudmila were expelled from the USSR. They settled in West Germany, where Sergei (thanks to Alexander Solzhenitsyn's recommendation) got the job of journalist for the Radio Liberty. For many years, he arranged broadcasts in Estonian.

Sergei Soldatov remained critical of the developments in post-Soviet Estonia, where he returned to in 2000. He died in Tallinn and was buried at the Alexander Nevsky Cemetery, Tallinn.
