= Mikhail Soldatov =

Soldatov (right) guarding Saddam Hussein in Saint Petersburg in 1973

Mikhail Petrovich Soldatov (Russian: Михаил Петрович Солдатов, 16 October 1926 – 20 October 1997) was a Soviet KGB officer who served as a bodyguard of Soviet and foreign leaders including Nikita Khrushchev and Leonid Brezhnev.

== Biography ==
During World War II Soldatov worked at the Moscow vacuum tube factory and after that enlisted to the KGB. He was assigned to the personal guard of Semyon Budyonny and soon married his secretary, Lida; they had a daughter Lena (born 1959) and son Aleksandr, who also became a high-profile bodyguard.

In 1956 Soldatov became a personal bodyguard of Nikita Khrushchev. In 1961, when Khrushchev arrived at the Vienna train station, someone threw a metallic cylinder resembling a grenade at Khrushchev's feet. Soldatov jumped and covered the object with his body, ready for explosion, but it was just a capsule with a personal letter to Khrushchev.

After Khrushchev was removed from power in 1964, Soldatov was assigned to guard Leonid Brezhnev, as well as other Soviet and foreign leaders, including Erich Honecker, Dmitry Polyansky, Saddam Hussein and one of the princes of Laos. He retired in 1980, aged 54.
