= Juhkentali =

Subdistrict of Tallinn, Estonia

Coordinates: 59°25′30.35″N 24°46′10.33″E

- Subdistrict of Tallinn
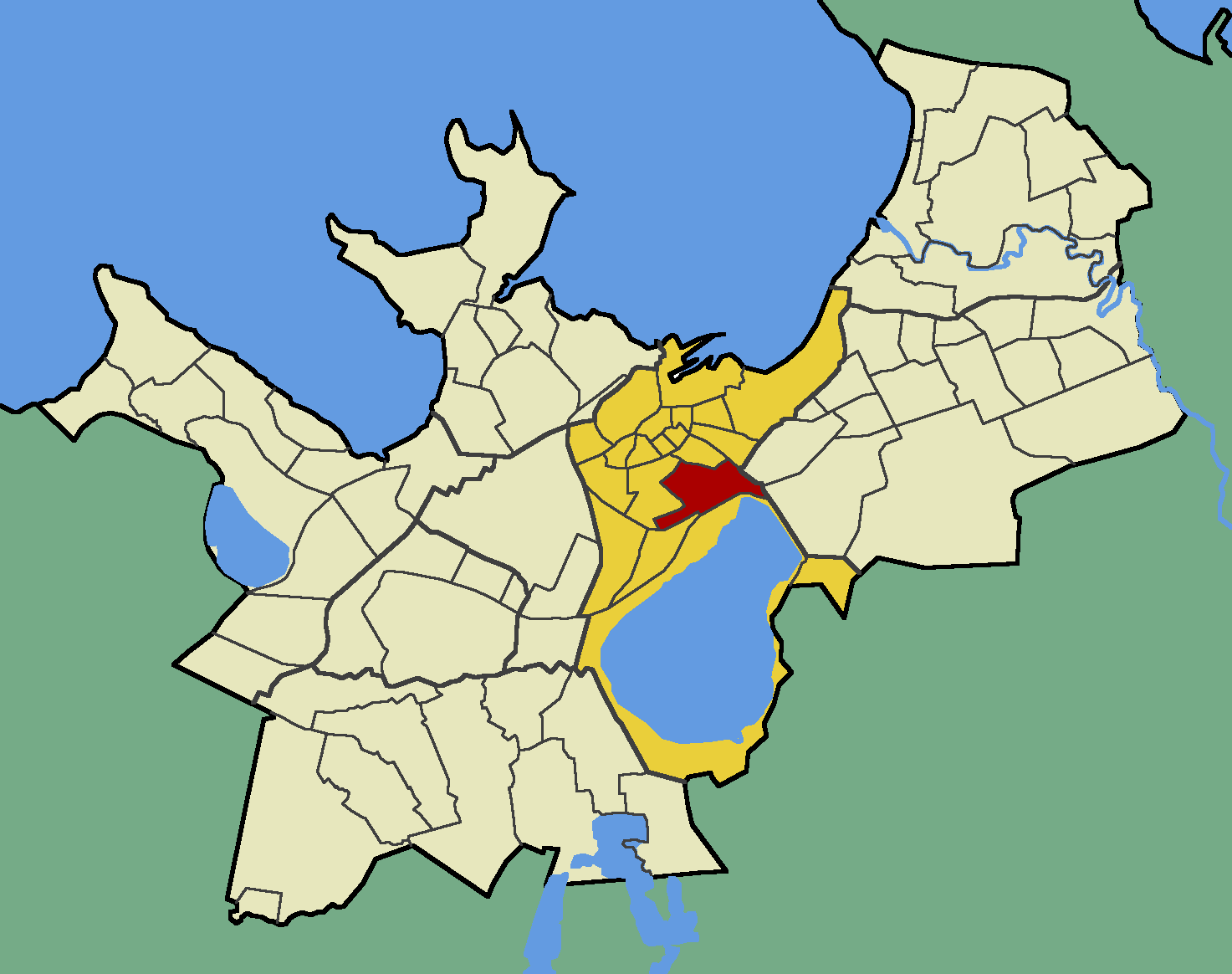
- Juhkentali within the district of Kesklinn (Midtown).
- Country: Estonia
- County: Harju County
- City: Tallinn
- District: Kesklinn

Population (01.01.2015)
  - Total: 1,221

Juhkentali is a subdistrict (Estonian: asum) in the district of Kesklinn (Midtown), Tallinn, the capital of Estonia. It has a population of 1,221 (As of 1 January 2015).

== History ==
Pleekmäe, a suburb (vorstadt), which located on the shore of the Härjapea, was first mentioned in 1536 as Bleke. The subdistrict nowadays known as Juhkentali, was passed by the Härjapea.

== Gallery ==
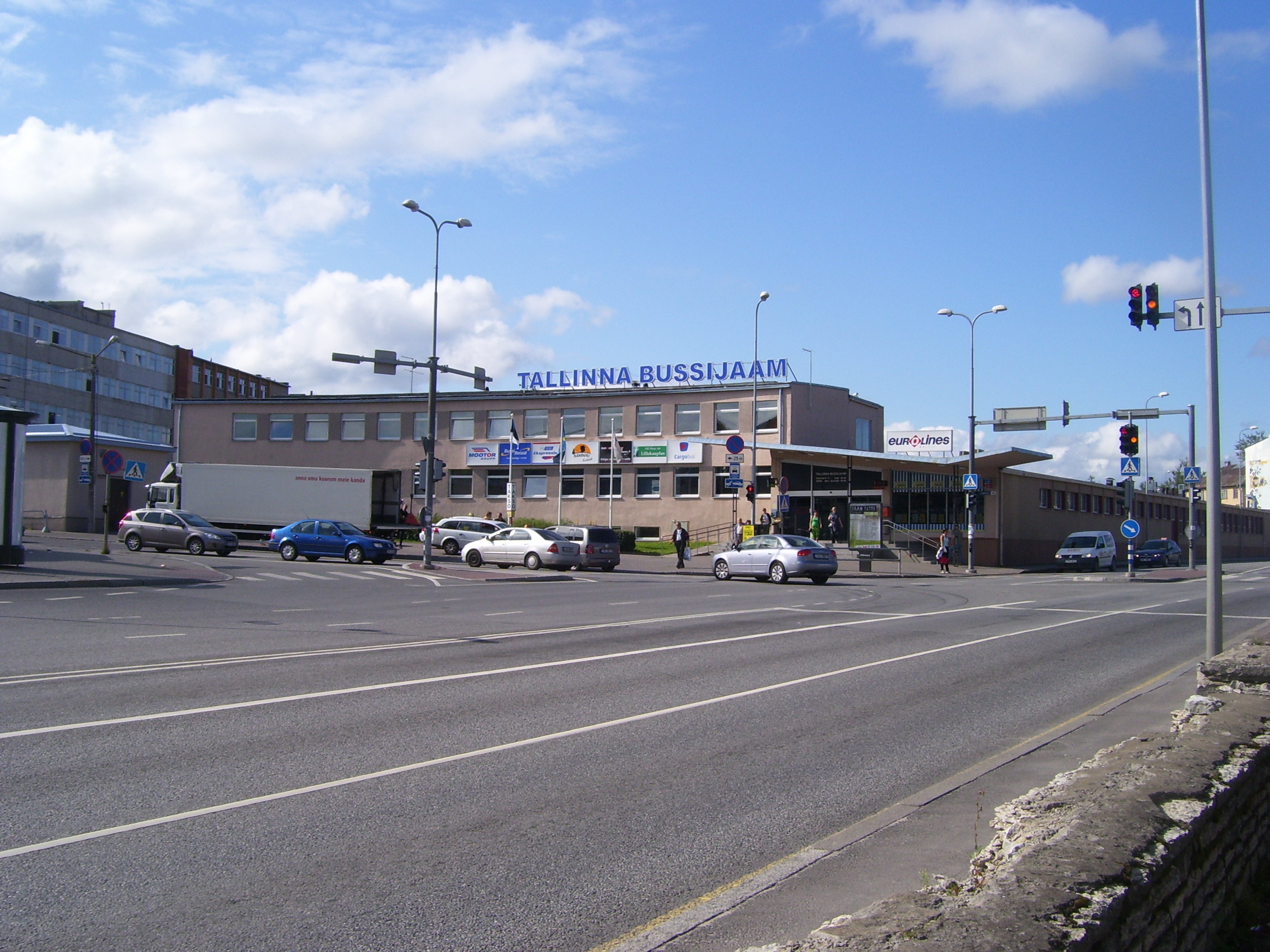
Tallinn Bus Station

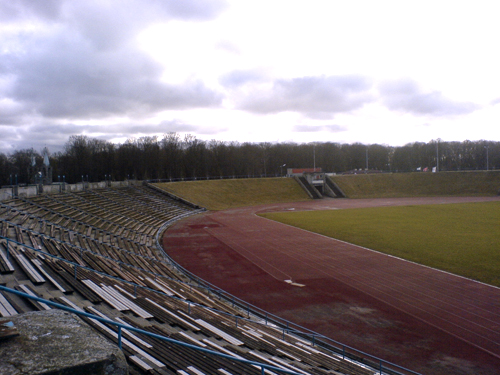
Kalevi Keskstaadion

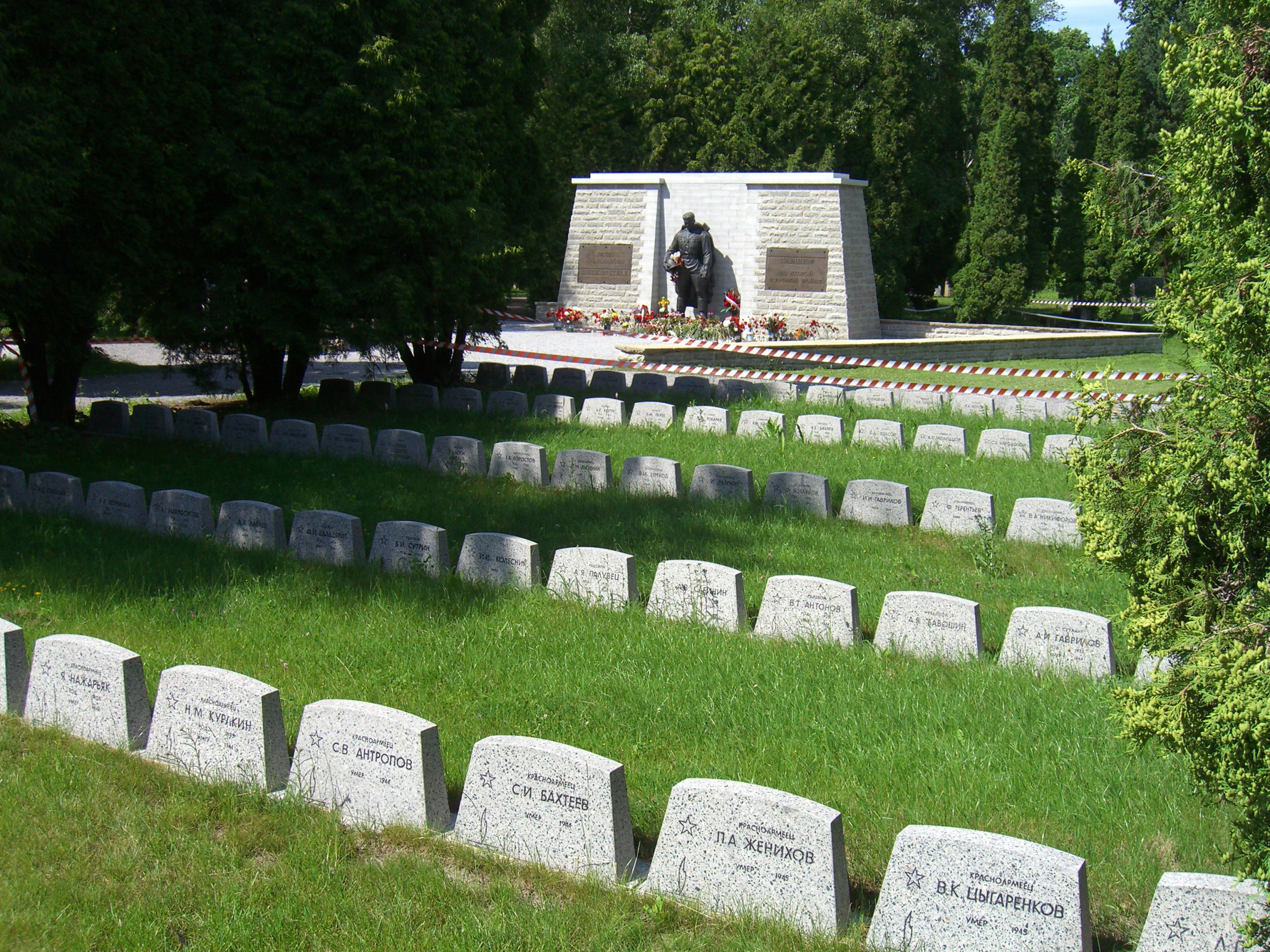
Bronze Soldier on the Tallinn Military Cemetery

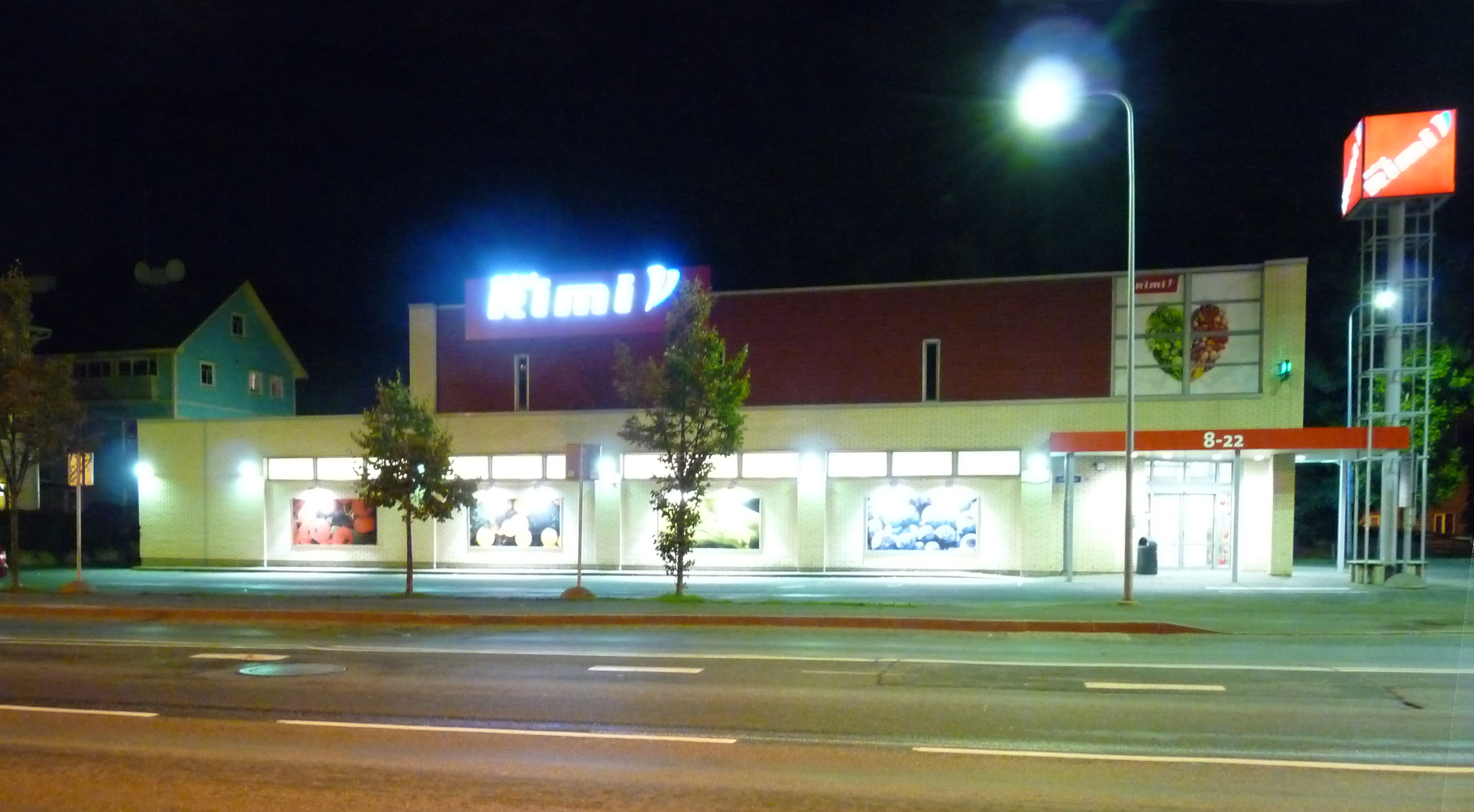
Rimi supermarket in Juhkentali street

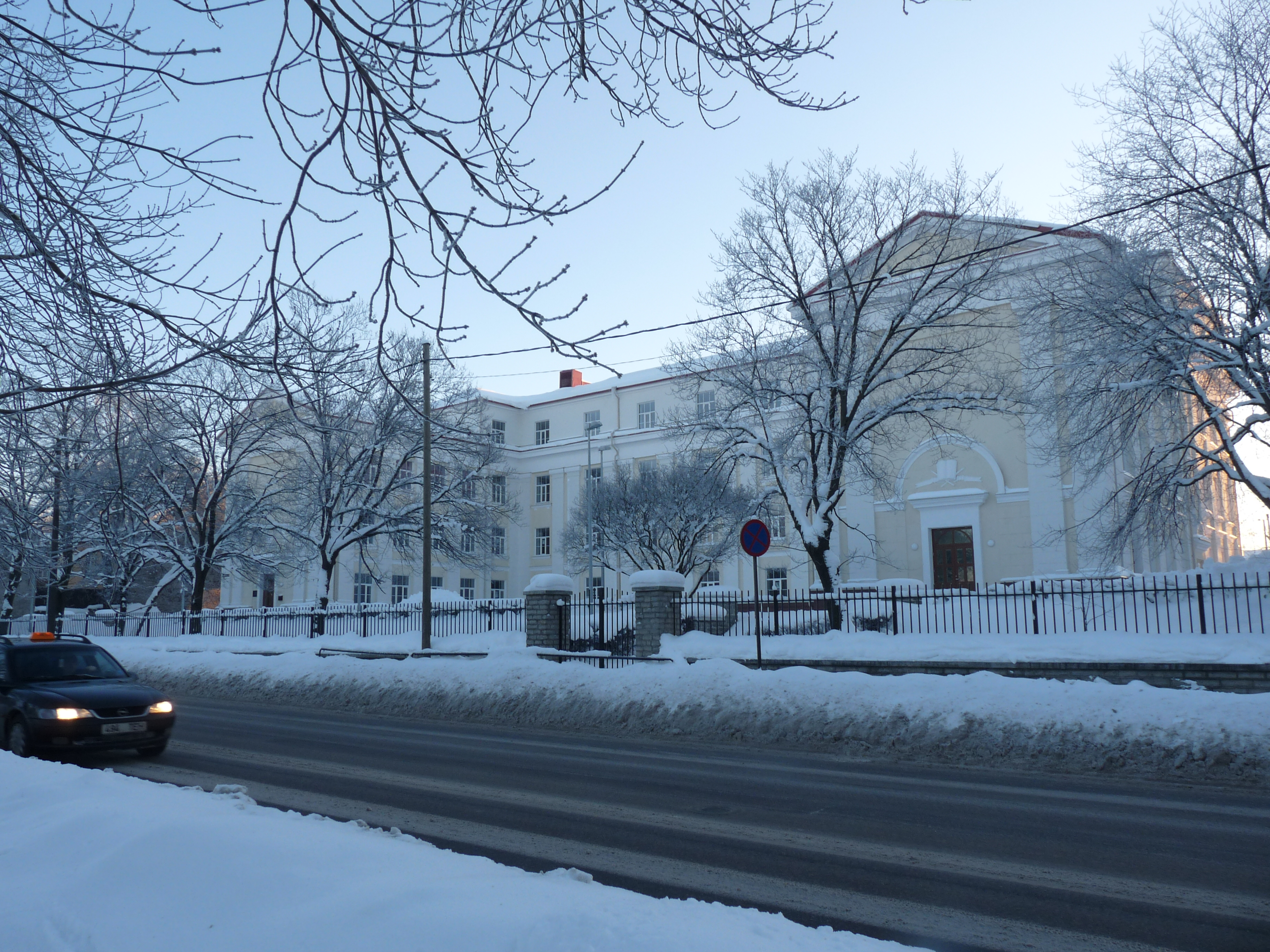
Juhkentali school

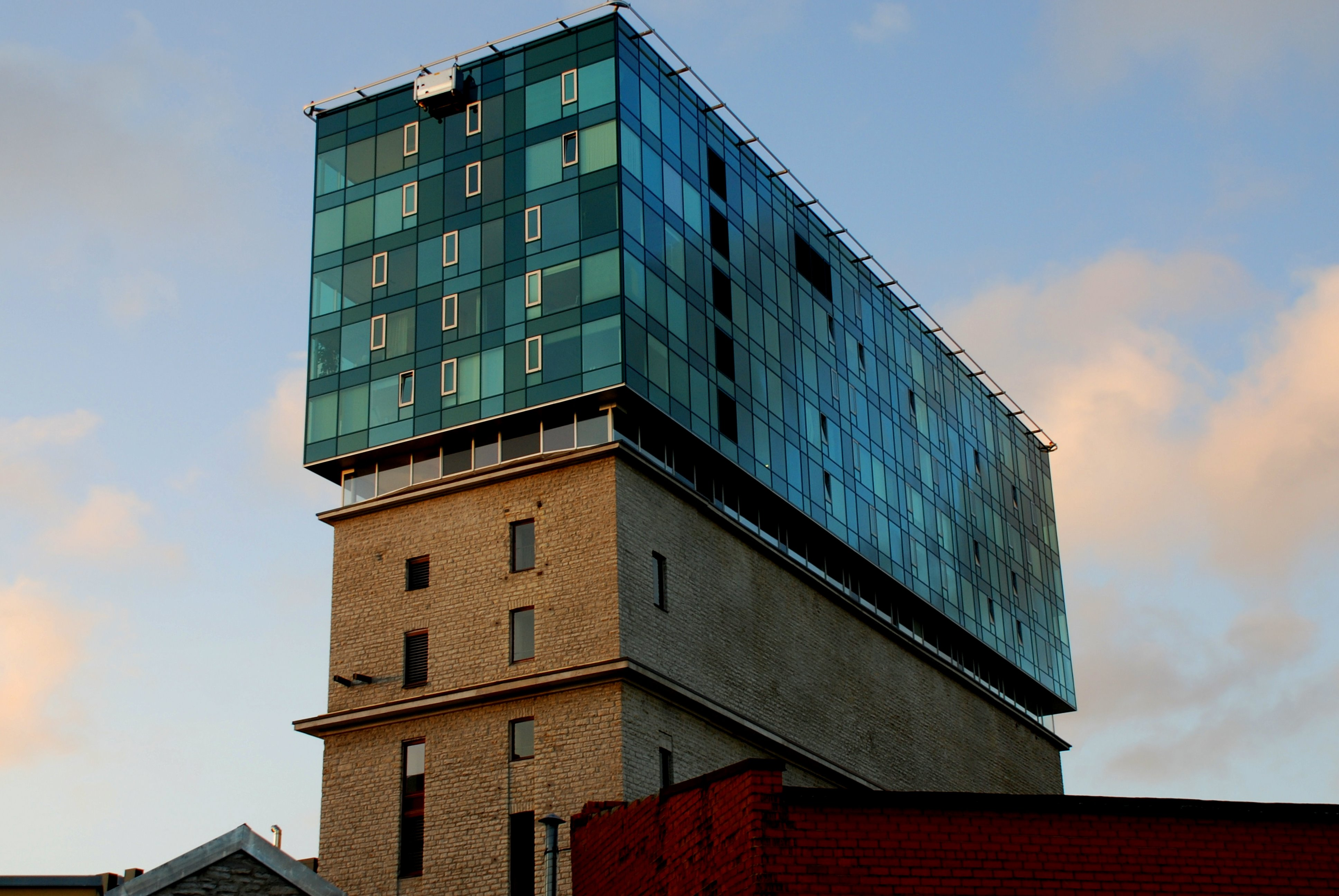
Fahle House / old cellulose factory reconstruction

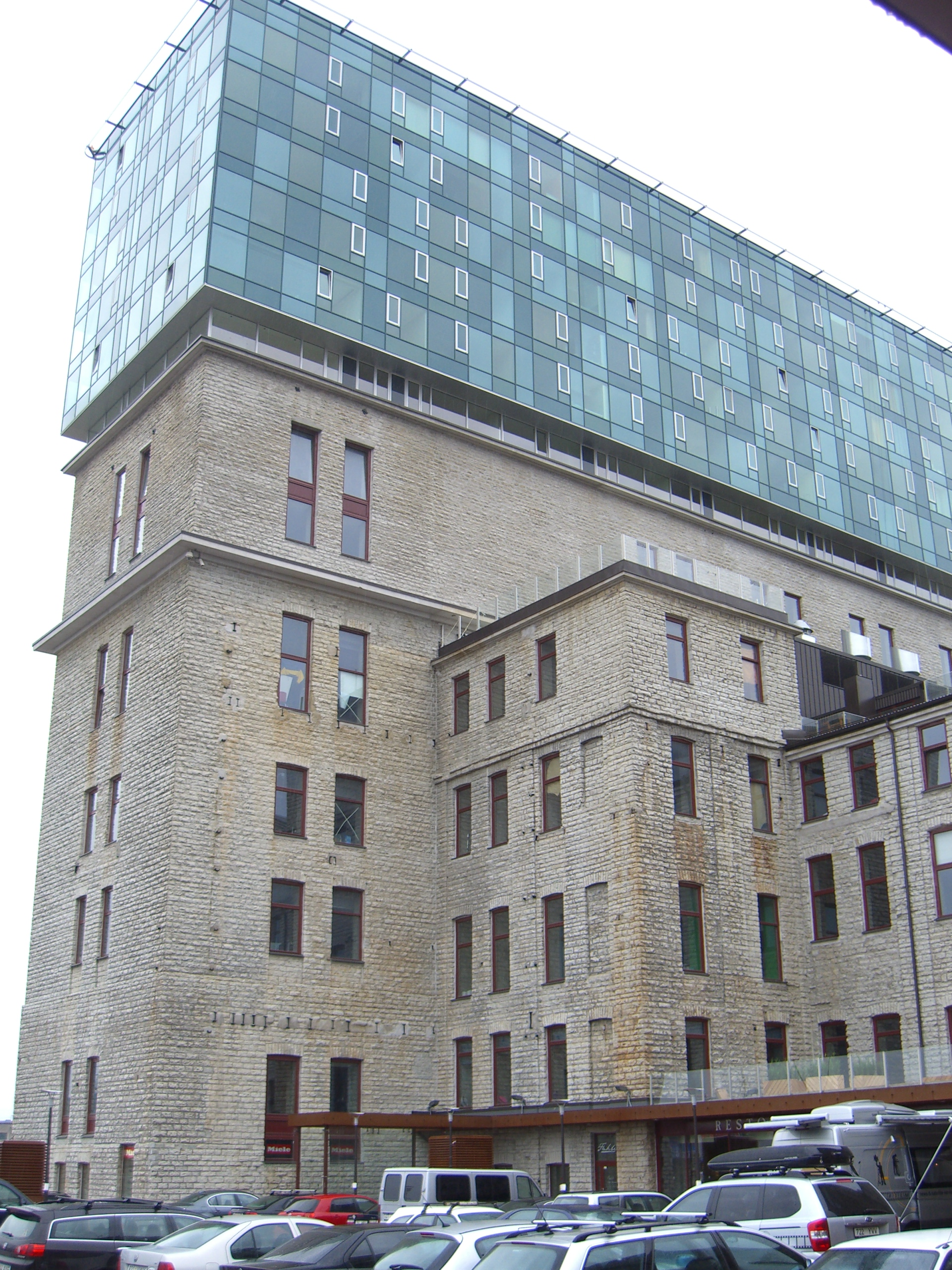

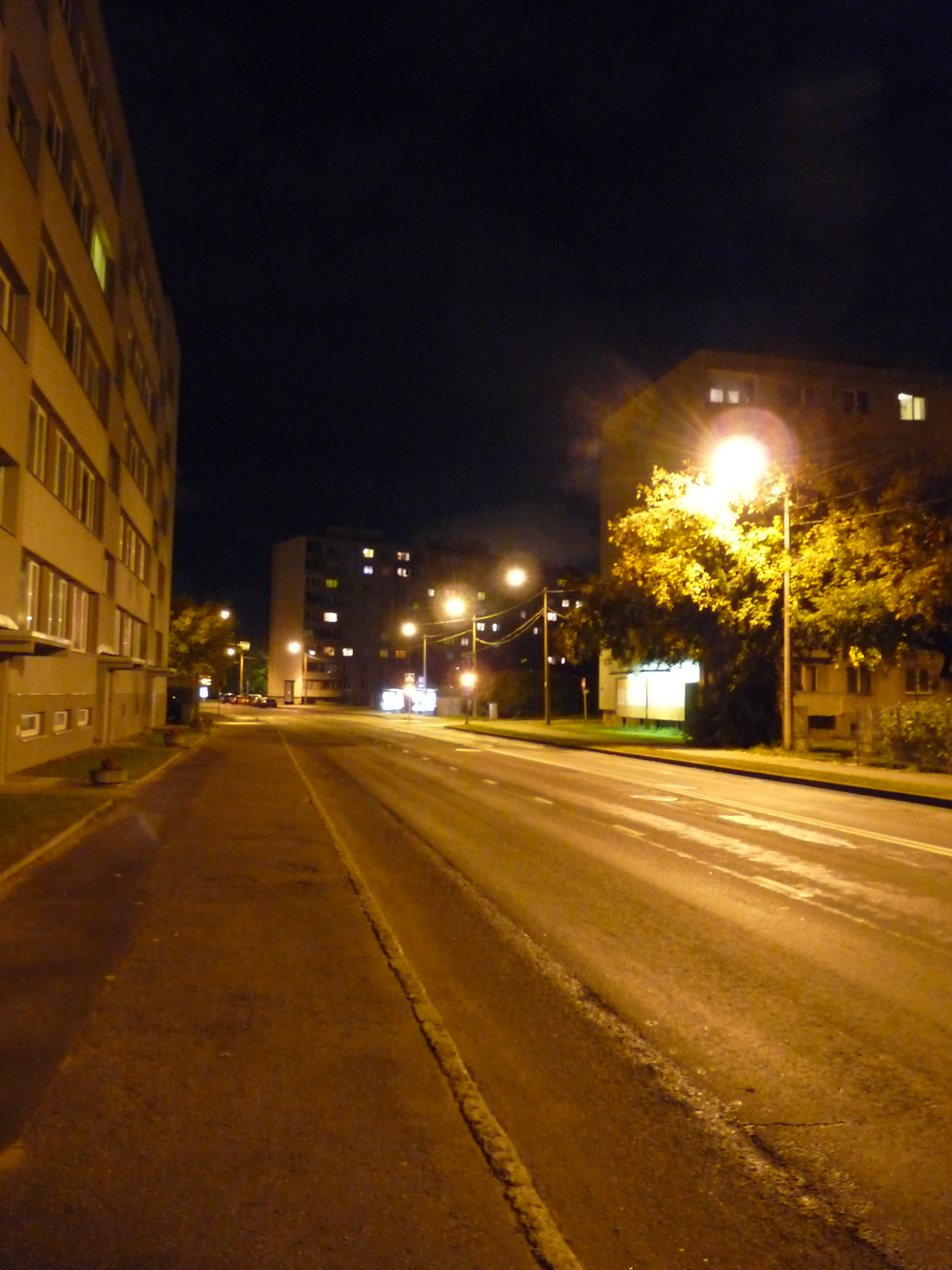
Main street of quarter

== See also ==
- Tallinn Bus Station
- Kalevi Keskstaadion
- Kalevi Spordihall
- Tallinn Sports Hall
- Siselinna Cemetery
- Military Cemetery of Tallinn
- Signal Battalion
- Cooperative Cyber Defence Centre of Excellence
