= Edgar Kant =

Estonian geographer and economist

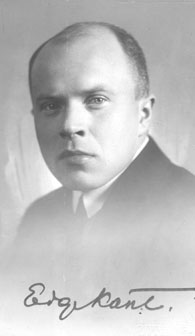
Edgar Kant (circa 1930)

Edgar Kant (21 February 1902, Tallinn – 16 October 1978, Lund) was an Estonian geographer and economist. He laid the foundation for Estonian urban geography.

In 1928 he graduated from the University of Tartu.

From 1934 he was lecturer (from 1936 professor) at Tartu University.

Since 1938 he was member of Estonia Academy of Sciences; he was also the head of department of humanitarian sciences.

In September 1944 he went to Sweden where he worked at Lund University.

Main activities: studying Estonia's geopolitical situation; Estonian urban geography; editing "Atlas of Estonia".
