= North Estonia Medical Centre =

Hospital in Tallinn

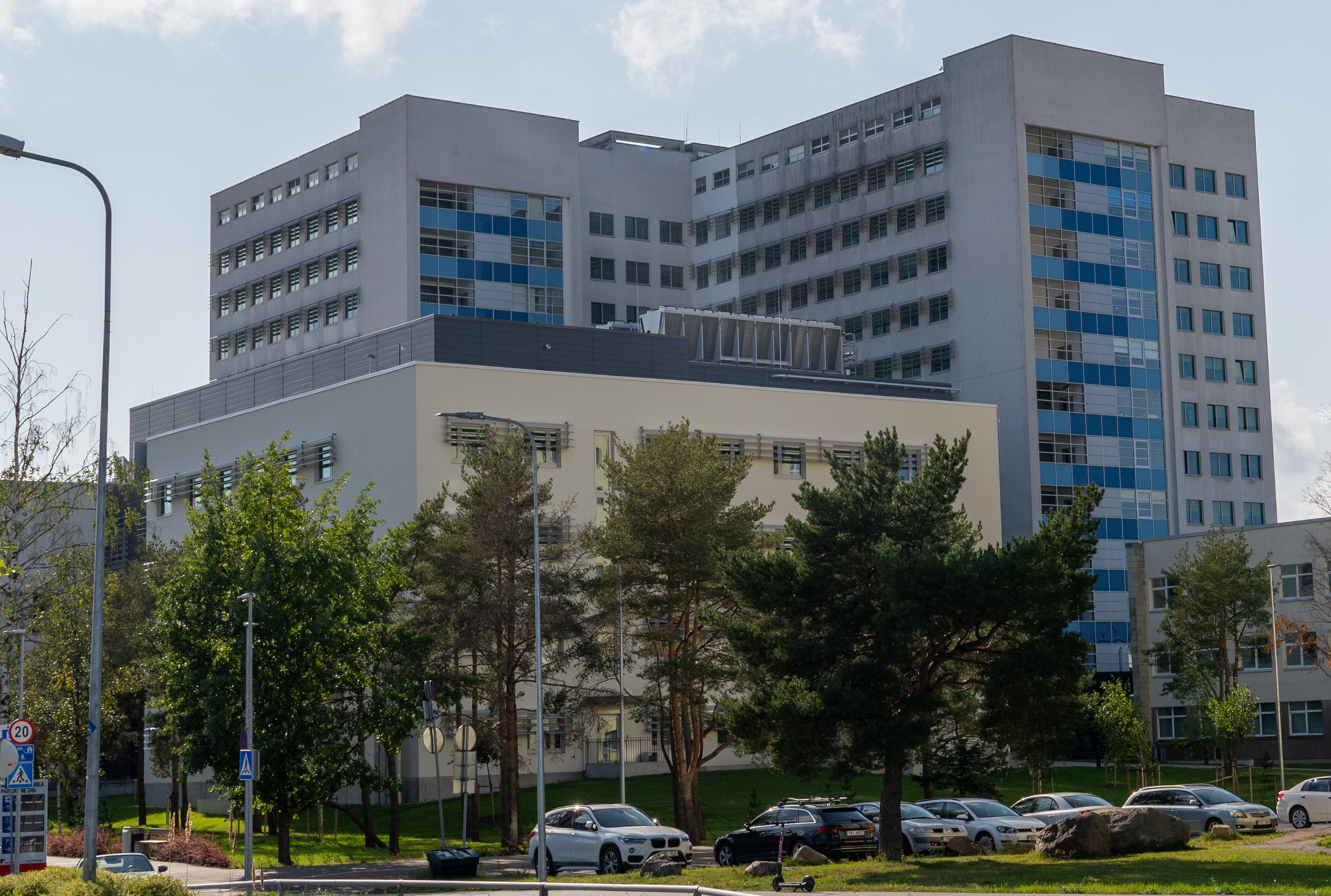
- North Estonia Medical Centre

Geography
- Location: Mustamäe, Tallinn, Estonia
- Coordinates: 59°23′55″N 24°42′04″E

History
- Founded: 2001

Links
- Website: www.regionaalhaigla.ee

North Estonia Medical Centre (abbreviated NEMC, Estonian: Põhja-Eesti Regionaalhaigla, abbreviated PERH) is an Estonian medical centre which main building is located in Mustamäe, Tallinn.

North Estonia Medical Centre Foundation was established on 25 July 2001.

The centre consists of 7 clinics and 32 specialist centres. In total, over 4800 people are working there.

In a year, about 144,000 patients are given specialised medical care. In a year, about 84,000 patients are helped via emergency medicine.
