= Estonian National Research Awards =

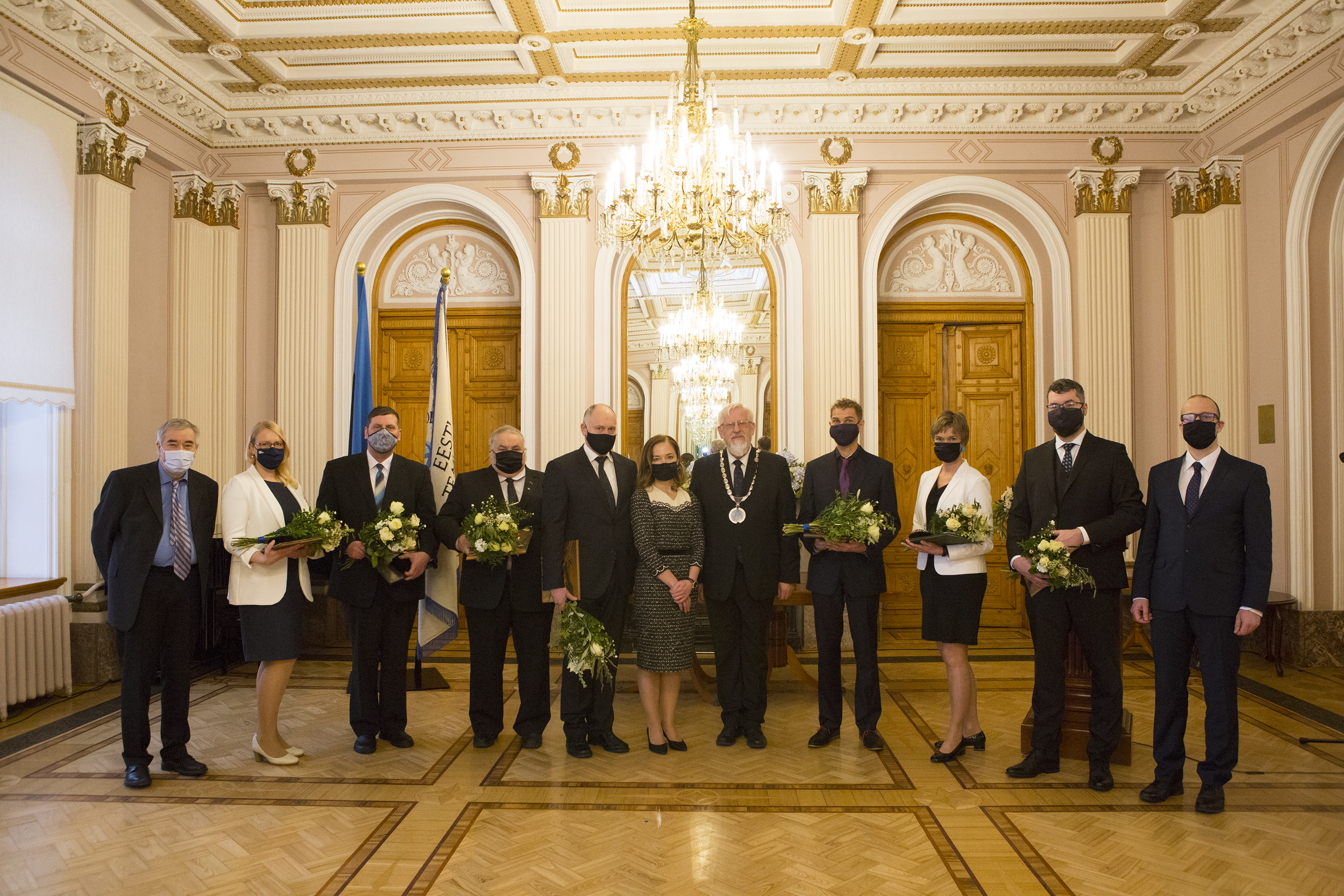
Estonian national research awards 2021

Estonian National Research Awards (Estonian: Eesti teaduspreemiad) are Estonian science awards which are given annually to Estonian researchers and research teams. Winners are chosen by Government of Estonia who bases on recommendations by Minister of Education and Research and/or specific Selection Board. Awards are given out on 24 February (Independence Day of the Republic of Estonia).

Awards are divided into three categories:

1. for outstanding lifetime achievements in research and development (two awards)
2. for research work in specific fields:

exact sciences
chemistry and molecular biology
technical sciences
medical science
geology and biology
agricultural science
social science
the humanities.

3. for an outstanding scientific discovery.
