= Veerenni =

Subdistrict of Tallinn, Estonia

Coordinates: 59°25′28.99″N 24°44′58.06″E

- Subdistrict of Tallinn
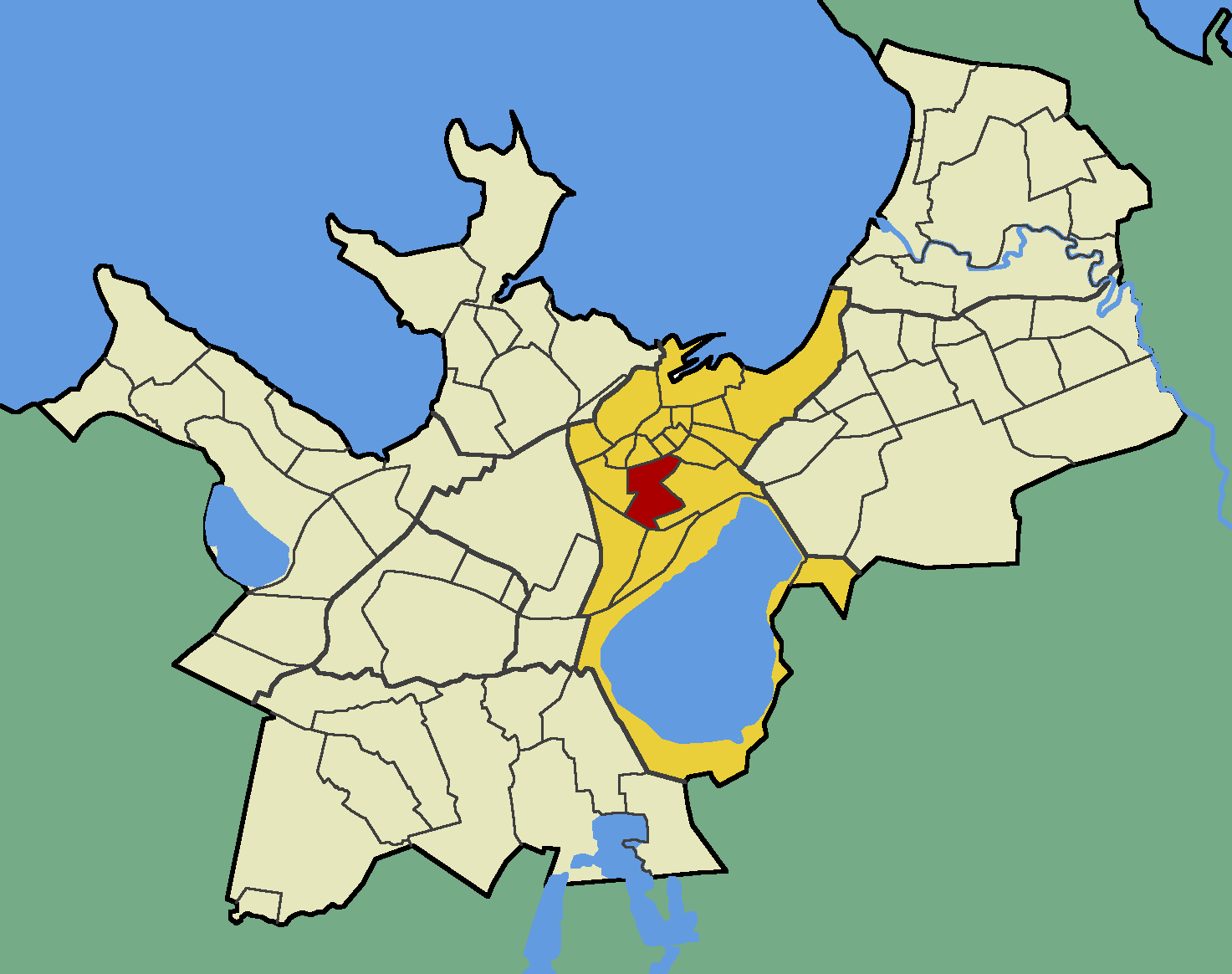
- Veerenni within the district of Kesklinn (Midtown).
- Country: Estonia
- County: Harju County
- City: Tallinn
- District: Kesklinn

Population (01.01.2014)
  - Total: 3,769

Veerenni (Estonian for "Gutter", literally "Water Groove") is a subdistrict (asum) in the district of Kesklinn (Midtown), Tallinn, the capital of Estonia. It has a population of 3,769 (As of 1 January 2014).

== Gallery ==
Harju County Court

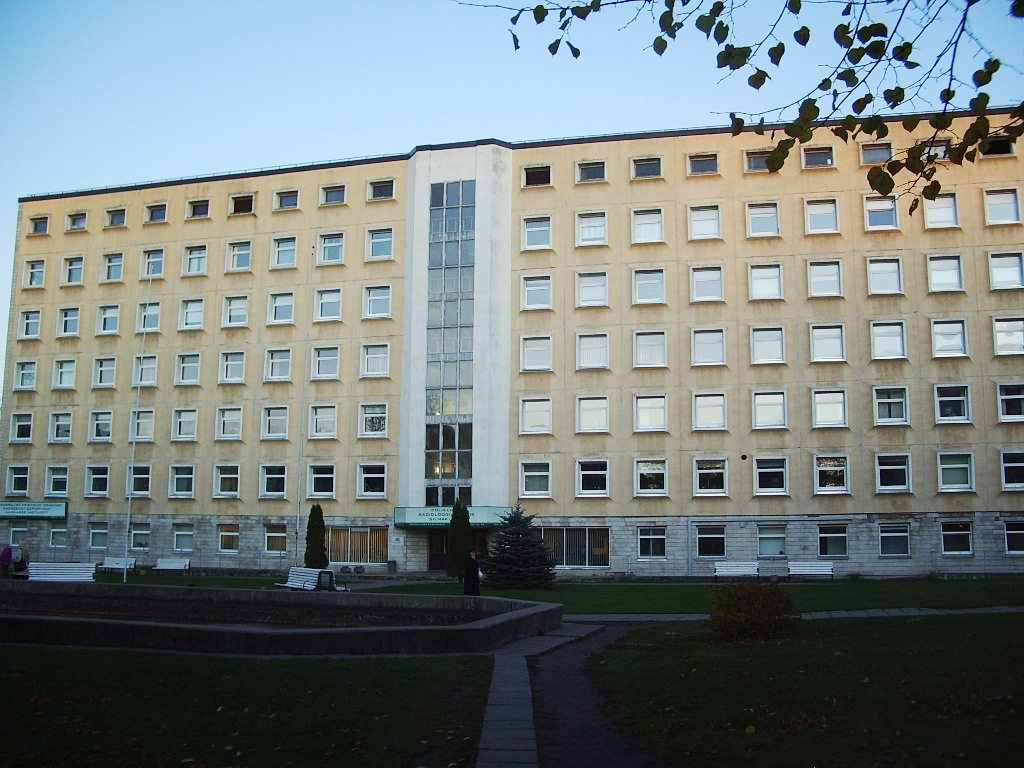
Eye Clinic of East Tallinn Central Hospital

Swedbank headquarters on Liivalaia street.

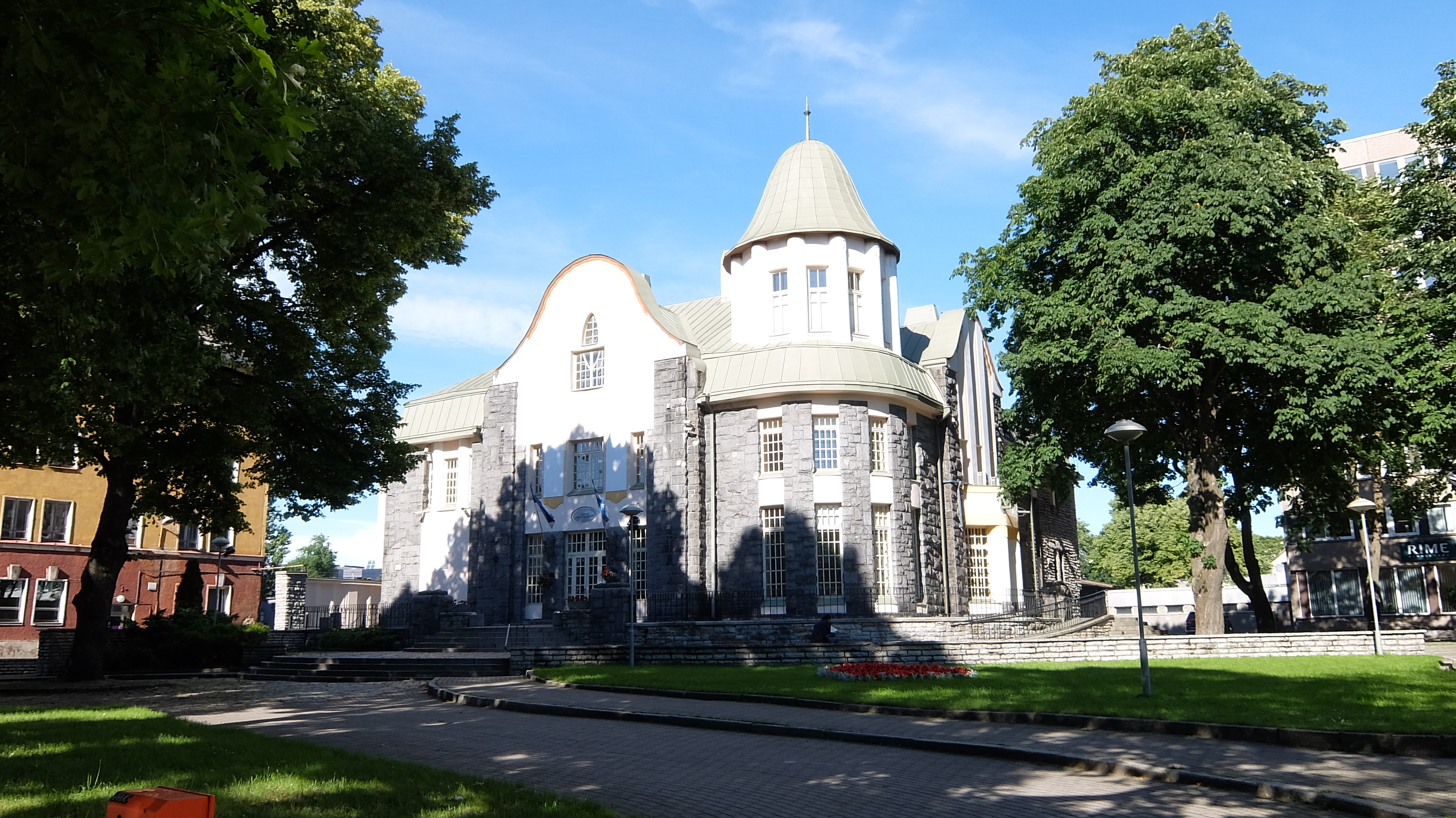
Former Luther's villa, now used as a wedding hall.

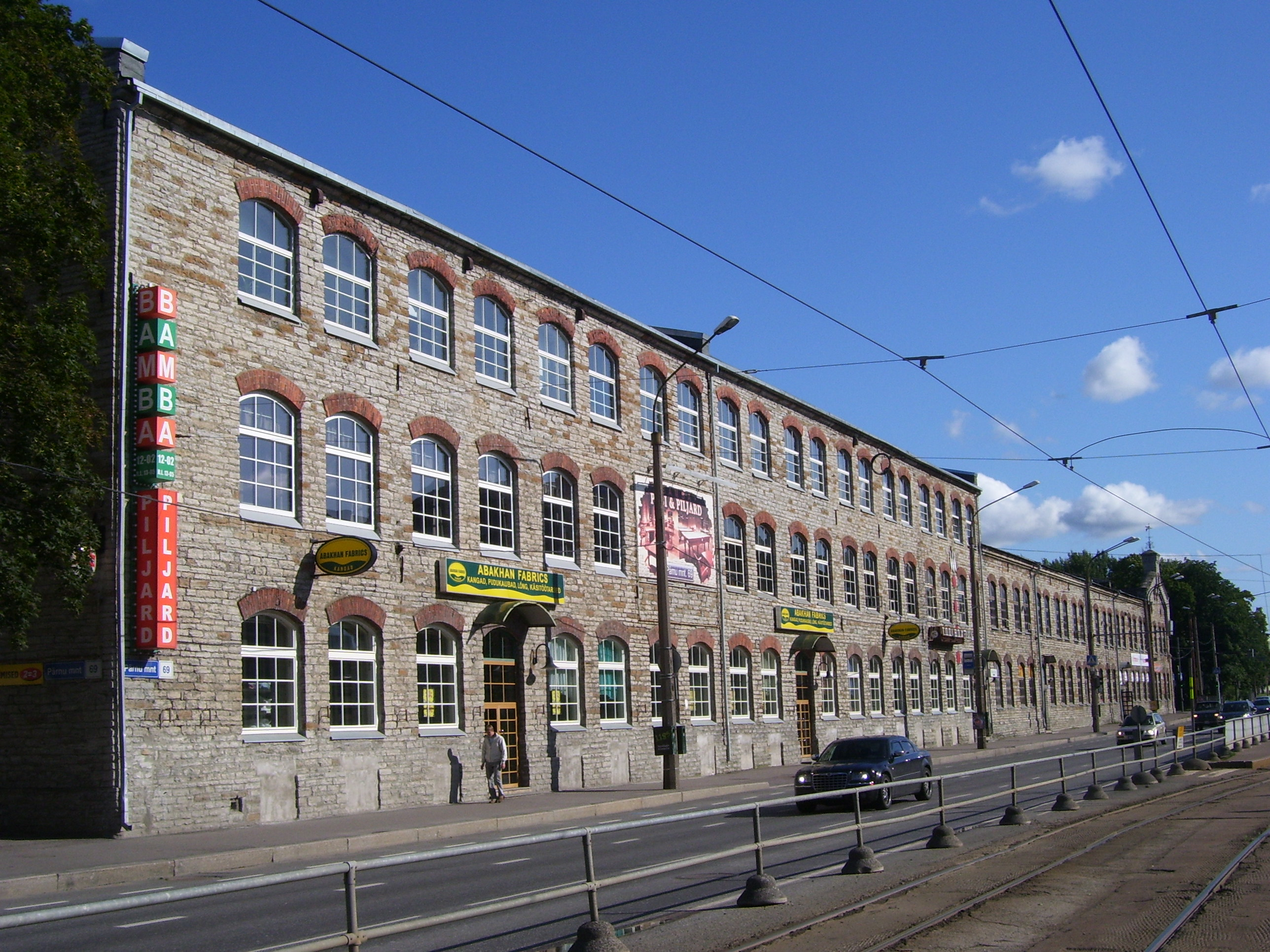
Former plywood factory on Pärnu road.

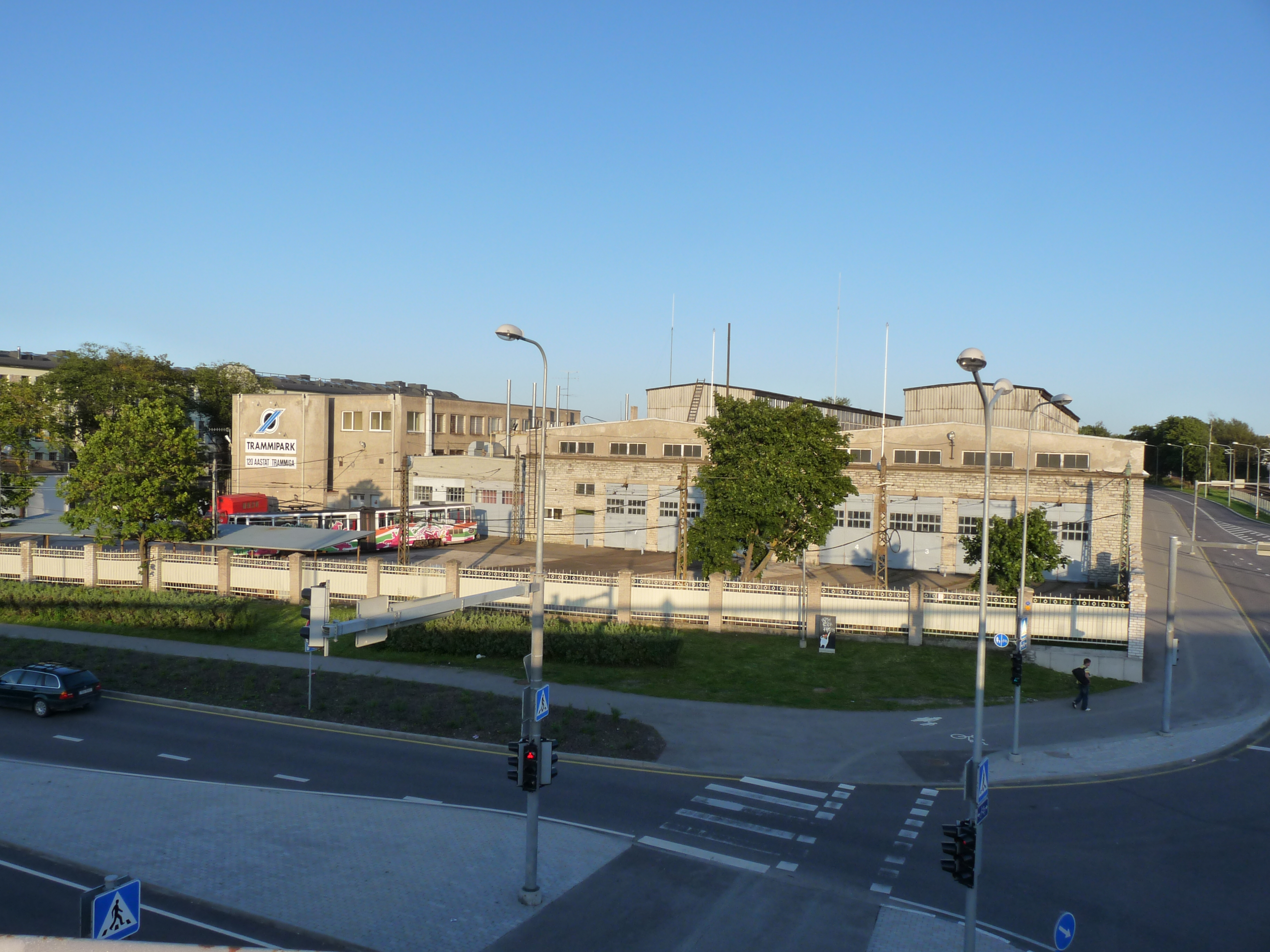
Tram depot

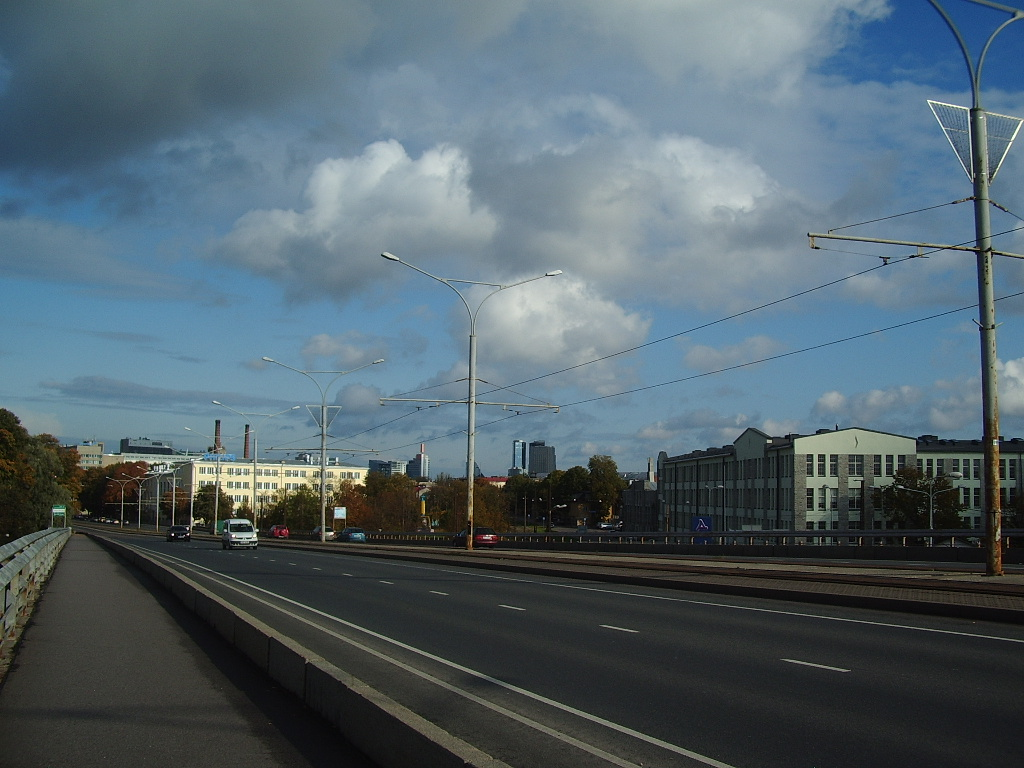
Pärnu road viaduct
