= OMX Baltic 10 =

Regional stock market index

OMX Baltic 10 (abbreviated OMXB10) is regional stock market index which includes 10 companies from Baltic states. These 10 companies, in turn, are part of Vilnius Stock Exchange, Riga Stock Exchange and Tallinn Stock Exchange.

== Companies ==
10 companies as of April 2026 are as follows:

Ticker	Company	Country	Area	Notes
ROE1L	Artea Bank	Lithuania	Banking	
LHV1T	LHV Group	Estonia	Banking	
CPA1T	Coop Pank	Estonia	Banking	
IGN1L	Ignitis grupe	Lithuania	Electric power	
INF1T	Infortar	Estonia	Conglomerate	Holds major position in Tallink Grupp
MRK1T	Merko Ehitus	Estonia	Construction	
TAL1T	Tallink Grupp	Estonia	Maritime transport, hospitality	
TSM1T	Tallinna Sadam	Estonia	Port authority	
TEL1L	Telia Lietuva	Lithuania	Telecommunications	
TKM1T	TKM Grupp	Estonia	Wholesale, retail	

== Former companies ==
(Estonia) Estonian

- Baltika Group
- Eesti Telekom
- Enefit Green
- Harju Elekter
- Olympic Entertainment Group
- Silvano Fashion Group
- Tallinna Vesi

(Latvia) Latvian

- Grindeks
- Olainfarm

(Lithuania) Lithuanian

- Apranga
- City Service
- Invalda
- Klaipėdos nafta
- Mažeikių nafta
- Panevėžio Statybos Trestas
- Snoras
- Ūkio bankas
