= List of tallest buildings in Estonia =

This is a list of tallest buildings in Estonia. All buildings over 50 m (164 ft) are listed. High-rises of this scale are unique to Tallinn and Tartu as of 2026, but there have been proposals for other cities in the past. Only habitable buildings are ranked, which excludes radio masts and towers, observation towers, steeples, chimneys and other tall architectural structures. For those, see List of tallest structures in Estonia.

== Completed buildings ==
Was the tallest building in Estonia upon completion

Rank	Name	Image	City	Height in m (ft)	Floors	Year completed
1-2	Swissôtel Tallinn		Tallinn	117 m (384 ft)	30	2007
1-2	Tornimäe 7		Tallinn	117 m (384 ft)	30	2007
3	Arter Kvartal		Tallinn	111 m (364 ft)	28	2024
4	Maakri Torn		Tallinn	110 m (361 ft)	30	2018
5	Radisson Collection Hotel Tallinn		Tallinn	104.8 m (344 ft)	25	2001
6	Skyon		Tallinn	95 m (312 ft)	26	2021
7	SEB Pank		Tallinn	94 m (308 ft)	24	1999
8	Tigutorn		Tartu	89.92 m (295 ft)	23	2008
9	Radisson Blu Hotel Olümpia		Tallinn	84 m (276 ft)	26	1980
10	City Plaza		Tallinn	78 m (256 ft)	23	2004
11	Sokos Hotel Viru		Tallinn	74 m (243 ft)	23	1972
12	Maakri Maja		Tallinn	72 m (236 ft)	20	2003
13	Torn (Seebi 1)		Tallinn	67 m (220 ft)	20	2021
14	Al Mare Ärimaja		Tallinn	65 m (213 ft)	16	2009
15-17	Järve Tornid I		Tallinn	63 m (207 ft)	19	2020
15-17	Järve Tornid II		Tallinn	63 m (207 ft)	18	2020
15-17	Arter Kvartal Tower B		Tallinn	63 m (207 ft)	15	2024
18-19	Rocca Tower II		Tallinn	60.4 m (198 ft)	18	2022
18-19	Rocca Tower III		Tallinn	60.4 m (198 ft)	18	2022
20	Maakri HUB		Tallinn	58.6 m (192 ft)	17	2000
21	Vektor		Tallinn	56.5 m (185 ft)	16	2024
22-24	Paju 2		Tartu	56 m (184 ft)	16	2019
22-24	WoHo II		Tallinn	56 m (184 ft)	14	2019
22-24	Lelle 24		Tallinn	56 m (184 ft)	16	2015
25	Osten Tor		Tallinn	55.6 m (182 ft)	16	2006
26-27	Fahle Maja		Tallinn	55 m (180 ft)	14	2006
26-27	Telia Maja		Tallinn	55 m (180 ft)	14	2017
28	Luminori Maja		Tallinn	54.2 m (178 ft)	14	2009
29	Novira Plaza		Tallinn	53.1 m (174 ft)	15	2016
30	Kentmanni 6		Tallinn	52.4 m (172 ft)	14	2015
31-34	Ministeeriumide Ühishoone I		Tallinn	52 m (171 ft)	14	2017
31-34	Ministeeriumide Ühishoone II		Tallinn	52 m (171 ft)	14	2017
31-34	Emajõe Business Centre		Tartu	52 m (171 ft)	15	1998
31-34	Pirita tee 26f		Tallinn	52 m (171 ft)	16	2003
35	Eesti Energia		Tallinn	51 m (167 ft)	14	2015
36	EPA Torn		Tartu	51.84 m (170 ft)	16	1976
37-40	Sõpruse pst 222		Tallinn	50 m (164 ft)	17	1991
37-40	Kalevipoja põik 10		Tallinn	50 m (164 ft)	17	1989
37-40	P. Pinna 19		Tallinn	50 m (164 ft)	17	1982
37-40	J. Koorti 18		Tallinn	50 m (164 ft)	17	1992

== Under construction ==
Rank	Name	City	Height	Floors	Est. completion
1	Eedu	Tallinn	105 m (344 ft)	30	2027
2	City Plaza 2	Tallinn	101.2 m (332 ft)	27	2028
3	Al Mare Torn	Tallinn	82 m (269 ft)	22	2026
4	Mustamäe Manhattan	Tallinn	76.1 m (250 ft)	24	2027
5	Stellar Residence	Tallinn	53.7 m (176 ft)	16	2027
6	Kalda Torn	Tartu	51 m (167 ft)	15	2027

== Proposed ==
Rank	Name	City	Height	Floors	Status
1	Manufaktuuri Kvartal	Tallinn	200 m (660 ft)	60	Proposed
2	Lennuki 1	Tallinn	186 m (610 ft)	44	Awaiting Approval
3	Maakri 26	Tallinn	160 m (520 ft)	39	Awaiting Approval
4	Maakri 34	Tallinn	130 m (430 ft)	33	Awaiting Approval
5	Tartu mnt 17	Tallinn	125 m (410 ft)	33	Proposed
7-8	Stockmann Estate I	Tallinn	122 m (400 ft)	36	Proposed
7-8	Stockmann Estate II	Tallinn	122 m (400 ft)	36	Proposed
6	EELK kõrghoone	Tallinn	≤120m (394 ft)	36	Approved
9	Maakri 23a	Tallinn	107 m (351 ft)	28	Proposed
10	Grossi Torn	Rakvere	—	16	Approved (Paused)
11	Lai 15b	Pärnu	≤54m (177 ft)	15	Awaiting Approval

== See also ==
- List of tallest structures in Estonia
- List of tallest buildings in the Baltic states
- List of high-rise buildings and structures in Tallinn
