= Maakri =

Subdistrict of Tallinn, Estonia

Coordinates: 59°25′57.78″N 24°45′35.24″E

- Subdistrict of Tallinn
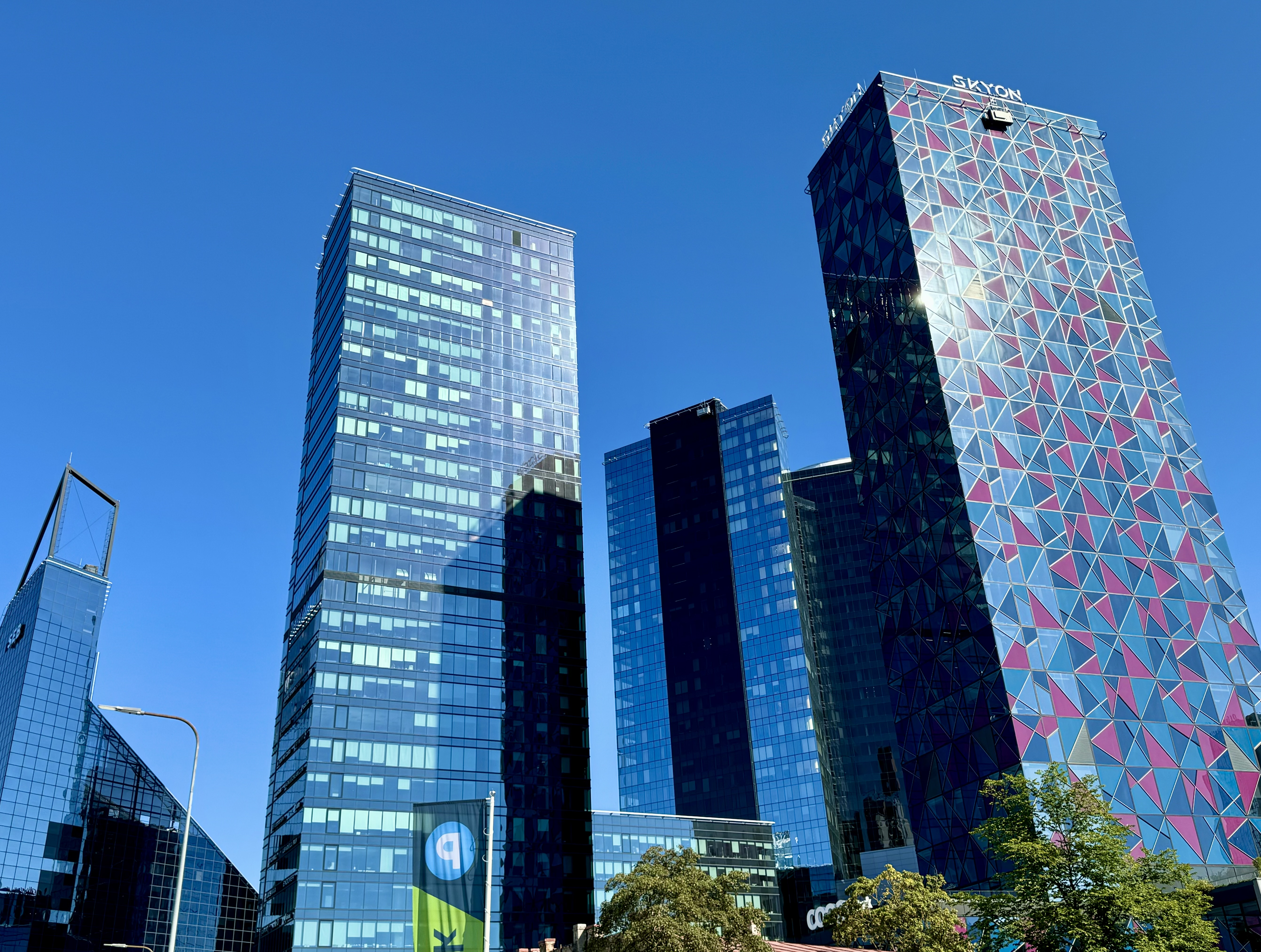
- Maakri (2024) with its high-rises (from left to right): SEB Tallinn headquarters, Maakri Kvartal, Tornimäe 7, Skyon

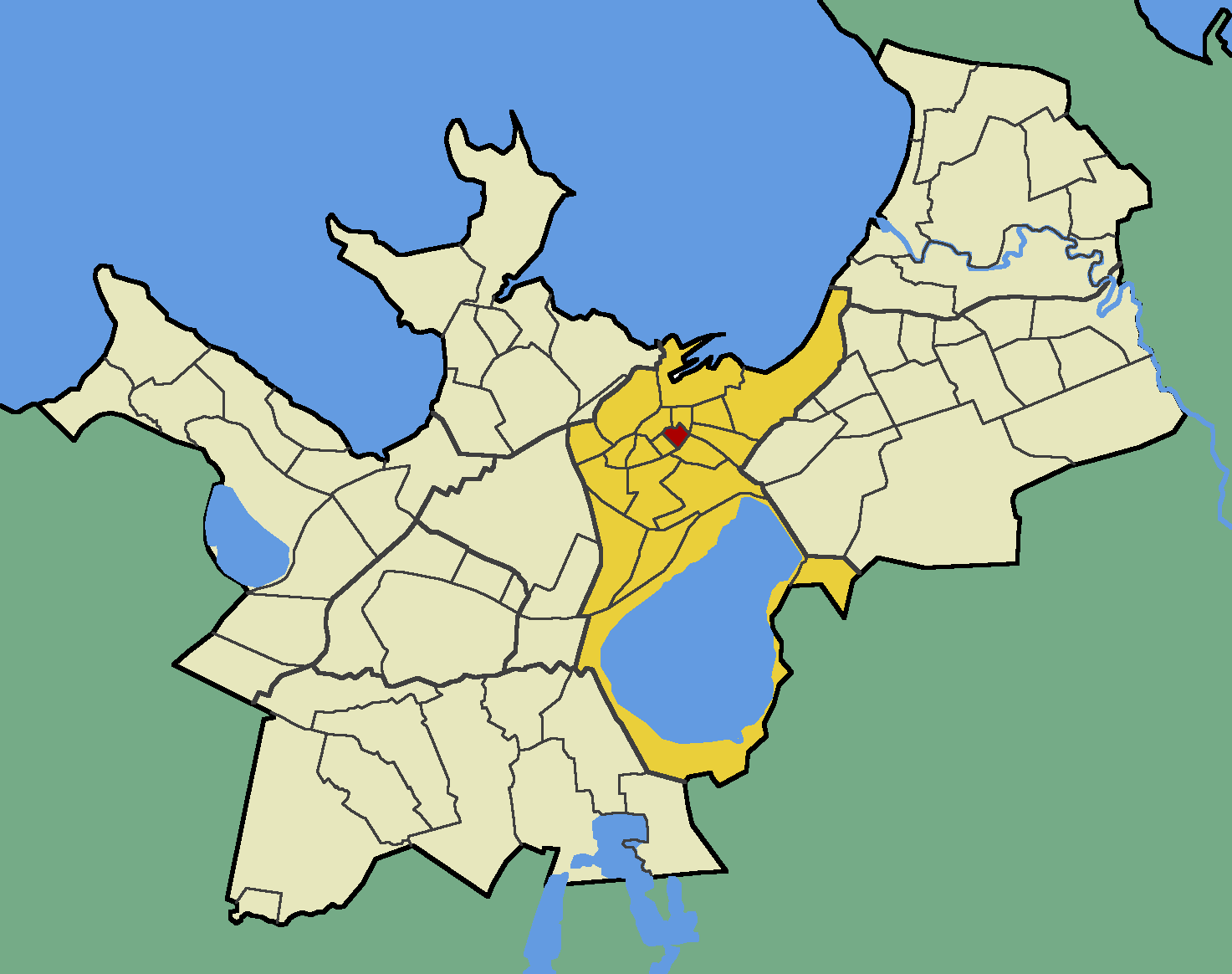
- Maakri within the district of Kesklinn (Midtown).
- Country: Estonia
- County: Harju County
- City: Tallinn
- District: Kesklinn

Area
  - Total: 013 km^{2} (5.0 sq mi)

Population (01.01.2022)
  - Total: 1,099

Maakri is a subdistrict (Estonian: asum) in the district of Kesklinn (Midtown), Tallinn, the capital of Estonia. It has a population of 1,099 (As of 1 January 2022). In the last decade Maakri has developed into the main business centre of Tallinn. Many high-rise buildings have been built into the area during this period.

== History ==
Maakri subdistrict is named after the Macker family, who owned a painting workshop located at Maakri 23.

The latter part of the 19th century saw Maakri become home to many shops and industrial factories, as well as to the first Great Synagogue of Tallinn, which was built in 1884 and destroyed in the 1944 March bombing. Maakri was also home to the Tallinn Paper Factory, which was located on the site of the current Stockmann department store, and to Theodor Grünwald's leather and footwear factory, which today has been redeveloped as Maakri Kvartal.

After the Estonian Restoration of independence, many high-rise buildings have been built in the Maakri area. In 1999, the first high-rise was completed - the 94-metre tall SEB Pank headquarters.

== Skyscrapers and high-rises ==
Maakri is home to the majority of the tallest buildings in Tallinn.

Building	Height	Year completed
Swissôtel Tallinn	117 m	2007
Tornimäe 7	117 m	2007
Maakri Kvartal	110 m	2018
Radisson Collection Hotel	105 m	2001
Skyon	95 m	2021
SEB Pank	94 m	1999
Maakri Maja	72 m	2003
Maakri HUB	58.6 m	2000
Luminori Maja	54.2 m	2009

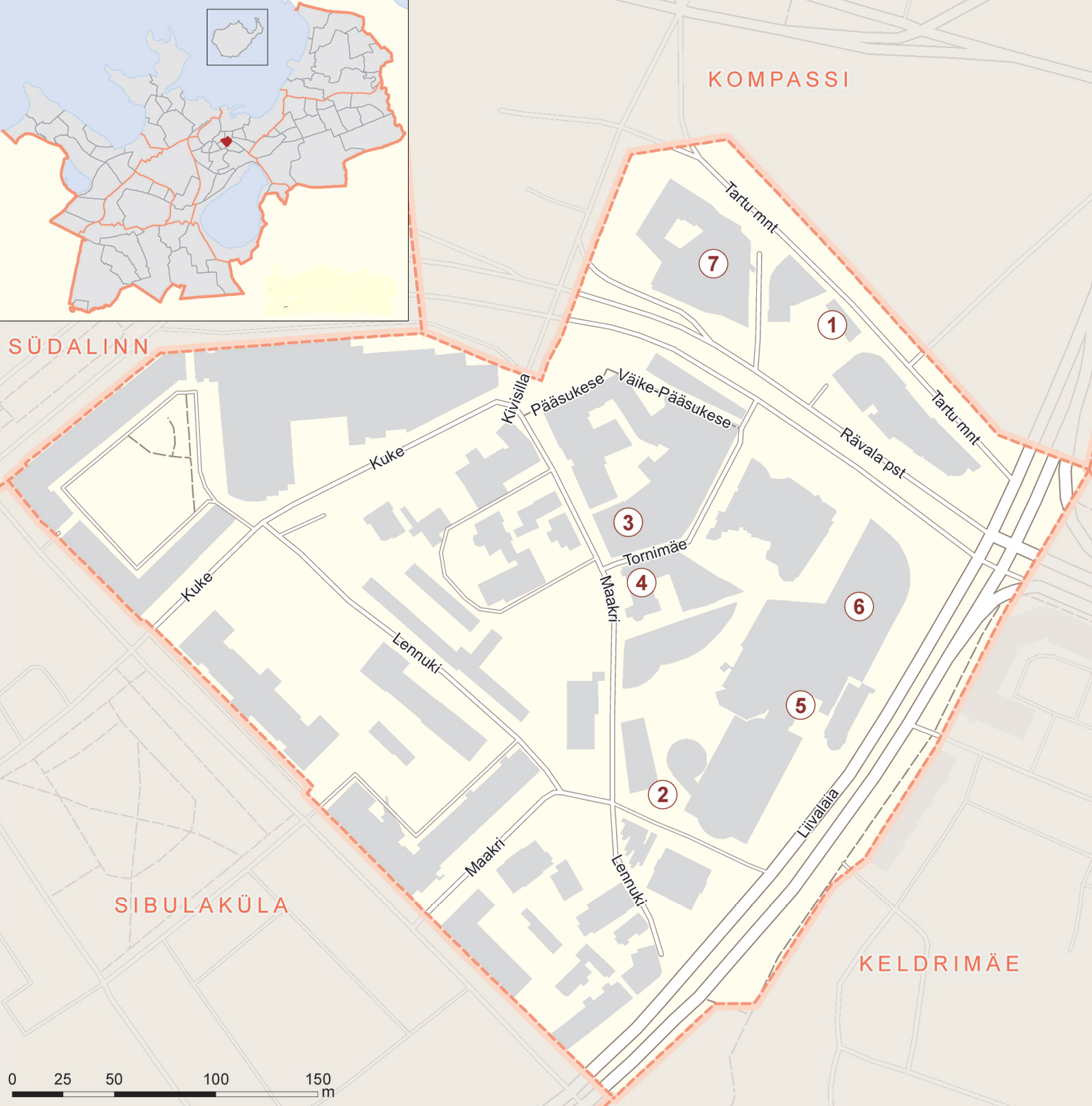
Map of the Maakri subdistrict

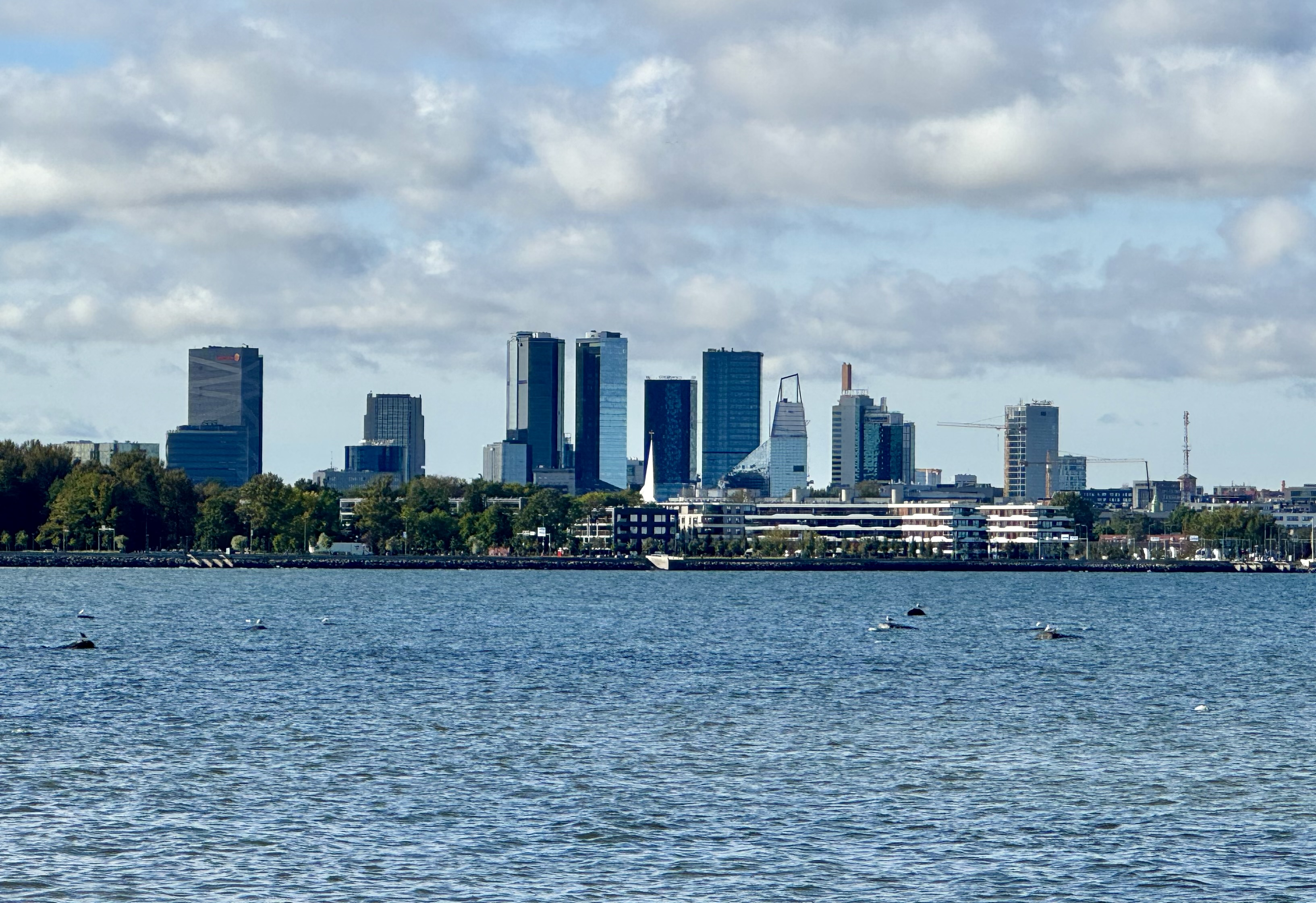
Tallinn skyline in 2025

Furthermore, a number of high-rise buildings such as Arter Kvartal (111 m), Hotel Olümpia (84 m), City Plaza (78 m), Hotel Viru (74 m) and Novira Plaza (53 m) are situated in the close proximity to the Maakri subdistrict, meaning together they form a consistent skyline of the Tallinn city centre.

The future of Maakri sees the density of high-rise buildings increase, as a number of proposed projects are in development, such as a 30-floor Lauteri 3 development by EBS, a 36-floor Maakri 29 development by the Estonian Evangelical Lutheran Church and a cluster of high-rise buildings planned by Capital Mill on the site of the area between Lennuki and Maakri streets.

== Gallery ==
Historical Maakri

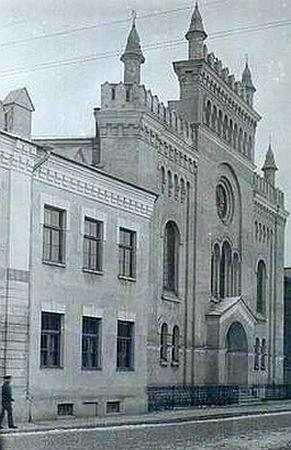
The Great Synagogue of Tallinn was built in 1884 and destroyed in the March bombing of 1944

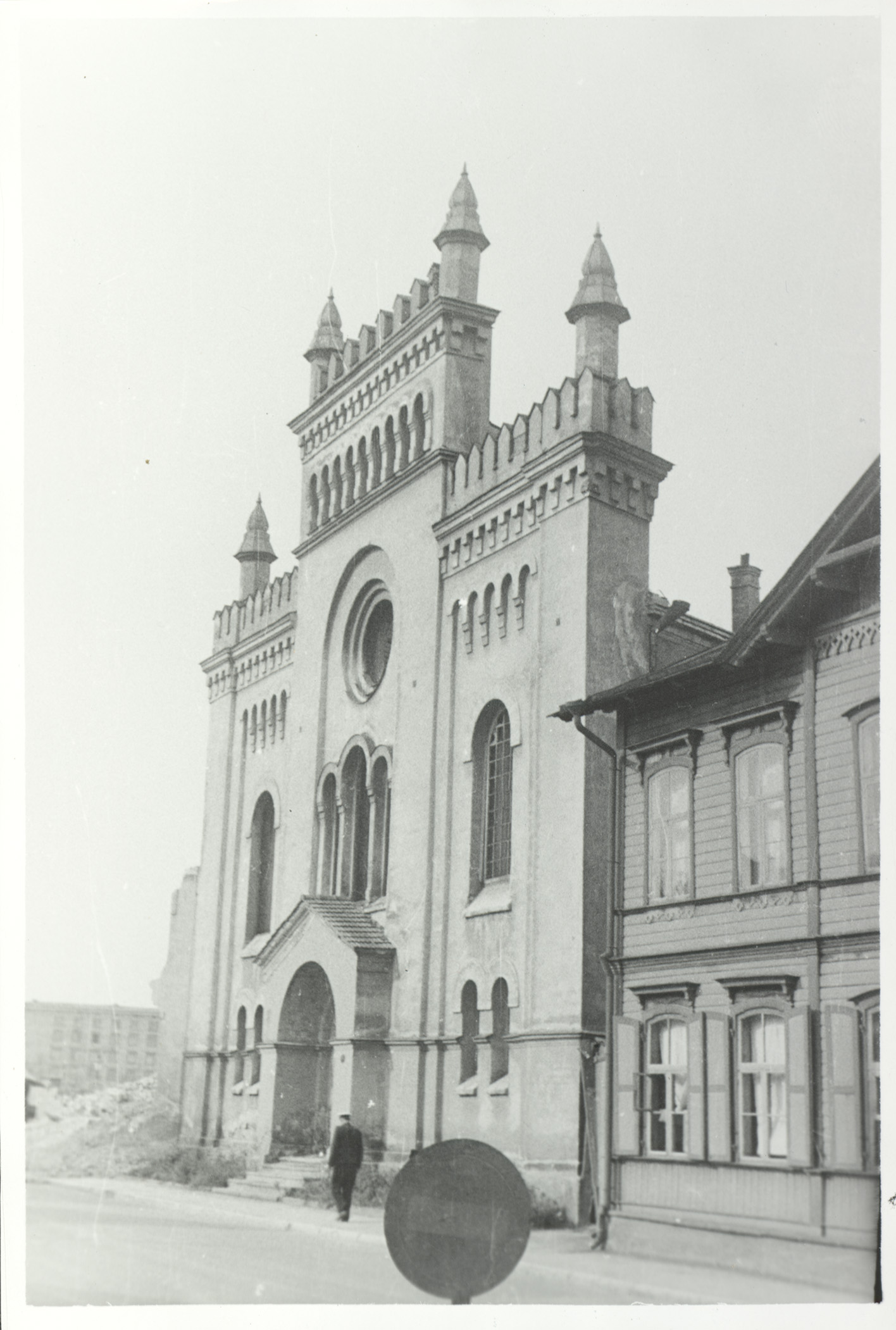
The Synagogue was located at the corner of Sakala and Maakri streets

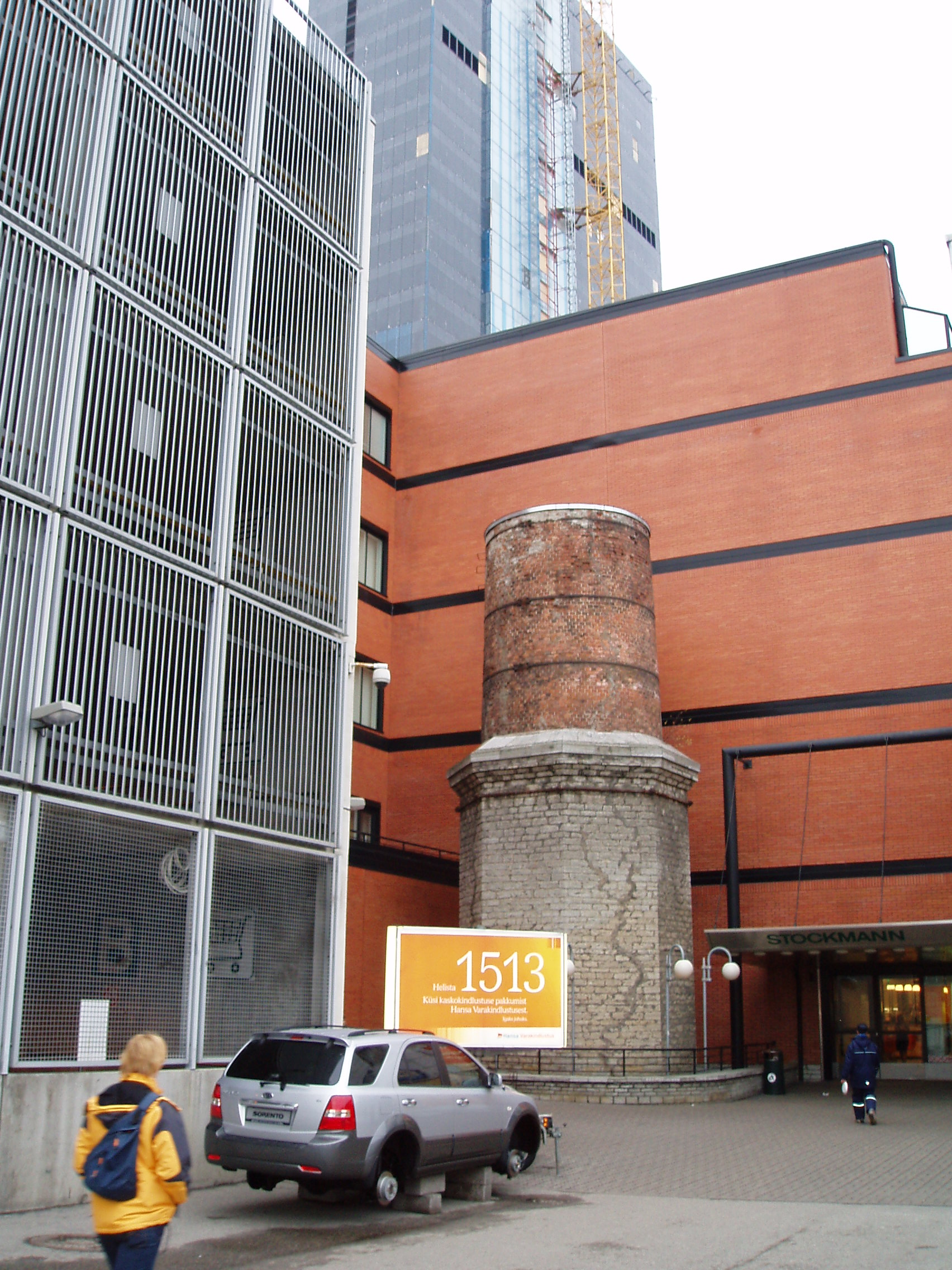
The old chimney of the Tallinn Paper Factory

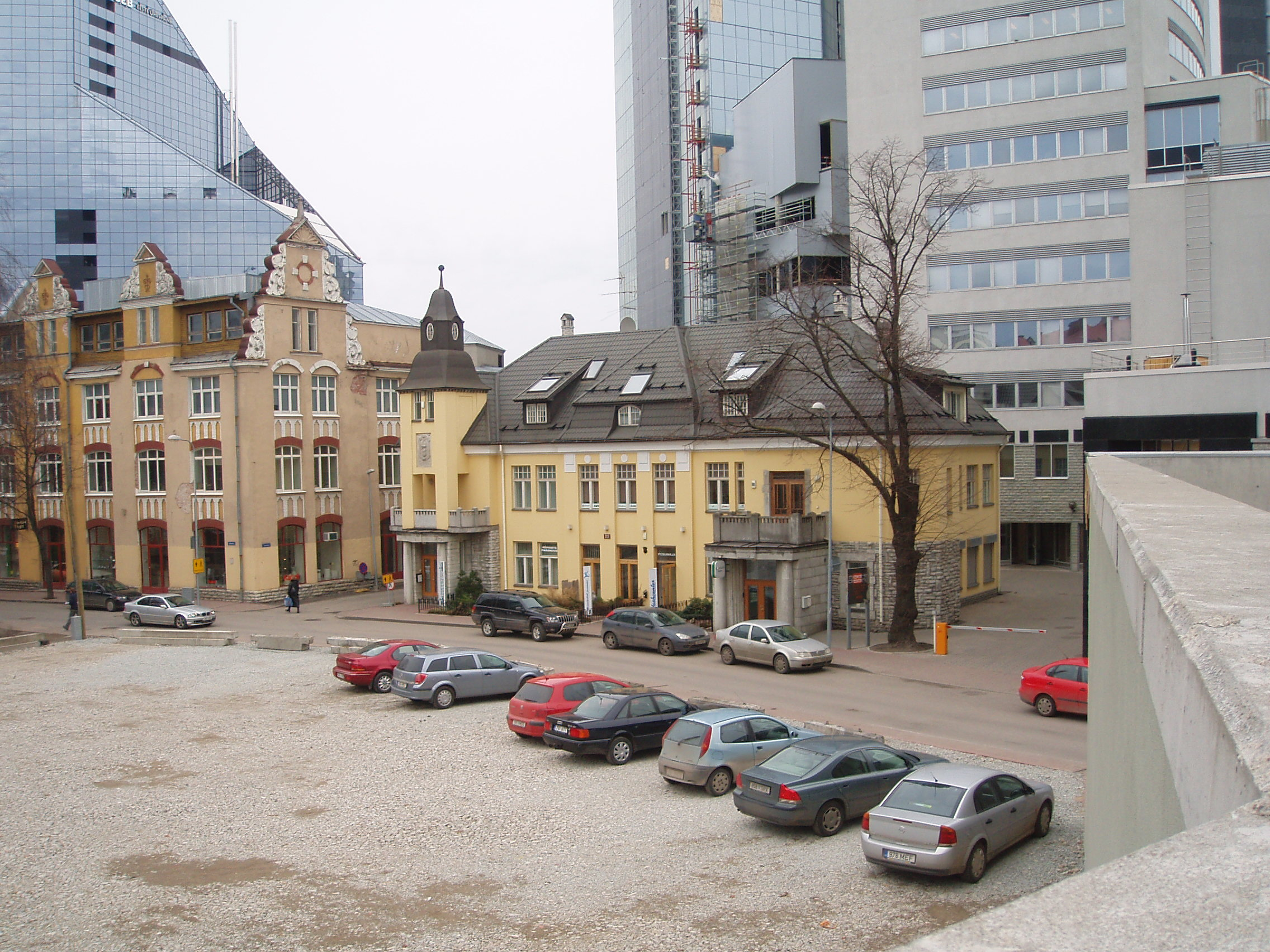
Maakri 23, built in 1910 and one of the best examples of art nouveau architecture in Tallinn

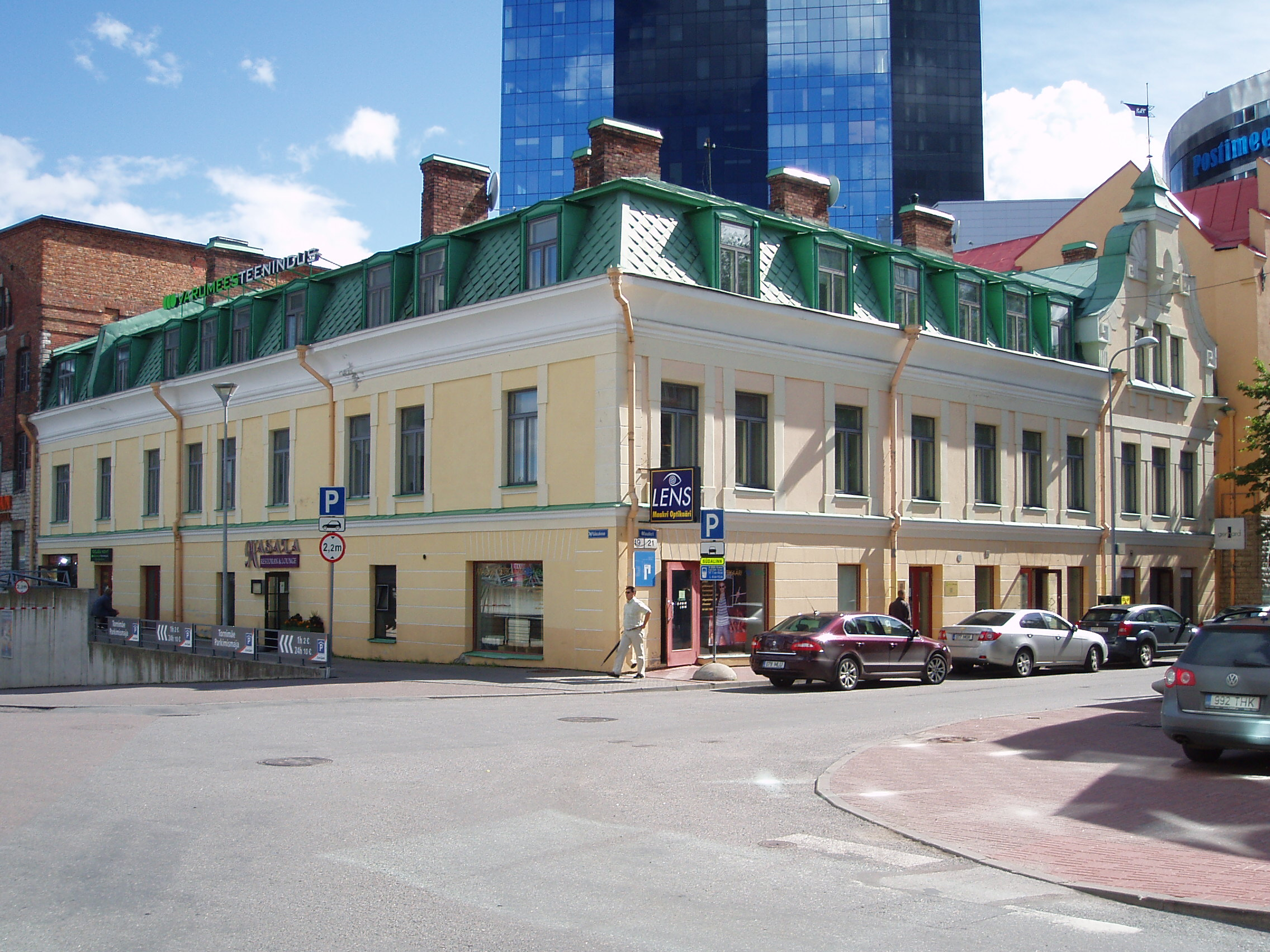
Maakri 19-21 was the location of the Theodor Grünwald's leather and footwear factory, later named "Union"

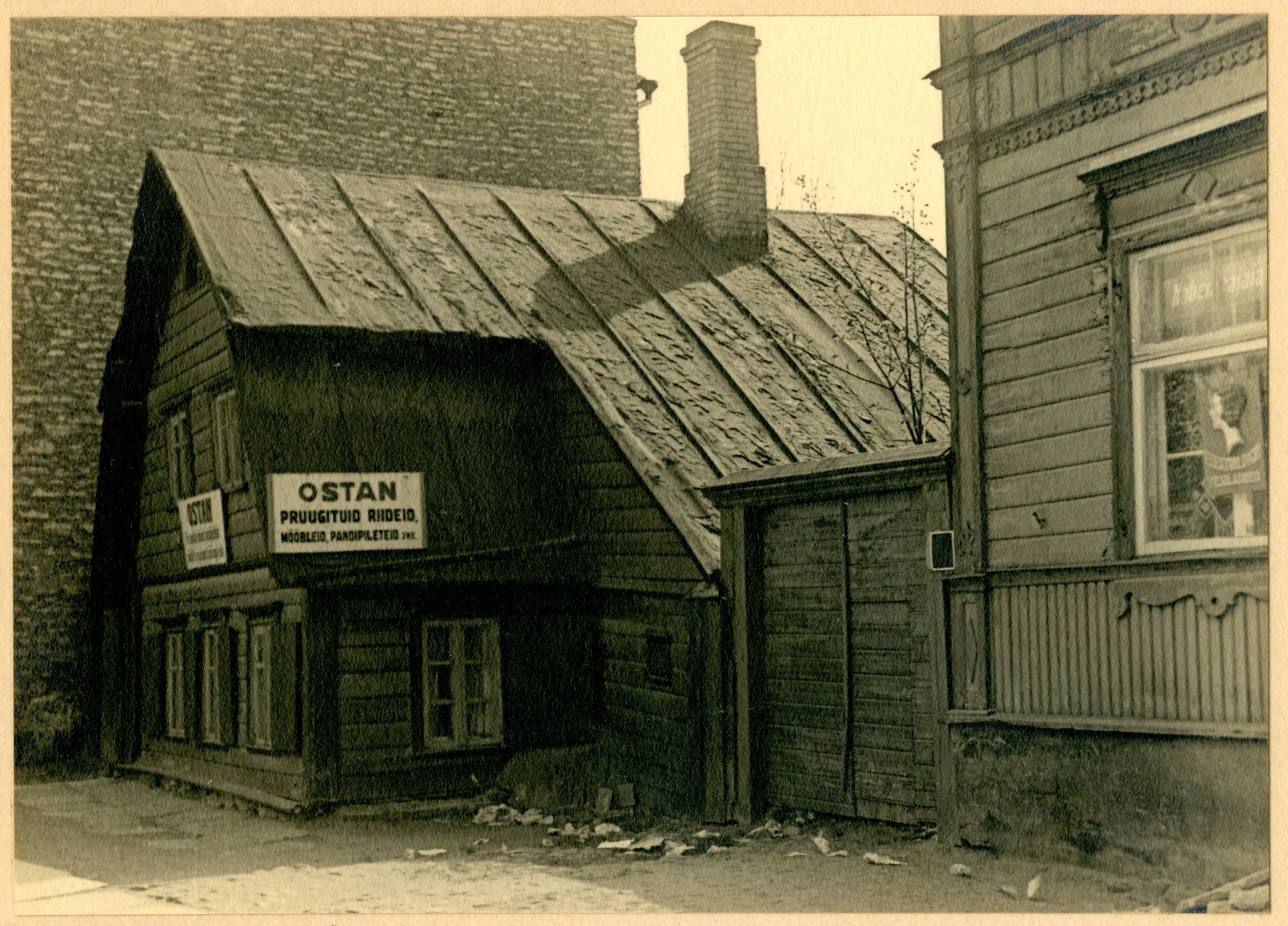
Wooden houses of Maakri in 1938

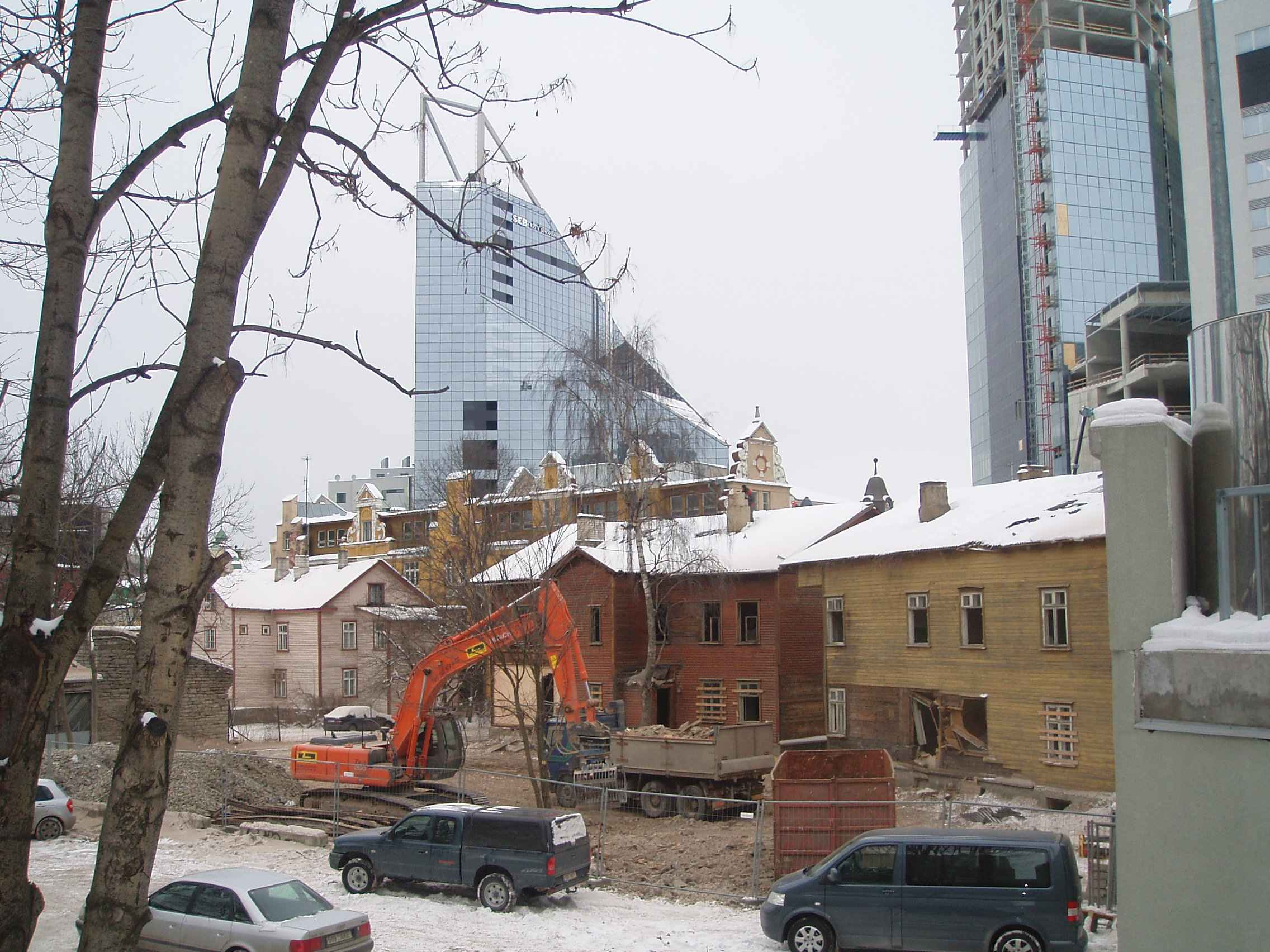
Old wooden houses of Maakri in 2006, majority of them have been demolished

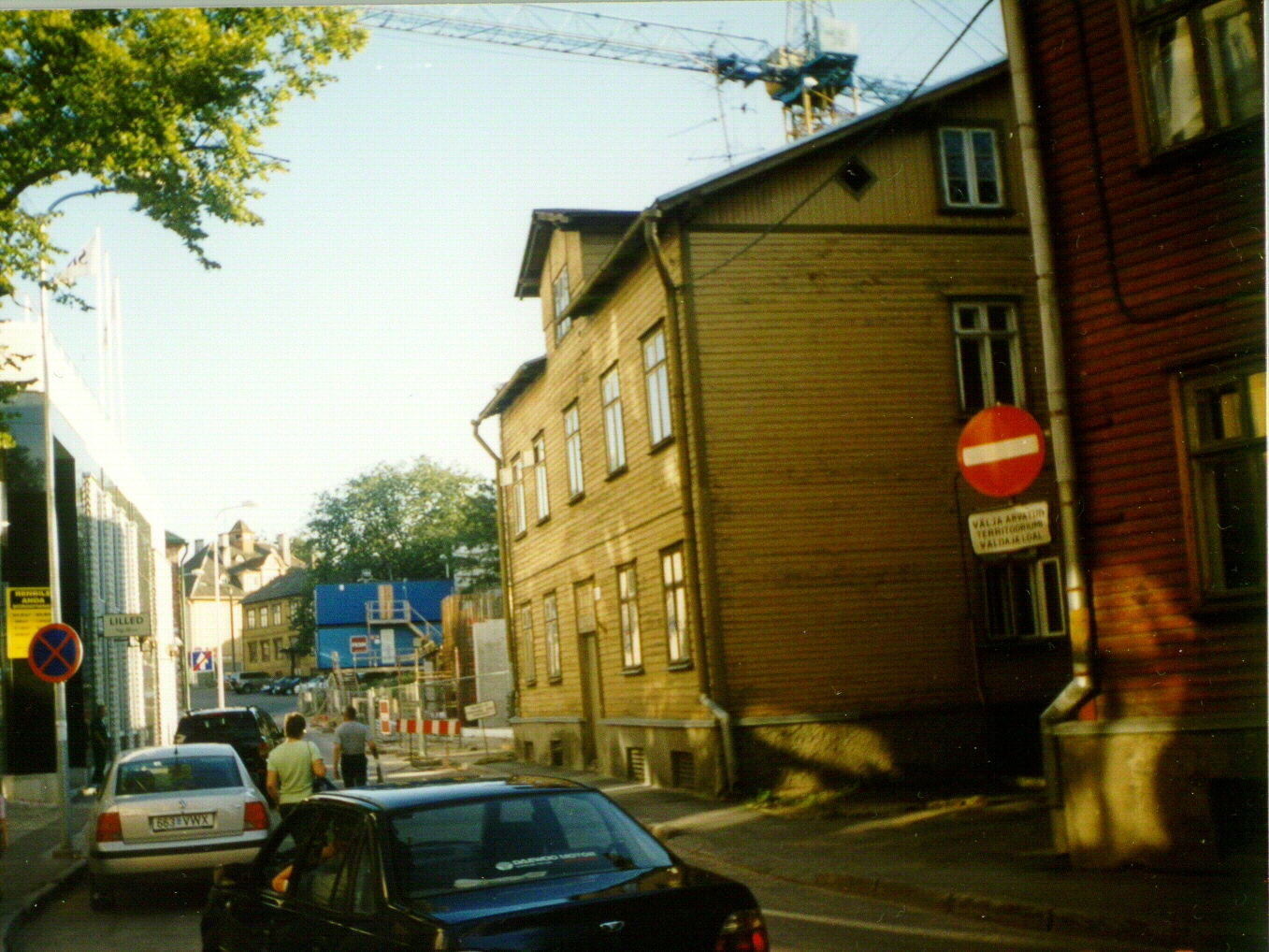
Wooden House in Maakri 34 on 8 August 2002

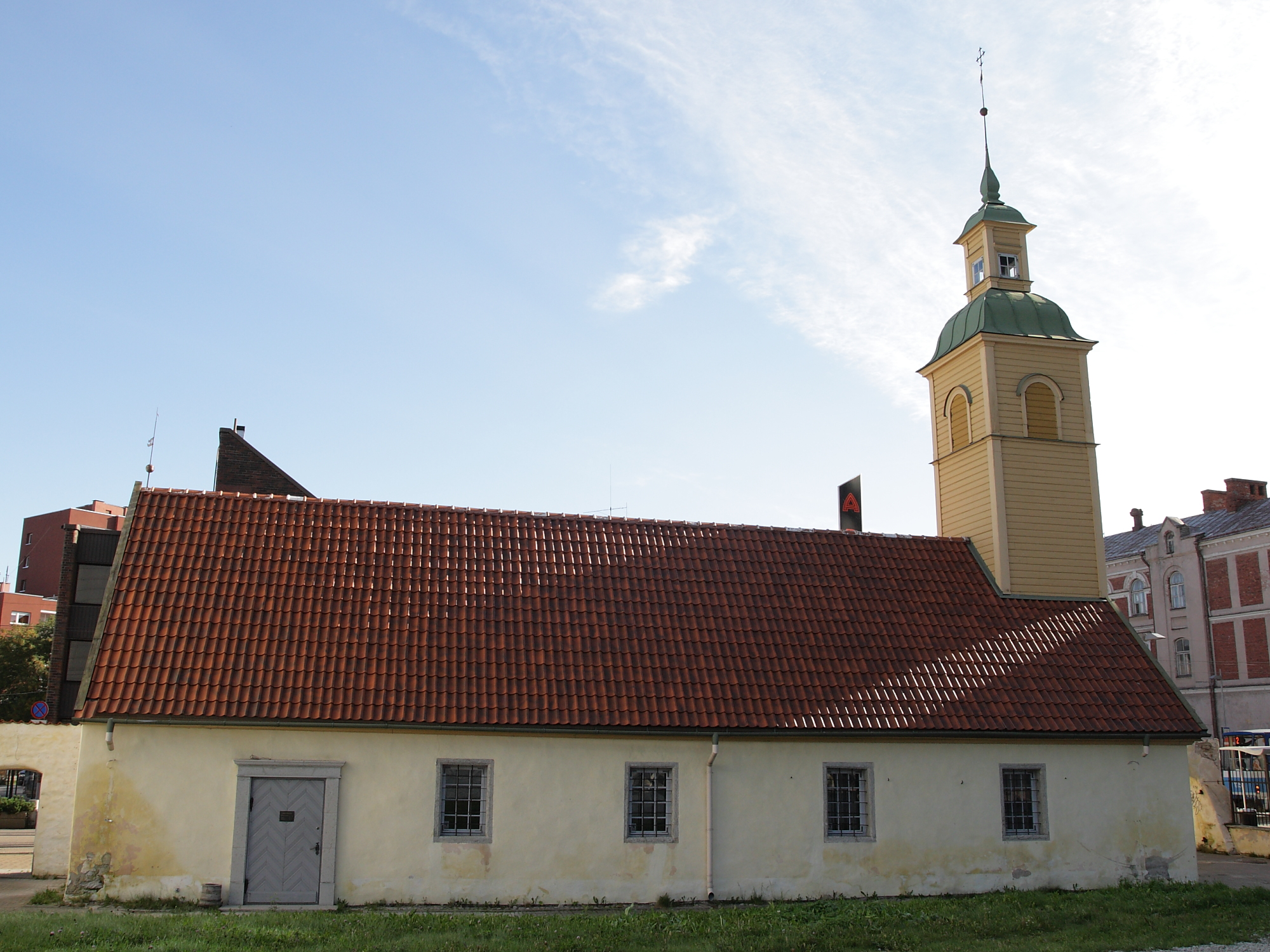
Church of St. John's almshouse from the 17th century.
Modern Maakri

Tallinn Rävala puiestee

The beginning of Tartu road, SEB headquarters on the left.

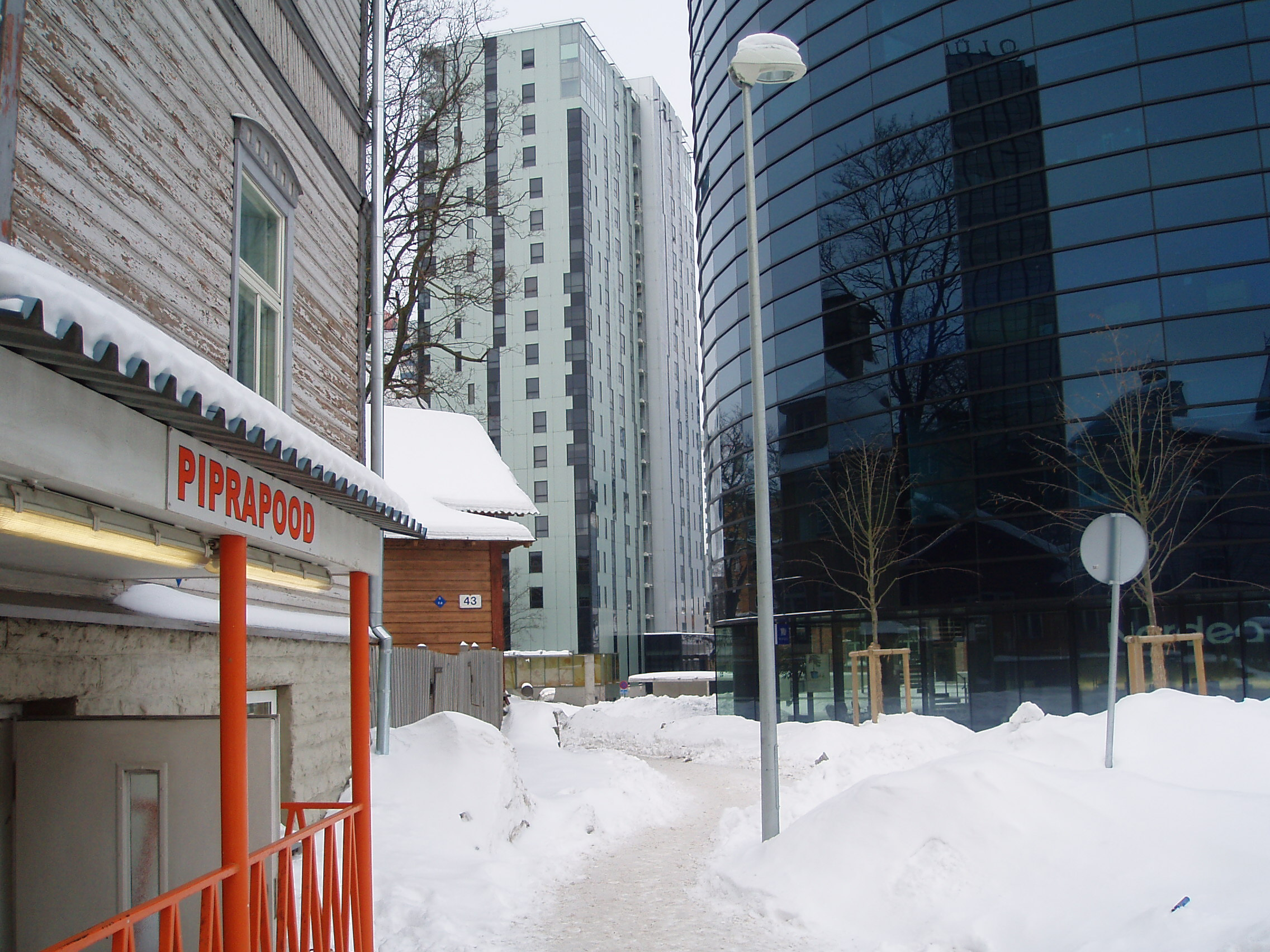
Maakri Maja in the winter of 2010

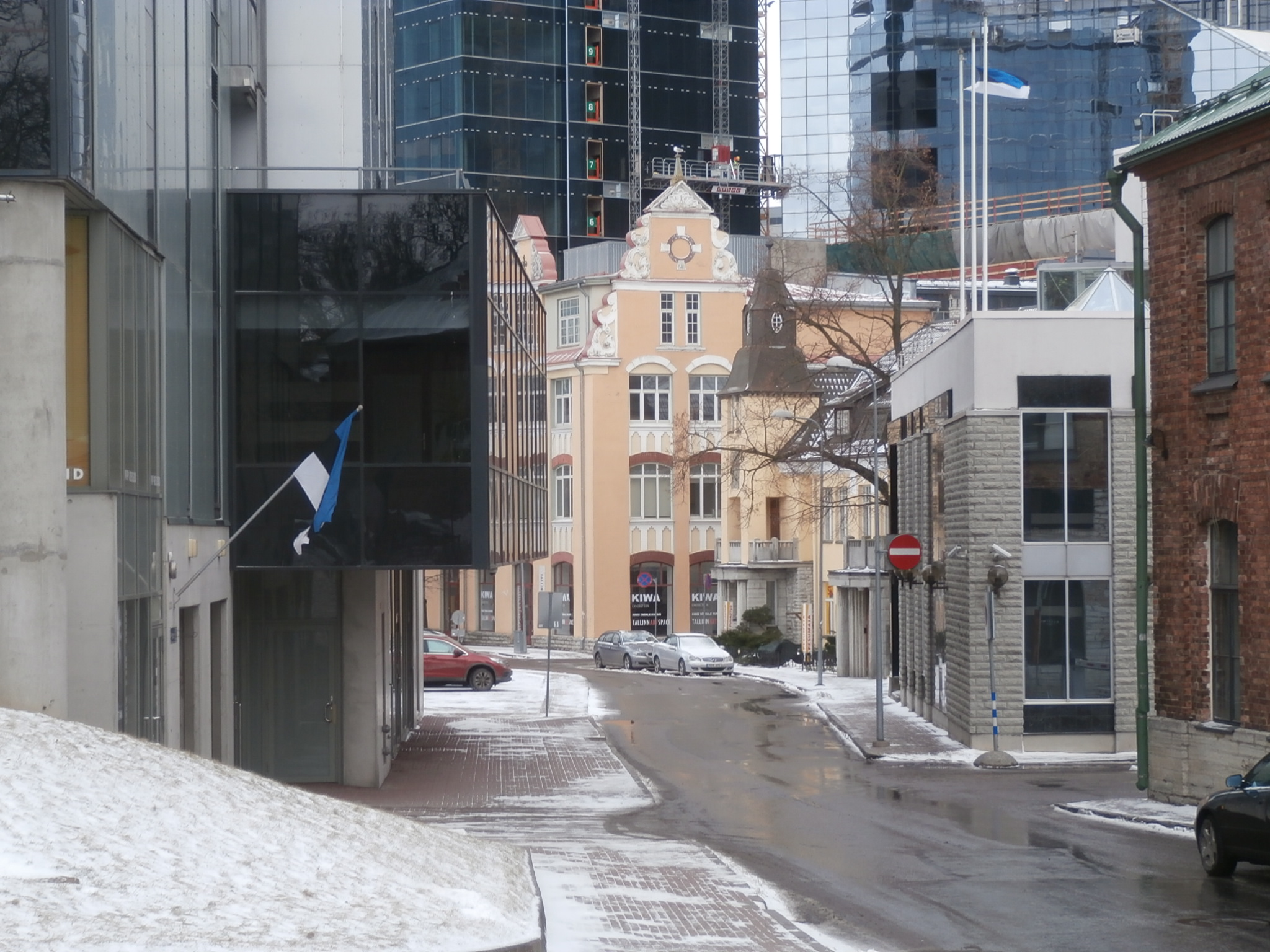
Estonian Flag on the Wall of Maakri 36 in Tallinn 24 February 2017

Maakri Kvartal
