= Skyon =

High-rise building in Tallinn

- Skyon lit up in Ukrainian colors, January 2023
- Interactive map of the Skyon area

General information
- Location: Tallinn, Estonia, Maakri 30
- Coordinates: 59°25′57.72″N 24°45′33.48″E
- Construction started: February 2019
- Opened: August 2021
- Owner: Capital Mill

Height
- Height: 95 m (312 ft)

Technical details
- Floor count: 26

Design and construction
- Architect: KOKO Arhitektid

Website
- https://skyon.eu/

Skyon is a 26-story and 95-metre (312 ft) office building in Tallinn, Estonia. Located in the Maakri district and opened in 2021, it serves as the headquarters for Coop Pank.

The facade of the building consists of 898 triangular and colourful glass panels, between which a total of nearly 4.5 kilometres of LED light strips have been installed.

In 2022, Skyon was awarded the internationally recognised LEED Platinum certificate.

== Tenants ==
Skyon is home to several IT, legal and financial firms. While its chief tenant is Coop Pank, it also serves as the headquarters for the real estate investment company Capital Mill, who itself are the developers and owners of the tower. The list of companies operating in Skyon also includes Arco Vara, BaltCap and Eesti Pangaliit.

== Gallery ==
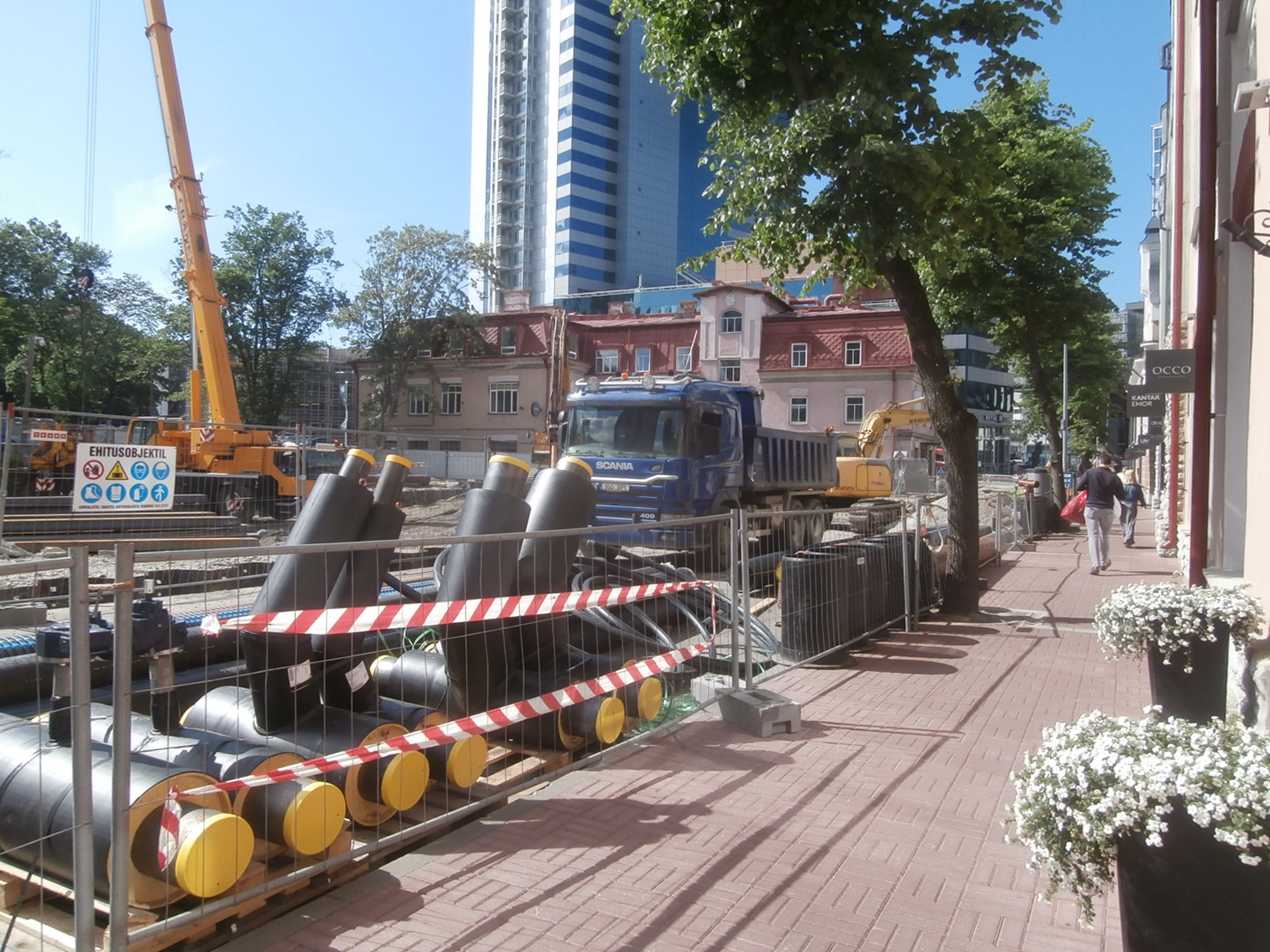
Skyon under construction in June 2019

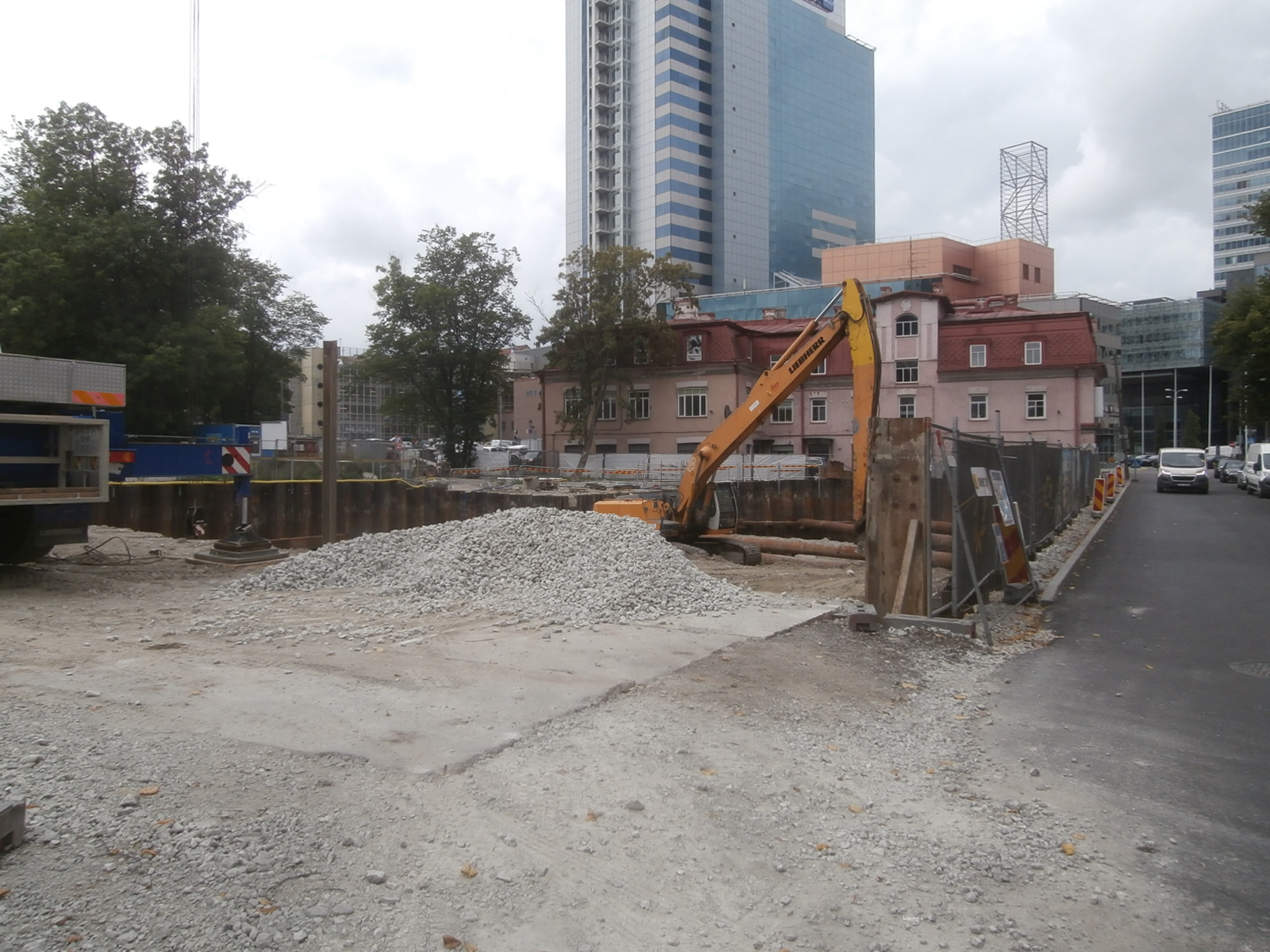
Skyon under construction in August 2019

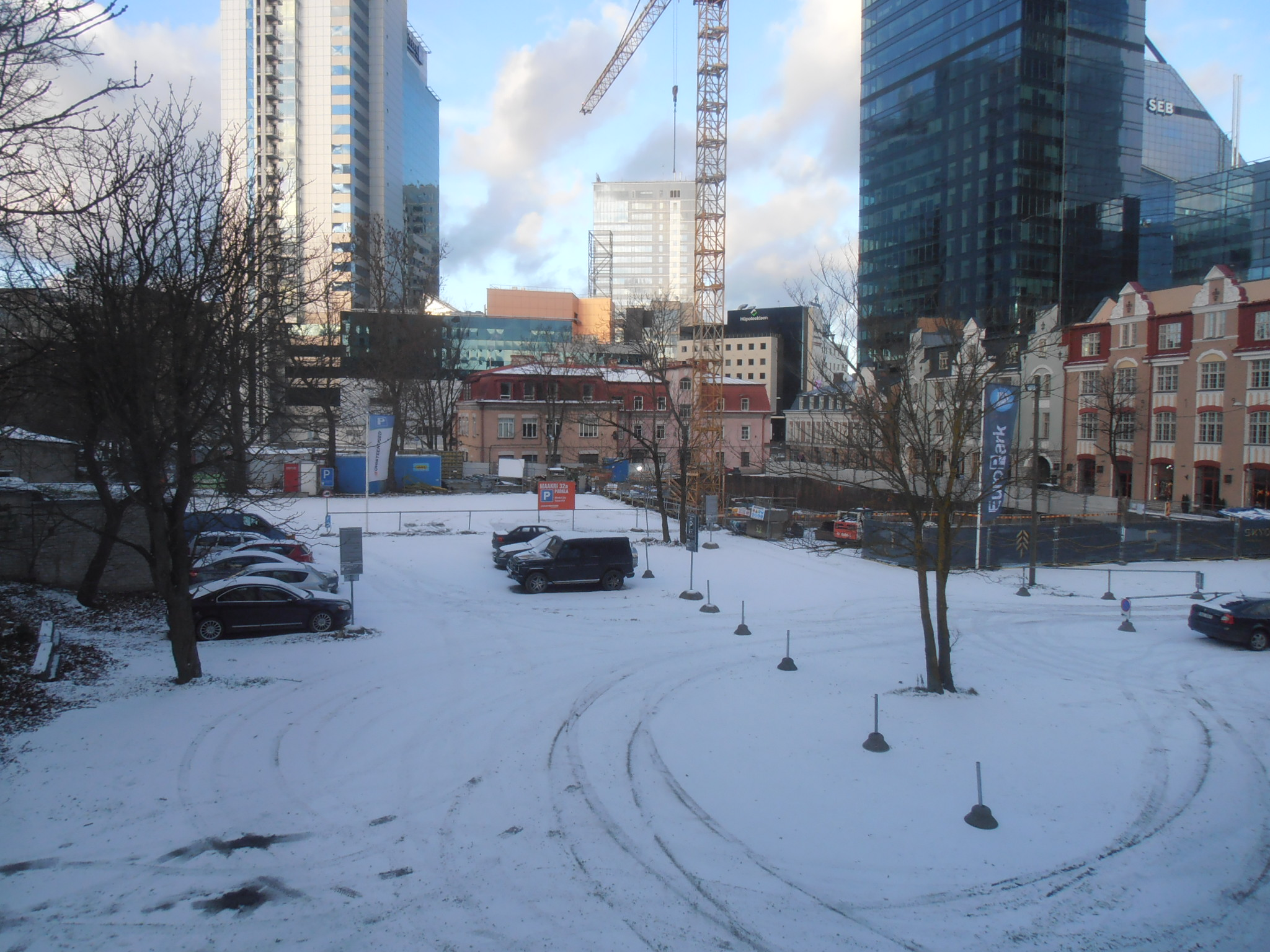
Skyon under construction in December 2019

Skyon under construction in February 2021

Skyon (on the right), next to Tornimäe 7 and Maakri Torn

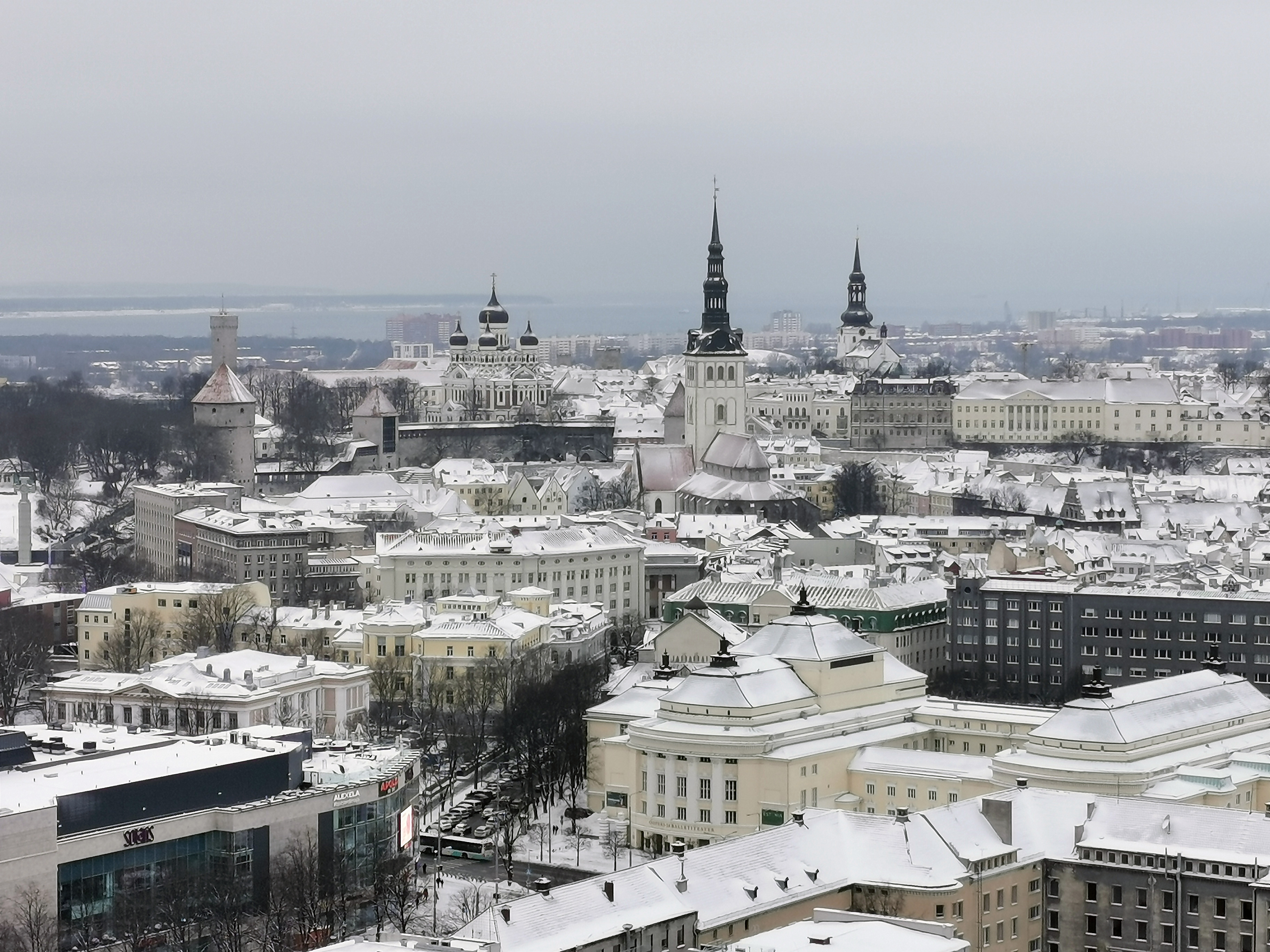
The city centre of Tallinn as seen from Skyon

== See also ==
- List of tallest buildings in Estonia
