= Arter Kvartal =

High-rise building complex in Tallinn

General information
- Status: Completed
- Location: Tallinn, Estonia
- Coordinates: 59°25′46.8″N 24°45′32.2″E
- Construction started: February 2021
- Opened: November 2024
- Cost: €160 million
- Owner: Kapitel

Height
- Roof: Tower A: 111 m (364 ft); Tower B: 63 m (207 ft); Tower C: 39 m (128 ft)

Technical details
- Floor count: Tower A: 28; Tower B: 15; Tower C: 9
- Floor area: 77,200 m^{2} (831,000 sq ft)

Design and construction
- Architect: Martin Aunin
- Developer: Kapitel
- Main contractor: Merko Ehitus

Website
- https://arter.ee/

Arter Kvartal (or Arter Quarter in English) is a high-rise building complex in Tallinn, Estonia. The quarter includes three buildings, with the main 28-story and 111-metre (364 ft) tower being the third-tallest building in Estonia. The complex was opened in November 2024 and cost over €160 million.

== Description ==
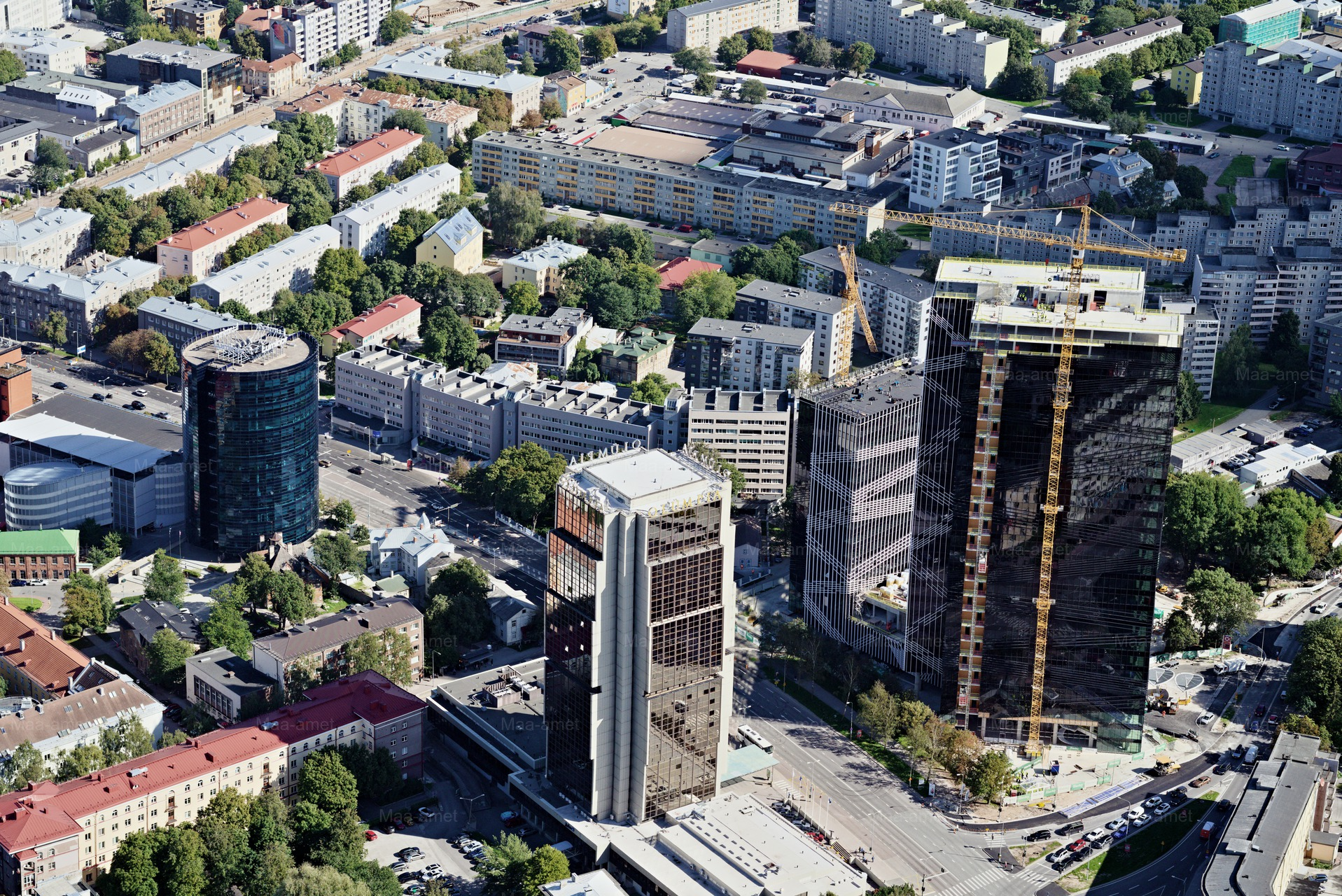
Arter Kvartal under construction in September 2023, with Hotel Olümpia next to it

The 111-metre tall main building is the headquarters of Swedbank AS. The 15-story and 63-metre Tower B serves as an office building and also facilitates a sports club and a spa. The 9-story and 39-metre Tower C serves an apartment hotel managed by Bob W. The three buildings of the quarter are connected by a glass-roofed atrium. The entire complex facilitates approximately 3,000 people.

Arter Kvartal is developed and owned by Estonian real estate company Kapitel.

The complex was awarded the 2024 'Estonian Real Estate Deed of the Year' by the Estonian Real Estate Companies Association.

== Gallery ==

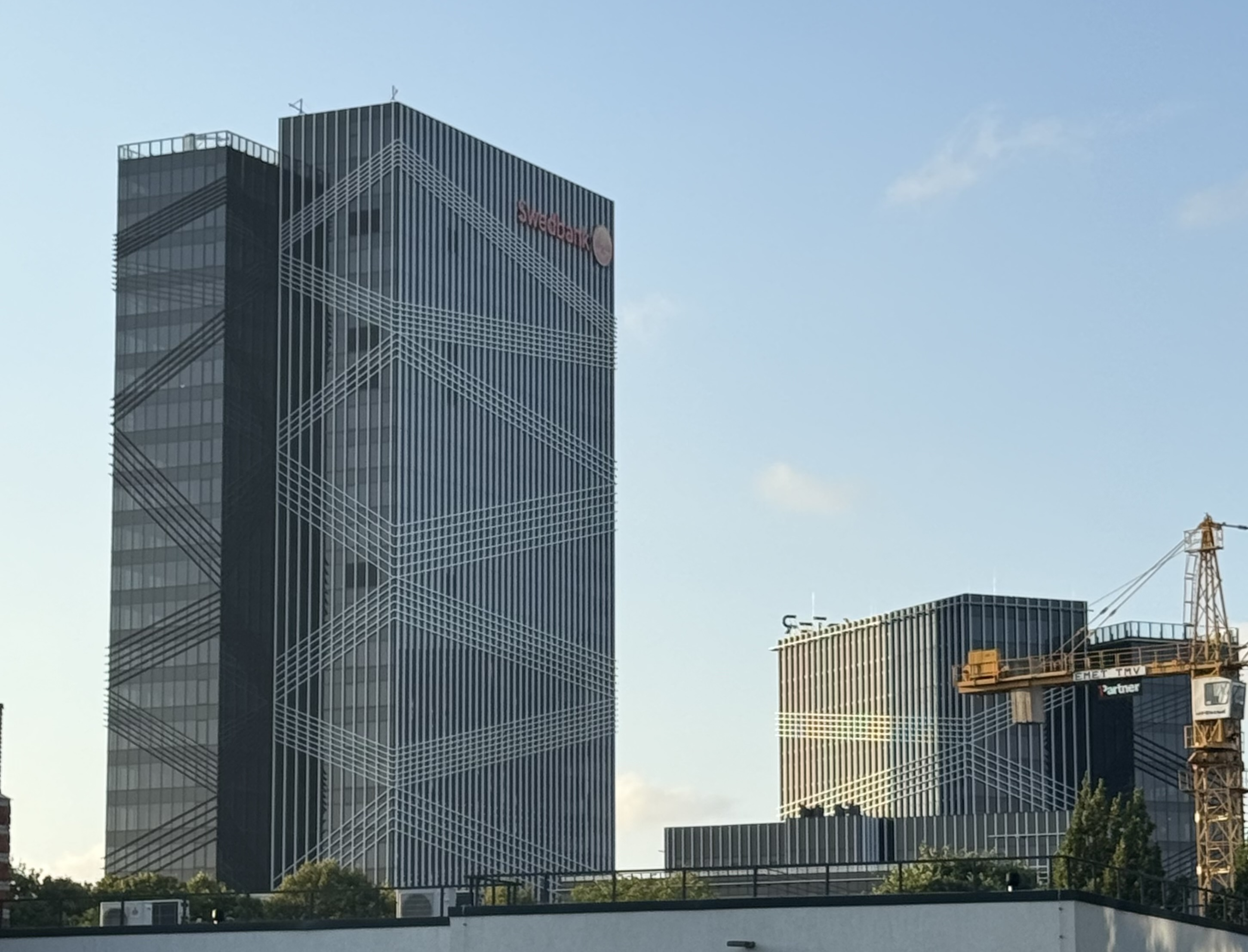

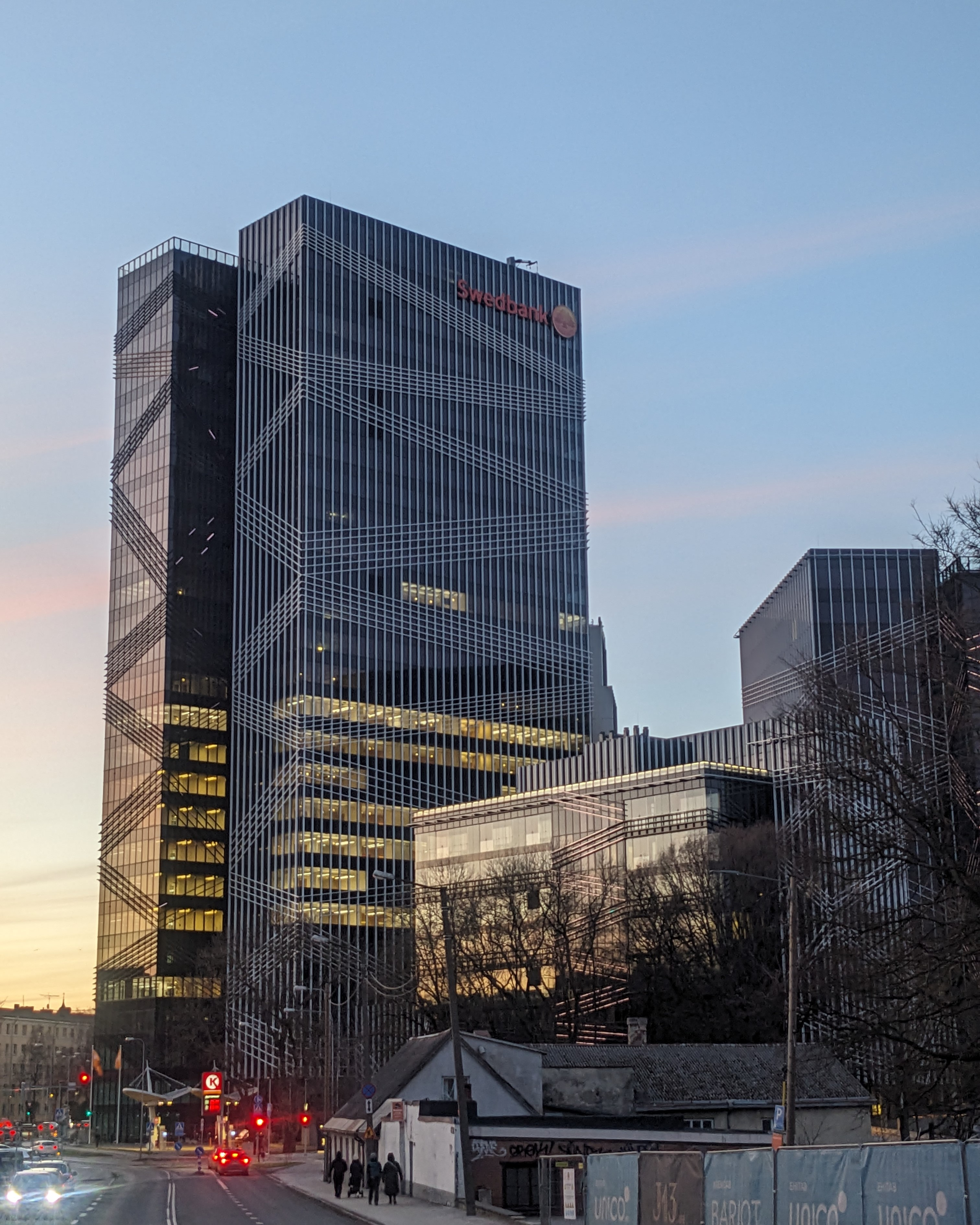

== See also ==
- List of tallest buildings in Estonia
