= List of tallest buildings in Tallinn =

Tallinn, the capital and largest city of Estonia, is home to 79 completed high-rises, 9 church spires, a defence tower (Pikk Hermann), Town Hall and 8 structures (including TV tower) taller than 45 metres (148 feet). 22 high-rises are located in the Midtown (Kesklinn), 57 high-rises are located in the outskirts, churches with one exception (Estonian Methodist Church) are found in the Old Town.

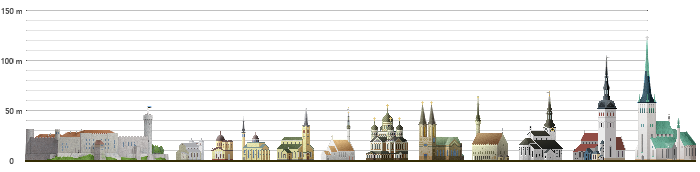
The tallest structures of the Old Town of the Estonia's capital city — Tallinn.

== List ==
	Height	Name	Floors
1.	314,00	Tallinn TV Tower	23
2.	130,00	Chimney of Kristiine Boilerhouse	-
3.	125,00	Chimney of Mustamäe Boilerhouse	-
4.	???,??	Chimney of Väo Power Plant	-
5.	123,70	St. Olaf's Church	-
6.	117,00	Swissôtel Tallinn	30
7.	116,98	Tornimäe Apartments	30
8.	110,00	Maakri Kvartal	30
9.	104,80	St. Nicholas' Church	-
10.	104,80	Radisson Blu Sky Hotel	24
11.	97,00	Kristiine Radio Mast	-
12.	94,40	Headquarters of SEB Eesti Ühispank	24
13.	87,00	Chimney of Tallinn Power Plant	-
14.	85,00	Chimney of Ülemiste Boilerhouse	-
15.	84,00	Radisson Blu Hotel Olümpia	26
16.	78,00	City Plaza	23
17.	69,00	St. Mary's Cathedral	-
18.	68,50	Sokos Hotel Viru	23
19.	64,10	Maakri Maja	20
20.	64,00	Town Hall	-
21. 22.	59,20; 59,20	Charles' Church	-
23.	56,00	Alexander Nevsky Cathedral	-
24.	56,00	Rocca Al Mare Office Building	16
25.	??,??	24 Lelle Street	16
26.	55,60	Osten Tor	16
27.	55,00	Fahle House	14
28.	55,00	Headquarters of Telia Eesti	16
29.	55,00	26F Pirita Road	16
30.	54,20	Nordea Maja	14
31.	53,20	Church of the Holy Spirit	-
32.	53,10	Novira Plaza	15
33.	52,40	6 Kentmanni Street	14
34. 35.	52,00; 52,00	Joint Building of Ministries	14; 14
36.	52,00	Postimehe Maja	14
37.	52,00	St. John's Church	-
38.	??,??	22 Lelle Street	14
39.	50,50	Delta Plaza	14
40.	46,00	Euroxi Maja	13
41.	45,60	Tall Hermann	-
