= Nordic Fibreboard =

Company based in Estonia

Nordic Fibreboard is an Estonian furniture company which focuses on fibreboard production.

The company was established in 1945 as Viisnurk. In 2012, the company bore the name Skano Group AS.

Since 1997, the company has been listed on the Nasdaq Tallinn (Secondary List).

In the autumn of 2019, the furniture factory Skano Furniture Factory OÜ was transferred and retail and wholesale of furniture were stopped. As of December 11, 2019, the new business name of Skano Group AS is Nordic Fibreboard AS.

In 2020, it was decided to close the Püssi fiberboard factory, only the Pärnu fiberboard factory and real estate development will continue.

The company has two subsidiaries: Nordic Fibreboard Ltd. (deals with the sale and production of fibreboards) and Pärnu Riverside Development OÜ (deals with real estate development).
