= PRFoods =

Company based in Estonia

PRFoods (earlier AS Premia Foods) is an Estonian fish farming, fish producing and fish selling company.

The company activities take place in Estonia, Finland, Sweden and Great Britain. In 2017, the company acquired John Ross Jr and Coln Valley Smokery, and after that the export markets have widened.

In Finland the company uses the brand name "Heimon". Since 2020s, the brand is also used in Estonia. In Great Britain and in other export markets the company uses the brand name John Ross Jr.

The company is established in 2008.

Since 2010, the company is listed in Nasdaq Tallinn.
