= OMX Tallinn =

Main stock market index in Estonia

The OMX Tallinn (OMXT) is the main stock market index in Estonia. It reflects changes in the prices of shares listed in the main and investor lists of the Estonian Stock Exchange, and the Tallinn Stock Exchange. It uses the Paasche Index Formula. The value of the index was calibrated to 100 on 3 June 1996. Before 2005 the index was known as TALSE.
