= EfTEN Real Estate Fund III =

Company based in Estonia

EfTEN Real Estate Fund III is an Estonian company which acts as a real estate fund for private investors.

The company has offices in Baltic states. Most of the company's revenue comes from retail premises, and geographically from Lithuania.

The company is established in 2015.

Since 2017, the company is listed in Nasdaq Tallinn.
