= Nasdaq Tallinn =

Estonian stock exchange in Tallinn

Coordinates: 59.4064°N 24.7926°E

- Type: Stock exchange
- Location: Tallinn, Estonia
- Founded: April 1995
- Owner: Nasdaq
- Key people: Kaarel Ots
- Currency: Euro
- Indices: OMX Tallinn
- Website: nasdaqbaltic.com

The Nasdaq Tallinn AS, formerly known as the Tallinn Stock Exchange, is a stock exchange operating in Tallinn, Estonia. Nasdaq Tallinn is the only regulated secondary securities market in Estonia. The major stock market index is Nasdaq Tallinn, formerly known as TALSE.

Stock exchanges (listing venues) owned by Nasdaq, Inc.

== History ==
The foundation of Estonian Central Securities Depository in 1994 created the basis for the development of the secondary market based on electronic trading system. This was realized with the founding of the Tallinn Stock Exchange in April 1995 by 10 commercial banks, 9 brokerage firms and state players (Hüvitusfond, Bank of Estonia, and Ministry of Finance), equal holding of each of them. Licensed by the Ministry of Finance, Tallinn Stock Exchange opened for trading on May 31, 1996, with 11 securities listed.

June 3 was the first calculation day for the TALSE index.

In 1999 September 24, The alliance of Nordic Exchanges (NOREX) formally invited Tallinn Stock Exchange, alongside Riga Stock Exchange and the National Stock Exchange of Lithuania, to start negotiations for the potential merger with the union.

In 2001 May 28, the Baltic exchanges and the NOREX officially announced that they suspended further cooperation.

In 2000 October, Tallinn Stock Exchange and Estonian CSD formed, based on the two companies, a group under single strategic management.

In 2001 April, HEX Group from Finland acquired strategic ownership in the Tallinn Stock Exchange Group. Trading in Estonian securities in the HEX trading system started on February 25, 2002.

In 2003 September 4, The first day of operations for OMHEX, the new parent company of HEX Tallinn, created by the merger of Swedish OM and Finnish HEX.

In 2004, as a result of merger between Finnish and Swedish securities market operators into OMX, the Tallinn Stock Exchange adopted new trading platform.

In 2007, the alternative market “First North” was launched.

In 2008, NASDAQ and OMX merged; NASDAQ OMX Group, Inc. was formed. OMX Tallinn became NASDAQ OMX Tallinn.

In 2014, NASDAQ OMX Group, Inc. changed its business name to Nasdaq, Inc. NASDAQ OMX Tallinn became Nasdaq Tallinn.

== Tradable securities ==
=== Main list ===
As of December 2025, there were 16 companies listed on the main list of Nasdaq Tallinn:

- Arco Vara (ARC1T)
- Coop Pank (CPA1T)
- EfTEN Real Estate Fund III (EFT1T)
- Ekspress Grupp (EEG1T)
- Harju Elekter (HAE1T)
- Hepsor (HPR1T)
- LHV Group (LHV1T)
- Merko Ehitus (MRK1T; previously MKO1T)
- Nordecon (NCN1T; previously Eesti Ehitus)
- Pro Kapital Grupp (PKG1T)
- Silvano Fashion Group (SFGAT; previously PTA Grupp, PTAAT)
- Tallink Grupp (TAL1T)
- Tallinna Kaubamaja Grupp (TKM1T)
- Tallinna Sadam (TSM1T)
- Tallinna Vesi (TVEAT)

=== Secondary List ===
As of December 2025, there were three companies listed on the Secondary List of Nasdaq Tallinn:

- Nordic Fibreboard (SKN1T)
- Trigon Property Development (TPD1T)
- PRFoods (PRF1T)

=== Bond List ===
As of December 2025, there were 26 corporate bond issues listed on the Bond List of Nasdaq Tallinn.

=== Fund List ===
As of December 2025, there were the units of two investment fund listed on Nasdaq Tallinn Fund List:

- Baltic Horizon Fund
- EfTEN United Property Fund

=== Nasdaq First North ===
As of August 2022, the securities of 12 companies were being traded on Nasdaq Tallinn First North market:

- Airbot Technologies (AIR)
- Bercman Technologies (BERCM)
- Cleveron Mobility (CLEV)
- Estonian Japan Trading Company (EJTC)
- ELMO Rent (ELMO)
- Hagen Bikes (HAGEN)
- Linda Nektar (LINDA)
- MADARA Cosmetics (MDARA)
- Modera (MODE)
- Punktid Technologies (PNKTD)
- Robus Group (ROBUS)
- Saunum Group (SAUNA)

== Trading Day ==
| Time | Trading phase |
|---|---|
| 09:00 – 10:00 | Period before Opening call auction (Pre-Open) |
| 10:00 | Opening call auction (Uncross) |
| 10:00 – 15:55 | Continuous trading |
| 15:55 – 16:00 | Period before Closing call auction (Pre-Close) |
| 16:00 | Closing call auction (Uncross) |
| ~16:00 – 16:30 | Post – trading session |
| 16:30 – 09:00 | Market closed |

=== Formerly listed companies ===
- Baltika (BLT1T)
- Eesti Telekom (ETLAT)
- Eesti Ühispank
- Enefit Green (EGR1T)
- Estiko
- Hansapank
- Kalev (KLV1T), later Luterma AS
- Norma (NRM1T)
- Olympic Entertainment Group (OEG1T)
- Saku Õlletehas (SKU1T)
- AS Starman (SMN1T)
- Tallinna Farmaatsiatehas (TFA1T)

== See also ==
- List of stock exchanges
- List of European stock exchanges
- Nasdaq Copenhagen
- Nasdaq Stockholm
- Nasdaq Helsinki
- Nasdaq Vilnius
- Nasdaq Riga
- Nasdaq Iceland
