= Arco Vara =

Arco Vara AS
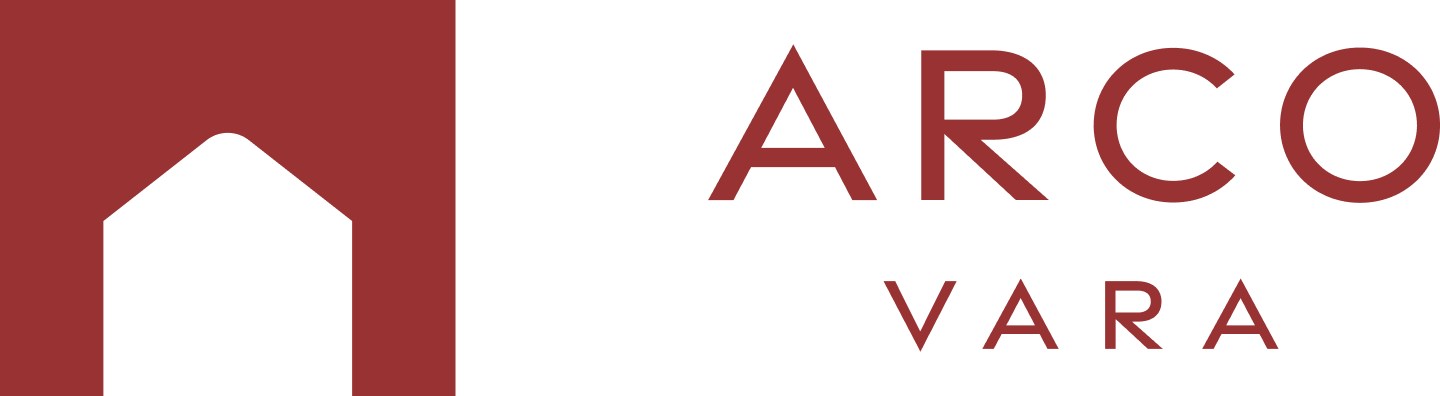
- Type: Public limited company
- Traded as: ARC1T
- Industry: Real estate development
- Founded: 1992
- Founder: Arti Arakas
- Headquarters: Rotermanni tn 10, Tallinn, Estonia
- Area served: Estonia and Bulgaria
- Key people: Kert Keskpaik (CEO); Tarmo Sild (Chairman of the Supervisory Board)
- Services: Development of integrated residential environments and related commercial real estate
- Revenue: €7.685 million (2025)
- Operating income: €0.195 million (2025)
- Net income: €0.479 million (2025)
- Website: https://arcovara.com/

Arco Vara AS is an international real estate group established in Estonia in 1992. The company operates mainly in Estonia and Bulgaria.

The main activity of Arco Vara is the development of complete living environments, along with associated commercial real estate. In addition, the group generates licensing revenue through agreements with real estate agencies operating under its trademarks in Estonia, Latvia, and Bulgaria.

Arco Vara AS has been listed on Nasdaq Tallinn Stock Exchange since 2007.

The CEO of Arco Vara AS is Kert Keskpaik.

== Financial information ==
As of 30 June 2026, Arco Vara had a total of 6,980 shareholders, including 6,427 retail shareholders, whose ownership in the company amounted to 10.6%.

In September 2025, Arco Vara issued bonds with a nominal value of 100 euros and an annual interest rate of 8.8% in the total amount of 15 million euros. The initial bond offering with a base size of 10 million euros was oversubscribed approximately 2.2 times, making it the largest single bond issue among Baltic listed real estate developers.

== Major shareholders ==
As of 30 June 2026, 81.31% of Arco Vara shares were held by the following major shareholders:

Major shareholders as of 30 September 2025
Name	Number of shares	Ownership (%)
Alarmo Kapital OÜ	9 163 104	52.76%
Luther Factory OÜ	1 618 926	9.32%
Luther Factory Holding OÜ	1 570 001	9.04%
FIREBIRD REPUBLICS FUND LTD 1	329 357	1.90%
Aia Tänav OÜ	229 000	1.32%
Marko Teimann	200 029	1.15%
FIREBIRD AVRORA FUND, LTD.	176 703	1.02%
Total	14 122 010	81.31%

== Financial indicators ==
The development of Arco Vara AS financial indicators in recent years:

Key financial indicators
Year	Revenue	Net profit	Total assets
2025	€7,477,000	€195,000	€86,236,000
2024	€7,477,000	€68,000	€39,568,000
2023	€18,339,000	€3,940,000	€35,190,000
2022	€13,494,000	€1,062,000	€39,805,000
