= Silvano Fashion Group =

Company based in Estonia

Silvano Fashion Group is an Estonian company which focuses on designing, manufacturing and selling of ladies' lingerie.

In total, the company has six lingerie, beachwear and underwear brands: Milavitsa, Lauma Lingerie, Alisee, Avelin and Laumelle for ladies and Hidalgo underwear for men. The company has shops in 23 countries.

The company was established in 1944.

Since 1997, the company is listed in Nasdaq Tallinn, at the beginning (since 1997) in the I-List and since 2006, in the Main List.

In 2011, AS PTA Grupp started bankruptcy proceedings.

Since about 2020, the company has had over 2000 employees in five countries.
