= Olympic Entertainment Group =

Company based in Estonia

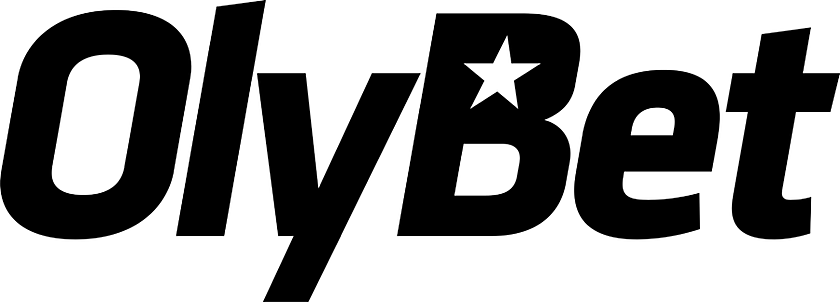
- Formerly: Olympic Entertainment Group AS
- Traded as: Nasdaq Tallinn: OEG1T (2006–2018)
- Industry: Gaming services
- Founded: 1993
- Founder: Sander Andreas Pall
- Fate: Acquired by Odyssey Europe AS and delisted in 2018
- Parent: Odyssey Europe AS
- Website: https://www.olympic-casino.com/group

Olympic Entertainment Group (OEG) was an Estonian concern which focused on entertainment business. The Group operated casinons and betting services in the Baltic States and other European countries (in Italy, Malta, Slovakia and Croatia).

The company's board members were Indrek Jürgenson since October 1, 2009 and Madis Jääger since December 27, 2010.

== History ==
In March 2018, the Luxembourg-based holding Novalpina, through its subsidiary Odyssey Europe AS, offered to buy all the shares of Olympic Entertainment Group. The takeover bid, which reached 288 million euros, was accepted by the board of OEG. The company was delisted from the Nasdaq Tallinn in October 2018, and a new CEO, Corey Plummer, was appointed the following month.

In April 2020, OEG signed an exclusive deal with GGNetwork.

In 2018, Olympic Entertainment Group was acquired by Odyssey Europe AS, a company backed by Novalpina Capital. Following the takeover, the company was delisted from Nasdaq Tallinn and merged into Odyssey Europe AS.

== Description ==
As of December 2018, the group had a total of 114 casinos and 23 betting points: 24 casinos in Estonia, 52 in Latvia, 17 in Lithuania, 6 in Slovakia, 14 in Italy and 1 in Malta.

As of 2019, by revenue of 30 million euros, the Group is 8th in Estonia.

The group employed 2852 people in 6 countries.

It was listed on the Tallinn Stock Exchange (now Nasdaq Tallinn) under the ticker symbol OEG1T following its initial public offering in October 2006. The company remained listed on the Baltic Main List until its shares were delisted on 16 November 2018 following a takeover by Odyssey Europe AS.
