= Harju Elekter =

Company based in Estonia

Harju Elekter (or Harju Elekter Group) is an Estonian company which deals mainly with manufacturing of MV/LV electrical equipment.

The company traces its history back to 1968, when electrical equipment began to be produced in Keila.

== Subsidiaries ==
The Group's subsidiaries are as follows:

- Harju Elekter Elektrotehnika
- Satmatic Oy (Finland)
- Finnkumu Oy (Finland)
- Harju Elekter UAB (Lithuania)
- Harju Elekter AB (Sweden)
- Harju Elekter Kiinteistöt Oy
- Energo Veritas OÜ
- Telesilta Oy
- SEBAB AB
- Grytek AB.

As of 2019, by revenue of 29.1 million euros, the Group is 10th in Estonia. In 2020, the company earned sales revenue of 146.6 million euros, of which 85% came from the sale of electrical equipment. Operating profit was 6.5 million and net profit was 5.6 million euros.

Since 1997, the Group is listed in Nasdaq Tallinn.
