= Baltika Group =

Company based in Tallinn

- Type: Public
- Industry: Clothing
- Founded: 1928
- Headquarters: Tallinn, Estonia
- Key people: Brigitta Albertin (CEO)
- Website: www.baltikagroup.com

The Baltika Group (Estonian: Baltika Grupp) is an Estonian fashion brandhouse and retailer that operates the contemporary women's brand Ivo Nikkolo. The group has stores in Estonia, Latvia and Lithuania. Ivo Nikkolo products are also sold in the Weekend e-store across the Baltics. In October 2025, the company filed for bankruptcy.

== History ==
The company was established in 1928 in Tallinn as a raincoat manufacturer and bore the name Gentleman. In 1959, the company was restructured and given the name Baltika. The company was one of the first privatized in Estonia at the beginning of 1990's.

In the years 1946–1960, it was called the Tallinn Sewing Factory, in the years 1960–1970, the Baltika Sewing Factory, and in the years 1970–1991, the Baltika Sewing Production Team.

After 1992 Baltika Group (Estonian: Baltika Grupp) grew into the biggest Estonian fashion brandhouse and retailer that operated Monton, Mosaic, Baltman, Bastion and Ivo Nikkolo retail concepts. Since May 2013, Baltika also represented Blue Inc London fashion brand in the Baltics. Group brands have been represented in Estonia, Latvia, Lithuania, Russia, Belarus, Ukraine, Serbia and Germany. Until 2023 Baltika was listed in the Tallinn Stock Exchange.

On October 2, 2025, AS Baltika announced that it had filed for bankruptcy, intensifying its operations in Latvia, Estonia and Lithuania, as well as closing its online stores. A total of 120 office and store employees will be laid off during the bankruptcy process, of which 70 work in Estonia, 21 in Latvia, and 29 in Lithuania.
