= Maakri 19/21 =

Skyscraper in Tallinn

Maakri Kvartal
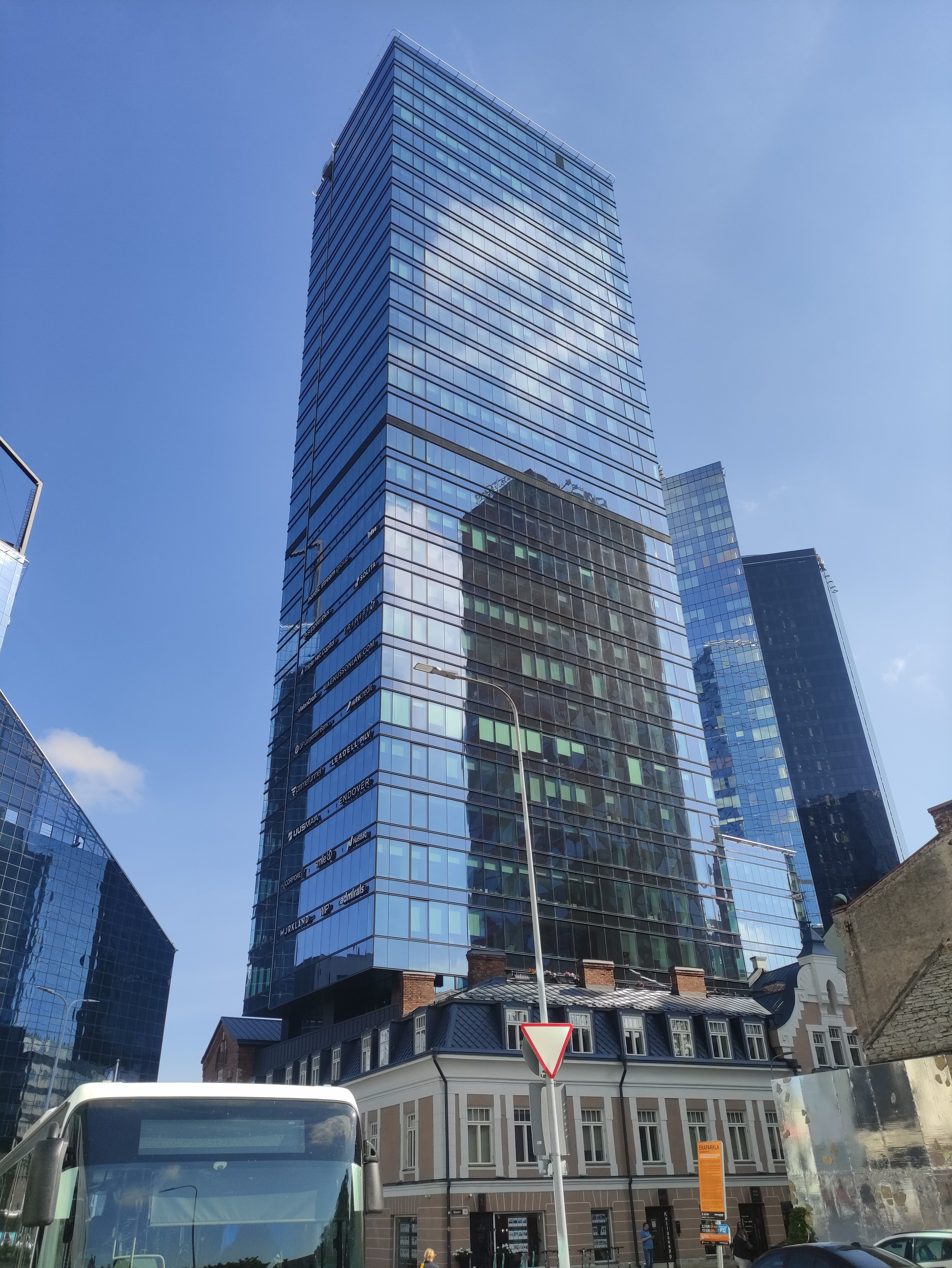

General information
- Status: Completed
- Type: Office
- Location: Tallinn, Estonia
- Coordinates: 59.433°N 24.760°E
- Construction started: March 2016
- Completed: 2018
- Cost: €50 million
- Owner: Olav Miil

Height
- Roof: 110 m (361 ft)

Technical details
- Floor count: 30
- Floor area: 36,000 m^{2} (390,000 sq ft)

Design and construction
- Architect: Rasmus Tamme
- Main contractor: Merko Ehitus

Maakri Kvartal, also known as Maakri Torn, is a skyscraper in Estonia. It is located in the Maakri district of Estonia's capital, Tallinn.

The complex consists of seven buildings: a 30-story and 110-metre office tower, two new 10- and 4-story buildings and four architectural monuments dating back to the beginning of the 20th century. The project was developed by Estonian businessman Olav Miil and cost 50 million euros.

== Architecture ==
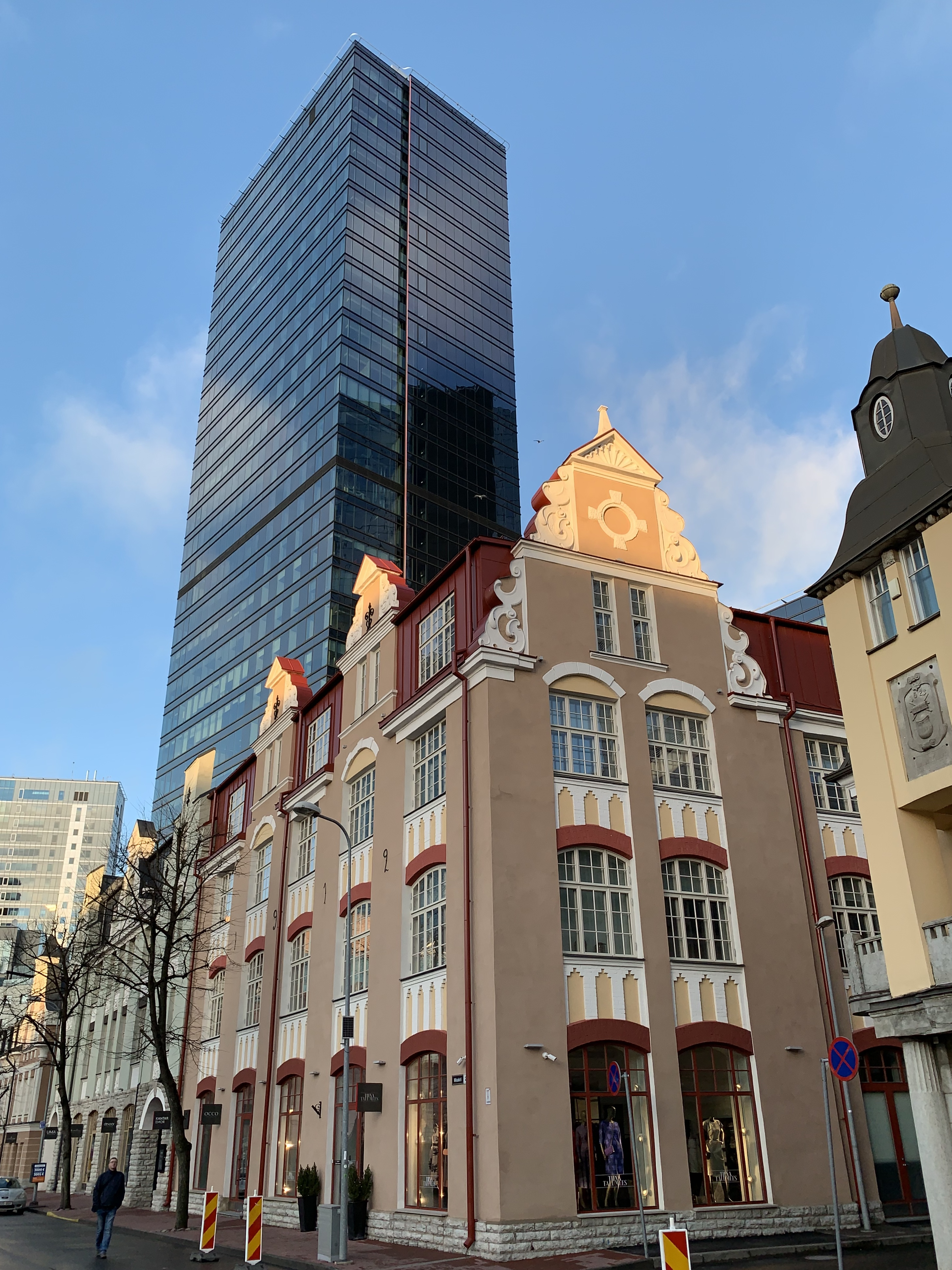
Maakri Torn and the Art Nouveau buildings

Maakri Kvartal's 110-metre tower is built between four over 100-year-old Art Nouveau style buildings that are also official cultural heritage monuments. During the 20th century, the historic buildings housed Theodor Grünwald's leather and footwear factory, later named "Union".

The street space is dominated by the renovated or restored Art Nouveau buildings, including the longest Art Nouveau façade in Tallinn designed by Baltic German architect Jacques Rosenbaum. Viewed from a distance, the combination of the 'new and old' gives an impression that the modern glass facade of the office tower is growing out of the historic sections.

== Gallery ==
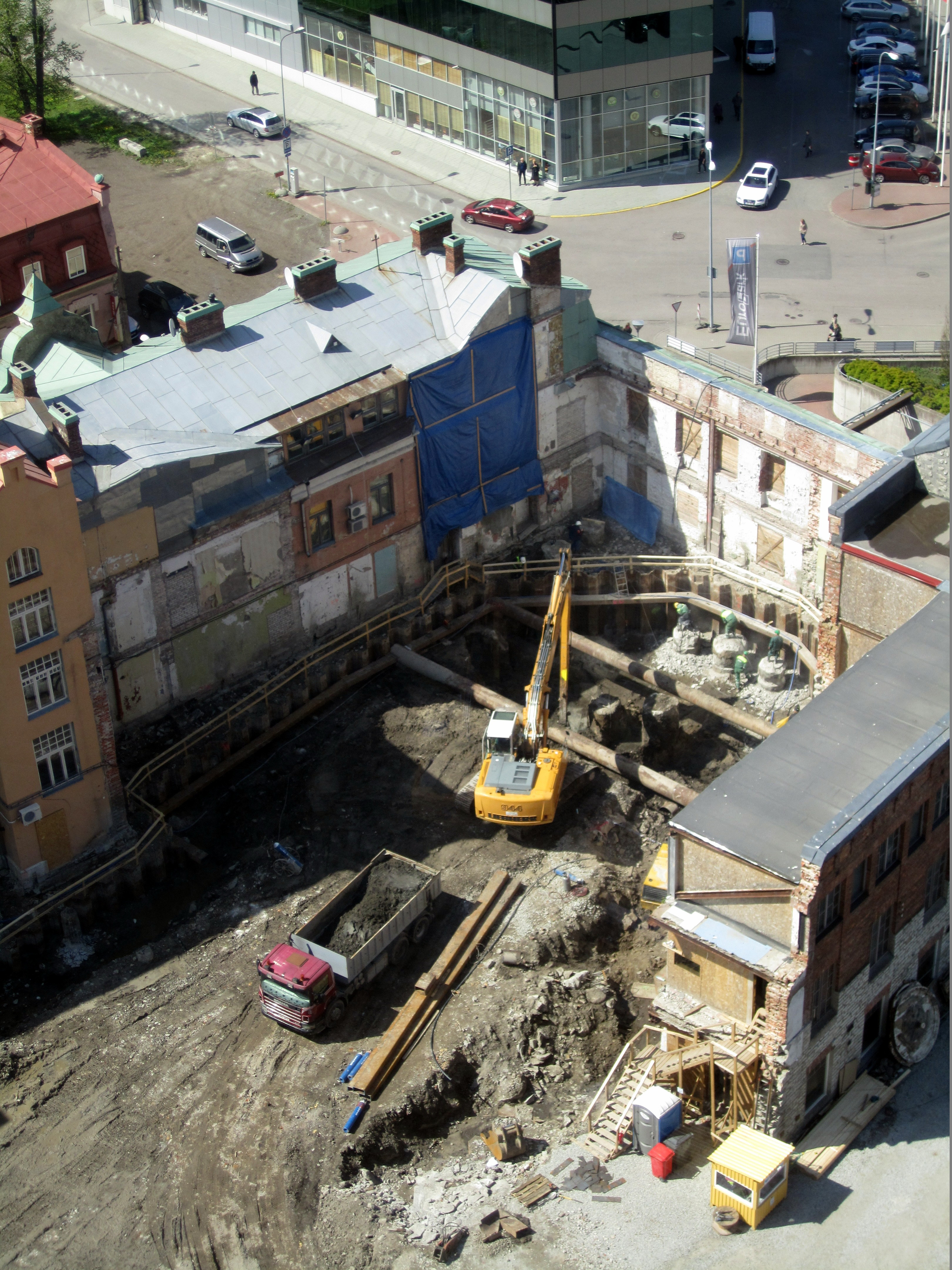

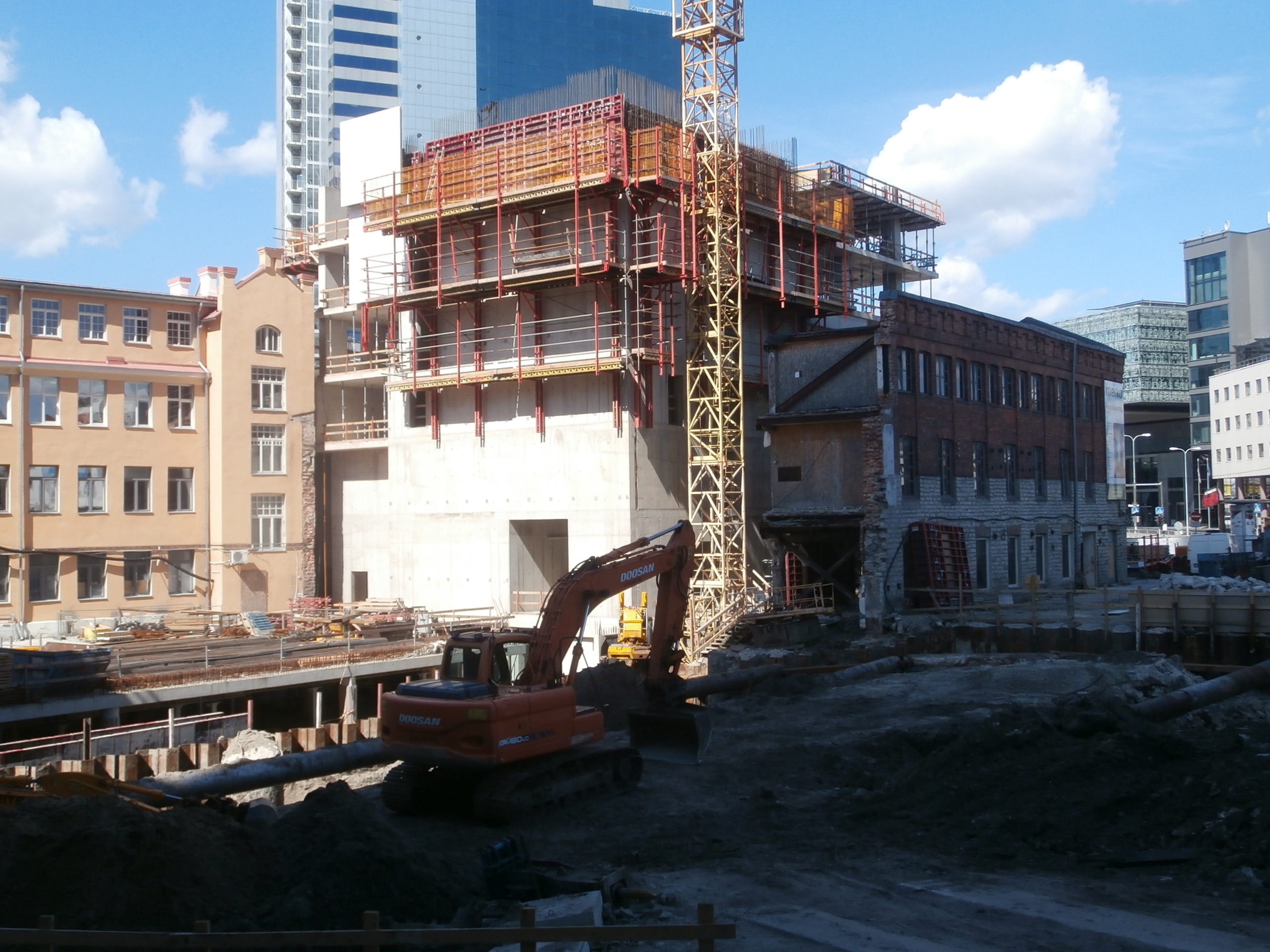

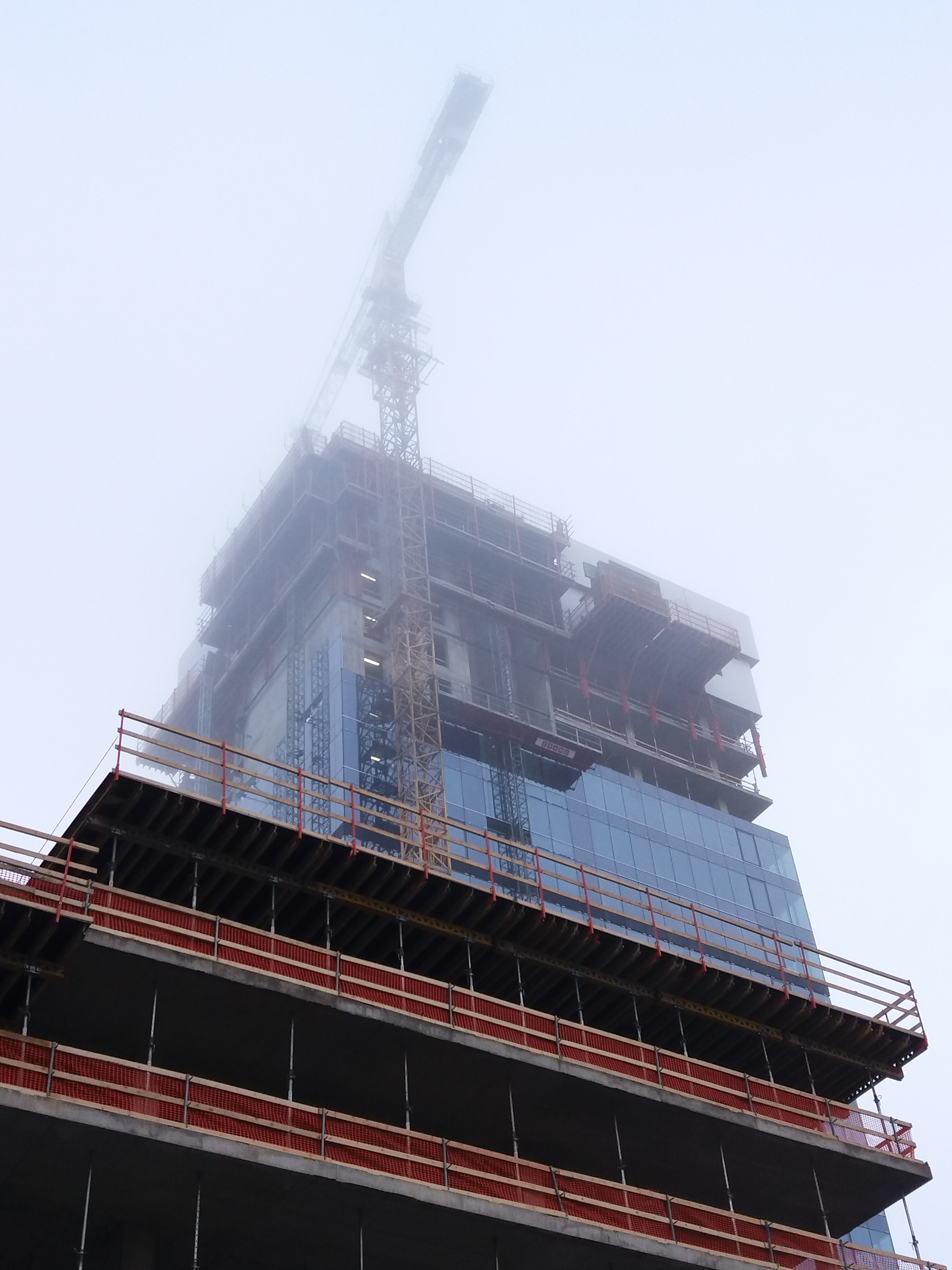

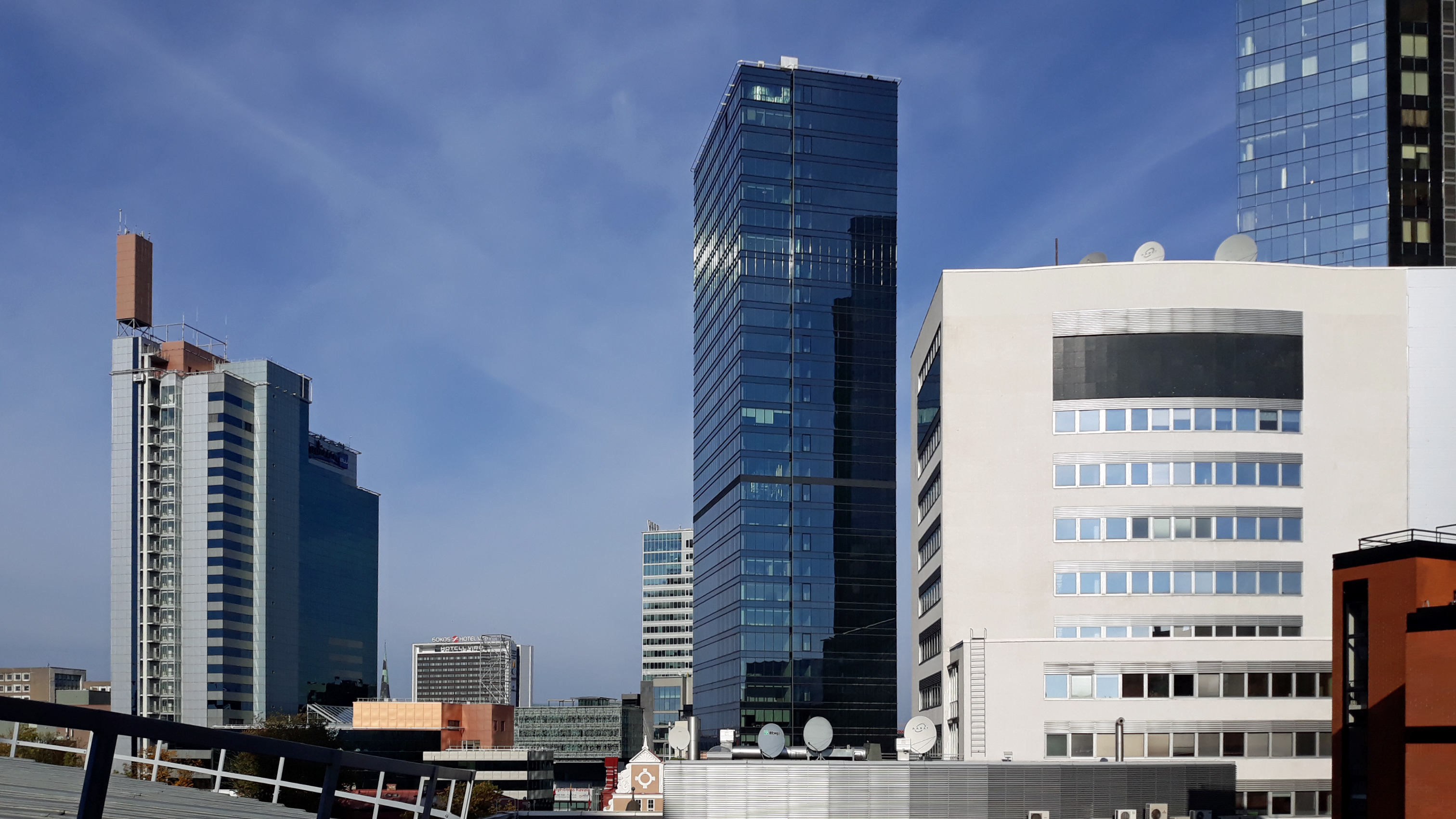

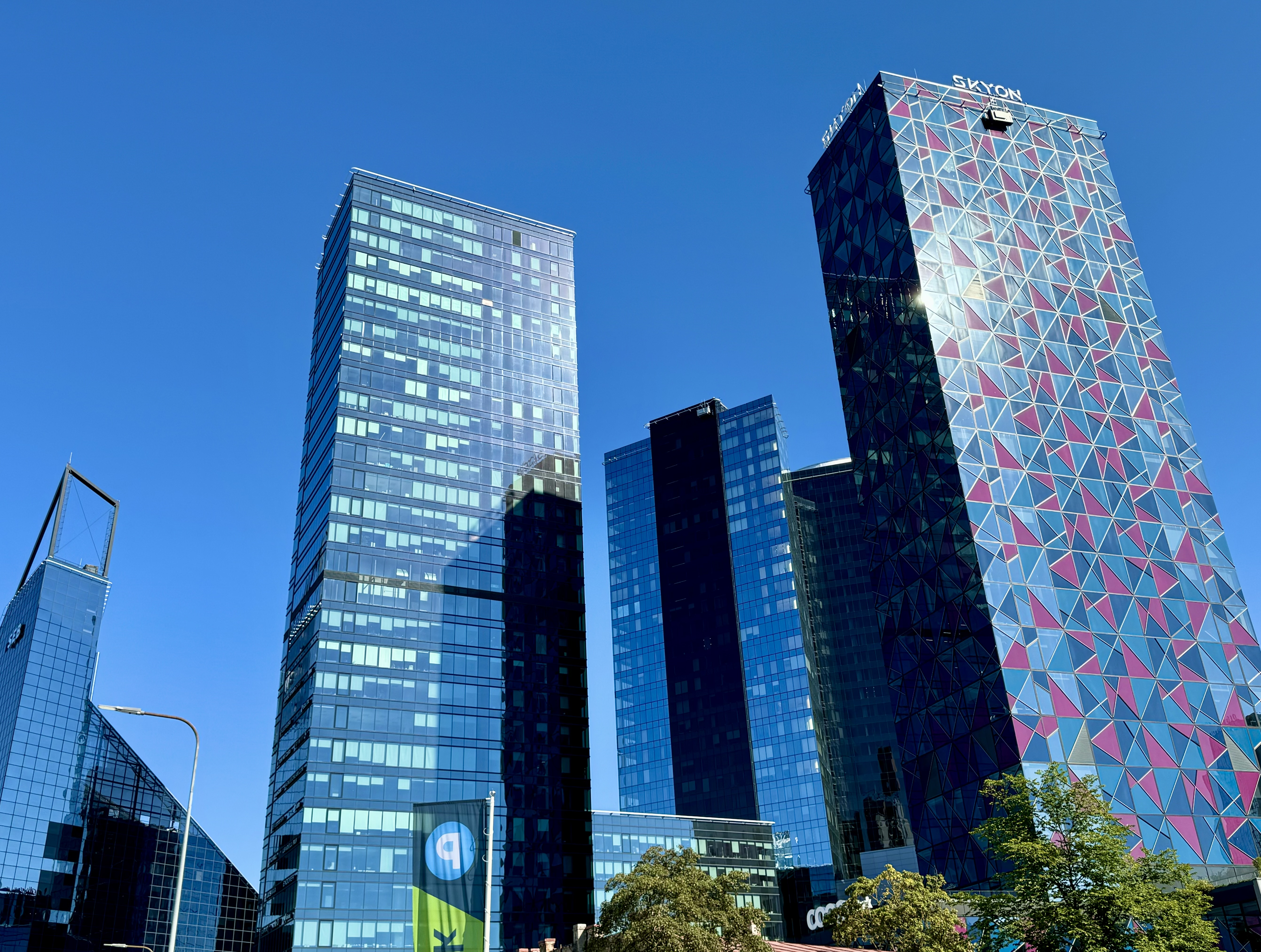
