= Coop Pank =

Company based in Estonia

- Company type: Publicly traded
- Traded as: Nasdaq Tallinn
- Industry: Financial services
- Predecessor: Estonian Credit Bank (established in 1992)
- Founded: 1992; 34 years ago
- Headquarters: Tallinn, Estonia
- Key people: Margus Rink (CEO), Alo Ivask (Chairman)
- Products: Retail banking, merchant banking, life insurance, pensions
- Revenue: EUR 39,238 million ▲(+26,2%) (2021)
- Net income: EUR 13,46 million ▲(+85,4%) (2021)
- Owner: Coop Investeeringud OÜ (24,79%)
- Number of employees: 314 (30. September 2022)
- Subsidiaries: Coop Liising AS Coop Finants AS; Coop Kindlustusmaakler AS SIA Prana Property
- Website: Official website

Coop Pank (earlier Eesti Krediidipank) is an Estonian bank, headquartered in Tallinn. The bank operates only in Estonia. The official name of the bank is Coop Pank AS. Coop Pank offers deposits, business and personal loans, leasing, bank cards, settlement services, card payment acceptance, factoring, private banking and insurance services. Bank has internet bank and mobile bank. The Bank has joined with the flash payment system RT1 that is developed in Estonia by Eesti Pank, which gives customers the opportunity to make flash payments.

The bank was established in 1992 under the name Eesti Krediidipank ('Estonian Credit Bank') In 2017 Coop Eesti bought Eesti Krediidipank and the bank was renamed Coop Pank.

Coop Pank has been designated as a Significant Institution since the entry into force of European Banking Supervision in late 2014, and as a consequence is directly supervised by the European Central Bank.

In February 2023 the bank had 15 offices and 12 bank points (Estonian: pangapunkt). The bank has no offices or bank points outside Estonia. The bank's customers can withdraw money and deposit it in nearly 330 stores across Estonia. The latter distinguishes the bank from other banks operating in Estonia.

In February 2023 the bank had 147,000 everyday banking customers. The bank has a market share of 5.5% in both the deposits and loans market in Estonia.

The bank is listed on Nasdaq Tallinn. On 22 February 2023 Coop Pank was, based on market value, the sixth largest company in Nasdaq Tallinn stock market.

== See also ==
- List of banks in the euro area
- List of banks in Estonia
