= Sokos Hotel Viru =

Hotel in Tallinn, Estonia

Coordinates: 59°26′12″N 24°45′18″E

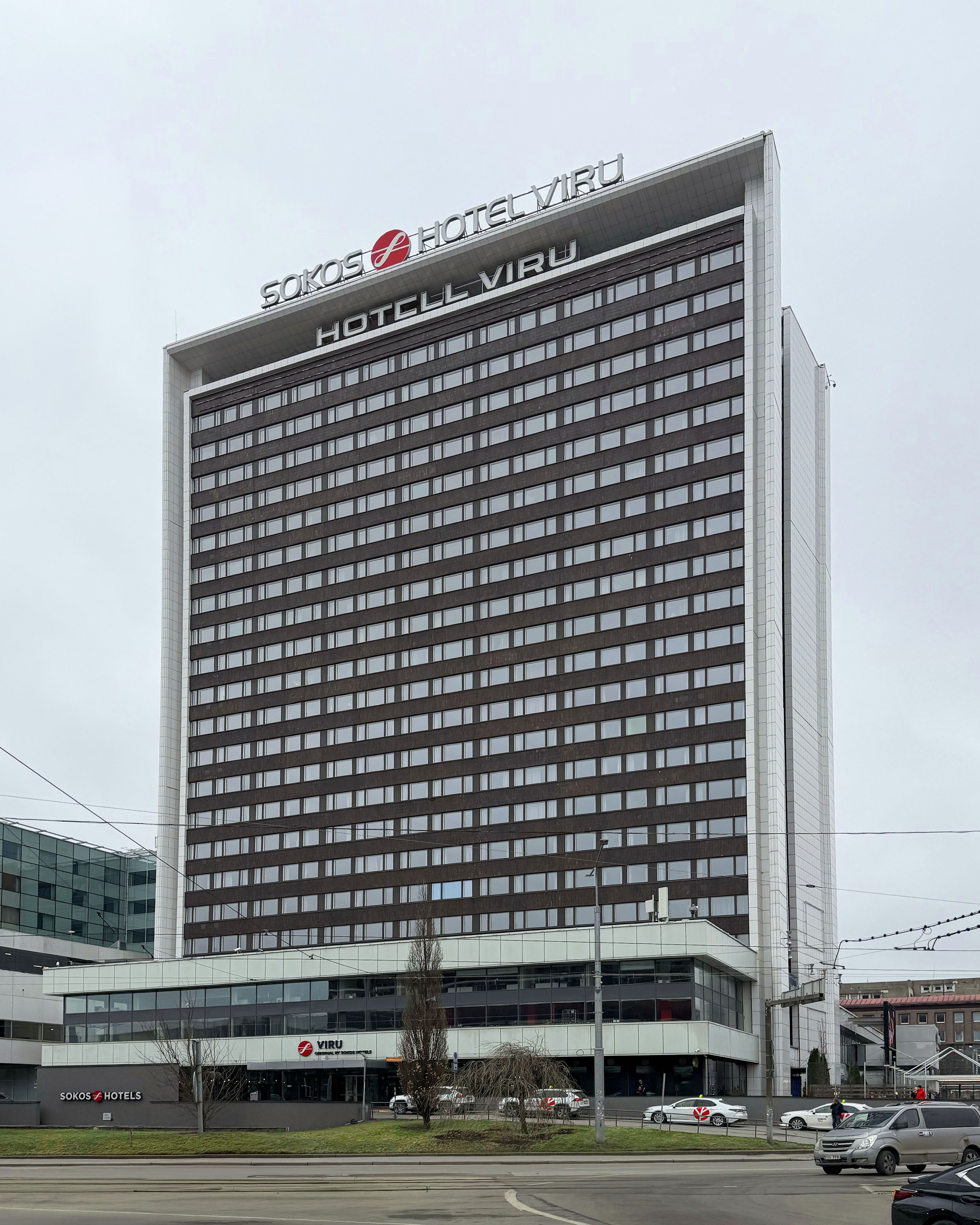
Sokos Hotel Viru in March 2026

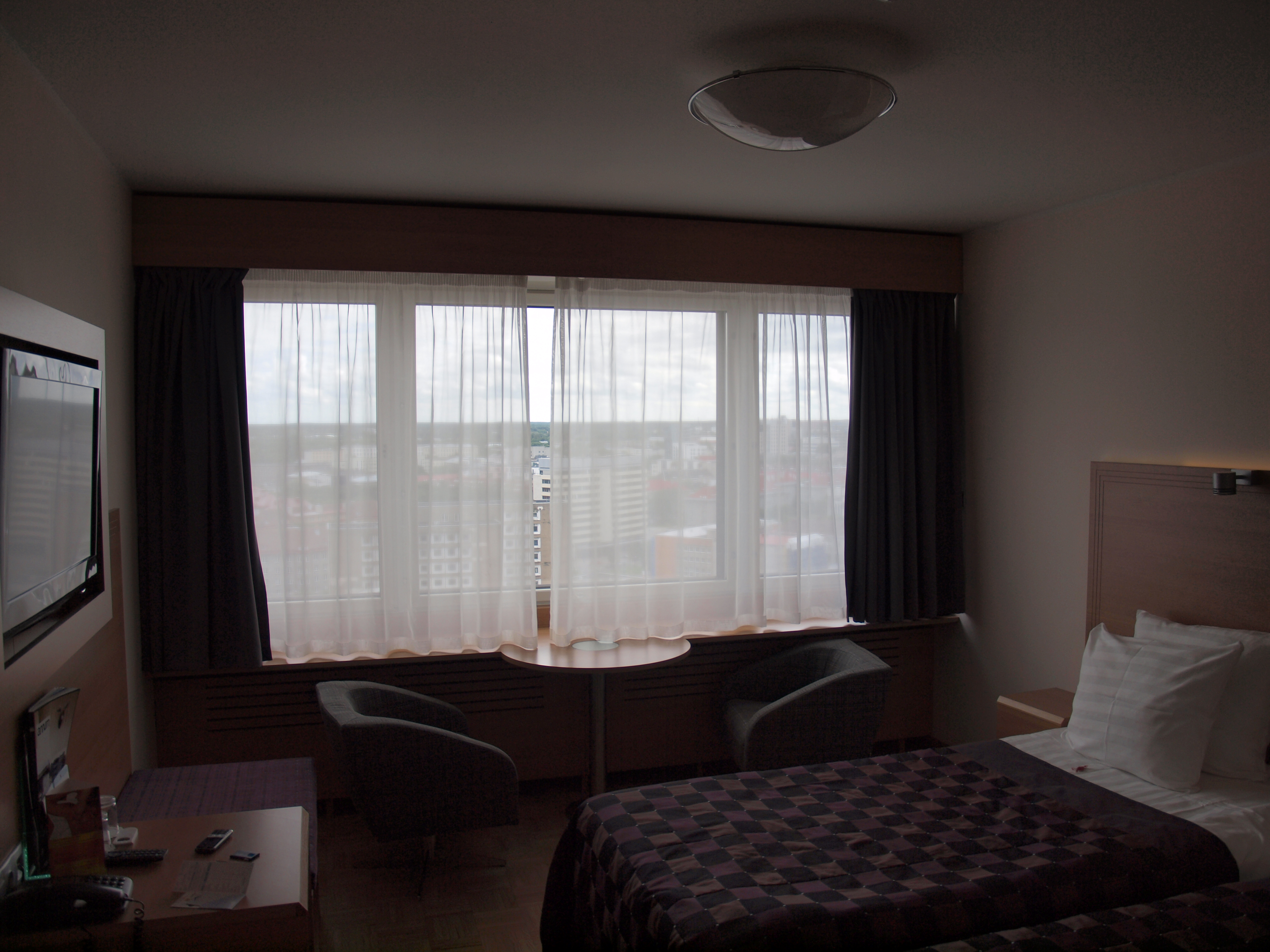
A standard double room at the hotel, in summer 2012

The Original Sokos Hotel Viru is a hotel in Tallinn, Estonia. It was Estonia's first high-rise building and is connected to the Viru Keskus shopping center. It is owned by Sokos Hotels.

== History ==
The Hotel Viru was built by Intourist, the government tourist monopoly of the Soviet Union. It was constructed by the Repo Oy construction company, based in Savonlinna, Finland. Work began in July 1969. However, a fire broke out on the 10th floor of the project in December 1969, and the Finnish company went bankrupt as a result. Another Finnish company, Haka Oy, completed the hotel in May 1972 and the Hotel Viru opened on June 14, 1972.

During the Soviet occupation, the 23rd floor of the hotel contained a KGB listening center, used to spy on hotel guests. Sixty of the hotel's rooms had concealed espionage devices and some restaurant tables had listening devices. The KGB left the hotel just before Estonia regained its independence in August 1991, but the secret rooms weren't found until 1994. This former radio center is now a museum.

In 2003, the hotel was sold to the S Group, a Finnish retailing cooperative organization. It now has 516 rooms.
