= Merko Ehitus =

Estonian construction company

Merko Ehitus is an Estonian construction company (joint-stock company) which is focusing on prime contracting and project management. The company is active in Baltic countries being one of the leading construction companies in these countries.

Merko Ehitus includes also Merko Ehitus Eesti and its subsidiaries Tallinna Teede AS and Merko Infra AS.

Since 1997, the company is listed in Nasdaq Tallinn.

The company is employed about 800 people in Baltic states and Norway.

In 2018, the revenue of the company was 418 million euros.

In 2021, Merko Ehitus was the 9th largest company on the Nasdaq Baltic Exchange in terms of trading activity. As of May 25, 2022, Merko Ehitus' market share (market value) is 279 million euros, making it the 11th largest company on the Nasdaq Baltic Stock Exchange. In 2021, the company's market value increased by 61%.
