= Radisson Blu Hotel Olümpia =

Hotel in Tallinn, Estonia

Coordinates: 59.430301507226524°N 24.757796175102868°E

Hotel Olümpia
- Hotel Olümpia in 2022
- Hotel chain: Radisson Blu

General information
- Location: Tallinn, Estonia
- Completed: 1980
- Opened: 6 April 1980
- Height: 84 m (276 ft)

Technical details
- Floor count: 26

Design and construction
- Architect(s): Ain Andressoo, Toivo Kallas, Rein Kersten

Radisson Blu Hotel Olümpia is hotel in Kesklinn, Tallinn at Liivalaia Street 33. The hotel was built in 1980 for the 1980 Summer Olympic Games. It has a height of 84 m.

The hotel was designed by architects Ain Andressoo, Toivo Kallas and Rein Kersten.

The hotel has 26 floors and 390 visitor rooms.
