= List of tallest structures in Estonia =

A list of the tallest structures (over 50 m (160 ft)) in Estonia. This list contains all types of structures.

Name	Pinnacle height	Image	Location	Year built	Structural type	Coordinates	Remarks
Koeru TV Mast	349.5 m (1,147 ft)		Kapu, Järva Parish	1993	Guyed mast	58°58′27.1″N 26°3′24.68″E	
Valgjärve TV Mast	347 m (1,138 ft)		Pikareinu, Kanepi Parish	1988	Guyed mast	58°5′49.93″N 26°40′41.81″E	187 m above sea level. Highest top of Estonia.
Tallinn TV Tower	314 m (1,030 ft)		Tallinn	1980	Tower (concrete)	59°28′16.4″N 24°53′15.17″E	
Kohtla TV Mast	254 m (833 ft)		Kohtla-Nõmme, Toila Parish	1984	Guyed mast	59°20′53.33″N 27°11′48.75″E	247 m
2 Chimneys of Eesti Power Plant	250 m (820 ft)		Narva	1973	Chimney	59°16′20″N 27°54′8″E	
Kavastu Radio Mast	250 m (820 ft)		Pajukurmu, Luunja Parish	2000		58°25′4″N 27°6′0″E	
Chimney of Iru Thermal Power Plant	202.4 m (664 ft)		Maardu	1978	Chimney	59°27′7.24″N 24°55′33.38″E	220 m
Türi Radio Mast	197 m (646 ft)		Türi, Türi Parish	1937	lattice tower		1937 was the tallest structure in Northern Europe. Blown up in 1941
Pärnu TV Mast	196 m (643 ft)		Pärnu, Pärnu municipality	1963	lattice tower	58°22′39″N 24°34′32″E	When built in 1963, it was the tallest structure in Estonia.
Tallinn TV Mast	192 m (630 ft)		Tallinn	1955	lattice tower		Dismantled in 1984
Tartu TV Mast	192 m (630 ft)		Tartu, Tartu municipality	1957	lattice tower	58°21′43.53″N 26°42′7.75″E	
2 Chimneys of Balti Power Plant	180 m (590 ft)		Narva	1965	Chimney	59°21′11″N 28°7′16″E	
Orissaare TV Mast	180 m (590 ft)		Orissaare, Saaremaa Parish	1965	lattice tower	58°33′31″N 23°03′59″E	3803 KM?
Chimney of Mustamäe Boiler House	125 m (410 ft)		Tallinn	1963	Chimney		
Saue Mast	124.8 m (409 ft)		Saue, Saue Parish	2001			
St. Olaf's Church	123.7 m (406 ft)		Tallinn	1549		59°26′29.23″N 24°44′51.3″E	1549–1625 it was the tallest building in the world with the height of 159 m (522 ft).
Männamaa transmitter	120 m (390 ft)		Männamaa, Hiiumaa Parish	2008		58°49′48″N 22°37′15″E	
Sauvere transmitter	120 m (390 ft)		Sauvere, Saaremaa Parish	2008		58°22′43″N 22°19′50″E	
Haapsalu transmitter	117 m (384 ft)		Uuemõisa, Haapsalu			58°56′44″N 23°35′16″E	
Swissôtel Tallinn	117 m (384 ft)		Tallinn	2007		59°25′58.57″N 24°45′41.59″E	
Tornimäe Apartments	117 m (384 ft)		Tallinn	2006			
Ellamaa transmitter	>116 m (381 ft)		Ellamaa, Saue Parish	2008		59°01′55″N 24°09′48″E	
Pehka transmitter	>116 m (381 ft)		Pehka, Haljala Parish	2008		59°29′24″N 26°20′54″E	
Maakri 19/21	110 m (361 ft)		Tallinn	2018		59°26′0″N 24°45′34″E	
Aegviidu TV Mast	107 m (351 ft)		Aegviidu, Anija Parish			59°17′27″N 25°36′19″E	
St. Nicholas' Church	105 m (344 ft)		Tallinn	1420		59°26′9.57″N 24°44′32.76″E	Renovated 1984
Radisson Blu Hotel Tallinn	104.8 m (344 ft)		Tallinn	2001		59°26′0.52″N 24°45′28.54″E	
Kärdla transmitter	103 m (338 ft)		Kärdla, Hiiumaa Parish	1980		58°59′50″N 22°45′56″E	
Torila mobiilimast	100 m (330 ft)		Torila, Peipsiääre Parish	2000	Cell phone tower	58°39′53″N 27°06′55″E	
Kristiina transmitter	>97 m (318 ft)		Tallinn			59°25′32″N 24°44′20″E	
Kihnu transmitter	>97 m (318 ft)		Linaküla, Kihnu Parish			58°07′12″N 23°58′23″E	
Headquarters of SEB Pank	94.5 m (310 ft)		Tallinn	1999		59°26′2.4″N 24°45′38.69″E	
Chimney of Kehra cellulose factory	90 m (300 ft)		Kehra, Anija Parish	1938		59°20′28″N 25°20′15″E	Blown up by Soviet forces in 1941
Tigutorn	89.92 m (295.0 ft)		Tartu, Tartu municipality	2008		58°22′35.73″N 26°44′9.38″E	
Sõrve transmitter	>89 m (292 ft)		Sõrve, Harku Parish	1985		58°02′59″N 22°07′44″E	
Chimney of Tallinn Power Plant	85 m (279 ft)		Tallinn	1948		59°26′40″N 24°45′3″E	old chimney was 102 m
Chimney of Ülemiste boiler house	85 m (279 ft)		Tallinn	?		59°25′30″N 24°46′38″E	
Radisson Blu Hotel Olympia	84 m (276 ft)		Tallinn	1980		59°25′49.15″N 24°45′28.26″E	
Ruhnu transmitter	>80 m (260 ft)		Ruhnu, Ruhnu Parish			57°48′14″N 23°15′30″E	
Koljaku transmitter	>80 m (260 ft)		Koljaku, Haljala Parish	2010		59°33′42″N 25°59′27″E	
Ruusmäe transmitter	>80 m (260 ft)		Ruusmäe, Rõuge Parish			57°37′47″N 27°05′37″E	
Lauli transmitter	>80 m (260 ft)		Lauli, Haljala Parish			59°32′48″N 26°07′46″E	
Chimney of Sillamäe power station	80 m (260 ft)		Sillamäe	1961	Chimney	59°24′3″N 27°43′21″E	
Many cell phone towers	80 m (260 ft)			since 1997			
City Plaza	78 m (256 ft)		Tallinn	2004		59°26′4.96″N 24°45′30.7″E	
Järvakandi transmitter	>78 m (256 ft)		Järvakandi, Kehtna Parish			58°47′01″N 24°49′00″E	
Viljandi transmitter	>75 m (246 ft)		Viljandi	1980		58°20′59″N 25°36′25″E	
Paldiski transmitter	>75 m (246 ft)		Paldiski, Lääne-Harju Parish			59°21′40″N 24°06′33″E	
Sokos Hotel Viru	74 m (243 ft)		Tallinn	1972		59°26′11.71″N 24°45′18.07″E	
Maakri Maja	71.5 m (235 ft)		Tallinn	2003		59°25′55.39″N 24°45′34.25″E	
Kallaste transmitter	>70 m (230 ft)		Kallaste, Peipsiääre Parish	2010		58°39′53″N 27°06′55″E	
St. Mary's Cathedral	68 m (223 ft)		Tallinn	1779		59°26′13.5″N 24°44′19.98″E	
Ähijärve transmitter	>68 m (223 ft)		Ähijärve, Antsla Parish			57°43′50″N 26°28′45″E	
Vastseliina transmitter	>68 m (223 ft)		Vastseliina, Võru Parish			57°43′17″N 27°16′51″E	
Tartu Cathedral	66 m (217 ft)		Tartu, Tartu municipality	1470		58°22′48.7″N 26°42′54″E	Towers dismantled in 1760s
Tallinn Town Hall	64 m (210 ft)		Tallinn	1404		59°26′13.34″N 24°44′44.66″E	
Narva transmitter	>63 m (207 ft)		Narva			59°22′52″N 28°11′30″E	
St. John's Church	63 m (207 ft)		Tartu, Tartu municipality	1323		58°22′57.54″N 26°43′11.56″E	
Eisma transmitter	>60 m (200 ft)		Eisma, Haljala Parish			59°33′36″N 26°17′32″E	
Abja-Paluoja transmitter	>60 m (200 ft)		Abja-Paluoja, Mulgi Parish			58°07′49″N 25°23′08″E	
Tartu Radio Mast	60 m (200 ft)		Tartu, Tartu municipality	1927			Blown up in 1941
Muuga Grain Terminal	60 m (200 ft)		Muuga, Viimsi Parish			59°29′28.54″N 24°57′11.26″E	
Charles' Church	59.2 m (194 ft)		Tallinn	1882		59°25′54.97″N 24°44′19.92″E	
St. Peter's Church	56 m (184 ft)		Tartu, Tartu municipality	1890		58°23′24.62″N 26°43′42.61″E	
Osten Tor	55.6 m (182 ft)		Tallinn	2006		59°24′51.01″N 24°44′19.55″E	
Al Mare I			Tallinn	2009		59°25′37.56″N 24°39′21.8″E	
Fahle Maja	55 m (180 ft)		Tallinn	2006		59°25′30.54″N 24°46′52.27″E	
Pirita tee 26F	55 m (180 ft)		Tallinn	2003		59°26′50.85″N 24°48′32.19″E	
Baltika brick factory chimney	55 m (180 ft)		Tallinn	?	Chimney		demolished in 1937
Haanja transmitter	>55 m (180 ft)		Haanja, Rõuge Parish			57°43′22″N 27°03′16″E	
Alexander Nevsky Cathedral			Tallinn	1900		59°26′8.83″N 24°44′21.93″E	
St. John's Church			Tallinn	1867		59°26′1.74″N 24°44′42.34″E	
St. Mary's Church			Tartu, Tartu municipality	1842		58°22′35.17″N 26°43′0.06″E	Bombed in 1941
Nordea Maja	54.2 m (178 ft)		Tallinn	2009		59°25′53.03″N 24°45′37.4″E	
Church of the Holy Ghost	53 m (174 ft)		Tallinn	1363		59°26′17.11″N 24°44′44.43″E	
Pakri Lighthouse	52.3 m (172 ft)		Paldiski, Lääne-Harju Parish	1889	Lighthouse	59°23′15″N 24°02′16″E	
Emajõe Business Centre	52 m (171 ft)		Tartu, Tartu municipality	1998		58°22′43.26″N 26°43′52.19″E	
Ministry of Finance	52 m (171 ft)?		Tallinn	1978			
Postimehe Maja	52 m (171 ft)		Tallinn	2000		59°25′57.21″N 24°45′37.94″E	
Sõrve Lighthouse	52 m (171 ft)		Sääre, Saaremaa Parish	1960	Lighthouse	57°54′35″N 22°3′19″E	
Hermann Castle	51 m (167 ft)		Narva	1347		59°22′32.4″N 28°12′4.77″E	
Kentmanni II			Tallinn	2009			
Delta Plaza			Tallinn	2008		59°24′9.38″N 24°43′49.66″E	
Toompea Castle	50.2 m (165 ft)		Tallinn	1371		59°26′6.66″N 24°44′13.28″E	
EPA Torn	50 m (160 ft)		Tartu, Tartu municipality	1976		58°23′15.3″N 26°41′43.09″E	
Sõpruse pst 222	50 m (160 ft)		Tallinn	1991			
Kalevipoja 10	50 m (160 ft)		Tallinn	1989			
Koorti 18	50 m (160 ft)		Tallinn	1992			
Pinna 19	50 m (160 ft)		Tallinn	1991			
A. Puškini 20			Narva			59°22′36.22″N 28°11′38.2″E	
Toompea Castle	45 m (148 ft)		Tallinn	1371		59°26′6.66″N 24°44′13.28″E	

== See also ==
- List of tallest buildings in Estonia
- List of tallest structures in the former Soviet Union
- List of tallest chimneys in the world
