= Stadium of Tartu University =

Multi-purpose stadium in Tartu, Estonia

- Tartu Ülikooli staadion
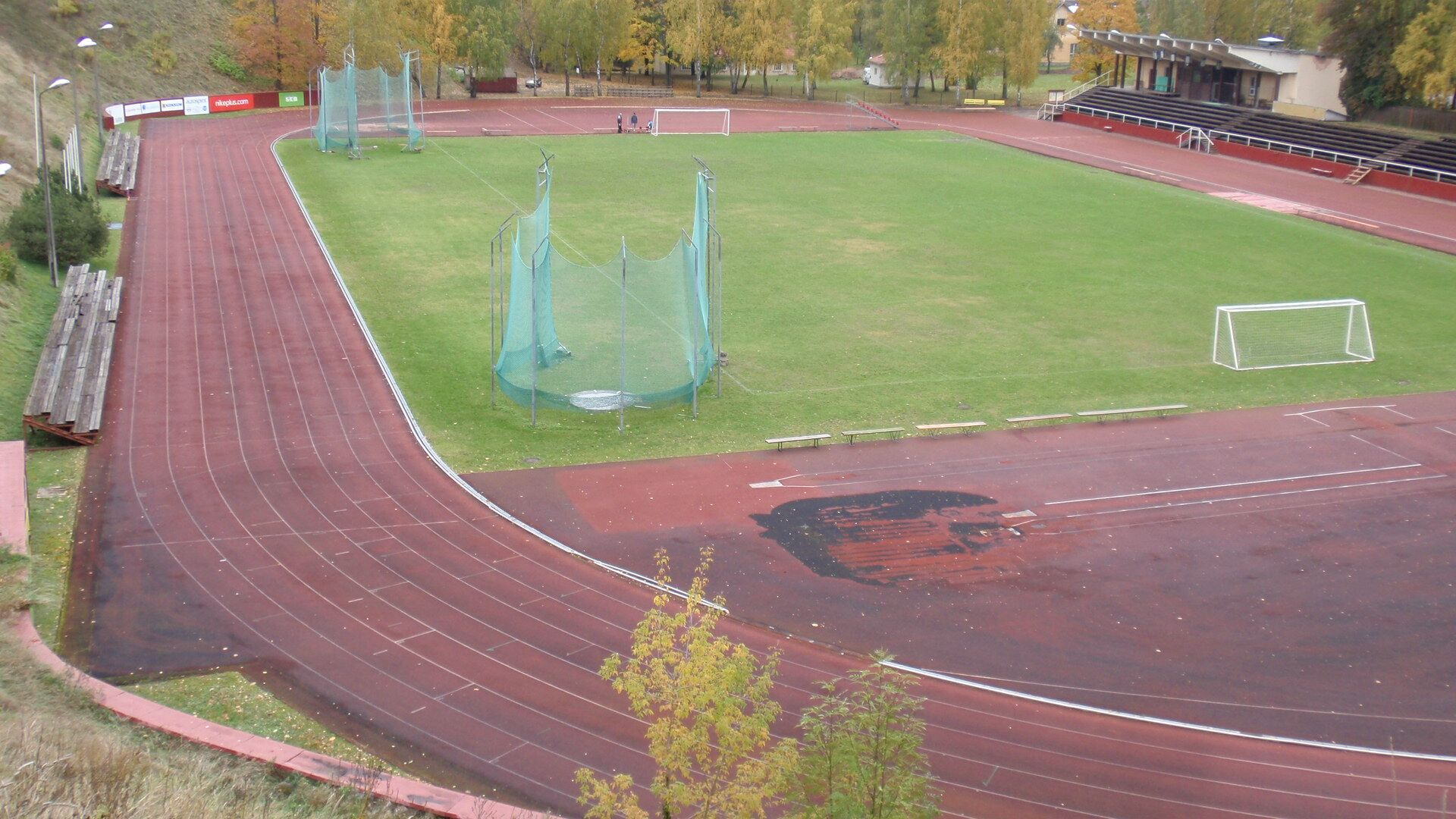
- Location: Tartu, Estonia
- Coordinates: 58°23′23.7″N 26°43′30.2″E
- Owner: University of Tartu
- Capacity: 1,700

Construction
- Opened: 1920s – as a sports field 1957 – as the stadium
- Renovated: 1999
- Architect: Arnold Matteus

Stadium of Tartu University (Estonian: Tartu Ülikooli staadion) is a multi-purpose stadium in Tartu, Estonia. It is owned and operated by the University of Tartu and has a capacity of 1,700.

== History ==
=== Early history ===
The history of the stadium dates back to the 1920s, when a small sports field was opened at the site of the current stadium. Despite its modest size, the field hosted one the greatest long-distance runners of all time Paavo Nurmi in 1928, and the Estonian decathlon championship in 1938.

After the completion of a more modern and larger Tamme Stadium in 1932, Tartu's sports life, along with the University of Tartu sports club, moved to Tammelinn. However, as time passed, Tamme Stadium was not able to satisfy the needs of the university's sports faculty and in 1953, Tartu gave the old sports field back to the university.

=== The 'Rise and demise' of the Stadium of Tartu University ===
In 1954, the construction of a new and modern stadium began. The project was designed by Arnold Matteus and the construction of the entire complex cost 3 million rubles. The opening took place in the autumn of 1957.

Throughout the second part of 20th century, the Stadium of Tartu University hosted numerous top level athletics competitions and was again at the heart of Tartu's sports life, hosting the javelin throw world record holder Jan Železný and Aki Parviainen among others.

On 6 August 1997, the stadium hosted Estonia's football match against Faroe Islands. Despite it being the first time in history the national football team had played in Tartu, the athletics community voiced their resentment, stating that the stadium should remain to only be athletics based.

The stadium was last renovated in 1999. After the reconstruction of Tamme Stadium in 2011, the sports life once again moved away from the University Stadium. Today, the sports complex is in a poor condition and is only used for track and field trainings.

== Estonia national team matches ==
The Stadium of Tartu University has hosted the Estonia national football team once, in 1997.

Date		Result	Competition	Attendance
6 August 1997	Estonia – Faroe Islands	0–2	Friendly	1,000

== Gallery ==
Stadium of Tartu University in 2009

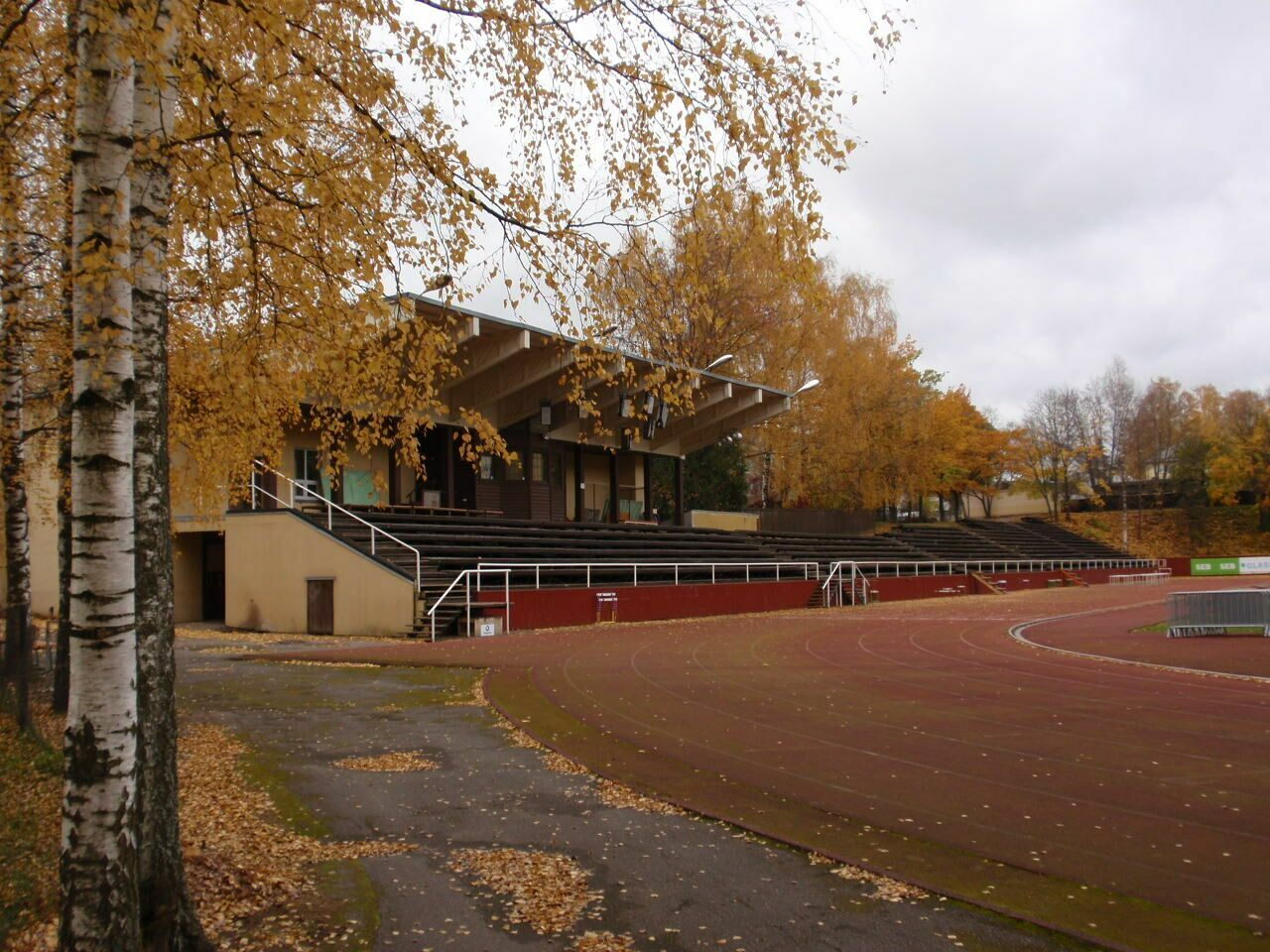

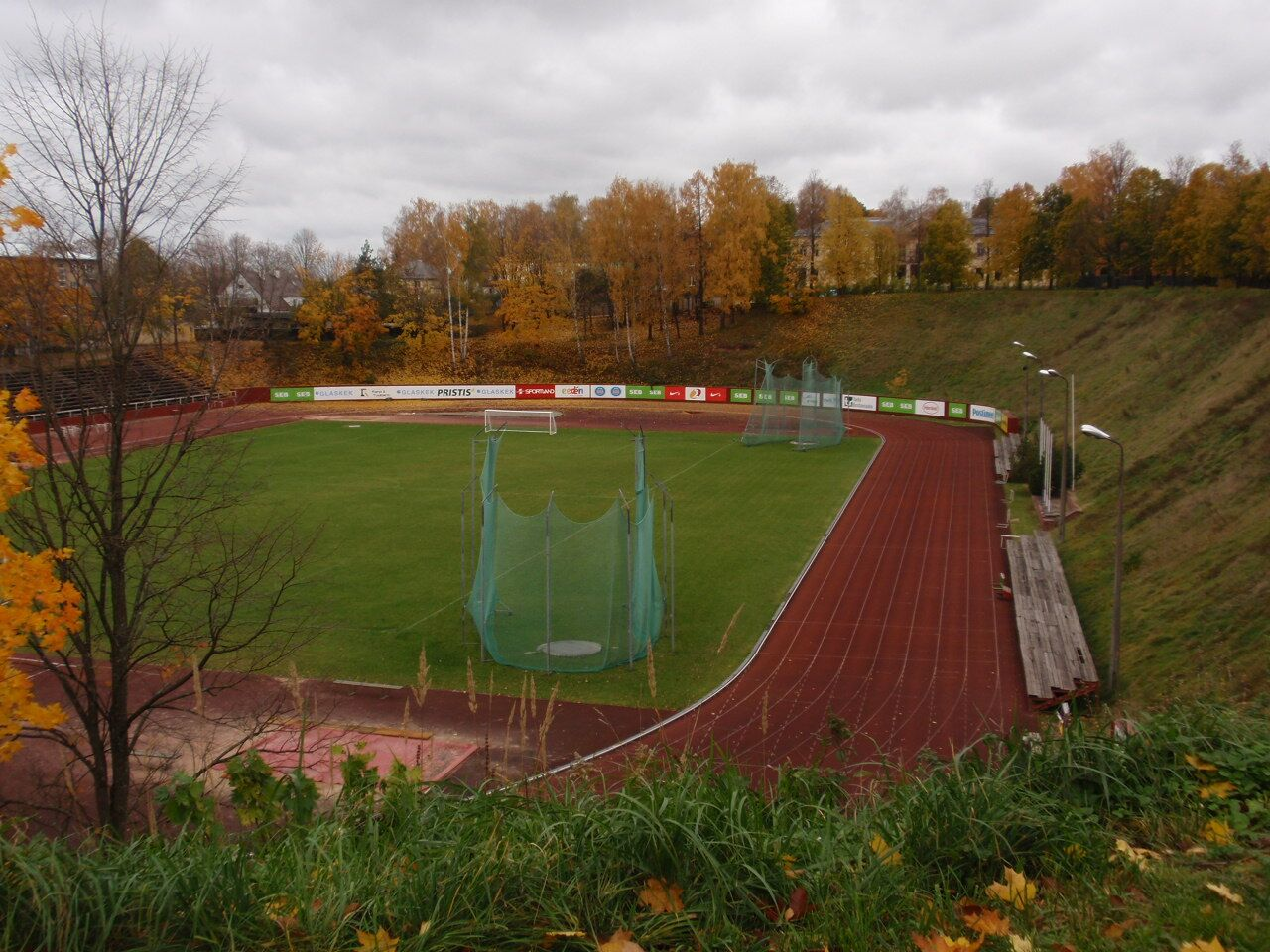

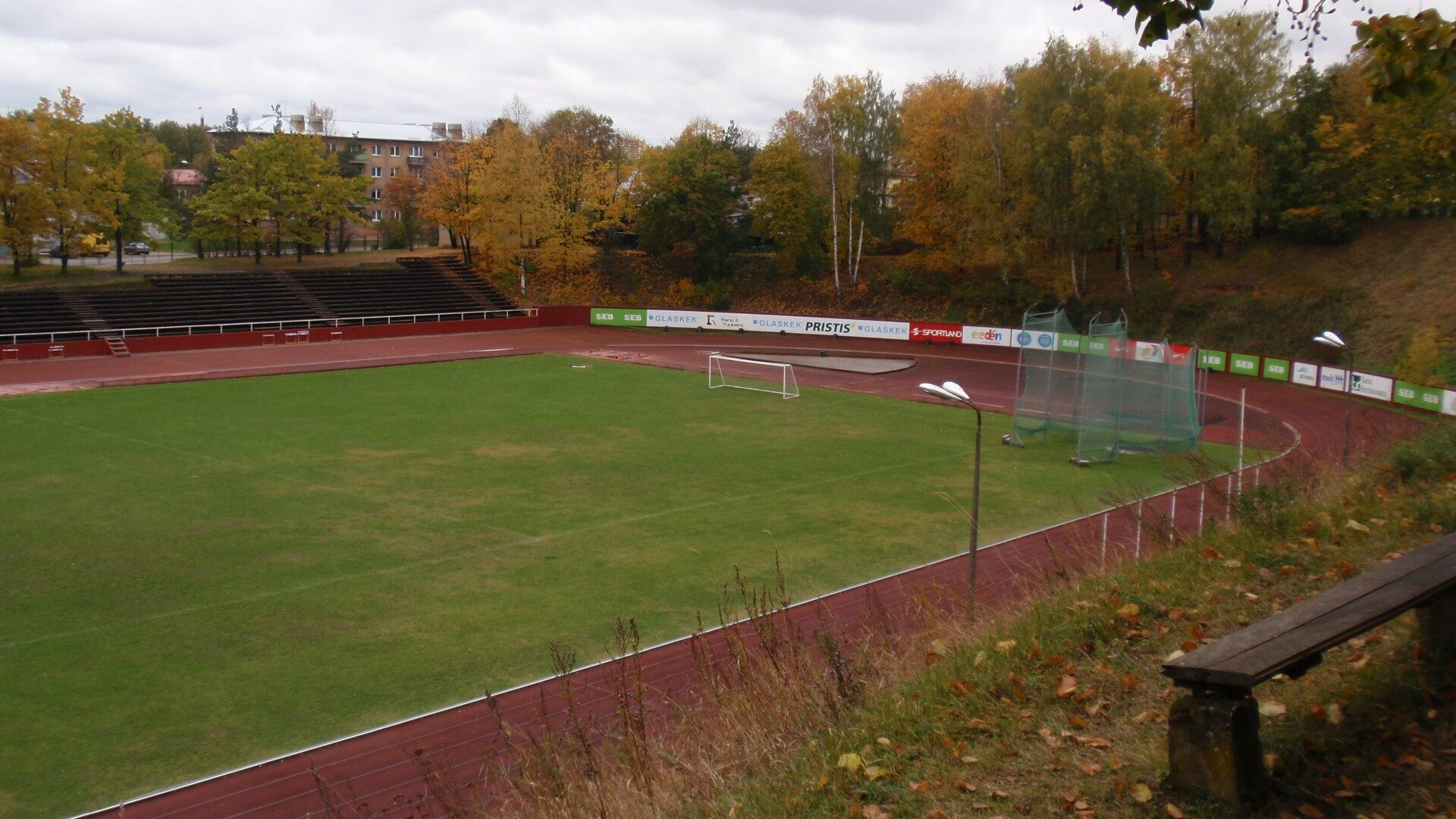

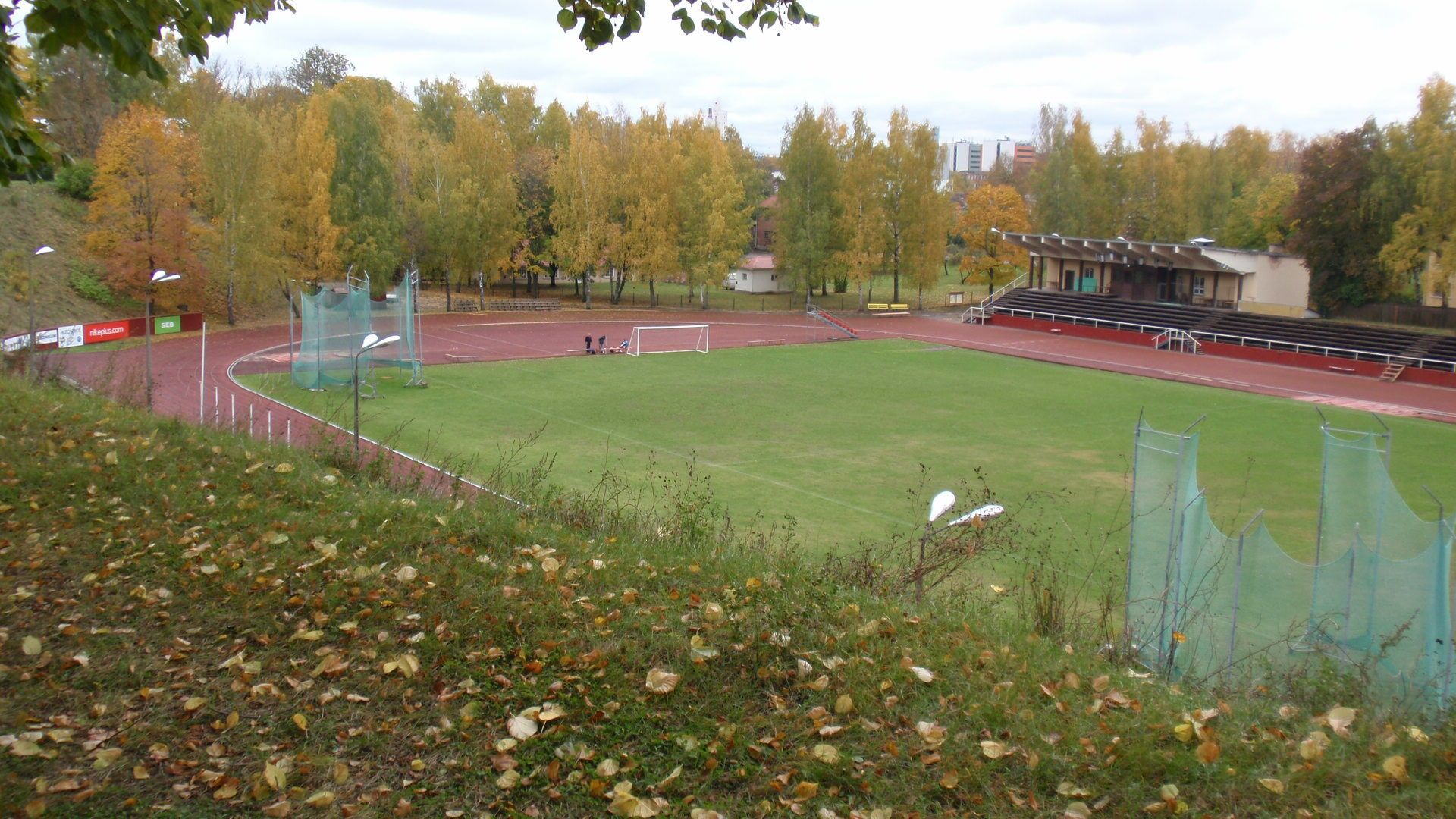

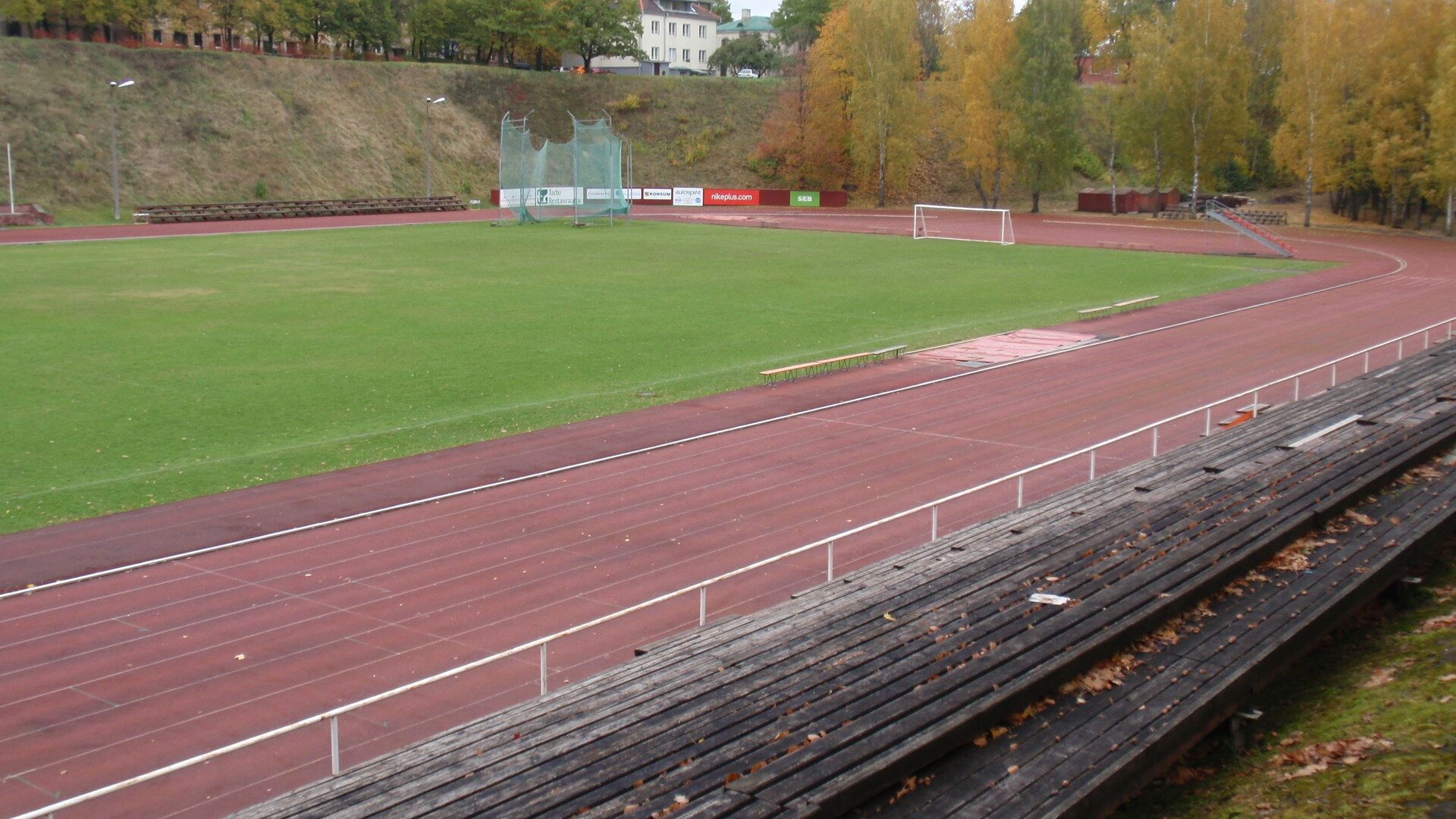
