= Sääre, Saare County =

Village in Estonia

Sääre
- Village
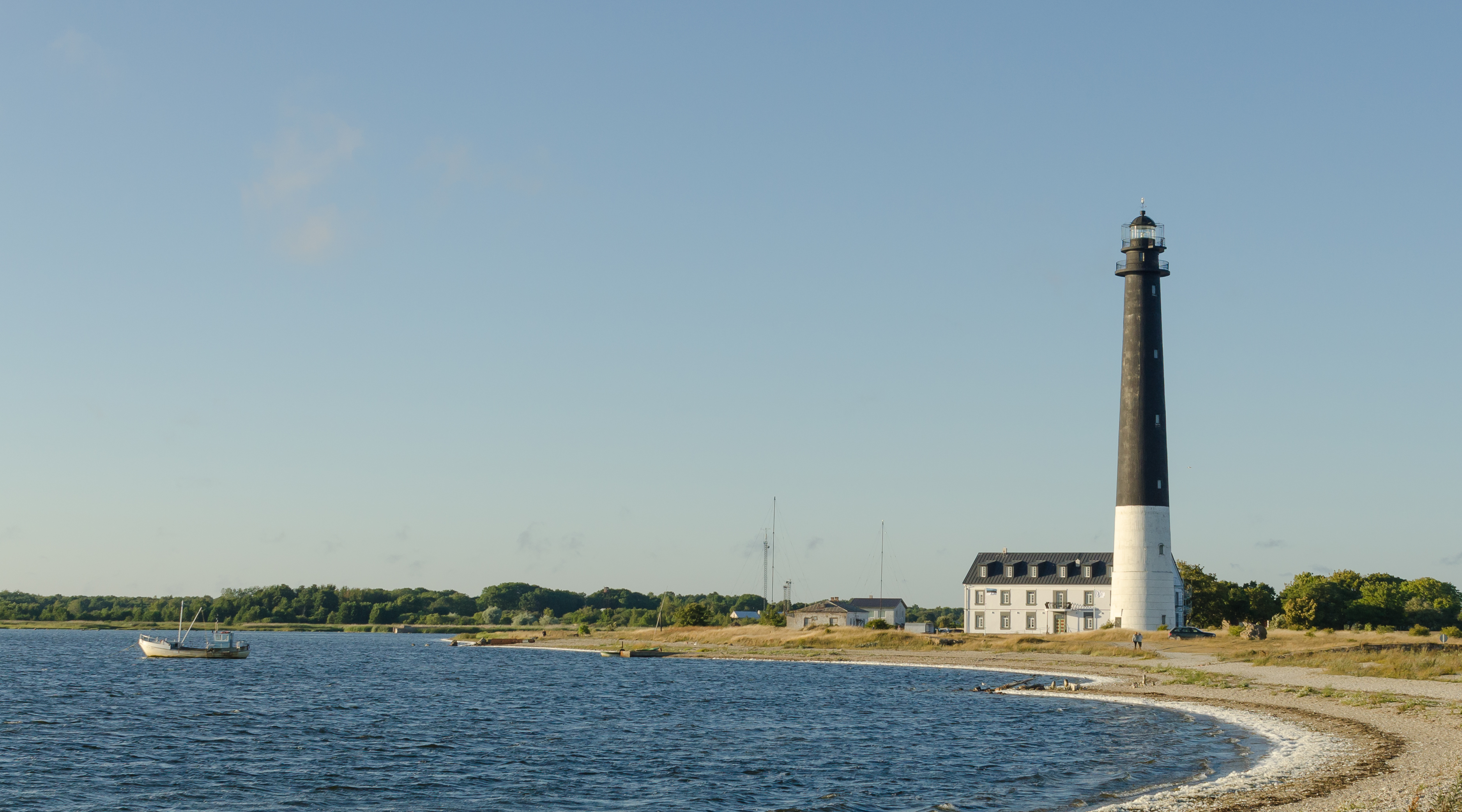
- Sõrve Lighthouse

- Location in Estonia
- Coordinates: 57°55′06″N 22°03′35″E
- Country: Estonia
- County: Saare County
- Municipality: Saaremaa Parish

Population (2011 Census)
  - Total: 0

Sääre is a village in Saaremaa Parish, Saare County, Estonia, on the island of Saaremaa. It is located on the southern top of the Sõrve Peninsula. As of the 2011 census, the settlement is uninhabited.

Sääre village is the location of Sõrve Lighthouse and former Red Army's Coastal Battery no. 315 (known as Stebel Battery) during World War II.
