= Türi Radio Mast =

Transmitter mast in Estonia

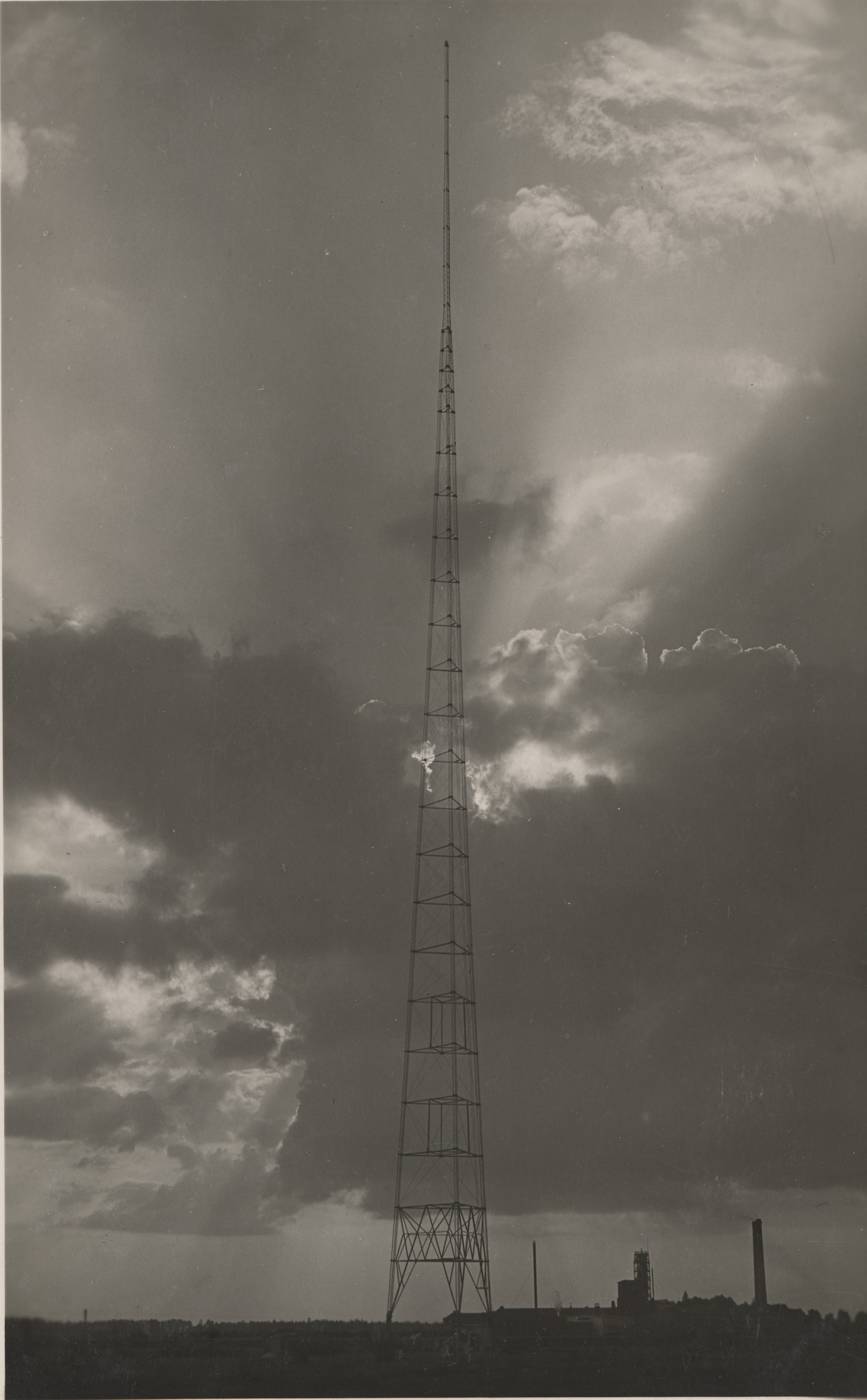
- Türi Radio Mast
- Mast height: 196.6 m (645 ft)
- Coordinates: 58°48′13″N 25°26′45″E
- Built: 1937; 89 years ago
- Demolished: 1941; 85 years ago

Türi Radio Mast (Estonian: Türi raadiomast) was a radio mast in Türi, Estonia.

The mast's height was 196.6 m. It was built between 1936 and 1937 by the US company Electric Transmission Ltd.

The mast was destroyed in 1941 by Soviet troops to impede the movement of German troops.

== See also ==
- List of tallest structures in Estonia
- Lattice tower
