= Tartu TV Mast =

Television tower in Tartu, Estonia

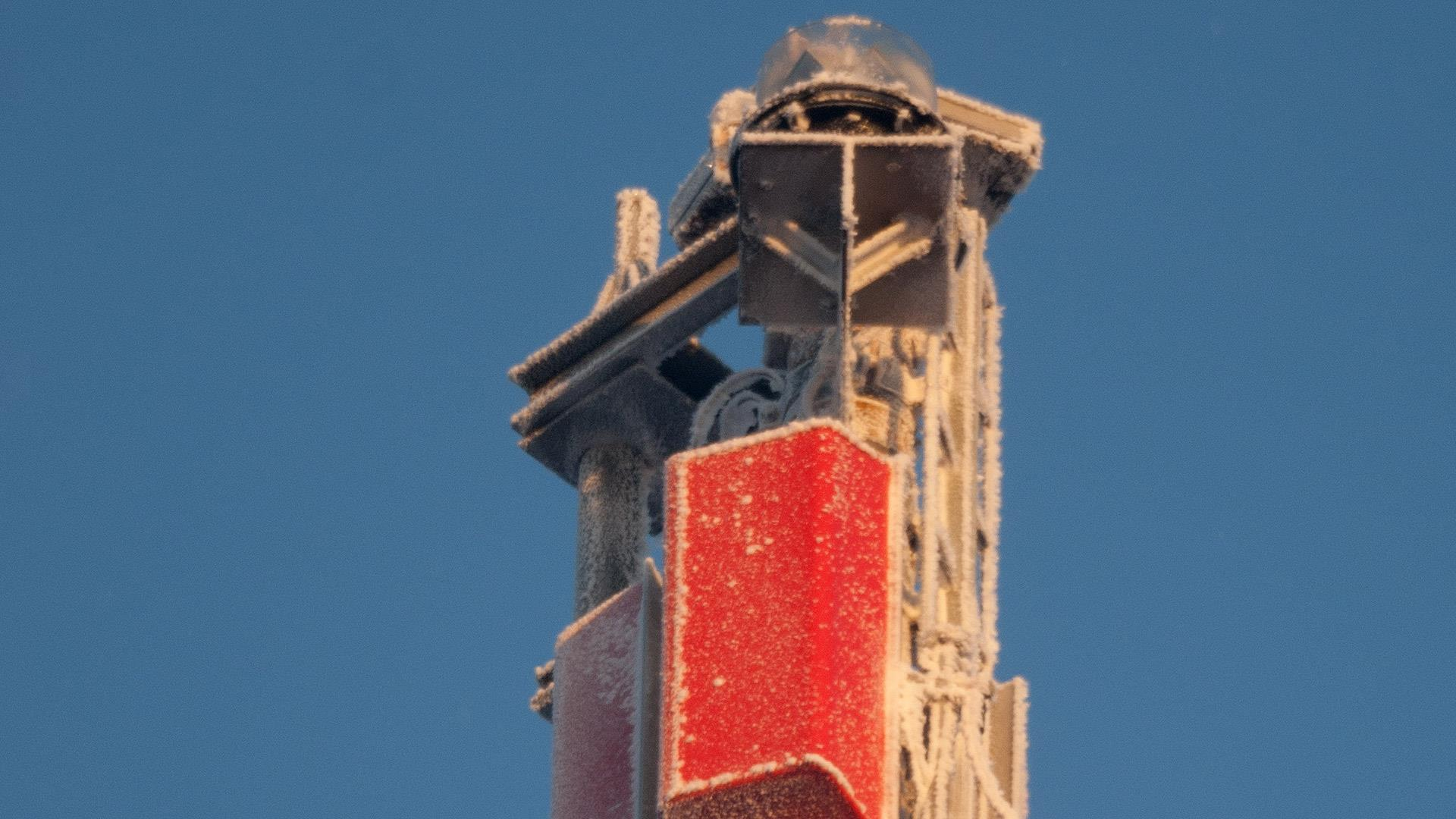
- Tartu TV Mast in 2013
- Interactive map of the Tartu TV Mast area

General information
- Type: telecommunications
- Location: Tammelinn, Tartu, Estonia
- Coordinates: 58°21′43.53″N 26°42′07.75″E
- Completed: 1957

Height
- Antenna spire: 192 metres (630 ft)

Technical details
- Floor count: 2

The Tartu TV Mast (Estonian: Soinaste telemast) is a truss tower located in Tammelinn, Tartu, Estonia. The tower stands 185.9 metres (610 ft) tall and was originally constructed in 1957. In 2011 the antenna was rebuilt. It is one of the tallest structures in Estonia.
