= Pajukurmu =

Village in Estonia

Coordinates: 58°23′N 27°03′E

- Village
- Interactive map of Pajukurmu
- Country: Estonia
- County: Tartu County
- Parish: Luunja Parish
- Time zone: UTC+2 (EET)
  - Summer (DST): UTC+3 (EEST)

Pajukurmu (formerly, Pajupuustuse) is a village in Luunja Parish, Tartu County in eastern Estonia.

The tallest radio mast in Estonia, Kavastu Radio Mast, is located in Pajukurmu. The 250 m (820 ft) structure was built in 2000.
