= 3803 KM =

Broadcasting tower in Russia

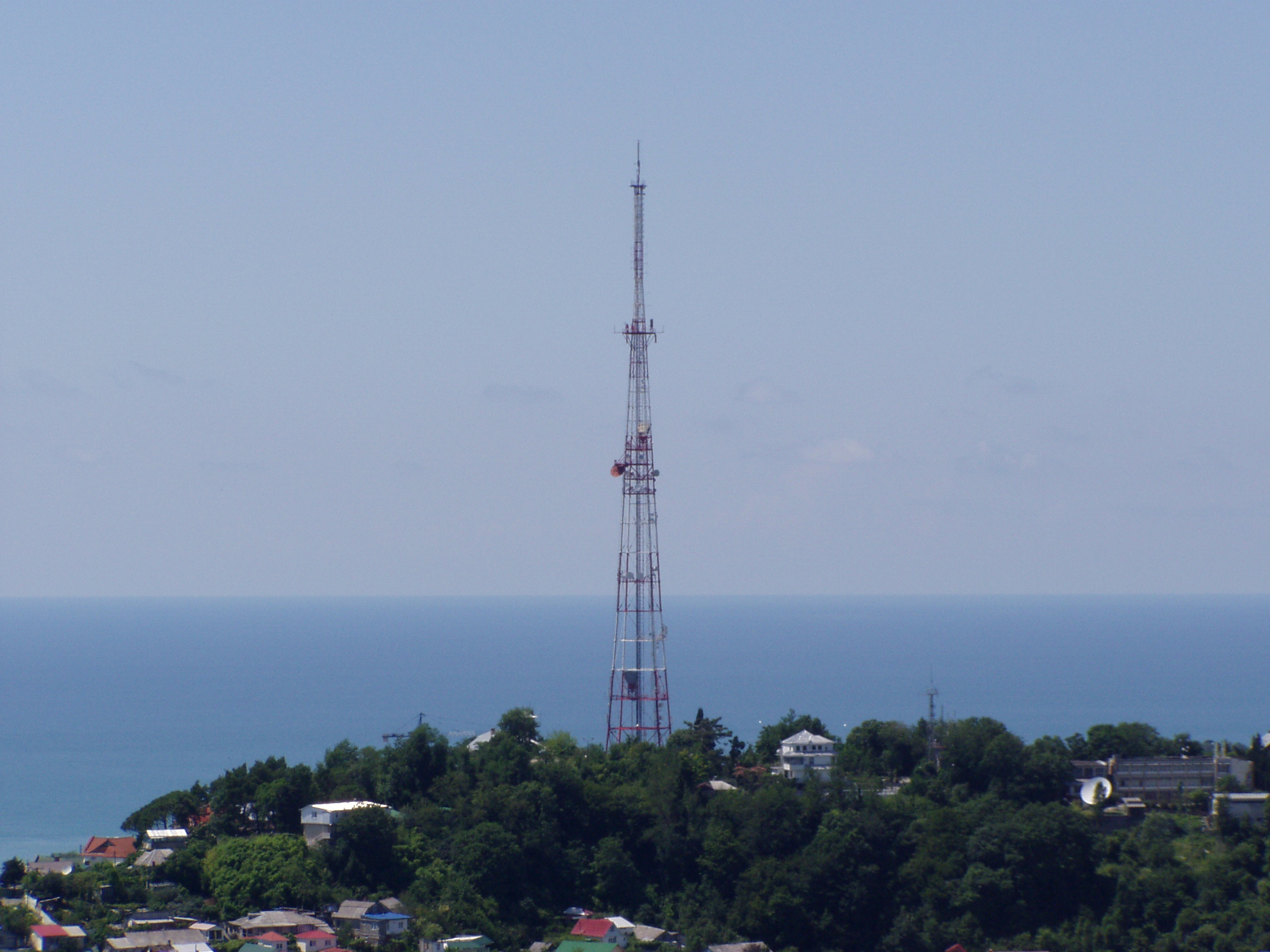
3803 KM type tower in Sochi

3803 KM is the designation of a free-standing lattice tower used for broadcasting purposes, which was built in over 80 towns of former Soviet Union from 1955 to 1972 and used for FM- and TV-broadcasting. Towers of this type, which was developed by the Soviet Institute for Steel Construction, are 4-side freestanding truss towers which make use of tubular steel columns for their main supports beams and can be differentiated from more recent towers of a similar profile by this unique feature. Most newer Russian designs along with their North American and European counterparts typical make use of L or T-beams instead. Another distinct feature of these towers is that they gradually taper wider towards the base at the same preset intervals. They are also nearly universally identical in height, with a few exceptions these towers are 180 meters tall to the top of the steel framework. Most of which are topped with broadcast antennas that adds some additional height and they have platforms at the 140 and 148 metres level for more antennas. Some 3803 KM only have a signal upper platform, but are otherwise identical in design.

Most of these towers are still in use today more than half a century after construction and are often the characteristic landmarks and tallest structure in the towns they reside in.

== List of 3803 KM radio towers ==
indicates a structure that is no longer standing.

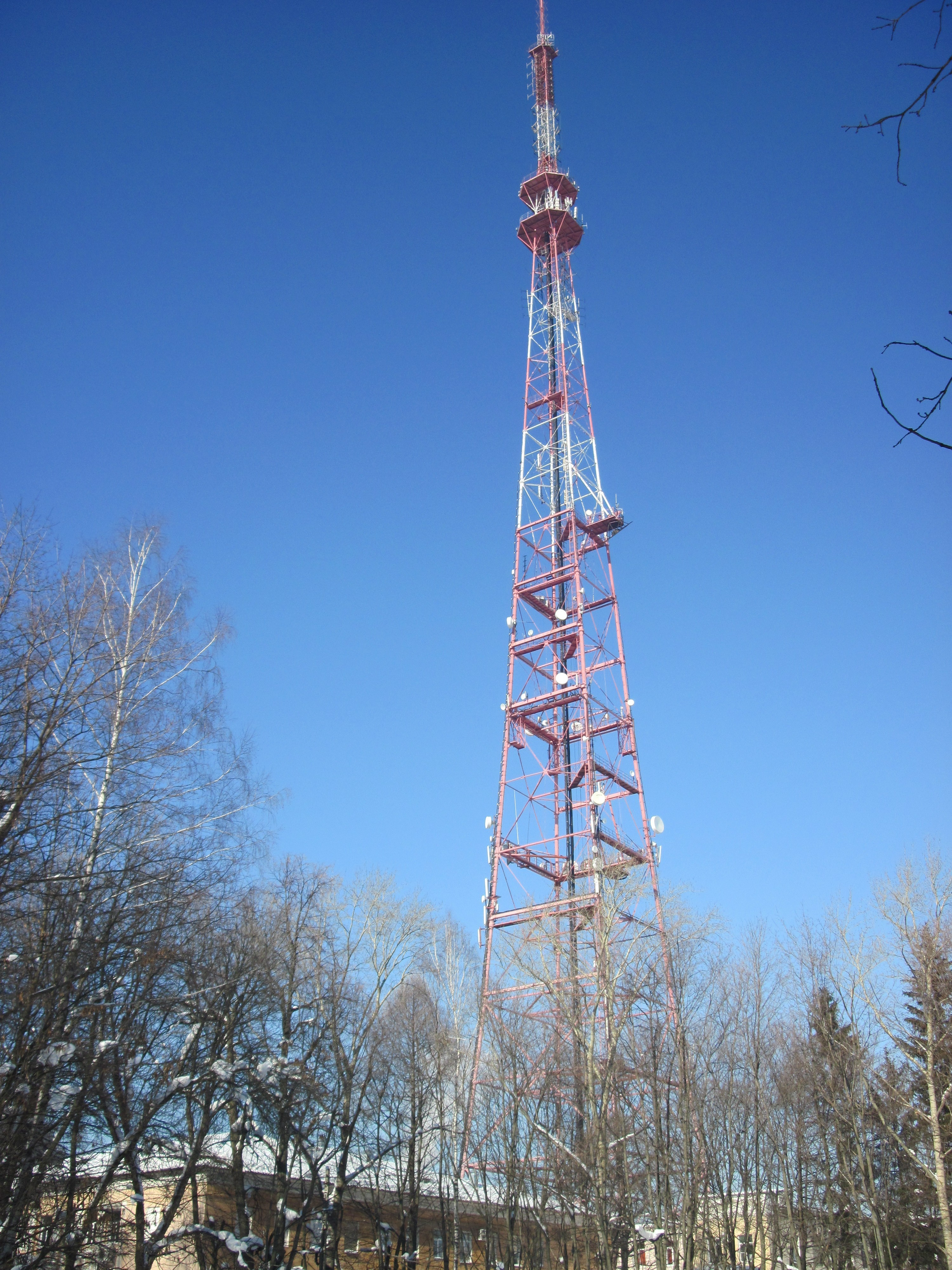
3803 KM type tower in Penza

Tower	Year	Country	Town	Height m	Height ft	design type	demolition
Edineţ TV Tower	?	Moldova	Edineţ	204 m	669 ft	4-sided, 3803 KM design	
Rezeknes TV Tower	?	Latvia	Rezeknes	204 m	669 ft	4-sided, 3803 KM design	
Klaipeda Radio and Television Station	1960	Lithuania	Klaipeda	202 m	663 ft	4-sided, 3803 KM design	
Odessa TV Tower	1958	Ukraine	Odessa	199 m	653 ft	4-sided, 3803 KM design single platform	
Novosibirsk TV Tower	1957	Russia	Novosibirsk	198 m	650 ft	4-sided, 3803 KM design	
Voronezh TV tower	1958	Russia	Voronezh	198 m	650 ft	4-sided, 3803 KM design	
Krasnodar TV Tower	1959	Russia	Krasnodar	197 m	646 ft	4-sided, 3803 KM design	
Old Yerevan TV Tower	1956	Armenia	Yerevan	196 m	643 ft	4-sided, 3803 KM design	demolition date unknown
Chelyabinsk TV tower	1958	Russia	Chelyabinsk	196 m	643 ft	4-sided, 3803 KM design	
Penza Television Centre Transmitter	1958	Russia	Penza	196 m	643 ft	4-sided, 3803 KM design	
Rostov TV Tower	1958	Russia	Rostov	196 m	643 ft	4-sided, 3803 KM design single platform	
Omsk TV tower	1959	Kazakhstan	Omsk	196 m	643 ft	4-sided, 3803 KM design	
Pärnu TV Tower	1963	Estonia	Pärnu	196 m	643 ft	4-sided, 3803 KM design	
Bryansk TV Tower	1958	Russia	Bryansk	194 m	637 ft	4-sided, 3803 KM design	
Dnipropetrovsk TV Tower	1958	Ukraine	Dnipropetrovsk	194 m	637 ft	4-sided, 3803 KM design single platform	
Luhansk TV Tower	1958	Ukraine	Luhansk	194 m	637 ft	4-sided, 3803 KM design single platform	
Kamenske TV Tower	1965	Ukraine	Kamenske	194 m	637 ft	4-sided, 3803 KM design	
Karaganda TV Tower	19	Kazakhstan	Qaragandy	194 m	635 ft	4-sided, 3803 KM design	
Mykolaiv TV Tower	1958	Ukraine	Mykolaiv	193 m	633 ft	4-sided, 3803 KM design single platform	
Bishkek TV Tower	1958	Kyrgyzstan	Bishkek	193 m	633 ft	4-sided, 3803 KM design	
Ulaanbaatar Radio Station Tower	1967	Mongolia	Ulaanbaatar	193 m	633 ft	4-sided, 3803 KM design	
Yekaterinburg TV Tower (Old)	1955	Russia	Yekaterinburg	192 m	630 ft	4-sided, 3803 KM design	
Tallinn TV Mast	1955	Estonia	Tallinn	192 m	630 ft	4-sided, 3803 KM design	dismantled in 1984
Baku Communication Tower	1956	Azerbaijan	Baku	192 m	630 ft	4-sided, 3803 KM design	demolished in 2008
Irkutsk TV Tower	1957	Russia	Irkutsk	192 m	630 ft	4-sided, 3803 KM design	
Murmansk TV Tower	1957	Russia	Murmansk	192 m	630 ft	4-sided, 3803 KM design	
Lviv TV Tower	1957	Ukraine	Lviv	192 m	630 ft	4-sided, 3803 KM design single platform	
Simferopol TV Tower	1958	Ukraine	Simferopol	192 m	630 ft	4-sided, 3803 KM design single platform	
Ulyanovsk TV tower	1959	Russia	Ulyanovsk	192 m	630 ft	4-sided, 3803 KM design	
Zaporizhzhya TV Tower	1959	Ukraine	Zaporizhzhya	192 m	630 ft	4-sided, 3803 KM design single platform	
Lipetsk TV tower	1960	Russia	Lipetsk	192 m	630 ft	4-sided, 3803 KM design	
Annunciation TV tower	1964	Russia	Blagoveshchensk	192 m	630 ft	4-sided, 3803 KM design	
Abakan TV Tower	1965	Russia	Abakan	192 m	630 ft	4-sided, 3803 KM design	
Almaty Old TV tower	?	Kazakhstan	Almaty	192 m	630 ft	4-sided, 3803 KM design	
Pavlodar TV tower	?	Kazakhstan	Pavlodar	192 m	630 ft	4-sided, 3803 KM design	
Tomsk TV tower	?	Russia	Tomsk	192 m	630 ft	4-sided, 3803 KM design	
Orissaare TV Tower	1965	Estonia	Orissaare	191 m	627 ft	4-sided, 3803 KM design	
Bratsk TV tower	1963	Russia	Bratsk	190 m	623 ft	4-sided, 3803 KM design	
Soinaste Telemast	1957	Estonia	Tartu	186 m	610 ft	4-sided, 3803 KM design	
Chisinau TV Tower	1958	Moldova	Chisinau	186 m	610 ft	4-sided, 3803 KM design	
Petrozavodsk TV Tower	1959	Russia	Petrozavodsk	186 m	610 ft	4-sided, 3803 KM design	
Semipalatinsk TV Tower	?	Kazakhstan	Semey	185 m	608 ft	4-sided, 3803 KM design	
Ekibastuz TV Tower	1967	Kazakhstan	Ekibastuz	185 m	607 ft	4-sided, 3803 KM design	
TV tower RTPTS Berezniki	1961	Russia	Berezniki	183 m	600 ft	4-sided, 3803 KM design	
Ryazan TV tower	1956	Russia	Ryazan	182.5 m	599 ft	4-sided, 3803 KM design	
Nizhny Novgorod TV tower	1957	Russia	Nizhny Novgorod	182 m	597 ft	4-sided, 3803 KM design	
Old Ufa TV Tower	1958	Russia	Ufa	182 m	597 ft	4-sided, 3803 KM design	
Kazan TV tower	1959	Russia	Kazan	182 m	597 ft	4-sided, 3803 KM design	
Tower on Mamayev Kurgan	1956	Russia	Volgograd	180 m	591 ft	4-sided, 3803 KM design	
Vladimirskaya TV tower	1956	Russia	Vladimirskaya	180 m	591 ft	4-sided, 3803 KM design	
Old Krasnoyarsk TV tower	1957	Russia	Krasnoyarsk	180 m	591 ft	4-sided, 3803 KM design	
Samara TV Tower	1957	Russia	Samara	180 m	591 ft	4-sided, 3803 KM design	
Kemerovo TV tower	1958	Russia	Kemerovo	180 m	591 ft	4-sided, 3803 KM design	
Sochi TV tower	1958	Russia	Sochi	180 m	591 ft	4-sided, 3803 KM design	
KRTPTS Eagle's Nest	1959	Russia	Vladivostok	180 m	591 ft	4-sided, 3803 KM design	
Arzamas TV tower	1960	Russia	Arzamas	180 m	591 ft	4-sided, 3803 KM design	
Tambov TV tower	1960	Russia	Tambov	180 m	591 ft	4-sided, 3803 KM design	
Yoshkar-Ola TV tower	1960	Russia	Yoshkar-Ola	180 m	591 ft	4-sided, 3803 KM design	
Astrakhan TV tower	1961	Russia	Astrakhan	180 m	591 ft	4-sided, 3803 KM design	
Cheboksary TV tower	1961	Russia	Cheboksary	180 m	591 ft	4-sided, 3803 KM design	
Kurgan TV tower	1961	Russia	Kurgan	180 m	591 ft	4-sided, 3803 KM design	
Leninsk-Kuznetsky TV tower	1962	Russia	Leninsk-Kuznetsky	180 m	591 ft	4-sided, 3803 KM design	
Magnitogorsk TV tower	1962	Russia	Magnitogorsk	180 m	591 ft	4-sided, 3803 KM design	
Novokuznetsk TV tower	1962	Russia	Novokuznetsk	180 m	591 ft	4-sided, 3803 KM design	
Tula TV Tower	1963	Russia	Tula	180 m	591 ft	4-sided, 3803 KM design	
Khabarovsk TV tower	1964	Russia	Khabarovsk	180 m	591 ft	4-sided, 3803 KM design	
Syktyvkar TV Tower	1964	Russia	Syktyvkar	180 m	591 ft	4-sided, 3803 KM design	
Donetsk TV Tower 2	1964	Ukraine	Donetsk	180 m	591 ft	4-sided, 3803 KM design	
Yarok TV and Radio Tower	1964	Ukraine	Yarok	180 m	591 ft	4-sided, 3803 KM design	
Nalchik TV Tower	1967	Russia	Nalchik	180 m	591 ft	4-sided, 3803 KM design	
Kotovsk Communication Tower	1972	Ukraine	Vesternychany	180 m	591 ft	4-sided, 3803 KM design	
Mezhdurechenskaya TV tower	1972	Russia	Mezhdurechensk	180 m	591 ft	4-sided, 3803 KM design	
Kuldiga TV Tower	?	Latvia	Kuldiga	180 m	591 ft	4-sided, 3803 KM design	
Aktobe TV Tower	?	Kazakhstan	Aktobe	180 m	591 ft	4-sided, 3803 KM design	
Ust-Kamenogorsk TV Tower	?	Kazakhstan	Oskemen	180 m	591 ft	4-sided, 3803 KM design	
Petropavlovsk TV Tower	?	Kazakhstan	Oskemen	180 m	591 ft	4-sided, 3803 KM design	
Makhachkala TV tower	?	Russia	Makhachkala	180 m	591 ft	4-sided, 3803 KM design	
Tobolsk TV Tower	?	Russia	Tobolsk	180 m	591 ft	4-sided, 3803 KM design	
Tyumen TV Tower	?	Russia	Tyumen	180 m	591 ft	4-sided, 3803 KM design	
Tashkent Old TV Tower	?	Uzbekistan	Tashkent	180 m	591 ft	4-sided, 3803 KM design	
Gyumri TV Tower	?	Armenia	Gyumri	180 m	591 ft	4-sided, 3803 KM design	
Smolensk TV Tower	1957	Russia	Smolensk	180 m	590 ft	4-sided, 3803 KM design, no mid-level platforms	
Ural TV tower	?	Kazakhstan	Uralsk	160 m	524 ft	4-sided, 3803 KM design, shortened	
Old Ust-Kamenogorsk TV tower	?	Kazakhstan	Oskemen	151 m	494 ft	4-sided, 3803 KM design, shortened	
Vorkuta TV tower	1958	Russia	Vorkuta	150 m	492 ft	4-sided, 3803 KM design, shortened	
Novgorod TV tower	1958	Russia	Novgorod	150 m	492 ft	4-sided, 3803 KM design, shortened	
