= Tamme Stadium =

Stadium in Tartu, Estonia

Coordinates: 58°21′59.53″N 26°42′49.42″E

Tamme staadion
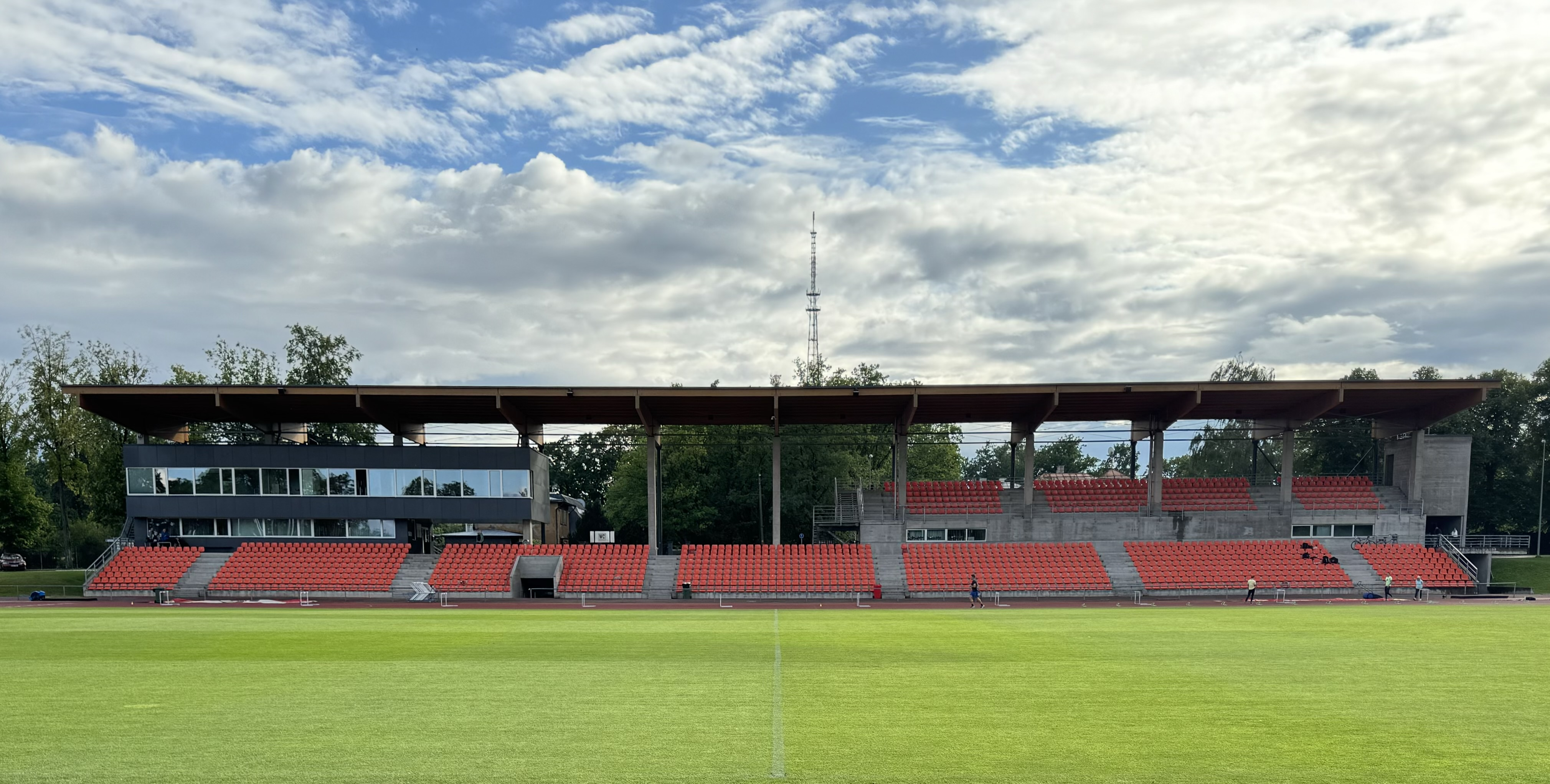
- Interactive map of Tamme staadion
- Location: Tartu, Estonia
- Owner: City of Tartu
- Capacity: 1,750
- Surface: Grass
- Field size: 105 m × 68 m (344 ft × 223 ft)

Construction
- Opened: 1932; 94 years ago
- Renovated: 1936, 1949, 2007–2008, 2010–2011
- Cost: €4 million (2011)
- Architects: Arnold Matteus; Andres Siim (2011)

Tenants
- Tartu Olümpia (1932–1940); Tartu Tammeka (1989–present)

Tamme Stadium (Estonian: Tamme staadion) is a multi-purpose stadium in Tartu, Estonia, located in the district of Tammelinn. First opened in 1932 and reaching its current look in 2011, the stadium is home to Tartu Tammeka and holds 1,750 people.

Tamme Stadium's original grandstand was completed in 1936, but was destroyed in a fire in 1998. The current grandstand was built in 2010–2011.

== History ==
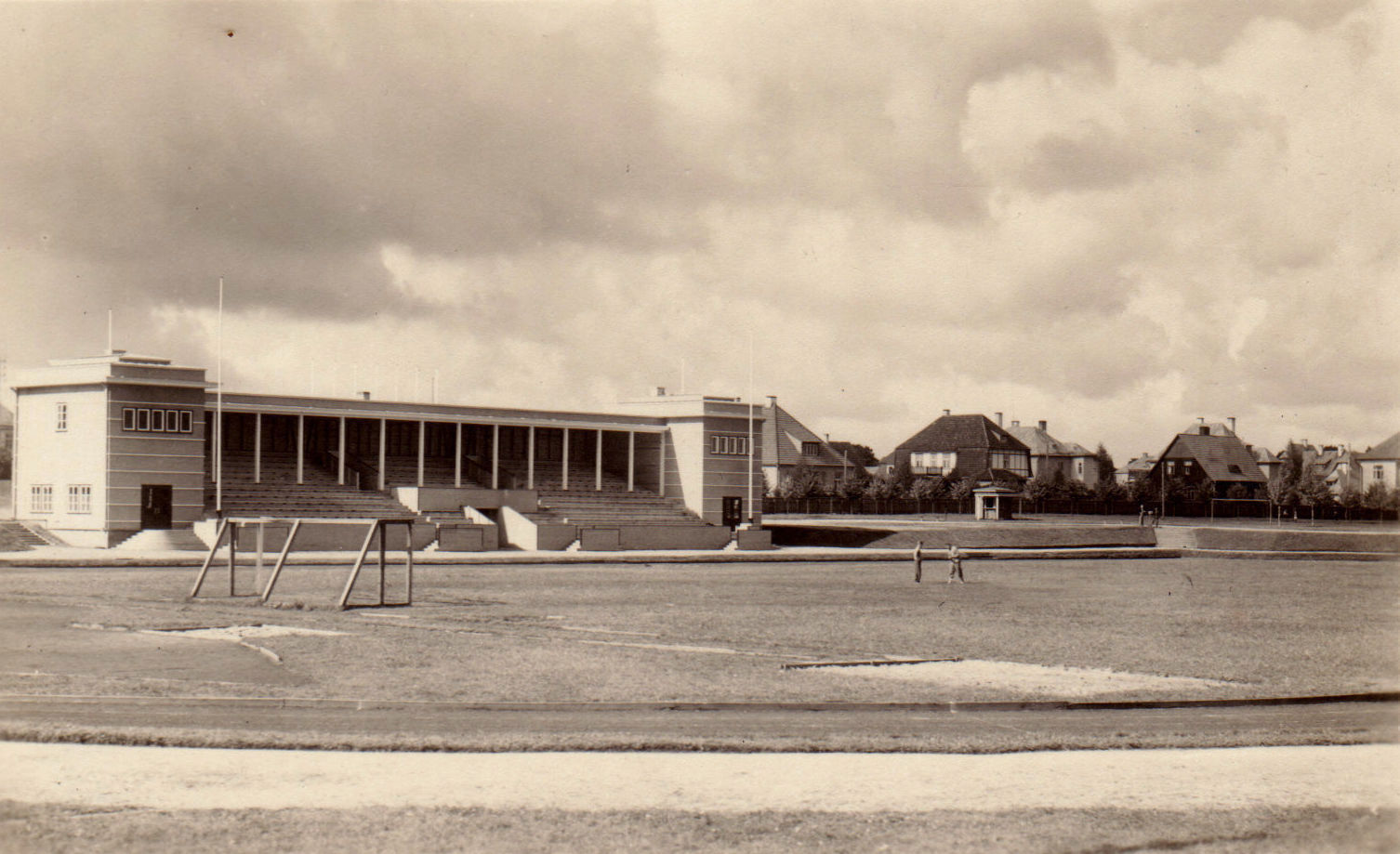
Tamme Stadium's original grandstand (1936–1998)

=== Original grandstand ===
The original sports park was designed in 1928 by the renowned Tartu architect Arnold Matteus. The work was completed in 1932 and in 1936, a grandstand was added. After its completion, Tamme Stadium became the primary sports ground of Tartu and in the next two decades hosted numerous national and international athletics competitions. Until 1954, the stadium was also used as a venue for the Tartumaa Song Festivals, which at its peak saw attendances of around 30,000 people.

In football, Tamme Stadium was the home ground for Tartu Olümpia, who became the Estonian champions in 1940, after beating Tallinna Kalev 3–1 in the final round of the 1939–40 Estonian Football Championship season. Until this day, Tartu Olümpia are the only non-Tallinn team that has lifted the Estonian Football Championship title.

After the construction of the Stadium of Tartu University in 1957, Tartu's sports life moved away from Tammelinn until Tamme Stadium was reconstructed in 2011 and the stadium once again retained its title as the city's primary stadium.

The stadium was extensively renovated in the 1960s and reopened in 1973. However in June 1998, a major fire destroyed most of the historic wooden grandstand which was also under cultural heritage protection. The ruins were demolished and a design competition for a new building was held in 1999, which was won by architects Andres Siim and Kristel Ausing.

=== 2011 reconstruction ===
The reconstruction of Tamme Stadium began in 2007 with the renovation of the running track and sports ground. The construction of the new grandstand commenced in May 2010 and was completed by May 2011. The construction cost about 4 million euros, of which €1.6 million was for the grandstand.

Tamme stadium was one of the host venues for the 2012 Baltic Cup, for which a temporary 1,950-seat stand was erected on the opposite side of the grandstand, temporarily raising the stadium's total capacity to 3,595. On 3 July 2014, the stadium hosted its first and only UEFA Europa League qualification match, when Estonian third-tier club Tartu Santos faced Tromsø in front of 1,169 spectators. It was also one of the venues for the 2023 UEFA Women's U17 Championship.

== Estonia national team matches ==
Tartu Tamme Stadium has hosted the Estonia national football team twice, with both matches taking place in June 2012.

| Date | | Result | Competition | Attendance |
|---|---|---|---|---|
| 1 June 2012 | Estonia – Finland | 1–2 | 2012 Baltic Cup | 2,470 |
| 3 June 2012 | Estonia – Lithuania | 1–0 | 2012 Baltic Cup | 1,096 |

== Gallery ==
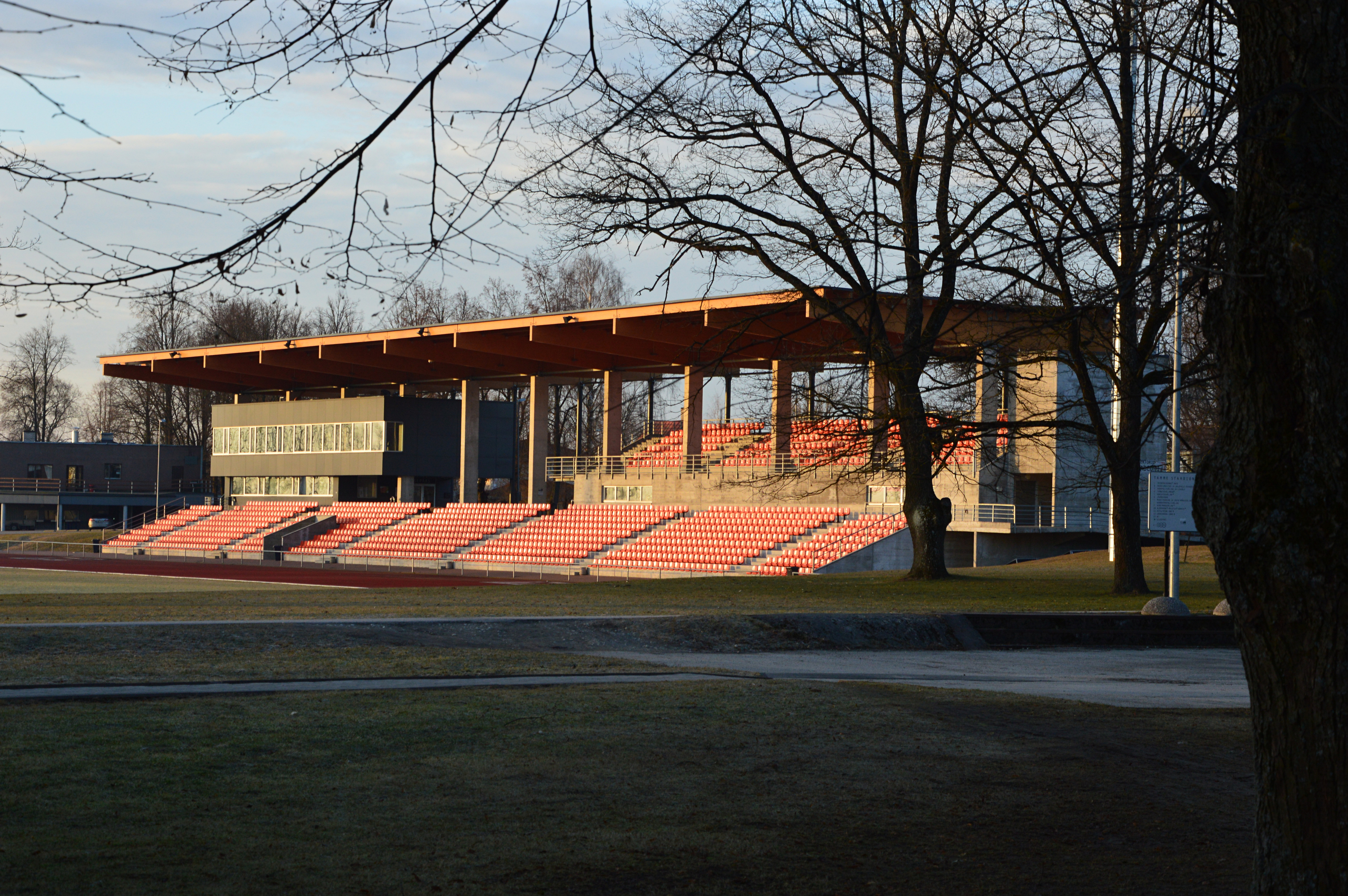

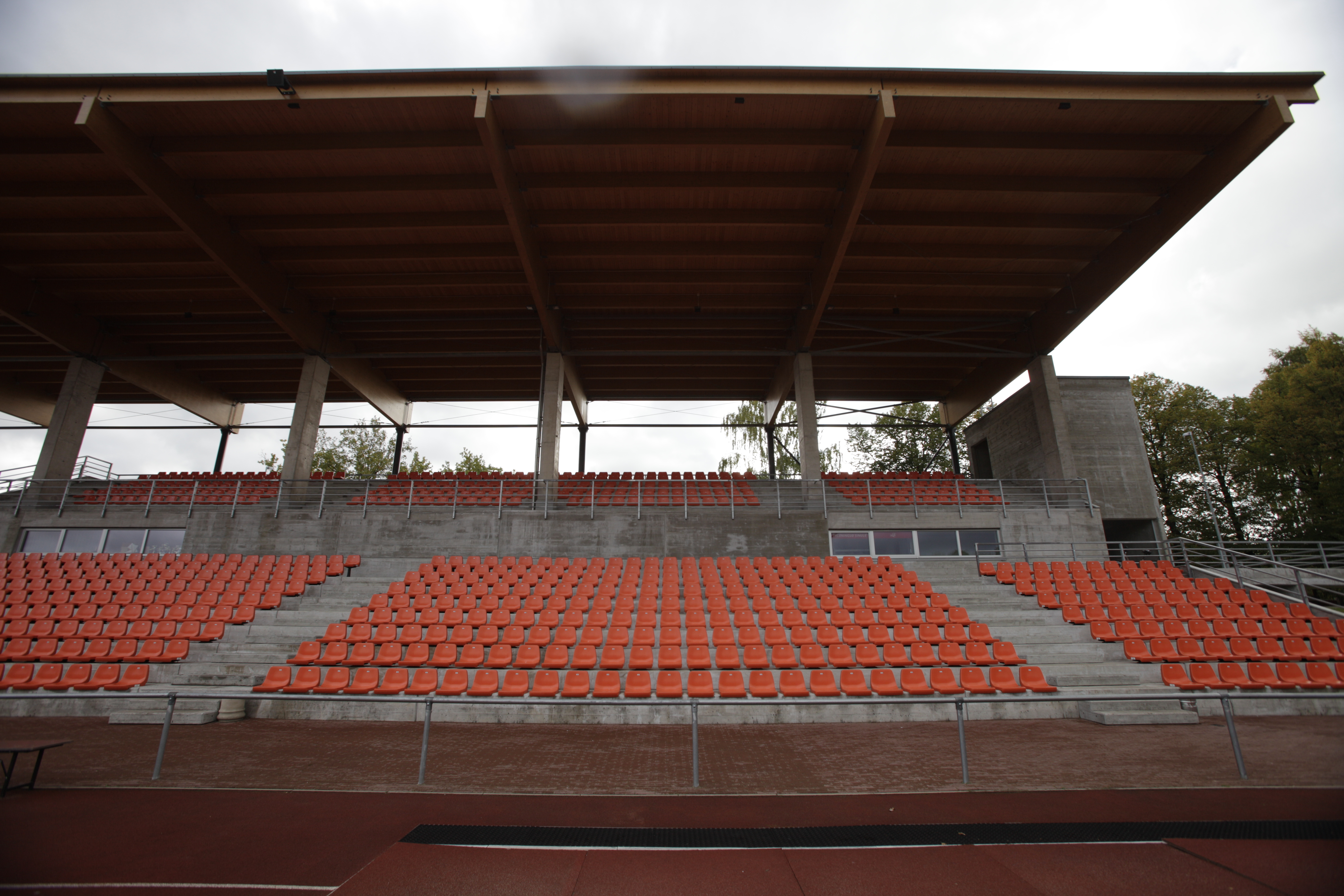

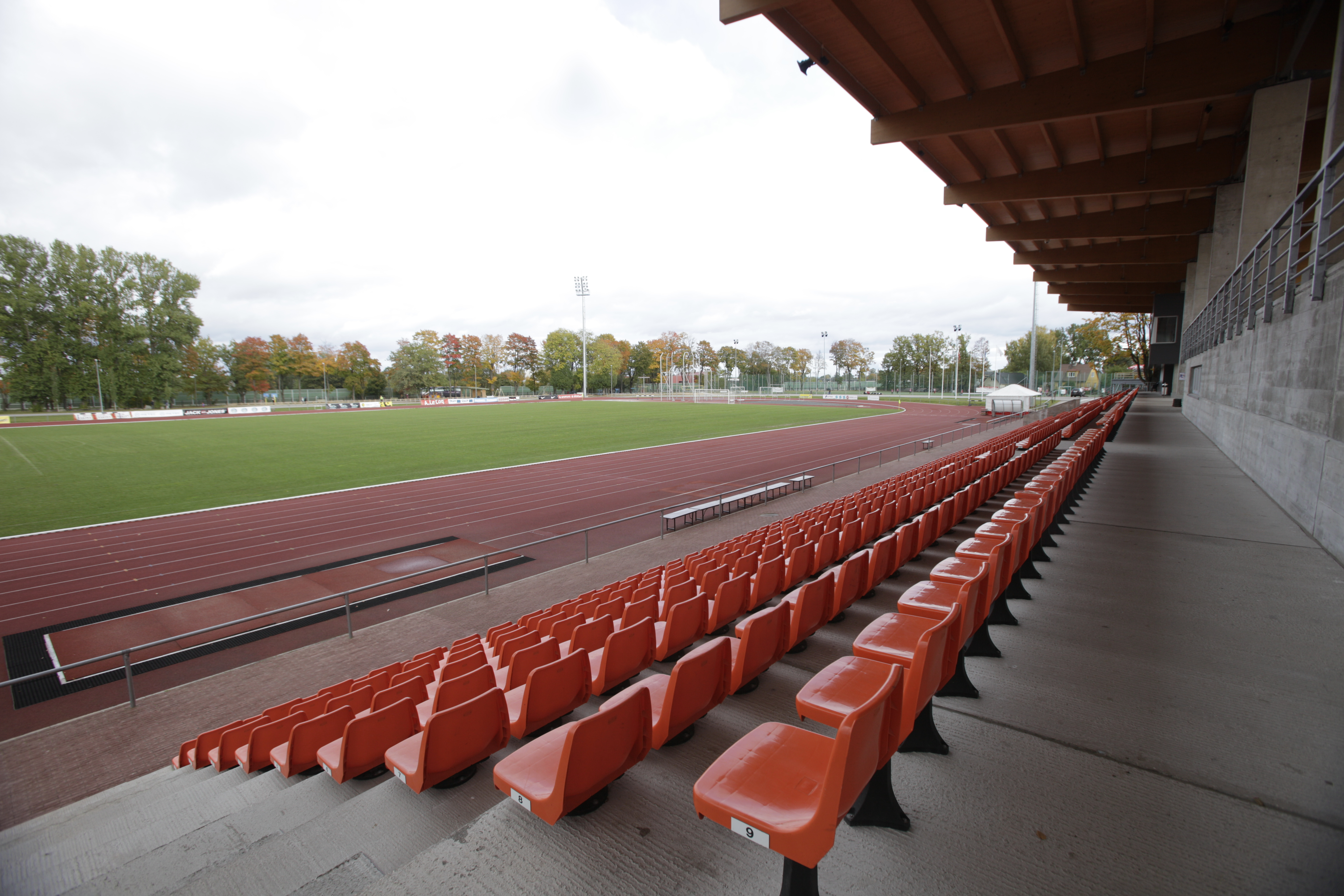

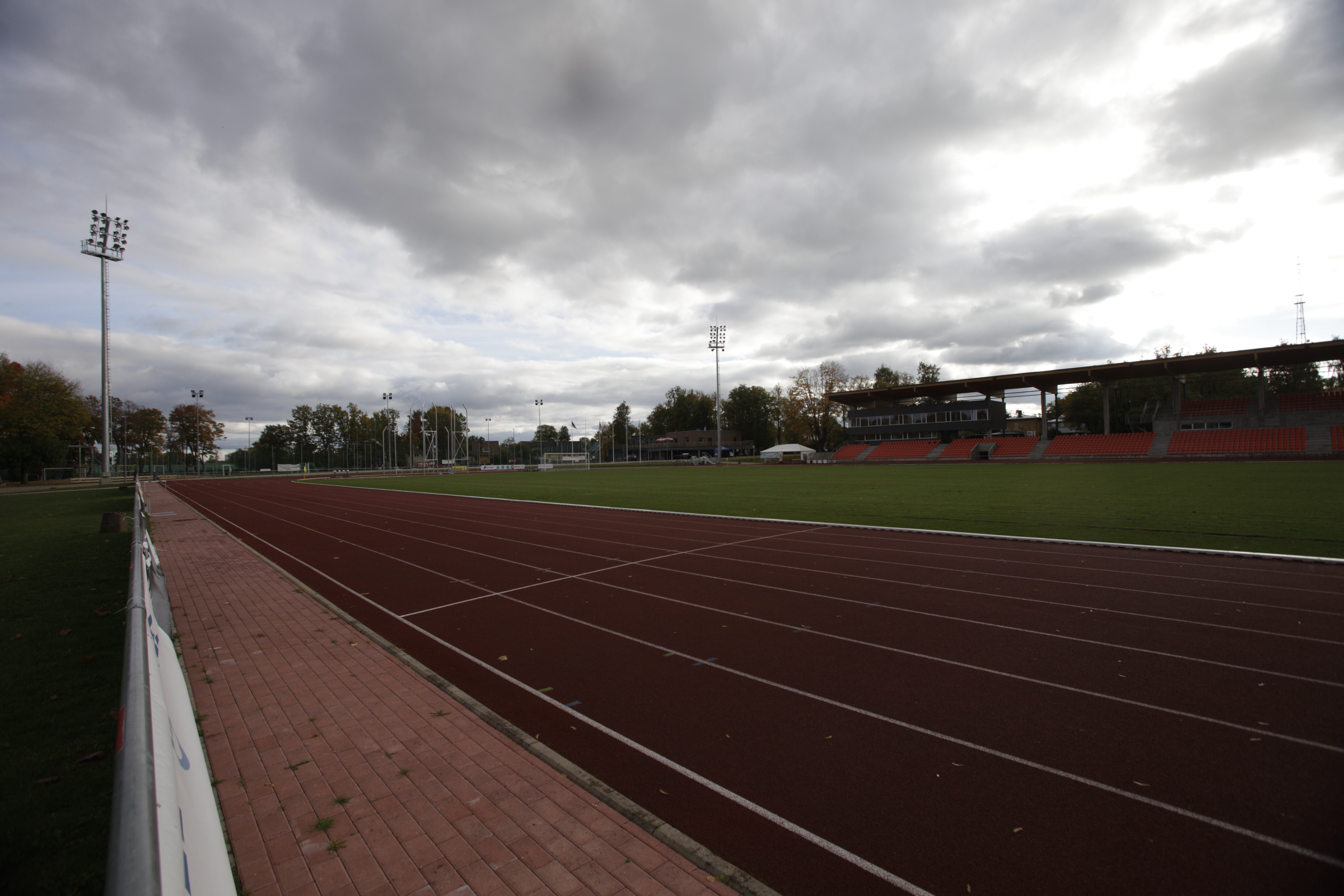
