= Elise Aun =

Estonian poet and writer

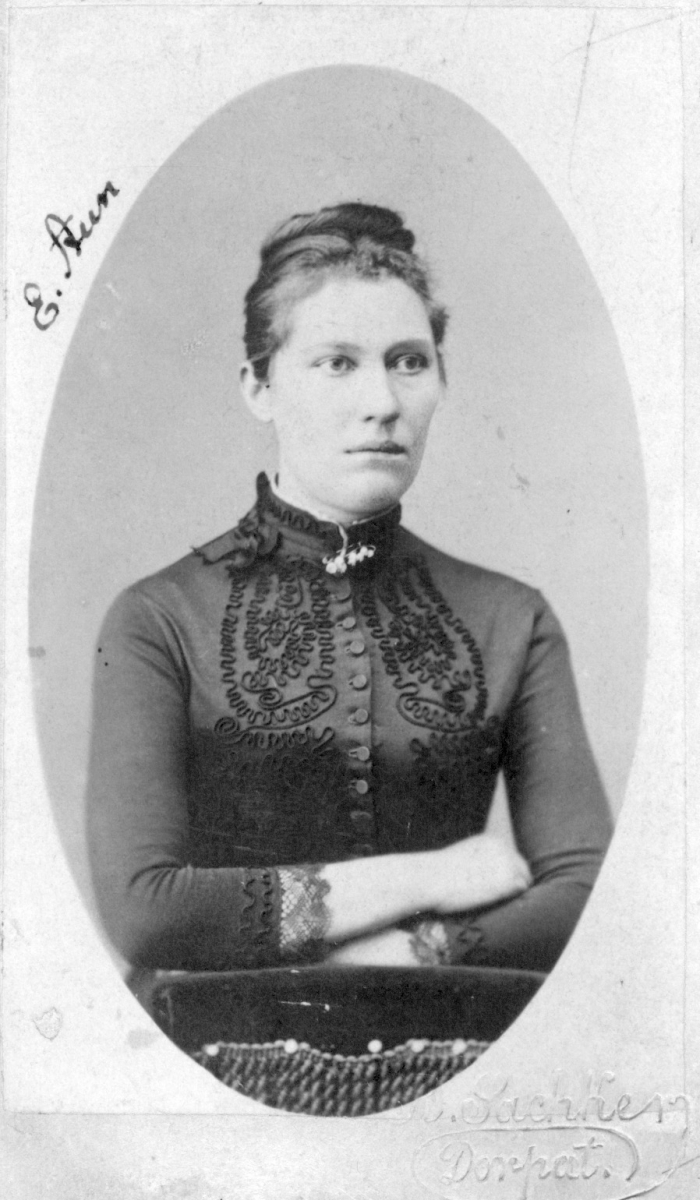
Image of Elise Rosalie Aun

Elise Aun (15 June 1863 – 2 June 1932) was an Estonian poet and writer; one of the most notable women writers in 19th-century Estonia.

Elise Rosalie Aun was born in Pikareinu, Valgjärve Parish (now, Kanepi Parish), Põlva County in 1863. In 1882, she graduated from Räpina Parish Girls' School. After graduating, she was unable to find steady work and did different small jobs in the 1880s and the 1890s. In 1902, she became an outlet manager for the Christian Popular Literature Agency in Tallinn. In 1903, she married the schoolteacher Friedrich Raup.

== Works ==
- 1888: Kibuvitsa õied (Rosehip Blossoms), poetry collection
- 1890: Laane linnuke (Forest Bird), poetry collection
- 1890: Metsalilled (Forest Flowers), poetry collection
- 1895: Kibuvitsa õied II (Rosehip Blossoms II), poetry collection
- 1901: Kibuvitsa õied III (Rosehip Blossoms III), poetry collection
