= Tammelinn =

Neighbourhood of Tartu, Estonia

Coordinates: 58°21′35.67″N 26°42′9.41″E

- Neighbourhood of Tartu
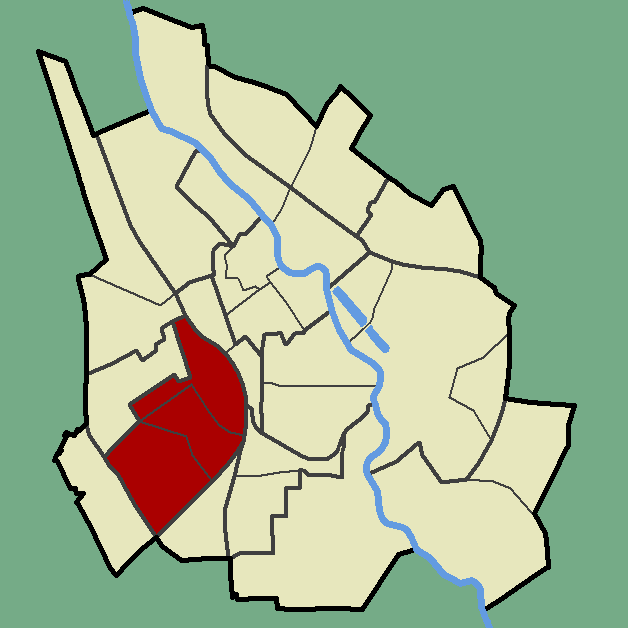
- Location of Tammelinn in Tartu.
- Country: Estonia
- County: Tartu County
- City: Tartu

Area
  - Total: 3.11 km^{2} (1.20 sq mi)

Population (31.12.2013)
  - Total: 8,153
  - Density: 2,620/km^{2} (6,790/sq mi)

Drone video of Tammelinn in Tartu (September 2021)

Tammelinn (Estonian for 'oak town') is a neighbourhood of Tartu, Estonia. It has a population of 8,153 (as of 31 December 2013) and an area of 3.11 km^{2} (1.20 mi^{2}).

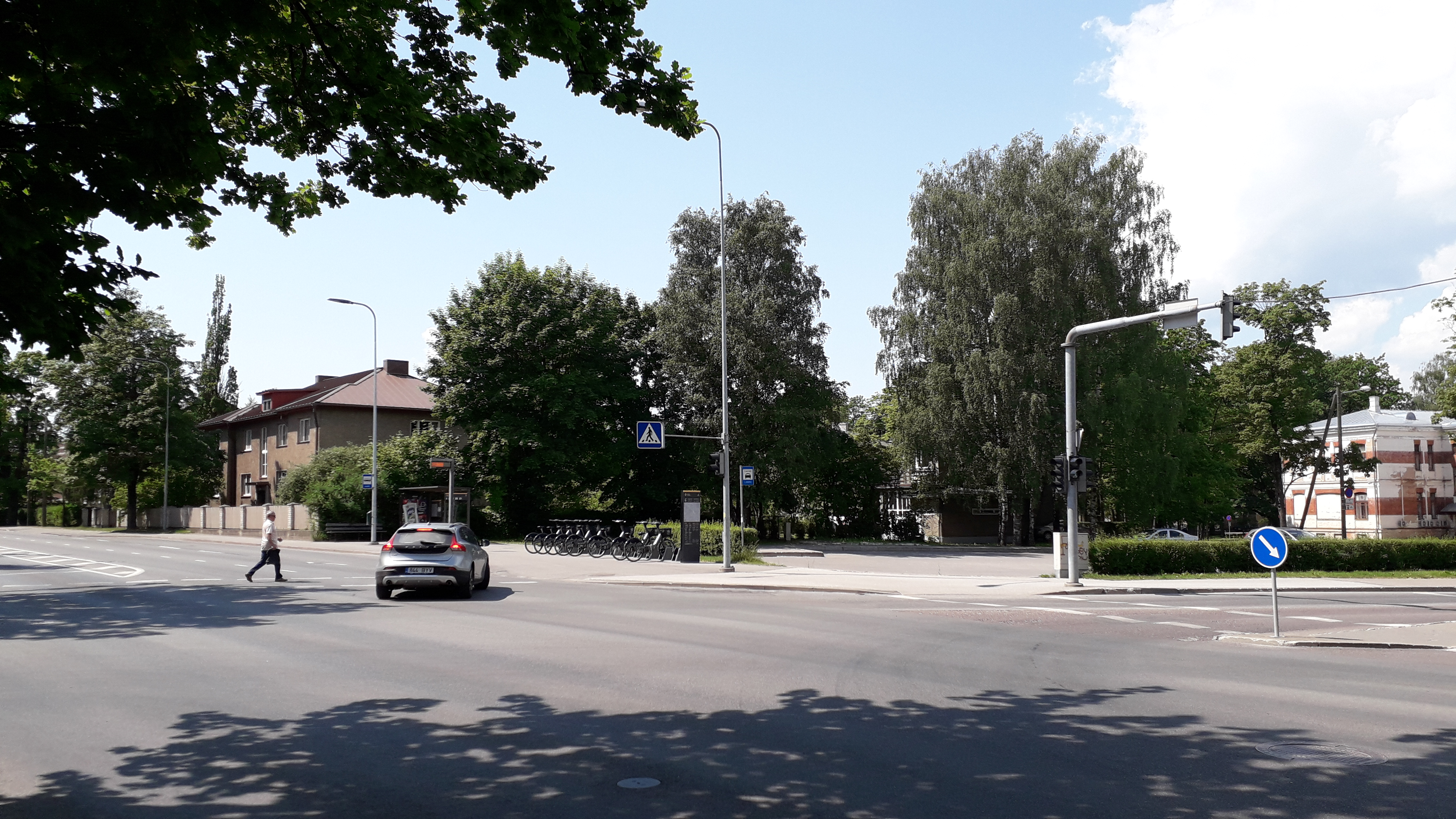
Riia tänav Tammelinnas

== Gallery ==
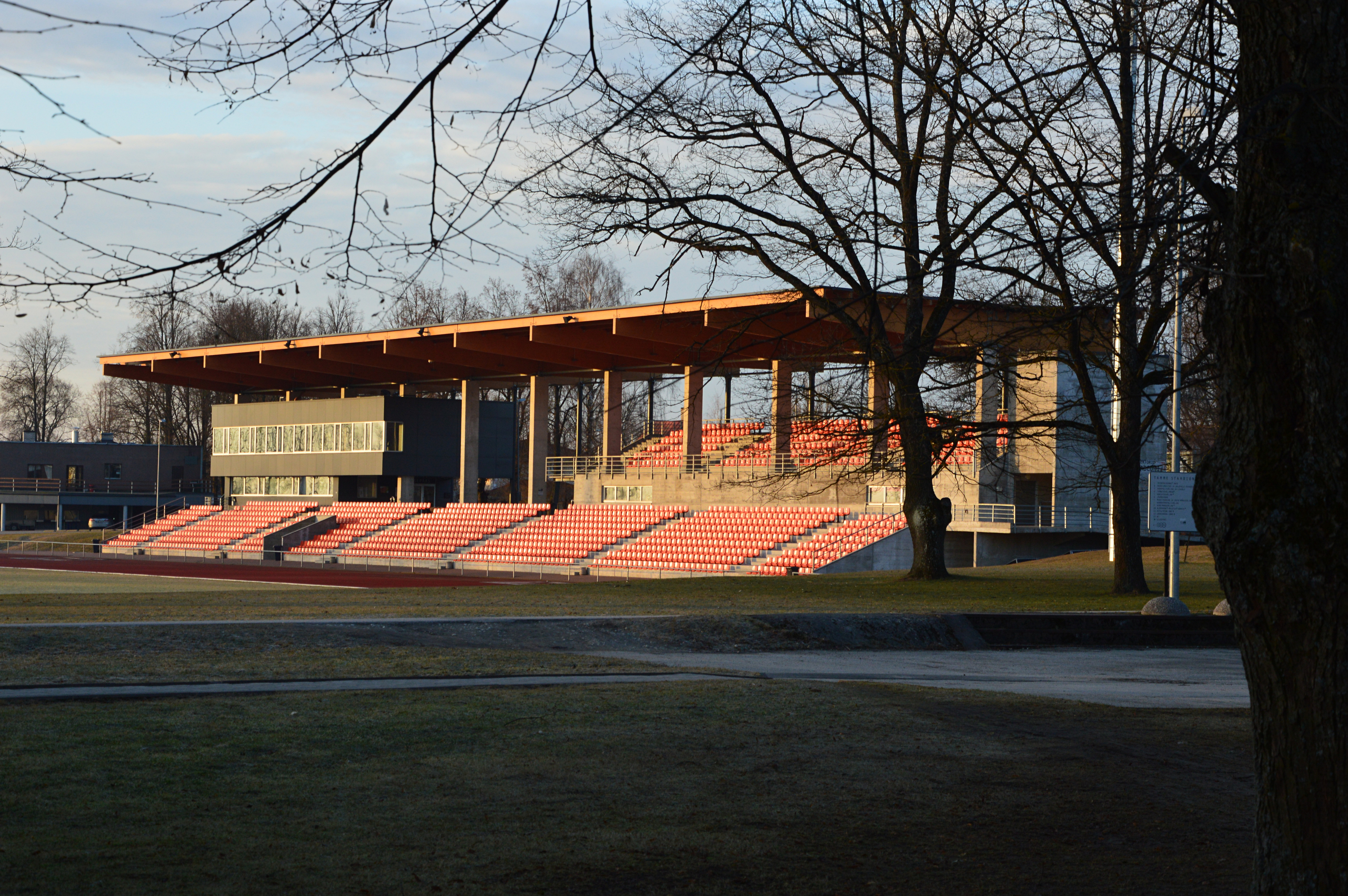

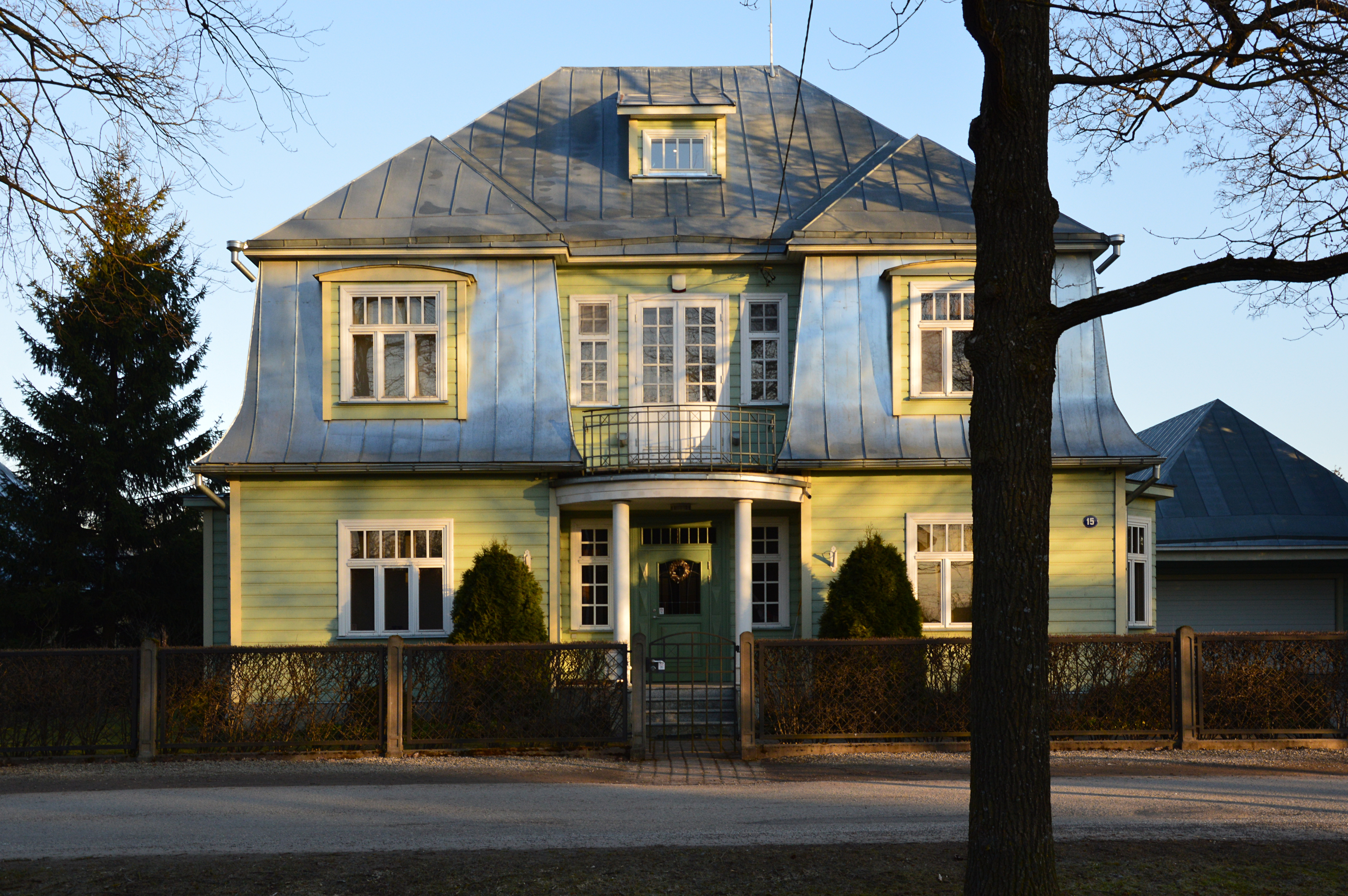

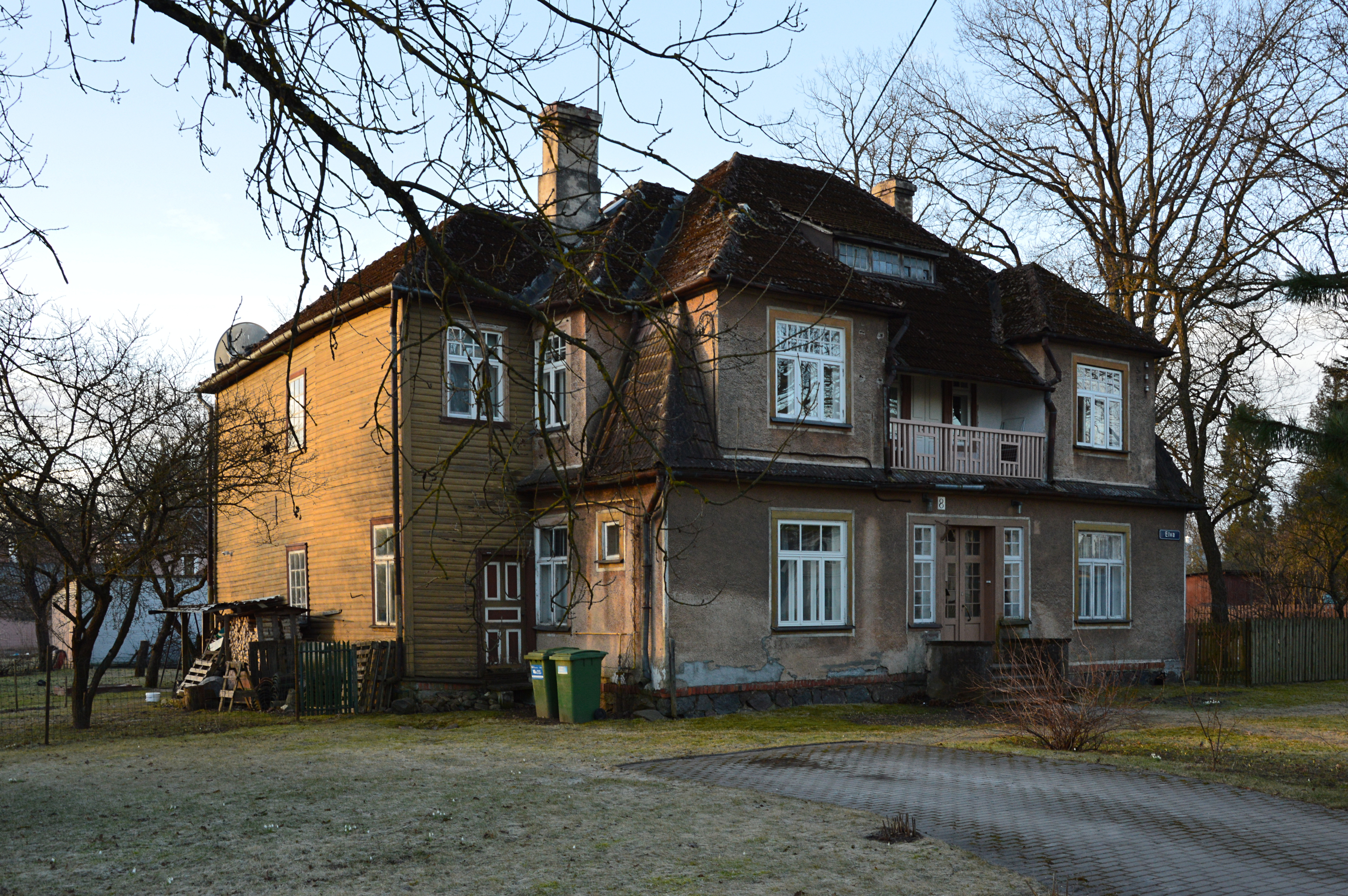

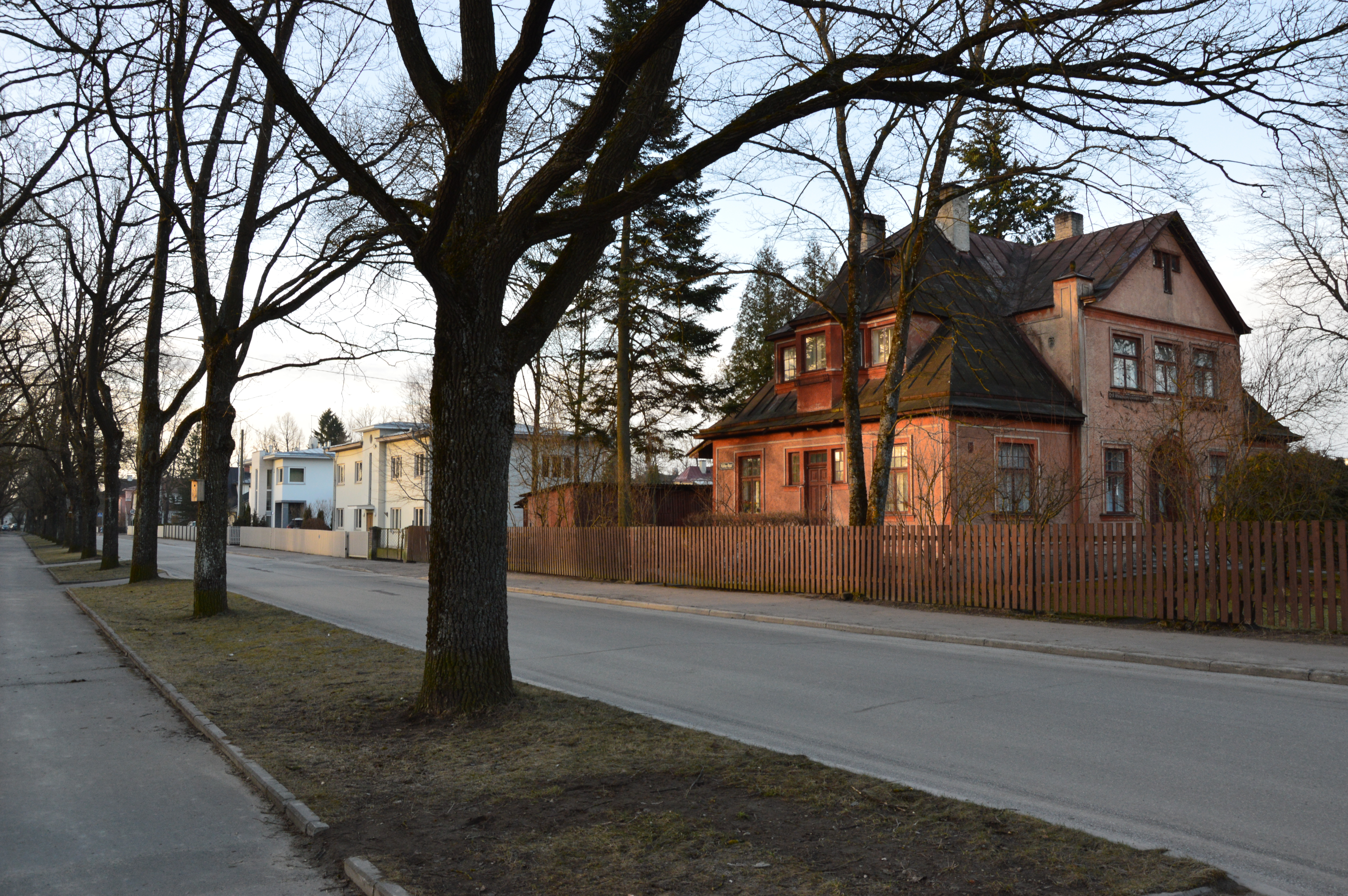

== See also ==
- Tamme Stadium
- Tartu TV Mast
