= Sõrve Peninsula =

Peninsula in Estonia

Coordinates: 58°10′43″N 22°15′29″E

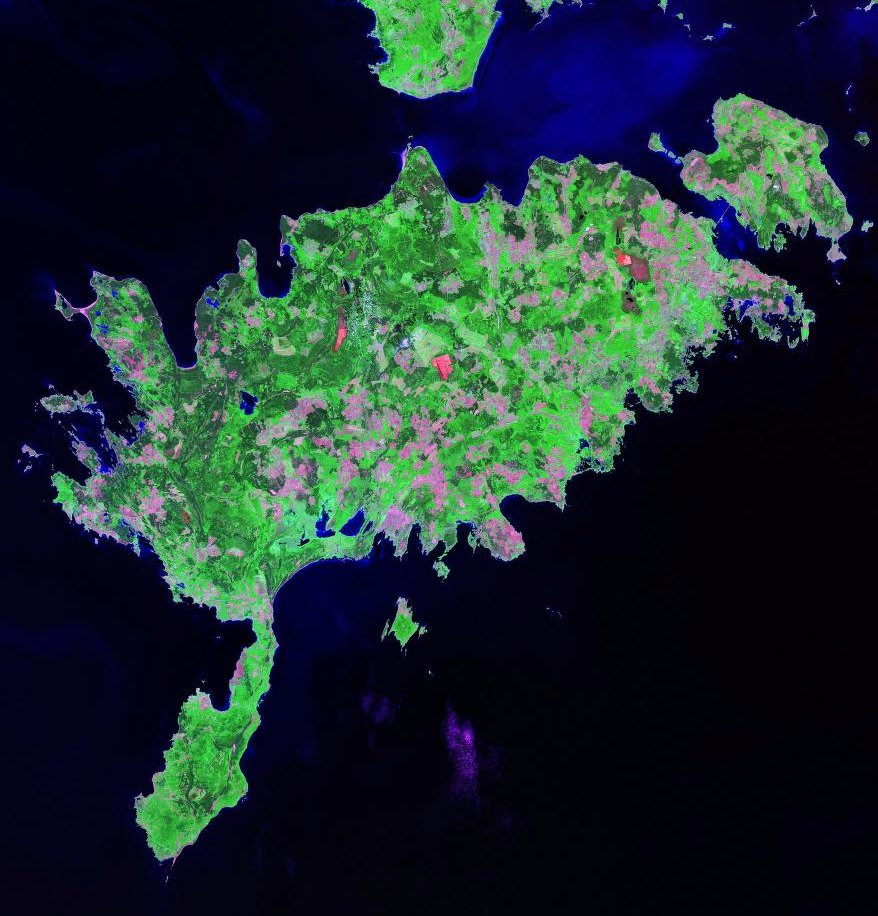
Landsat satellite photo of Saaremaa, with the Sõrve Peninsula in the south

Sõrve (Estonian: Sõrve or Sörve) is a peninsula which forms the southernmost section of the Estonian island Saaremaa in the Baltic Sea. Its length is 32 km, and its maximum width 10 km. South of it lies the Irbe Strait, the main entrance to the Gulf of Riga.

== Name ==
The Sõrve Peninsula was attested in historical documents as Svorve in 1234, Zworbe in 1240, tho Zorvell in 1453, up Schworv in 1545, Serwe ma in 1782, and Serwe Maa in 1798. The name Sõrve is believed to be related to the word serv (genitive: serva) and its variant sõrv (genitive: sõrva, sõrve) 'edge, border, margin'. The peninsula is also locally known as Sörve, reflecting the lack of the phoneme /õ/ in the Saaremaa dialect.

== History ==
Historically, the peninsula had considerable military significance, dominating the Irbe Strait and the sea route to Riga. In the beginning of the 20th century a number of coastal artillery batteries were installed on the peninsula.

During World War I, Sõrve was conquered by the Imperial German Army in October 1917 (Operation Albion) and remained occupied by Germans until the end of hostilities in November 1918. Thereafter Sõrve, along with the entire island of Saaremaa, became part of the newly independent Republic of Estonia. During World War II, the peninsula was first occupied by the Soviet Red Army in June 1940 and, along with the rest of Estonian territory, formally annexed into the Stalinist USSR in August 1940. The peninsula was invaded and occupied by Nazi Germany in the 1941 Operation Beowulf. The peninsula saw heavy fighting between the invading Soviet and defending German forces in October and November 1944 (Moonsund Landing Operation). In 1946, the Soviet military authorities declared Sõrve a restricted "border zone" access to which was prohibited to any civilians, except the small remaining local population. Sõrve remained a restricted area until 1989. Estonia restored full independence in August 1991.

== Nature ==
The Sõrve Peninsula is known for its unique and special natural attractions. Many rare species of birds, flowers and insects can be found throughout Sõrve.

== Demographics ==
Only about 400 permanent residents live in Sõrve throughout the year, whereas before World War II the population was larger by almost an order of magnitude and at times Sõrve had then been the most densely inhabited rural area in Estonia. In the 21st century, the peninsula has become a major tourist destination.

== Climate ==
Climate data for Sõrve Peninsula (normals 1991–2020, extremes 1866–present)
Month	Jan	Feb	Mar	Apr	May	Jun	Jul	Aug	Sep	Oct	Nov	Dec	Year
Record high °C (°F)	7.9 (46.2)	8.8 (47.8)	13.2 (55.8)	20.9 (69.6)	26.8 (80.2)	30.0 (86.0)	30.0 (86.0)	28.5 (83.3)	25.3 (77.5)	18.7 (65.7)	14.3 (57.7)	10.1 (50.2)	30.0 (86.0)
Mean daily maximum °C (°F)	1.2 (34.2)	0.4 (32.7)	2.4 (36.3)	7.2 (45.0)	12.9 (55.2)	17.2 (63.0)	20.4 (68.7)	20.1 (68.2)	16.1 (61.0)	10.7 (51.3)	6.3 (43.3)	3.3 (37.9)	9.8 (49.6)
Daily mean °C (°F)	−0.5 (31.1)	−1.4 (29.5)	0.4 (32.7)	4.4 (39.9)	9.6 (49.3)	14.2 (57.6)	17.5 (63.5)	17.6 (63.7)	13.9 (57.0)	8.7 (47.7)	4.7 (40.5)	1.6 (34.9)	7.5 (45.5)
Mean daily minimum °C (°F)	−2.4 (27.7)	−3.3 (26.1)	−1.7 (28.9)	2.2 (36.0)	6.9 (44.4)	11.6 (52.9)	14.8 (58.6)	15.0 (59.0)	11.6 (52.9)	6.7 (44.1)	3.0 (37.4)	−0.2 (31.6)	5.3 (41.5)
Record low °C (°F)	−29.5 (−21.1)	−29.7 (−21.5)	−26.4 (−15.5)	−14.4 (6.1)	−4.6 (23.7)	1.4 (34.5)	5.5 (41.9)	6.0 (42.8)	−0.3 (31.5)	−5.3 (22.5)	−11 (12)	−24.1 (−11.4)	−29.7 (−21.5)
Average precipitation mm (inches)	41 (1.6)	33 (1.3)	31 (1.2)	28 (1.1)	38 (1.5)	48 (1.9)	62 (2.4)	75 (3.0)	53 (2.1)	70 (2.8)	64 (2.5)	47 (1.9)	590 (23.2)
Average precipitation days (≥ 1.0 mm)	10	7	8	7	6	7	8	9	11	12	14	12	112
Average relative humidity (%)	87	87	84	82	80	82	82	81	82	83	87	86	84
Source: Estonian Weather Service (precipitation days 1971–2000)

== Lighthouse ==
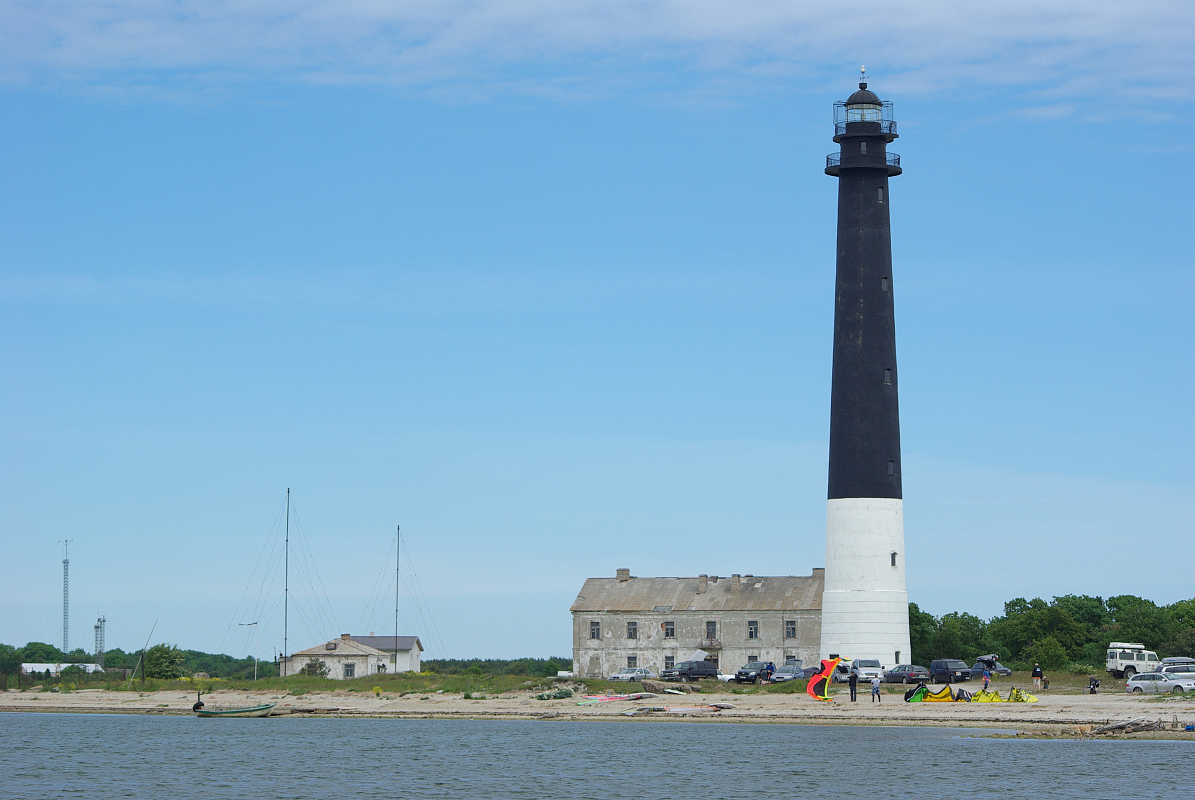
View of Sõrve lighthouse from the southernmost tip of the peninsula.

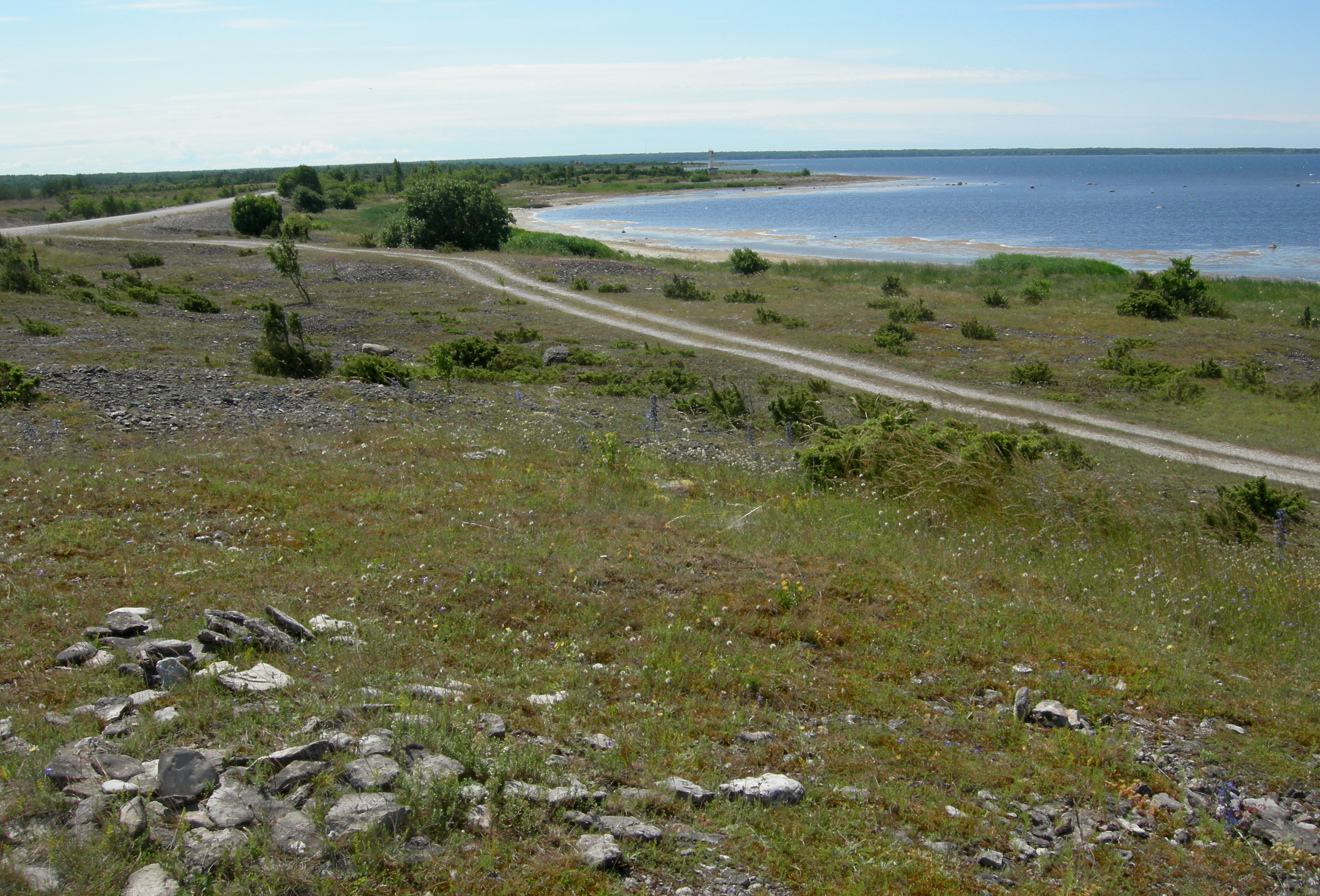
Beach in northwestern Sõrve Peninsula

The current lighthouse on Sõrve säär ("tip of Sõrve", known for its shingle beach), a cylindrical concrete tower, was built in 1960 to replace a square stone lighthouse built in 1770, and subsequently destroyed during World War II in 1944. In 1945, a temporary wooden lighthouse was built to serve during the period between two permanent lighthouses.

== Sources ==
- Barrett, Michael B (2007). Operation Albion: the German conquest of the Baltic Islands. Indiana University Press. ISBN 978-0-253-34969-9.
- Halpern, Paul (1994). A Naval History of World War I. UCL Press. ISBN 1-85728-295-7.
- Staff, Gary (2009). Battle for the Baltic Islands. Pen and Sword. ISBN 978-1-85728-295-5.
