= Valgjärve TV Mast =

347 metres high guyed mast in Estonia

Coordinates: 58°5′49.93″N 26°40′41.81″E

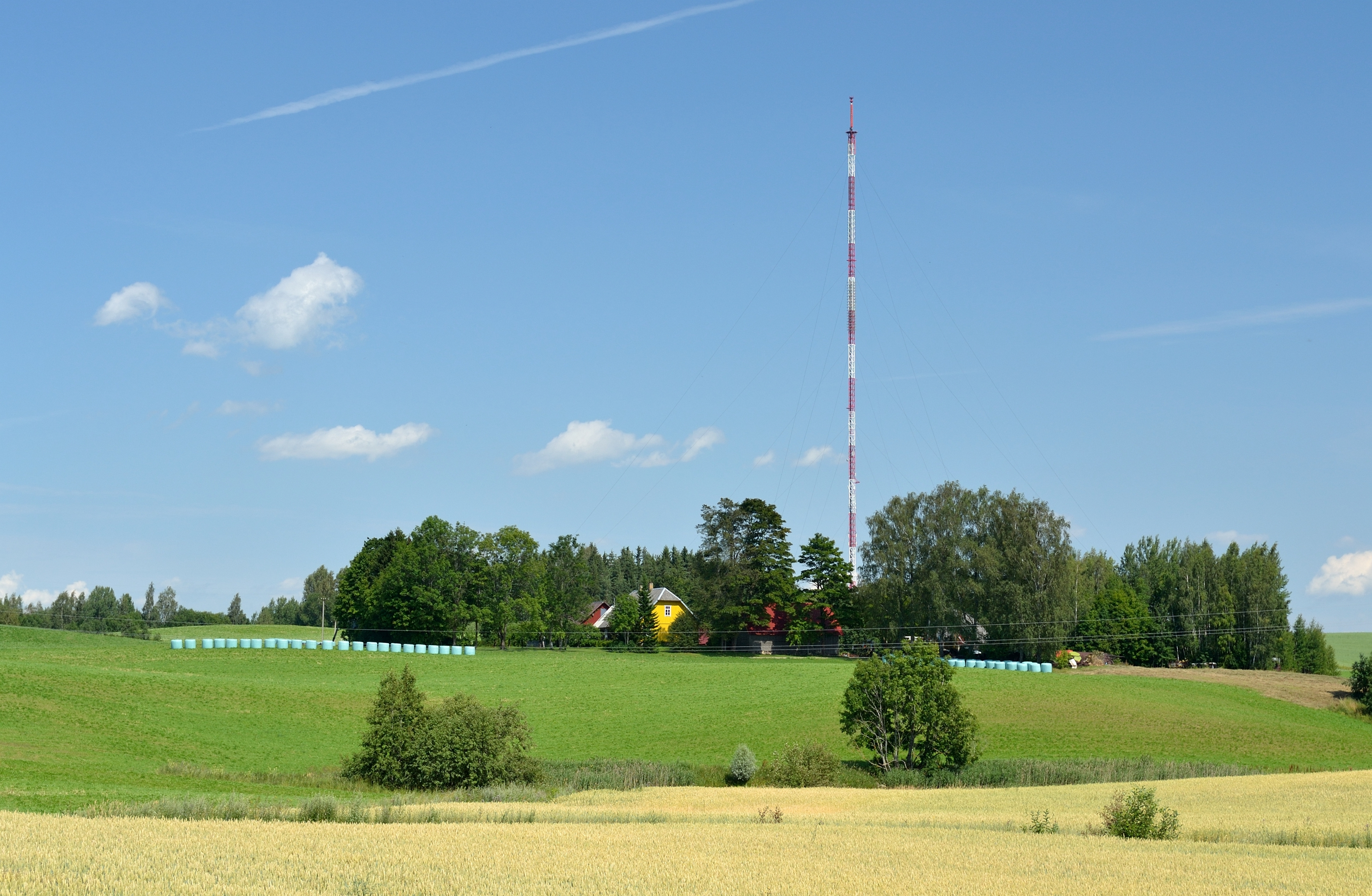
Valgjärve TV Mast

The Valgjärve TV Mast (Estonian: Valgjärve telemast) is a 347 m high guyed mast in Southern Estonia. It is located in Pikareinu in Valgjärve Parish, Põlva County and was built in June 1988. At the time, it was the tallest structure in the Baltics.

The Valgjärve TV Mast is the second-tallest structure in Estonia after the Koeru TV Mast.
