= Arnold Matteus =

Estonian architect (1897–1986)

- Born: 13 December 1897; Võru Parish, Russian Empire
- Died: 30 November 1986 (aged 88)
- Education: Technische Universität Darmstadt
- Occupation: Architect
- Notable work: Tamme Stadium; Oskar Luts Home Museum; Ugala konvendihoone

Arnold Matteus (13 December 1897 – 30 November 1986) was an Estonian architect known for his significant contributions to the architectural landscape of Tartu, Estonia. He studied architecture in Germany and later served as the chief architect during various governmental administrations. Matteus was revered not only for his architectural prowess but also for his diplomatic demeanor, creative genius, and adeptness at finding compromises. Additionally, he participated in the Estonian War of Independence, highlighting his commitment to his nation's sovereignty and development.

In 1981, a portrait documentary about Matteus was completed, offering insights into his life and work. However, the film faced censorship by the minister of culture at the time, resulting in its public ban. It could only be screened with special permission from the authorities. It wasn't until Estonia regained its independence that the documentary was made accessible to the public. In 2007, the film was digitally remastered, allowing audiences to finally appreciate Matteus's legacy and contributions to Estonian architecture.

== Works ==
- Tamme Stadium (1928)
- Oskar Luts Home Museum
- Ugala konvendihoone (Estonian:)

Ugala convent house (1939)
