= Pikareinu =

Village in Estonia

Coordinates: 58°06′N 26°40′E

- Village
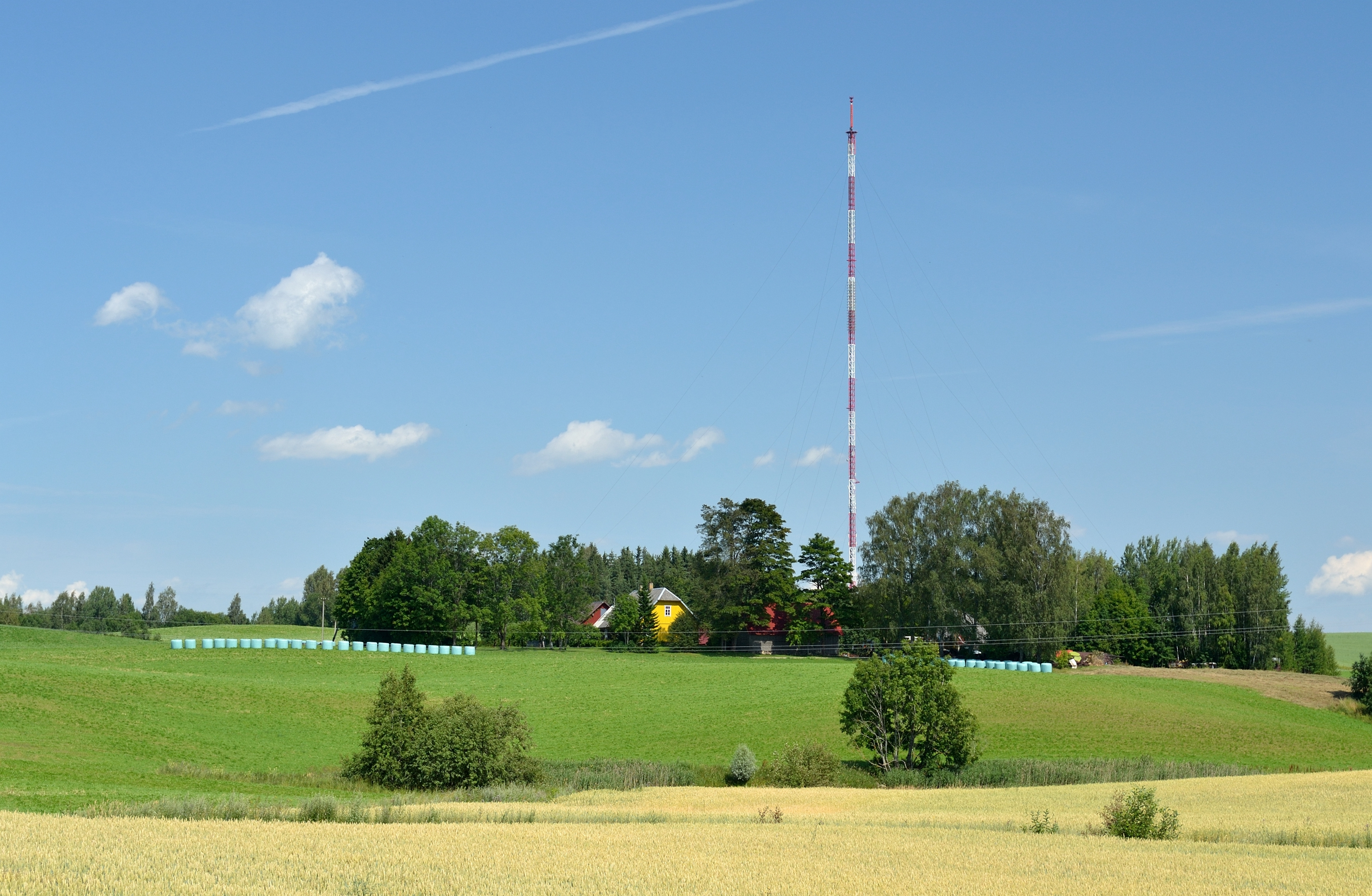
- The Valgjärve TV Mast in Pikareinu
- Interactive map of Pikareinu
- Country: Estonia
- County: Põlva County
- Parish: Kanepi Parish
- Time zone: UTC+2 (EET)
  - Summer (DST): UTC+3 (EEST)

Pikareinu is a village in Kanepi Parish, Põlva County in southeastern Estonia.

The second-tallest structure in Estonia (and the highest structure measured from sea level), the Valgjärve TV Mast, is located in Pikareinu. The poet and writer Elise Aun (1863–1932) was born in Pikareinu.
