= Sõrve Lighthouse =

Lighthouse in Estonia

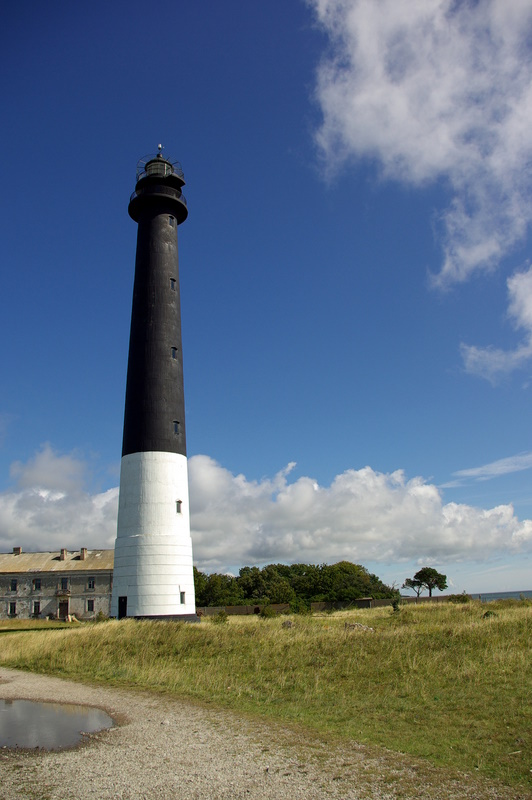
- Location: Saaremaa Parish, Saaremaa, Estonia
- Coordinates: 57°54′35″N 22°03′19″E

Tower
- Constructed: 1646 (first); 1770 (second)
- Construction: concrete
- Height: 52 metres (171 ft)
- Shape: cylindrical tower with double balcony and lantern
- Markings: black tower with a horizontal wide white lower band

Light
- First lit: 1960 (current)
- Focal height: 53 metres (174 ft)
- Range: 15 nautical miles (28 km; 17 mi)
- Characteristic: FFl W 15 s.
- Estonia no.: EVA 935

Sõrve Lighthouse (Estonian: Sõrve tuletorn) is a lighthouse located in Saaremaa Parish, on the island of Saaremaa, in Estonia. The current lighthouse is a cylindrical concrete tower, which was built to replace a temporary wooden structure lighthouse that served as a signal point between 1945 and 1960.

== History ==
The first lighthouse on the Sõrve Peninsula was built in 1646. The original structure of the lighthouse was wooden; however, the structure was replaced with stone in 1650, and designed by Heinrich Stegeling. The lighthouse was under private possession until 1737, when it was managed by the state. The rectangular structure of the lighthouse was reconstructed in 1770, and built higher in 1807. Another reconstruction occurred in 1863, when the lighthouse (at a height of 35 metres) was fitted with catoptric apparatus. The lighthouse had survived World War I, however its wooden interior was damaged by fire. During World War II, the whole structure was destroyed in the year of 1944. The temporary wooden octagonal structure was built in 1949, and was used up until 1960, when it was replaced by the current reinforced concrete lighthouse.

== See also ==
- List of lighthouses in Estonia
