= OMX Nordic 40 =

Stock market index

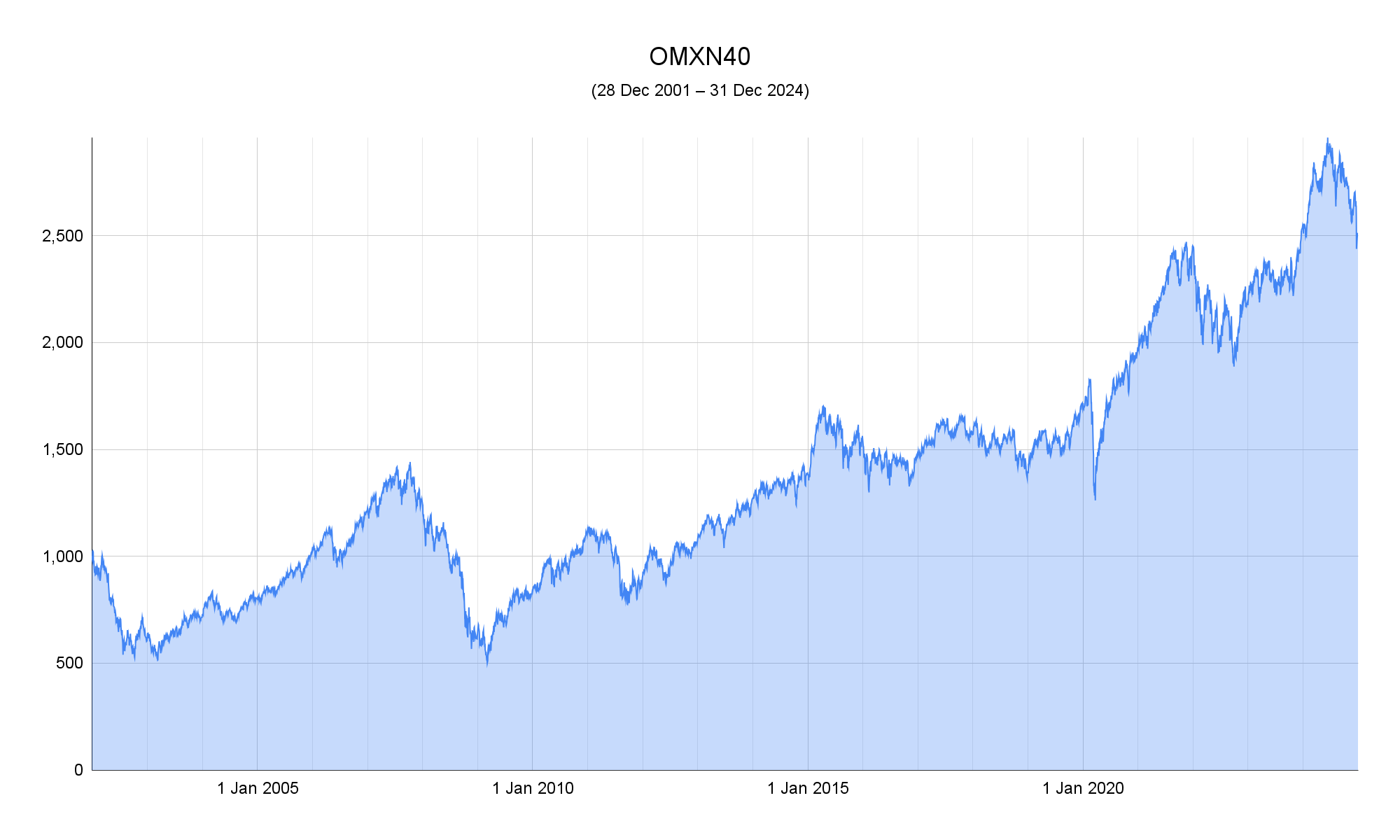
- OMXN40 index performance between 2002 and 2024
- Foundation: 2 October 2006
- Operator: Nasdaq, Inc.
- Exchanges: Nasdaq Stockholm; Nasdaq Copenhagen; Nasdaq Helsinki; Nasdaq Iceland
- Constituents: 40
- Type: Large cap
- Weighting method: Capitalization-weighted
- Website: Official website
- ISIN: SE0001809476
- Reuters: .OMXN40

The OMX Nordic 40 (OMXN40) is a stock market index for the pan-regional (virtual) Nasdaq Nordic. It is a price return and capitalization-weighted index. The base date for the index is 28 December 2001, with a base value of 1000.

The OMX Nordic 40 was launched on 2 October 2006 and consists of the 40 largest and most traded stocks from the four stock exchanges operated by Nasdaq Nordic: Nasdaq Stockholm, Nasdaq Copenhagen, Nasdaq Helsinki and Nasdaq Iceland (although no Icelandic companies are currently included). The free float market capitalization and turnover of the securities are calculated in Euro. The index is reconstituted and rebalanced semi-annually in June and December.

== Components ==
As of July 2025, the index is composed of the following 40 listings.

Company	Symbol	GICS sector	Stock exchange
A.P. Møller Maersk B	MAERSK B	Industrials	(Denmark) Nasdaq Copenhagen
ABB Ltd	ABB	Industrials	(Sweden) Nasdaq Stockholm
Alfa Laval	ALFA	Industrials	(Sweden) Nasdaq Stockholm
Assa Abloy B	ASSA B	Industrials	(Sweden) Nasdaq Stockholm
AstraZeneca	AZN	Health Care	(Sweden) Nasdaq Stockholm
Atlas Copco A	ATCO A	Industrials	(Sweden) Nasdaq Stockholm
Atlas Copco B	ATCO B	Industrials	(Sweden) Nasdaq Stockholm
Boliden	BOL	Materials	(Sweden) Nasdaq Stockholm
Carlsberg B	CARL B	Consumer Staples	(Denmark) Nasdaq Copenhagen
Coloplast B	COLO B	Health Care	(Denmark) Nasdaq Copenhagen
Danske Bank	DANSKE	Financials	(Denmark) Nasdaq Copenhagen
DSV	DSV	Industrials	(Denmark) Nasdaq Copenhagen
EQT	EQT	Financials	(Sweden) Nasdaq Stockholm
Ericsson B	ERIC B	Information Technology	(Sweden) Nasdaq Stockholm
Essity B	ESSITY B	Consumer Staples	(Sweden) Nasdaq Stockholm
Evolution	EVO	Consumer Discretionary	(Sweden) Nasdaq Stockholm
Genmab	GMAB	Health Care	(Denmark) Nasdaq Copenhagen
Handelsbanken A	SHB A	Financials	(Sweden) Nasdaq Stockholm
Hennes & Mauritz B	HM B	Consumer Discretionary	(Sweden) Nasdaq Stockholm
Hexagon B	HEXA B	Information Technology	(Sweden) Nasdaq Stockholm
Investor B	INVE B	Financials	(Sweden) Nasdaq Stockholm
KONE	KNEBV	Industrials	(Finland) Nasdaq Helsinki
Nibe Industrier B	NIBE B	Industrials	(Sweden) Nasdaq Stockholm
Nokia	NOKIA	Information Technology	(Finland) Nasdaq Helsinki
Nordea	NDA FI	Financials	(Finland) Nasdaq Helsinki
Novo Nordisk B	NOVO B	Health Care	(Denmark) Nasdaq Copenhagen
Novonesis (Novozymes) B	NSIS B	Health Care	(Denmark) Nasdaq Copenhagen
Ørsted	ORSTED	Utilities	(Denmark) Nasdaq Copenhagen
Pandora	PNDORA	Consumer Discretionary	(Denmark) Nasdaq Copenhagen
Saab B	SAAB B	Industrials	(Sweden) Nasdaq Stockholm
Sampo A	SAMPO	Financials	(Finland) Nasdaq Helsinki
Sandvik	SAND	Industrials	(Sweden) Nasdaq Stockholm
SCA B	SCA B	Materials	(Sweden) Nasdaq Stockholm
SEB A	SEB A	Financials	(Sweden) Nasdaq Stockholm
Swedbank A	SWED A	Financials	(Sweden) Nasdaq Stockholm
Tele2 B	TEL2 B	Communication Services	(Sweden) Nasdaq Stockholm
Telia Company	TELIA	Communication Services	(Sweden) Nasdaq Stockholm
UPM-Kymmene	UPM	Materials	(Finland) Nasdaq Helsinki
Vestas Wind Systems	VWS	Industrials	(Denmark) Nasdaq Copenhagen
Volvo B	VOLV B	Industrials	(Sweden) Nasdaq Stockholm
