= Auga (disambiguation) =

Auga is a commune in south west France.

Auga may also refer to:

- Auga Group, a Lithuanian food company
- Auga Punta, an archaeological site in Peru
- Ukaan language, an African language also known as Auga

== People with the name ==
- Ulrike Auga (born 1964), German theologian
