= FUTOP =

FUTOP Clearing Center A/S, is the screen-traded, Danish derivatives market that merged with the Copenhagen Stock Exchange in 1997, becoming a wholly owned subsidiary of the exchange. In 2003 CSE merged with the OMX exchanges. FUTOP issues, clears, and guarantees futures and options on shares, indices, and interest rate products. FUTOP products can be traded electronically. Danmarks Nationalbank handles accounts in connection with the administration of margin requirements for trades. Net positions are calculated once a day, after which amounts are exchanged via the participants' accounts with Danmarks Nationalbank. FUTOP has outsourced most of its clearing services to Stockholmsbörsen (part of OM), but not the trade guarantee. Because market participants considered risk management at FUTOP to be so closely related to the provision of trade guarantees, risk management responsibilities were retained by FUTOP along with the trade guarantee.

== See also ==
- Copenhagen Stock Exchange
- OMX
