= Vincit =

Finnish technology company

Vincit Oyj
- Company type: Julkinen osakeyhtiö
- Traded as: OMXH: VINCIT
- Industry: IT Services, IT Consulting
- Founded: 2007; 19 years ago
- Founder: Mikko Kuitunen and Olli-Pekka Virtanen
- Headquarters: Tampere, Finland
- Key people: Mikko Kuitunen (chairman); Julius Manni (CEO)
- Products: VincitEAM
- Services: Software development and design, mobile software, embedded software, web software, service design, management consulting, new technologies and data, digital platform services
- Revenue: 61.5 million euros (2021)
- Operating income: 5.1 million euros (2021)
- Total equity: 98 MEUR (2021)
- Number of employees: 850+ (1.7.2022)
- Subsidiaries: Vincit Helsinki Oy, Vincit Jyväskylä Oy, Vincit California Inc, Vincit Arizona Inc ja Vincit Solutions Oy
- Website: www.vincit.com,www.vincit.fi

Vincit Oyj (Vincit Plc) is an internationally operating digital service provider, founded and headquartered in Finland. The company's services cover the entire digital value chain from management consulting to design, software development, and software maintenance. The Group has subsidiaries in Finland and the United States. The Finnish customer-base is made up by large and medium-sized companies from several industries as well as the public sector.

A merger with Bilot, an IT-services company established in 2015, realized on January 1, 2022, saw Vincit's employee count soar to over 850.

Vincit Oyj is listed on Nasdaq First North Growth Market Finland.
