= Nasdaq =

American stock exchange

Nasdaq Stock Market

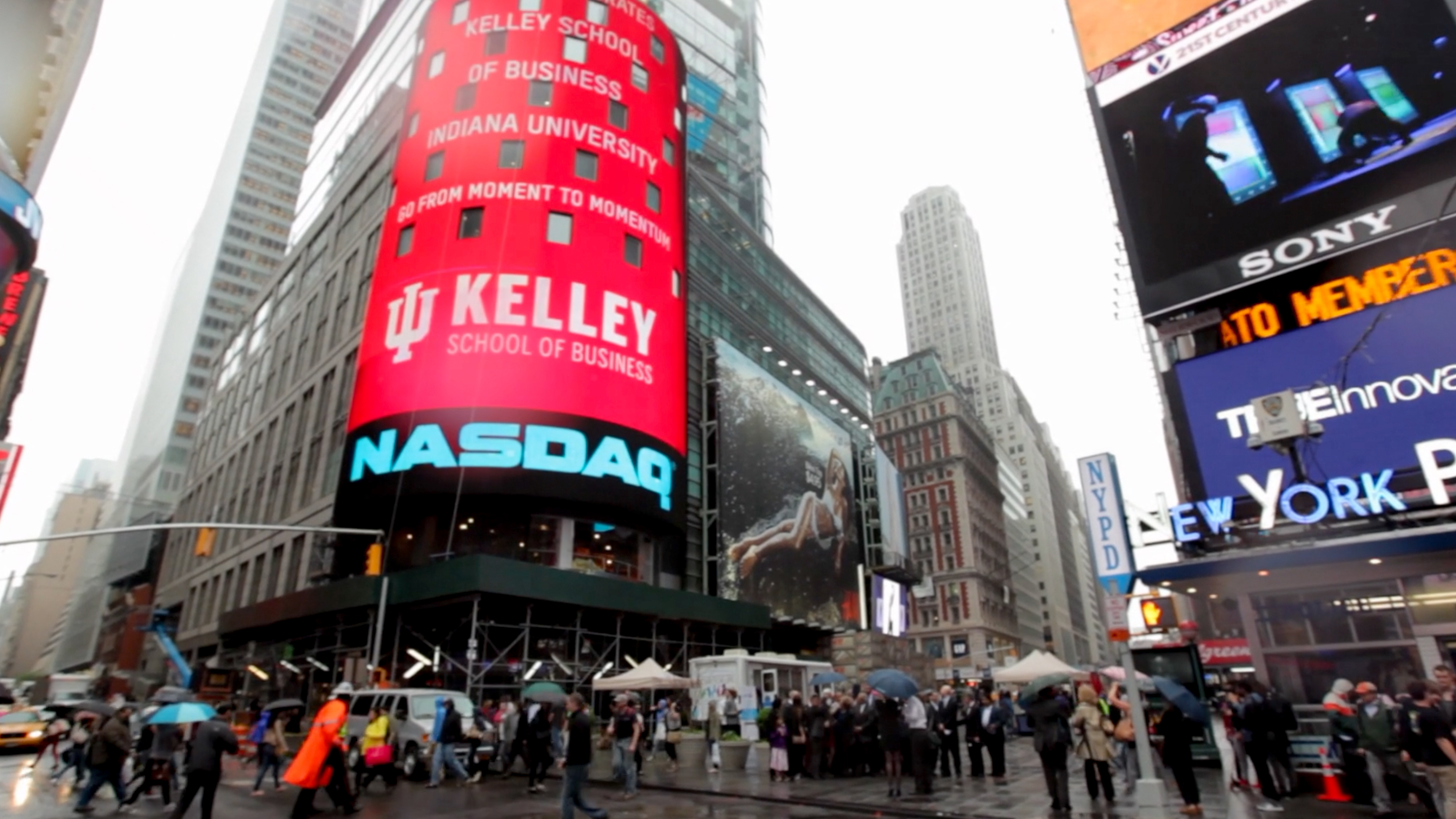
- Type: Stock exchange
- Location: New York City, U.S.
- Coordinates: 40.7565°N 73.98576°W
- Founded: February 8, 1971; 55 years ago
- Owner: Nasdaq, Inc.
- Currency: United States dollar
- No. of listings: 4,025 (January 2026)
- Market cap: $42.2 trillion (October 2026)
- Indices: Nasdaq-100; Nasdaq Financial-100; Nasdaq Composite
- Website: www.nasdaq.com

Stock exchanges (listing venues) owned by Nasdaq, Inc.

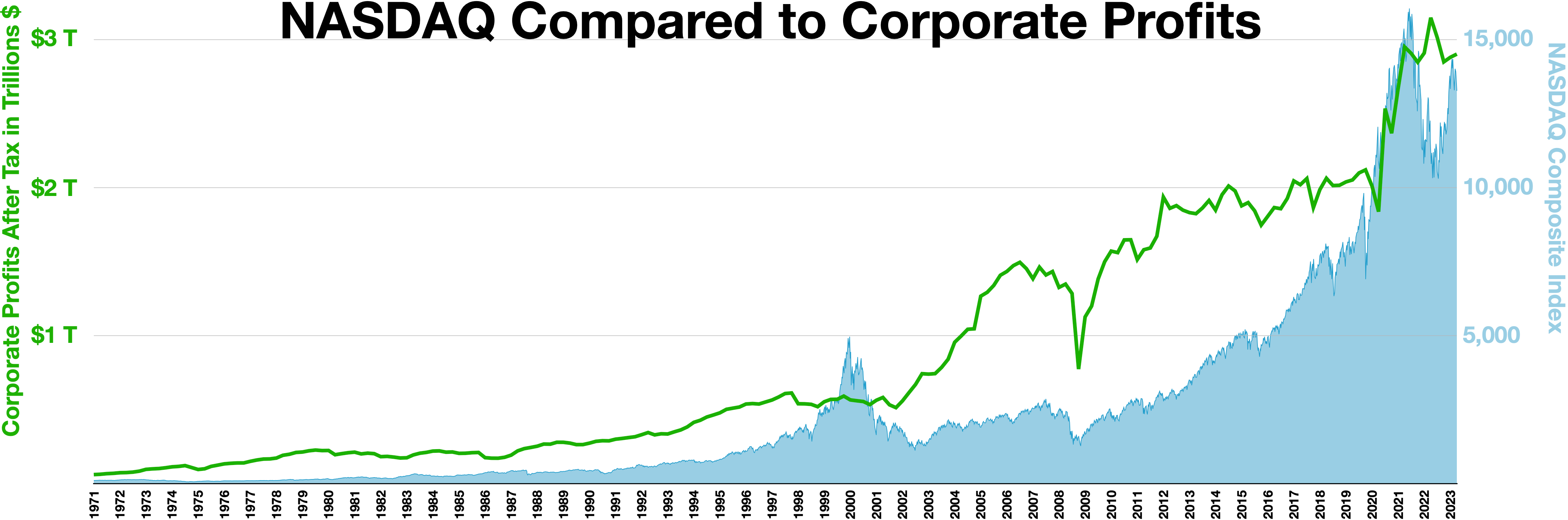
Nasdaq compared to corporate profits Corporate profits after tax NASDAQ Index

The Nasdaq Stock Market (Note: Pronounced /ˈnæzdæk/ NAZ-dak.) is an American stock exchange. It is the largest stock exchange by market capitalization and the first fully electronic stock market. Based in Manhattan, New York City, the exchange is among the most active stock trading venues by volume in the United States.

The exchange platform is owned by Nasdaq, Inc., which also owns the Nasdaq Nordic stock market network and several U.S.-based stock and options exchanges. The Nasdaq is the primary listing exchange for many technology companies and also trades stock in many foreign firms, with China and Israel being the largest foreign sources.

As of December 31, 2024, 4,075 companies listed securities on Nasdaq, including 1,383 listings on Nasdaq Global Select Market, 1,366 on Nasdaq Global Market, and 1,326 on Nasdaq Capital Market.

The Nasdaq Composite, Nasdaq-100, and Nasdaq Financial-100 stock market indices are made up only of stocks listed on the Nasdaq.

== History ==
=== 1972–2000 ===
==== Founding and origins ====
Former logo used from 1990 to 2014

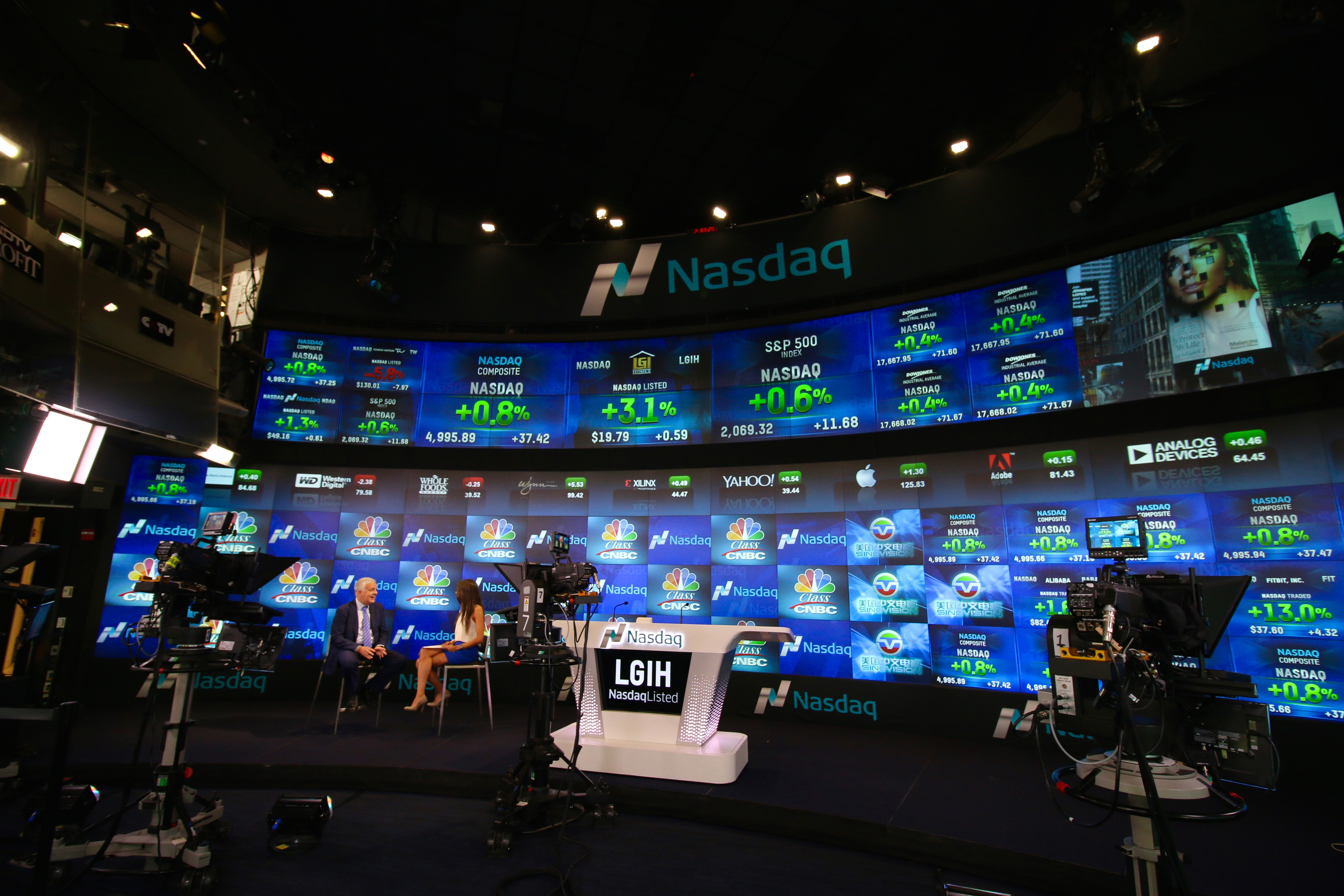
Studio

Nasdaq, Inc. was founded in 1971 by the National Association of Securities Dealers (NASD), now known as the Financial Industry Regulatory Authority (FINRA). Nasdaq did not have a physical trading floor, unlike other traditional stock exchanges, including the New York Stock Exchange (NYSE). "Nasdaq" (originally and still commonly spelled with all-capital letters as "NASDAQ") is an acronym for The "National Association of Securities Dealers Automated Quotations". On February 8, 1971, the Nasdaq Stock Market commenced operations as the world's first fully electronic stock market. Initially, Nasdaq served as a "quotation system" rather than a platform for electronic trading. Intel Corporation was one of the first major corporations to list its shares on Nasdaq; other major companies that have been listed on Nasdaq since its early years include Comcast and Applied Materials.

==== Market growth ====
Since the launch of Nasdaq, many major companies trading on the over-the-counter (OTC) market began switching to Nasdaq. As late as 1987, the Nasdaq exchange was still commonly referred to as "OTC" in media reports and also in the monthly Stock Guides issued by Standard & Poor's Corporation. Over the years, it became more of a stock market with the addition of trade and volume reporting and automated trading systems. In 1981, Nasdaq traded 37% of the U.S. securities markets' total of 21 billion shares. By 1991, Nasdaq accounted for approximately 46% of U.S. securities trading volume. In 1992, the Nasdaq Stock Market joined with the London Stock Exchange to form the first intercontinental linkage of capital markets.

In 1996, the United States Securities and Exchange Commission (SEC) issued a report alleging that Nasdaq market makers fixed prices by avoiding "odd-eighths" quotes (at the time, stock prices were quoted in increments of an eighth of a dollar) to artificially widen spreads. The report was followed by a new set of rules for how Nasdaq handled orders.

==== Online trading ====
In 1998, it became the first stock market in the United States to trade online, using the slogan "the stock market for the next hundred years". The Nasdaq Stock Market attracted many companies during the dot-com bubble.

=== 2000–2020 ===
==== Public listing and market change ====
In a series of sales in 2000 and 2001, FINRA sold its stake in the Nasdaq. On July 2, 2002, Nasdaq, Inc. became a public company via an initial public offering, listing its own shares on the exchange (traded under the ticker symbol NDAQ). In 2006, the status of the Nasdaq Stock Market was changed from a stock market to a licensed national securities exchange. In 2007, it merged with OMX, a leading exchange operator in the Nordic countries, expanded its global footprint, and changed its name to the Nasdaq OMX Group.

To qualify for listing on the exchange, a company must be registered with the SEC, must have at least three market makers (financial firms that act as brokers or dealers for specific securities) and must meet minimum requirements for assets, capital, public shares, and shareholders.

In 2011, after an announced merger of NYSE Euronext with Deutsche Börse, Nasdaq partnered with Intercontinental Exchange to launch a rival bid, but the bid was withdrawn on regulatory concerns.

==== Acquisitions ====
In December 2005, Nasdaq acquired Instinet for $1.9 billion, retaining the Inet ECN and subsequently selling the agency brokerage business to Silver Lake Partners and Instinet management.

The European Association of Securities Dealers Automatic Quotation System (EASDAQ) was founded as a European equivalent to the Nasdaq Stock Market. It was purchased by Nasdaq in 2001 and became Nasdaq Europe. In 2003, operations were shut down as a result of the burst of the dot-com bubble. In 2007, Nasdaq Europe was revived first as Equiduct and was acquired by Börse Berlin later that year.

On November 7, 2007, Nasdaq acquired the Philadelphia Stock Exchange, the oldest stock exchange in the U.S.

==== Sustainability and leadership milestones ====
On June 18, 2012, Nasdaq OMX became a founding member of the United Nations Sustainable Stock Exchanges Initiative on the eve of the United Nations Conference on Sustainable Development (Rio+20).

In November 2016, chief operating officer Adena Friedman was promoted to chief executive officer (CEO), becoming the first woman to serve as CEO of a major U.S. exchange.

In 2016, listings-related activities accounted for $272 million in Nasdaq's revenue.

In October 2018, the SEC blocked the NYSE and Nasdaq from raising certain market-data prices. This was the first time the commission rejected increases for the exchanges' stock market data feeds.

In December 2019, Nasdaq created the Sustainable Bond Network, an online platform to increase transparency for green, social, and sustainability bonds.

In December 2020, Nasdaq announced that it would remove shares of four Chinese companies from indexes it maintains in accordance with Executive Order 13959. This included China Communications Construction Company, China Railway Construction Corporation, Semiconductor Manufacturing International Corporation, and CRRC.

=== 2021-present ===
In February 2021, Nasdaq and Hashdex launched the Nasdaq Crypto Index (NCI), a benchmark designed to track the cryptocurrency market and serve as the basis for index-based investment products.

In June 2021, Nasdaq took a majority stake in carbon-removal marketplace Puro.earth, expanding its role in voluntary carbon removal markets.

In 2022, Nasdaq acquired ESG reporting platform Metrio and later reported that its greenhouse gas reduction targets were validated by the Science Based Targets initiative.

In 2023, The Nasdaq-100 index experienced a massive historic turnaround, surging over 50% on a total daily return basis to mark its best performance since 2009, driven by high-growth tech stocks and advancements in artificial intelligence.This followed a sharp 2022 decline, with large-cap growth significantly outperforming value as the index benefited from a rally in major technology companies.

In September 2024, the European Commission said it had carried out an unannounced inspection at the offices of Nasdaq over potential anti-competitive practices.

In October 2024, Nasdaq announced updates to its Calypso platform, including the introduction of XVA Accelerator, a tool for portfolio risk calculations.

In March 2025, pending approval by the SEC, Nasdaq announced plans to introduce 24-hour 5-day a week trading on its United States exchange during the second half of 2026 in response to increased global demand for U.S. equities.

In May 2025, Nasdaq and Amazon Web Services (AWS) announced the launch of Nasdaq Eqlipse Trading, a cloud-based platform. Exchanges that have adopted the platform include Johannesburg Stock Exchange (JSE Limited), Mexico's Grupo BMV, and the Philippine Stock Exchange.

On 18 March 2026, the SEC approved a Nasdaq proposal to allow certain stocks to be traded and settled in tokenized form. This marked a step toward integrating blockchain-based settlements into mainstream equity markets.

== Quote availability ==
A quote is the price of a stock as listed on an exchange. Quotes consist of bids, the price buyers are willing to pay, and offers, the price sellers will accept. Nasdaq quotes are available at three levels:

- Level 1 shows the highest bid and lowest ask—inside quote.
- Level 2 shows all public quotes of market makers together with information of market dealers wishing to buy or sell stock and recently executed orders.
- Level 3 is used by the market makers and allows them to enter their quotes and execute orders.

== Trading schedule ==
Nasdaq sessions in Eastern Time Zone are:

4:00 a.m. to 9:30 a.m.: extended-hours trading session (premarket)

9:30 a.m. to 4:00 p.m.: normal trading session

4:00 p.m. to 8:00 p.m.: extended-hours trading session (postmarket)

The Nasdaq Stock Market averages about 253 trading days per year.

== Market tiers ==
Within the Nasdaq Composite Index, the Nasdaq exchange has three different market tiers for listed companies:

- Capital Market (NASDAQ-CM small cap) is an equity market for companies that have relatively small levels of market capitalization. Listing requirements for such "small cap" companies are less stringent than for other Nasdaq markets that list larger companies with significantly higher market capitalization.
- Global Market (NASDAQ-GM mid cap) is made up of stocks that represent the Nasdaq Global Market. The Global Market consists of 1,450 stocks that meet Nasdaq's strict financial and liquidity requirements, and corporate governance standards. The Global Market is less exclusive than the Global Select Market.
- Global Select Market (NASDAQ-GS large cap) is a market capitalization-weighted index made up of US-based and international stocks that represent the Nasdaq Global Select Market Composite (NQGS). This includes companies with the largest market capitalization within the Nasdaq Composite. The Global Select Market consists of 1,200 stocks that meet Nasdaq's strict financial and liquidity requirements and corporate governance standards. The Global Select Market is more exclusive than the Global Market. Every October, the Nasdaq Listing Qualifications Department reviews the Global Market Composite to determine if any of its stocks have become eligible for listing on the Global Select Market.

== Difference between NYSE and Nasdaq ==
Bunker-Ramo Data Center in 1971

Nasdaq is the second largest stock exchange in the United States. In addition to age and market capitalization, there are other key differences between the two exchanges:

- Trading Volume. Nasdaq has a greater trading volume than the NYSE with approximately 1.8 billion trades per day.
- Exchange systems. Before the COVID-19 pandemic, the NYSE maintained both an electronic trading system and a trading floor system staffed by live professionals who help conduct auctions. Nasdaq has been an all-electronic exchange since its inception.
- Market structure. The NYSE traces its origins to the Buttonwood Agreement of 1792, when brokers met in person to trade securities using open outcry. Nasdaq began in 1971 as the first exclusively electronic quotation system for OTC securities, displaying bid and ask prices from competing market makers on cathode-ray terminals; however, trades were still executed by telephone until electronic execution was introduced in 1984. In 2002–2003, Nasdaq launched Supermontage, integrating a public limit order book with market maker quotations and allowing any participant to post orders. The NYSE adopted a similar electronic central limit order book system in 2006, which today handles the majority of their trading volume; however, the NYSE retains its physical trading floor where designated market makers facilitate opening, closing, and reopening auctions and are obligated to provide liquidity for the public (institutional investors, hedge funds, broker/dealers) during periods of volatility.
- Listing fees. Listing fees on the Nasdaq vary based on market. For the Capital Market, the fee range is $53,000-$86,000; the Global and Global Select Markets range is $56,000-$193,000; and there is an $81,000-$85,000 listing fee for acquisition companies.
- Sectors. Investors typically view the NYSE as an exchange for older, more established companies. Nasdaq tends to be home to newer companies focused on technology and innovation.

== See also ==
- ACT (NASDAQ)
- Advanced Computerized Execution System
- Directors Desk
- Economy of New York City
- List of stock exchange mergers in the Americas
- List of stock exchanges in the Americas
- NASDAQ futures
- Supermontage (SM) integrated trading system
- United States corporate law
- CCP Global
