= Apranga Group =

Lithuanian clothing retail chain

- Type: Public
- Traded as: Nasdaq Baltic: APG1L
- Industry: Clothing retail
- Founded: 1 March 1993
- Headquarters: Vilnius
- Area served: Lithuania, Latvia and Estonia
- Key people: Rimantas Perveneckas, director-general; Darius Mockus, chairman
- Revenue: ▲€269,7 million (2023)
- Owner: MG grupė, UAB
- Number of employees: 808 (August, 2024)
- Website: aprangagroup.lt/en

Apranga Group is a clothing retail chain in Lithuania and the Baltic states. Apranga group consists of the main company APB "Apranga" and 18 subsidiary companies. Aprangas Group manages a network of 166 stores in the Baltic countries.

It runs stores under various brands, often under franchise agreements, including:

- Zara, Pull and Bear, and Bershka
- Mango, Stradivarius.
- Hugo Boss, Emporio Armani, and other luxury brands.

Apranga is listed on the NASDAQ OMX Vilnius Stock Exchange and is owned by MG Baltic. In 2007, Euromoney ranked it 1st in Lithuania among "Emerging Europe's Best Managed Companies" In 2009, Apranga made a net loss of 17 m LTL on retail turnover of 393 m LTL. As of 2014, Apranga owned 152 stores, of which 94 were in Lithuania, 43 in Latvia and 15 in Estonia. As of April 1, 2014, the sales area was 70,400 square meters.

Apranga has 192 stores around the Baltic States.
