= Robert Greifeld =

American businessman and author

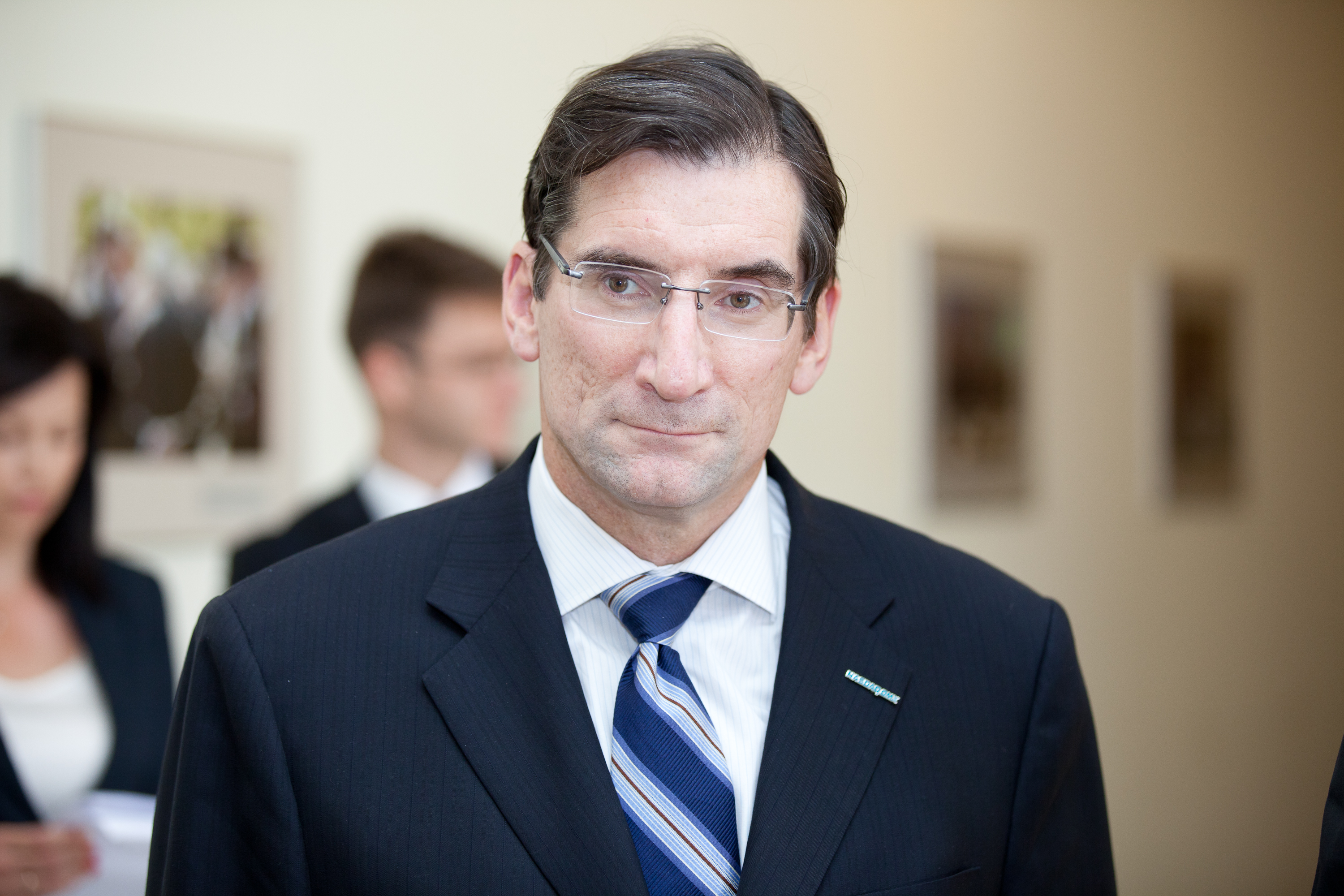
- Born: 1957 (age 68–69)
- Education: Iona College; New York University
- Occupation: Businessman
- Known for: Chairman and CEO of Nasdaq, Inc.

Robert Greifeld (born 1957) is an American businessman and author. He is the former CEO and chairman of Nasdaq and former chairman of Virtu Financial.

== Early life ==
Greifeld was born in Queens, New York, to an Italian American mother and a father of Irish and German descent. He holds a master's degree in business from the New York University Stern School of Business, and a B.A. in English from Iona College.

== Career ==
In the 1980s, Greifeld was a district manager for Unisys in Jericho, NY. In 1991 he joined Automated Securities Clearance, Inc. (ACS), becoming president of the company in 1993. While at ACS he spearheaded the creation of BRASS, one of the first electronic stock order matching systems, and Brut, an electronic communication network (ECN).

After SunGard Data Systems acquired ACS in 1999, Greifeld was promoted to group CEO of SunGard Brokerage Systems.

In 2003, Greifeld succeeded Hardwick Simmons as chairman and CEO of Nasdaq. Under Greifeld, in 2007 Nasdaq attempted a hostile takeover of the London Stock Exchange, but their offer was ultimately rejected by shareholders. In 2011, Nasdaq OMX collaborated with IntercontinentalExchange to attempt a hostile takeover of NYSE Euronext, however their bid was withdrawn due to antitrust concerns.

In 2016, Nasdaq announced that Greifeld would be succeeded as CEO by Adena Friedman as of January 2017. He continued in the role of chairman until May 2017, at which time he became the chairman of Virtu Financial.

In 2019, Greifeld authored the book "Market Mover: Lessons from a Decade of Change at Nasdaq", chronicling his time at Nasdaq.

Greifeld left Virtu in April 2023 to work on launching a tech-focused investment fund, Cornerstone FTM, among other endeavors.

== Personal life ==
Greifeld has resided with his wife and family in Westfield, New Jersey In 2016, he gave the commencement address at Iona College.
