= Nasdaq, Inc. =

American multinational financial services corporation

- Logo used since 2018

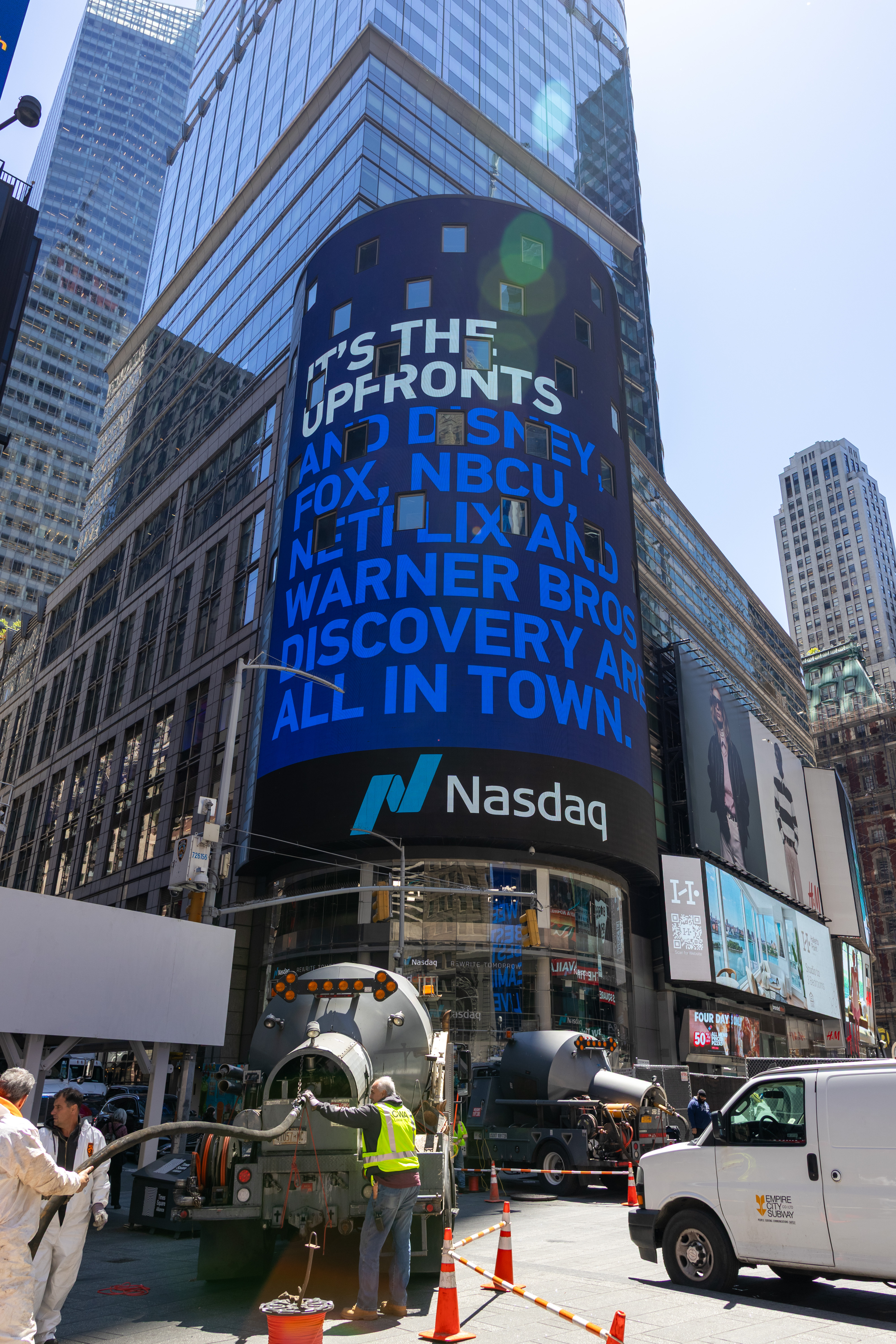
- Nasdaq MarketSite in New York City
- Formerly: The NASDAQ Stock Market, Inc. (1971–2008); The NASDAQ OMX Group, Inc. (2008–2014)
- Type: Public
- Traded as: Nasdaq: NDAQ; S&P 500 component
- Industry: Financial services
- Founded: February 8, 1971; 55 years ago
- Headquarters: One Liberty Plaza, New York City, United States
- Area served: United States, Europe, APAC, Latin America
- Key people: Adena Friedman (chair and CEO)
- Products: Stock trading; Derivatives; Equity trading platforms; Futures and Options; Market data; Securities exchanges; Financial technology and related services
- Revenue: ▲US$8.26 billion (2025)
- Net income: ▲US$1.79 billion (2025)
- Total assets: ▲US$31.1 billion (2025)
- Total equity: ▲US$12.2 billion (2025)
- Number of employees: 9,162 (2024)
- Subsidiaries: International Securities Exchange; Nasdaq; Nasdaq Nordic; Adenza; Verafin
- Website: nasdaq.com

Nasdaq, Inc. (/ˈnæzdæk/ NAZ-dak) is an American multinational financial services corporation providing data, analytics, software, exchange capabilities, and advisory services to corporate clients, investment managers, banks, brokers, and exchange operators across the global financial system. Nasdaq was founded in 1971 as the world's first electronic stock market, and became publicly traded in 2000. It is headquartered in New York City, and its chair and chief executive officer is Adena Friedman.

The company owns and operates three stock exchanges in the United States: the Nasdaq Stock Exchange (on which it is also listed), the Philadelphia Stock Exchange, and the Boston Stock Exchange, as well as seven European stock exchanges: Nasdaq Copenhagen, Nasdaq Helsinki, Nasdaq Iceland, Nasdaq Riga, Nasdaq Stockholm, Nasdaq Tallinn, and Nasdaq Vilnius.

The European operations originated from OMX AB (Aktiebolaget Optionsmäklarna/Helsinki Stock Exchange), which was formed in 2003 through a merger between Sweden's OM AB and Finland's HEX plc. The operations have been part of Nasdaq, Inc. (formerly known as Nasdaq OMX Group) since February 2008. They are now known as Nasdaq Nordic, which provides financial services and operates marketplaces for securities in the Nordic and Baltic regions of Europe.

== History ==
=== 1971–1980: Founding and early acquisitions ===
The Nasdaq was established in 1971 by the National Association of Securities Dealers (NASD), now known as the Financial Industry Regulatory Authority (FINRA), as the world's first electronic stock market. Initially, Nasdaq operated as a quotation system for over-the-counter (OTC) securities, providing electronic bid and ask prices to increase transparency among market participants. Over time, Nasdaq expanded its functions to enable actual trading, eventually becoming a full stock exchange. This transition marked a shift in how securities were traded, focusing on speed, automation, and accessibility.

In 1992, Nasdaq entered a partnership with the London-based International Stock Exchange, establishing the first intercontinental linkage of securities markets. In 1998 a merger happened with the American Stock Exchange (AMEX), forming Nasdaq-Amex Market Group.

=== 1980–2008: European stock exchanges merged in OMX AB ===
OM AB (Optionsmäklarna) was a futures exchange founded by Olof Stenhammar in the 1980s to introduce trading in standardized option contracts in Sweden. OM acquired the Stockholm Stock Exchange in 1998 and unsuccessfully attempted acquisition of the London Stock Exchange in 2001. During the dot-com bubble in the early 21st century, OM, together with investment bank Morgan Stanley Dean Witter, launched a virtual European stock exchange called Jiway. The project was not successful and was canceled on October 14, 2002.

On September 3, 2003, the Helsinki Stock Exchange (HEX) merged with OM, and the joint company became OMHEX. On August 31, 2004, the brand name of the company was changed to OMX. OMX then acquired the Copenhagen Stock Exchange in January 2005 for €164 million. On September 19, 2006, the Iceland Stock Exchange owner Eignarhaldsfelagid Verdbrefathing (EV) announced it would be acquired by OMX in a deal valuing the company at 250 million SEK. The transaction was completed by the end of the year.

The company took a 10% stake in Oslo Børs Holding ASA, the owner of the Oslo Stock Exchange in October 2006. As of September 2016, Nasdaq is not a major shareholder in the Oslo Stock Exchange holding company, which following a merger is currently called Oslo Børs VPS Holding ASA. Nasdaq has, however, publicly stated its interest in eventually acquiring the Oslo Stock Exchange.

In November 2007, OMX acquired the Armenian Stock Exchange and the Central Depository of Armenia. Nasdaq sold the exchange and the depository in 2018 to the Central Bank of Armenia.

In December 2005, OMX started First North, an alternative exchange for smaller companies, in Denmark. The First North exchange expanded to Stockholm in June 2006, Iceland in January 2007 and Helsinki in April 2007. The Markets Technology division of Computershare was acquired in 2006. The acquisition greatly expanded its product offerings and made its client list the largest of all trading system technology providers.

On October 2, 2006, the group launched a virtual Nordic Stock Exchange after merging the individual lists of shares traded at its three wholly owned Nordic exchanges into a combined Nordic List. Companies listed on the Iceland Stock Exchange have also since been merged into the list. OMX also launched a pan-regional benchmark index known as the OMX Nordic 40 on the same date; however, the individual exchanges have also retained their own national benchmark indices.

=== 2007: Creation of Nasdaq OMX Group ===
Former logo used from 1971 to 2014, with Nasdaq logo added in 2007. "OMX" was omitted from the corporate name and logo in 2015.

On May 25, 2007, NASDAQ agreed to buy OMX for US$3.7 billion. In August, however, Borse Dubai offered US$4 billion, prompting speculation of a bidding war. On September 20, 2007, Borse Dubai agreed to stop competing to buy OMX in return for a 20% stake and 5 percent of votes in NASDAQ as well as NASDAQ's then 28% stake in the London Stock Exchange. In a complex transaction, Borse Dubai acquired 97.2% of OMX's outstanding shares before selling them on to NASDAQ. The newly merged company was renamed the NASDAQ OMX Group upon completion of the deal on February 27, 2008.

On June 18, 2012, NASDAQ became a founding member of the United Nations Sustainable Stock Exchanges initiative on the eve of the United Nations Conference on Sustainable Development (Rio+20).

== Acquisitions and bids ==
=== 2006–2007: Attempted acquisition of the London Stock Exchange ===
In December 2005, the London Stock Exchange Group (LSE) rejected a £1.6 billion takeover offer from Macquarie Bank. The LSE described the offer as "derisory". It then received a bid in March 2006 for £2.4 billion from NASDAQ, which was also rejected by the LSE. NASDAQ later pulled its bid, and less than two weeks later on April 11, 2006, struck a deal with LSE's largest shareholder, Ameriprise Financial's Threadneedle Asset Management unit, to acquire all of that firm's stake, consisting of 35.4 million shares, at £11.75 per share. NASDAQ also purchased 2.69 million additional shares, resulting in a total stake of 15%. While the seller of those shares was undisclosed, it occurred simultaneously with a sale by Scottish Widows of 2.69 million shares. The move was seen as an effort to force LSE to negotiate either a partnership or eventual merger, as well as to block other suitors such as NYSE Euronext, owner of the New York Stock Exchange.

Subsequent purchases increased NASDAQ's stake to 29%, holding off competing bids for several months. However, only a further 0.4% of shareholders accepted the offer by the deadline and therefore the offer was rejected on February 10, 2007.

=== 2007: Acquisition of the Boston and Philadelphia exchanges ===
On October 2, 2007, Nasdaq purchased the Boston Stock Exchange. On November 7, Nasdaq announced an agreement to purchase the Philadelphia Stock Exchange.

=== 2012: Acquisition of Thomson Reuters businesses ===
On December 12, 2012, NASDAQ OMX announced that it would acquire parts of Thomson Reuters for $390 million in cash. This deal included its investor relations, public relations and multimedia businesses. NASDAQ OMX completed the purchase on June 3, 2013.

=== 2017: Acquisition of eVestment ===
In September 2017, Nasdaq agreed to acquire eVestment, a privately held company, for $705 million in debt and cash on hand. This was the first major acquisition under the leadership of Adena Friedman, Nasdaq's current CEO. The acquisition was completed in Q4 of 2017 and signaled the beginning o Nasdaq's evolution into a leading SaaS technology provider.

=== 2018: Bid for Oslo Stock Exchange ===
During Christmas of 2018, shareholders representing 25% of Oslo Børs VPS Holding (the Norwegian Stock Exchange and national CSD operator) held a private auction of share sale. Nasdaq did not participate in the auction due to the hostile nature of the bid (held without Oslo Børs boards knowledge or approval). Euronext won the auction, and later secured another 24.6% of shareholder support, totaling 49.6%. Following this, Nasdaq acquired 32.5% shares in open market (mainly from individual shareholders/employees), and submitted an official bid, with unanimous recommendations from board and some key shareholders, to acquire remaining shares for 152 NOK, and later increased offer to 158 NOK (or almost 44% premium of December 17, 2018 closing price, to match Euronext offer), additionally making the case to Norway's markets regulator that in cases like this, 2/3 of the share control may be necessary to comply with any applicable regulatory requirement. In the end the regulator did not side with the two-thirds requirements, and general majority was deemed to be applicable. Euronext by that time had acquired or secured control of 50.5% shares, and Nasdaq had announced on May 25, 2019, that they were pulling out of the Oslo Børs battle, handing Euronext the victory.

=== 2020: Acquisition of Verafin ===
On November 19, 2020, Nasdaq announced that they would acquire Verafin for US$2.75 billion in cash. This acquisition was meant to combine Nasdaq’s global reach and leadership in the regulatory technology space with Verafin’s innovative anti-money laundering and fraud platform. The acquisition was completed on February 11, 2021.

=== 2023: Acquisition of Adenza ===
In June 2023, Nasdaq announced that it had agreed to acquire Adenza from Thoma Bravo in a $10.5 billion cash-and-stock deal, the biggest for the US exchange operator to date. As part of the deal, Thoma Bravo would get a 15 percent stake in Nasdaq.

== Additional services ==
NASDAQ Inc. partners with stock exchanges all over the world. One of the most recent partnerships was signed with Astana International Financial Centre (AIFC) in May 2017. According to the agreement, NASDAQ will power Kazakhstan's nascent stock exchange, the AIX (Astana International Exchange).

=== Global Information Services ===
In January 2013, NASDAQ OMX announced that it would combine its global data products and index businesses into a unit called Global Information Services, as part of an ongoing effort to broaden its portfolio.

=== Directors Desk ===
On June 29, 2007, NASDAQ entered into an agreement to acquire DirectorsDesk.com, a management suite for boards of directors.

=== GlobeNewswire ===
GlobeNewswire (previously PrimeNewswire) provides press release, editing and wire services. It was founded in 1998 and acquired by NASDAQ OMX in 2006. It was sold to Intrado in April 2018.

=== SMARTS ===
On July 27, 2010, NASDAQ OMX Group, Inc. acquired SMARTS Group, a provider of market surveillance systems to exchanges, regulators and brokers. SMARTS Group had been a private company operating in Sydney, Australia, incorporating the market analysis software of Michael James Aitken. By 2017 SMARTS remained the leading market surveillance software, and was employed by thirteen regulators on forty-five exchanges.

=== Carpenter Moore ===
NASDAQ OMX sold its stake in the Carpenter Moore D&O Insurance in 2009.

=== Nasdaq Entrepreneurial Center ===
Established in 2014, the Nasdaq Entrepreneurial Center is an independent nonprofit organization dedicated to educating and supporting entrepreneurs worldwide. It is an independent charity focused on educating the public about entrepreneurship and providing individual entrepreneurs with resources beneficial to both them and their communities, with a particular emphasis on improving inclusion and access for groups underrepresented in entrepreneurial endeavors.

Funded through the Nasdaq Educational Foundation, the Center serves as a central hub for entrepreneurs from all industries, offering free educational and training resources, hands-on mentorship programs, and entrepreneurial events developed in partnership with Nasdaq and leading academic institutions, companies, and business leaders. Its facilities include a broadcast studio, training areas for educational forums and classes, and collaborative spaces designed to encourage entrepreneurs to connect and exchange ideas.

To date, the Center has empowered over 125,000 global entrepreneurs by providing free resources, expert guidance, and mentorship, including many impact-driven founders who have collectively raised hundreds of millions in external capital. The organization is led by Nicola Corzine, its Founding Executive Director.

=== Nasdaq Ventures ===
In April 2017, Nasdaq launched Nasdaq Ventures, a venture investment program focused on companies that will help Nasdaq grow its product lines and open new market segments. The first 3 companies announced as part of the program are Chain, a blockchain technology company; Digital Reasoning, cognitive computing technology; and Hanweck, real-time risk analytics.

== Exchanges ==
Stock exchanges (listing venues) owned by Nasdaq, Inc.

The following exchanges are operated by Nasdaq, Inc.:

- Nasdaq (New York)
- Nasdaq Copenhagen
- Nasdaq Stockholm
- Nasdaq Helsinki
- Nasdaq Iceland
- Nasdaq Tallinn
- Nasdaq Riga
- Nasdaq Vilnius
- Nasdaq Philadelphia
- Nasdaq Boston

=== Divisions ===
The company's stock market activities are categorized into three divisions:

- Nordic Market (Copenhagen, Stockholm, Helsinki, Iceland)
- Baltic Market (Tallinn, Riga, Vilnius)
- First North (alternative exchange)

== Technology ==
In North America, OMX supports its most high-profile customers such as the Financial Industry Regulatory Authority (FINRA), ICAP, ISE, and IDCG, which are powered by OMX trading systems such as X-stream, CLICK, CONDICO and SAXESS.

OMX is the world's leading provider of central securities depository (CSD) technology. Its Equator CSD product is used by clients in Europe, the Middle East, Africa and the Caribbean.

Central counterparty clearing (CCC) technology is a significant potential growth area for OMX. OMX's SECUR clearing and Genium trading platform facilitate trade novation, derivatives clearing, risk management and improved liquidity. SECUR clearing and Genium trading technology are in production around the world.

OMX's technology customers include:

- Abu Dhabi Securities Exchange
- Agora-X
- Athens Exchange
- Australian Securities Exchange
- Bahamas International Securities Exchange
- Bahrain Stock Exchange
- Barbados Stock Exchange
- Bermuda Stock Exchange
- Bolsa de Valores de Colombia
- Boston Stock Exchange
- Canadian Trading and Quotation System
- Egyptian Exchange
- Doha Securities Market
- Dubai Financial Market
- Dubai International Financial Exchange
- Financial Industry Regulatory Authority
- Hong Kong Exchanges and Clearing
- ICAP
- Icelandic Securities Depository
- Indonesia Securities Exchange
- Iraq Stock Exchange
- Istanbul Stock Exchange
- Indonesia Stock Exchange
- Jamaica Stock Exchange
- Japannext
- Malta Stock Exchange
- Moscow Interbank Currency Exchange
- National Stock Exchange of Australia
- New Zealand Exchange
- Nigerian Stock Exchange
- NSX Corporate Stock Exchange
- Osaka Securities Exchange
- Palestine Securities Exchange
- Philippine Dealing and Exchange Corporation
- PLUS Markets Group
- Port Moresby Stock Exchange
- Saudi Arabia Stock Exchange (Tadawul)
- Singapore Commodity Exchange
- Singapore Exchange
- Shanghai Stock Exchange
- SWX Swiss Exchange
- Thailand Futures Exchange
- TLX
- Tokyo Commodity Exchange
- Trinidad and Tobago Stock Exchange
- Turkish Derivatives Exchange
- Zagreb Stock Exchange

== Business trend ==
	2011	2012	2013	2014	2015	2016	2017	2018	2019	2020	2021	2022	2023	2024	2025
Total revenue (USD bn)	3.4	3.1	3.2	3.5	3.4	3.7	3.9	4.3	4.3	5.6	5.9	6.2	6.1	7.4	8.3
Operating income (USD bn)	0.7	0.7	0.7	0.8	0.7	1.0	1.0	1.0	1.0	1.2	1.4	1.6	1.6	1.8	2.3
Net income (USD bn)	0.4	0.4	0.4	0.4	0.4	0.1	0.7	0.5	0.8	0.9	1.2	1.1	1.1	1.1	1.8
Total assets (USD bn)	14.1	9.1	12.6	12.1	11.9	14.1	15.8	15.7	13.9	18.0	20.1	20.9	32.3	30.4	31.1
Total equity (USD bn)	5.0	5.2	6.2	5.8	5.6	5.4	5.9	5.5	5.6	6.4	6.4	6.2	10.8	11.2	12.2
Number of employees	2,430	2,500	3,370	3,700	3,800	4,320	4,730	4,100	4,360	4,830	5,810	6,380	8,520	9,160	9,520

== See also ==
- List of stock exchanges
- List of European stock exchanges
- List of Danish companies
- List of Finnish companies
- List of Faroese companies
- List of Greenlandic companies
- List of Icelandic companies
- List of Swedish companies
- List of Ålandic companies
