= Verafin =

Subsidiary of Nasdaq, Inc.

- Type: Subsidiary
- Industry: fraud detection technology and anti–money laundering
- Founded: 2003; 23 years ago
- Founders: Jamie King; Brendan Brothers; Raymond Pretty
- Headquarters: St. John's, Newfoundland, Canada
- Area served: Worldwide
- Key people: Stephanie Champion (Executive Vice President, Head of Nasdaq Verafin)
- Parent: Nasdaq, Inc.
- Website: verafin.com//

Verafin Inc. is a Canadian fraud detection technology and anti–money laundering software company based in St. John's, Newfoundland and Labrador, Canada. The company was established in 2003 by Jamie King, Brendan Brothers, and Raymond Pretty.

== History ==
Verafin was founded by Jamie King, Brendan Brothers, and Raymond Pretty in 2003 in St. John’s, Newfoundland and Labrador, Canada. The company was part of Genesis, Memorial University's business incubator, and the Newfoundland and Labrador Credit Union was its first customer.

In December 2019, the company announced it had raised C$515 million, the largest venture capital funding in Canada at the time.

On November 19, 2020, American financial services company and stock exchange operator Nasdaq, Inc. announced a deal to buy the company for US$2.75 billion. The deal was completed in February 2021. At that point, the company was serving around 2,000 clients—mostly small and medium-size banks.

By 2026, the company's platform was utilized by over 2,750 financial institutions, representing over US$11 trillion in collective assets.

== Awards and recognition ==
- June 2012: Verafin was awarded the Exporter of the Year award by the Government of Newfoundland & Labrador's Department of Innovation, Business and Rural Development.
