= Auga Group =

Lithuanian food company

AUGA group, AB
- Type: Public
- Traded as: Nasdaq Baltic: AUG1L
- Industry: Organic producers
- Founded: Vilnius, 2003
- Headquarters: Vilnius, Lithuania
- Key people: Kęstutis Juščius (CEO)
- Number of employees: 1,200
- Website: auga.lt

AUGA group, AB, based in Lithuania, is one of the largest vertically integrated organic food companies in Europe. The group of companies manages approx. 39,000 ha of organically certified arable land and develops sustainable farming model, based on new technologies, specializing in crops, dairy cows and mushroom growing.

Using proprietary and contracted manufacturing, the company produces organic food products for the end consumer as well as organic commodities purchasers.

AUGA group is developing a closed-loop organic farming model in which farming activities, such as crop growing, dairy farming and mushroom growing, supplement each other.

The group of companies employ over 1,200 people.

AUGA group is listed on the Vilnius and Warsaw stock exchanges.

In 2019, AUGA group started selling products in USA market.

== Shares ==
The authorised capital of AUGA group, AB registered with the Register of Companies of the Republic of Lithuania is EUR 65 950 713,08. The authorised capital consists of 227 416 252 registered ordinary shares with a nominal value of EUR 0,29. The shares are fully paid up. On 2 April 2008, the company's shares (ISIN: LT0000127466) were included in the list of Vilnius Stock Exchange (VSE) (ticker code – AUG1L). From August 27, 2018, shares of AUGA group were upgraded to the Nasdaq Baltic Main List. On 8 July 2011, the company's shares were included in The Warsaw Stock Exchange (WSE) (ticker code – AUG).

Shareholder	% Share
UAB "Baltic Champs Group"	55,04
European Bank for Reconstruction and Development	8,71
UAB „ME Investicija“	8,39
Natural person	7
Other legal and natural persons	20,86
