= Supermontage =

Trading system used by Nasdaq

SuperMontage, abbreviated simply as SM, was an integrated trading system that was used by American stock exchange Nasdaq and implemented in 2002. It featured a fully integrated public limit order book and market maker quotations, the ability to enter multiple quotes, anonymous ordering, five-level-deep buy and sell interest, and time-stamps on individual orders. This system was retired when Nasdaq moved to a newer architecture based on the acquired technology of the Island ECN in 2006.
