= Adena Friedman =

American businesswoman (born 1969)

- Friedman in 2026
- Born: Adena Robinson Testa; 1969 (age 56–57); Baltimore, Maryland, US
- Other name: Adena Robinson Tate
- Education: Williams College (BA); Vanderbilt University (MBA)
- Occupations: Chair and CEO of Nasdaq, Inc.
- Spouse: Michael Friedman (m. 1993)
- Children: 2
- Parent(s): Adena W. Testa; Michael D. Testa

Adena T. Friedman (born Adena Robinson Testa; 1969) is an American businesswoman. She currently serves as the president and CEO of Nasdaq, Inc. She was formerly a managing director and CFO of the Carlyle Group. Initially joining Nasdaq in 1993, she returned to Nasdaq from Carlyle in May 2014 as President of Global Corporate and information technology solutions. She was named the CEO of Nasdaq in January 2017, the first woman to lead a global exchange.

== Early life and education ==
Born Adena Robinson Testa and raised in metropolitan Baltimore, she is the daughter of Michael D. Testa, a managing director at T. Rowe Price, and Adena W. Testa, an attorney in the Baltimore law firm of Stewart, Plant & Blumenthal.

She attended Roland Park Country School. She earned a BA in political science from Williams College and an MBA from Vanderbilt University's Owen Graduate School of Management.

== Career ==
After graduating from Vanderbilt University, Friedman joined Nasdaq in 1993 as an unpaid intern. At Nasdaq, she served as the head of data products and as Chief Financial Officer, amongst others, and oversaw the acquisitions of INET, OMX, the Philadelphia Stock Exchange and the Boston Stock Exchange.

She left Nasdaq in 2011 to join private investment firm Carlyle Group as Chief Financial Officer and managing director, a position she held until 2014.

Friedman returned to Nasdaq as president and Chief Operating Officer. She became CEO in January 2017, replacing Robert Greifeld.

According to Forbes Power Women list, Friedman sees Nasdaq as an "engine for capitalism," and has advocated “bringing companies back to the public market and making investing accessible.” As CEO, she is “focused on diversifying Nasdaq into a technology company with a focus on growth opportunities, such as data research services.”

In April 2019, Friedman gave a TED talk titled “What’s the future of capitalism?.” She also participated in The Economist magazine The World in 2020 issue with a column titled "Ideas for modernizing capitalism,” predicting that “the fight for the soul of the global economy will heat up.”

During the 2020 COVID-19 crisis, Friedman was featured on The New York Times Corner Office "Logged On From the Laundry Room: How the C.E.O.s of Google, Pfizer and Slack Work From Home" article, sharing perspectives of company CEOs working from home due to the pandemic. She shared her decision to split key personnel at the exchange to two teams to ensure work continuity and described her work from home routine during the crisis. The story included Alphabet CEO Sundar Pichai and Salesforce CEO Marc Benioff, among others.

Beginning in December 2020, Friedman has led the Nasdaq to implement requirements that all companies listed on the index disclose standardized diversity statistics about their corporate boards. The initiative was struck down by the US Court of Appeals for the Fifth Circuit four years later, which ruled that the US Securities and Exchange Commission had exceeded its statutory authority in approving these requirements, leading Nasdaq to withdraw the rule.

In 2023, she was appointed chair of the board of directors of Nasdaq. That year, Friedman's total compensation from Nasdaq, Inc. was $18.5 million, representing a CEO-to-median worker pay ratio of 157-to-1. Friedman was honored by American Banker as one of The Most Powerful Women in Banking for 2024.

== Boards ==
Friedman served as a Class B director of the Federal Reserve Bank of New York from December 2018 through December 2025. She also serves on the board of FCLTGlobal, a non-profit organization that researches tools that encourage long-term investing.

== Personal life ==
In 1993, she married Michael Cameron Friedman in a Presbyterian ceremony in Baltimore, Maryland. Her husband is a retired lawyer. They have two sons. They live in Maryland. She has a black belt in taekwondo, which she started studying after taking her sons to classes and she has said has helped her become more fearless in business.

== Recognitions ==
Forbes has repeatedly listed Friedman as one of the world's most powerful women on their annual Power Women list. In 2025, she ranked 45th .

She was ranked 40th on Fortune's list of Most Powerful Women in 2026.
