= Snaigė =

Refrigerator manufacturer in Lithuania

AB Snaigė
- Headquarters: Alytus, Pramonės street 6, Lithuania
- Key people: Darius Varnas
- Products: Refrigerators and freezers
- Revenue: ▼€11.386 million (2024)
- Operating income: ▼ - €3.399 million (2024)
- Net income: ▲ - €3.241 million (2024)
- Total equity: ▼ - €8.271 million (2024)
- Owner: UAB EDS INVEST 3 (91.1%)
- Number of employees: ▼229
- Website: www.snaige.lt

AB Snaigė (literally: snowflake) is a Lithuanian industrial company and the only producer of refrigerators in the Baltic countries, with manufacturing plants in Alytus. It was previously listed on the NASDAQ OMX Vilnius stock exchange. The company was established in 1963. The unaudited consolidated sales revenue of AB "Snaigė" exceeded 30 million during the three quarters of 2017. EUR and were slightly lower than last year during the same period. The company earned 1.6 million EUR EBITDA (in unaudited consolidated data) vol. i.e. 56 percent less than last year during the same period. About 97% of the production is exported to more than 30 countries.

SNAIGE AB produces domestic and storage refrigerators, freezers, pharmaceutical and laboratory refrigerators and freezers, monoblocks for cold rooms and vertical coolers of over 30 models in about 200 modifications. The company has a production capacity of 550,000 refrigerators and freezers per year. The company has been awarded the Lithuanian Innovation Prize several times and is recognized as one of the most innovative companies in the country. Refrigerators Snaigė have been a few times presented with Lithuanian "Product of the Year" Gold medals.

Works according integrated management system (ISO 9001, ISO 14001, OHSAS 18001) used throughout the production process.

In September 2023, the controlling package of the company was acquired by an investment company owned by the UAB "Easy Debt Service" for €0.5M. On 1 November 2024, the company's shares were delisted from the stock exchange after the shareholders decided to take it private.
