= Nasdaq Riga =

Stock exchange located in Riga, Latvia

Coordinates: 56.9509°N 24.1090°E

Nasdaq Riga, AS
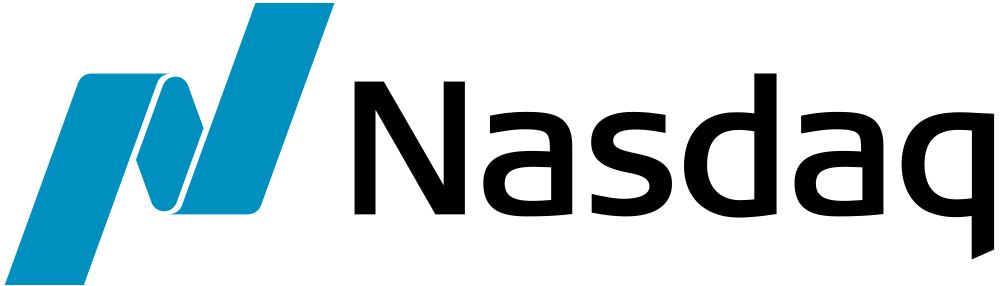

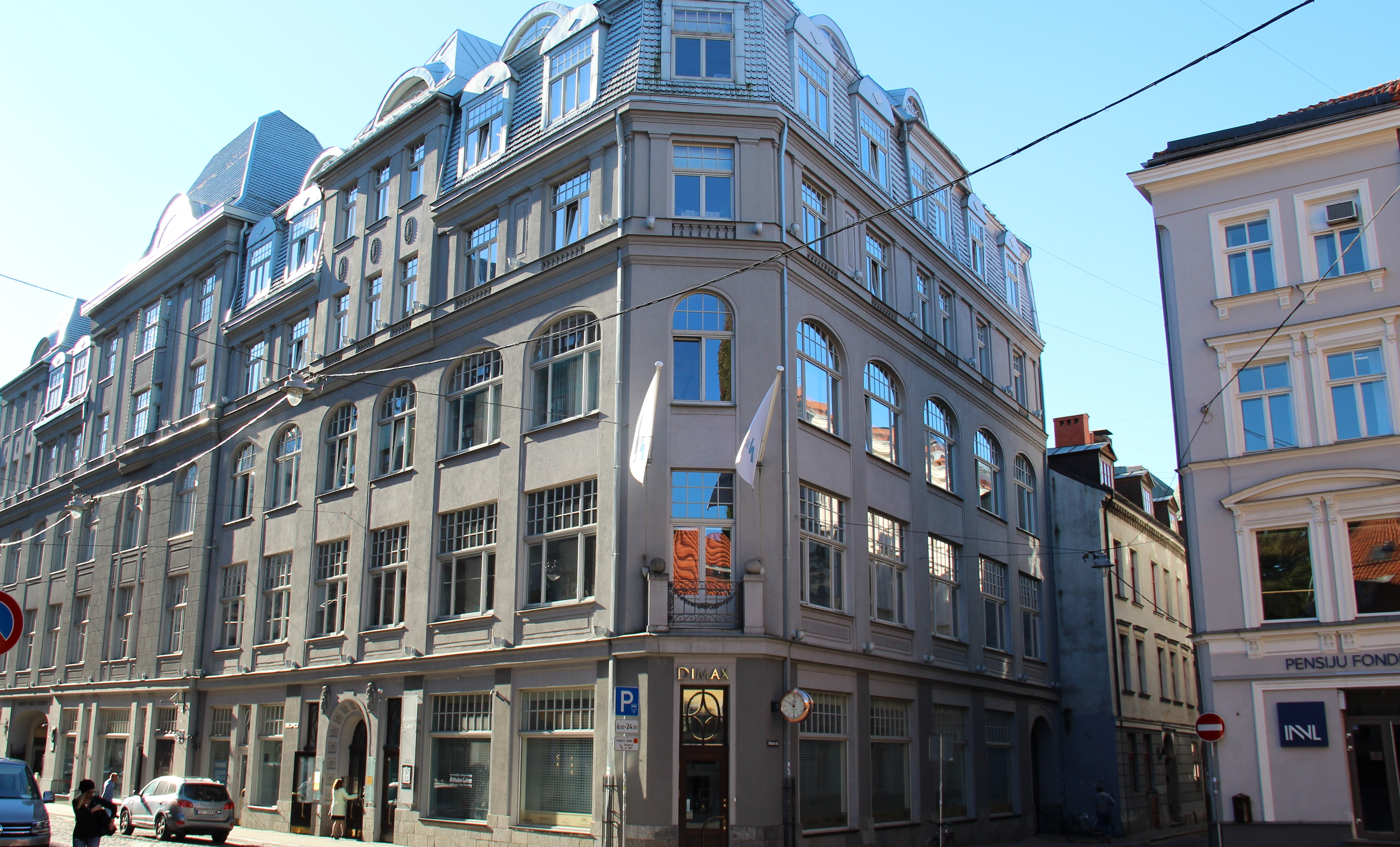
- Nasdaq Riga office in Riga, Latvia
- Industry: Financial services
- Founded: 1993 in Riga, Latvia
- Headquarters: Vaļņu iela 1, Riga, Latvia
- Area served: Latvia, Nasdaq Baltic market
- Key people: Daiga Auziņa-Melalksne, CEO
- Products: Listing, trading, market data
- Revenue: 1,373,627 (2022)
- Net income: 616,351 (2022)
- Total assets: 1,930,903 (2022)
- Owner: Nasdaq Nordic (92.98%)
- Number of employees: 9 (2022)
- Website: nasdaqbaltic.com

Stock exchanges (listing venues) owned by Nasdaq, Inc.

The Nasdaq Riga, formerly Riga Stock Exchange, is the sole stock exchange operating in Riga, Latvia. Nasdaq Riga is licensed and supervised by the Bank of Latvia. It is owned by Nasdaq, which also operates exchanges in the USA, Denmark, Sweden, Finland, Iceland, Armenia, Lithuania, and Estonia. Established in 1993.

Riga Stock Exchange, together with Vilnius Stock Exchange and Tallinn Stock Exchange is part of the joint Baltic market that was established to minimize investing barriers between Latvian, Lithuanian and Estonian markets.

OMX Riga (OMXRGI) is an all-share index consisting of all the shares listed on the Riga Stock Exchange.

The exchange has a pre-market session from 08:30am to 10:00am, a normal trading session from 10:00am to 04:00pm, and a post-market session from 04:00pm to 04:30pm.

== See also ==
- List of stock exchanges
- List of European stock exchanges
- Nasdaq Copenhagen
- Nasdaq Stockholm
- Nasdaq Helsinki
- Nasdaq Vilnius
- Nasdaq Tallinn
- Nasdaq Iceland
