= Nasdaq First North =

Multilateral trading facility owned by Nasdaq

Nasdaq First North Growth Market is a division of Nasdaq Nordic and an alternative stock exchange (legally a multilateral trading facility) for smaller companies in Europe. The market place Nya Marknaden in Stockholm changed name to First North in June 2006 and the First North exchange expanded to the stock exchange on Iceland in January 2007 and Helsinki in April 2007.

First North uses a less extensive rulebook than the main market. Unlike the regulated main market, every company on First North has a Certified Adviser to ensure that companies comply with all requirements and rules. It shares a single trading system with the main markets.

Around 550 companies were listed on Nasdaq First North in early 2024.

== See also ==
Stock market lists

- List of stock exchanges
- List of European stock exchanges
- Nasdaq Copenhagen
- Nasdaq Stockholm
- Nasdaq Helsinki
- Nasdaq Vilnius
- Nasdaq Riga
- Nasdaq Tallinn
- Nasdaq Iceland

Other lists

- List of Danish companies
- List of Finnish companies
- List of Icelandic companies
- List of Swedish companies
