= Nasdaq Helsinki =

Finnish stock exchange

Coordinates: 60.1684°N 24.9492°E

- Helsingin pörssi, Helsingforsbörsen
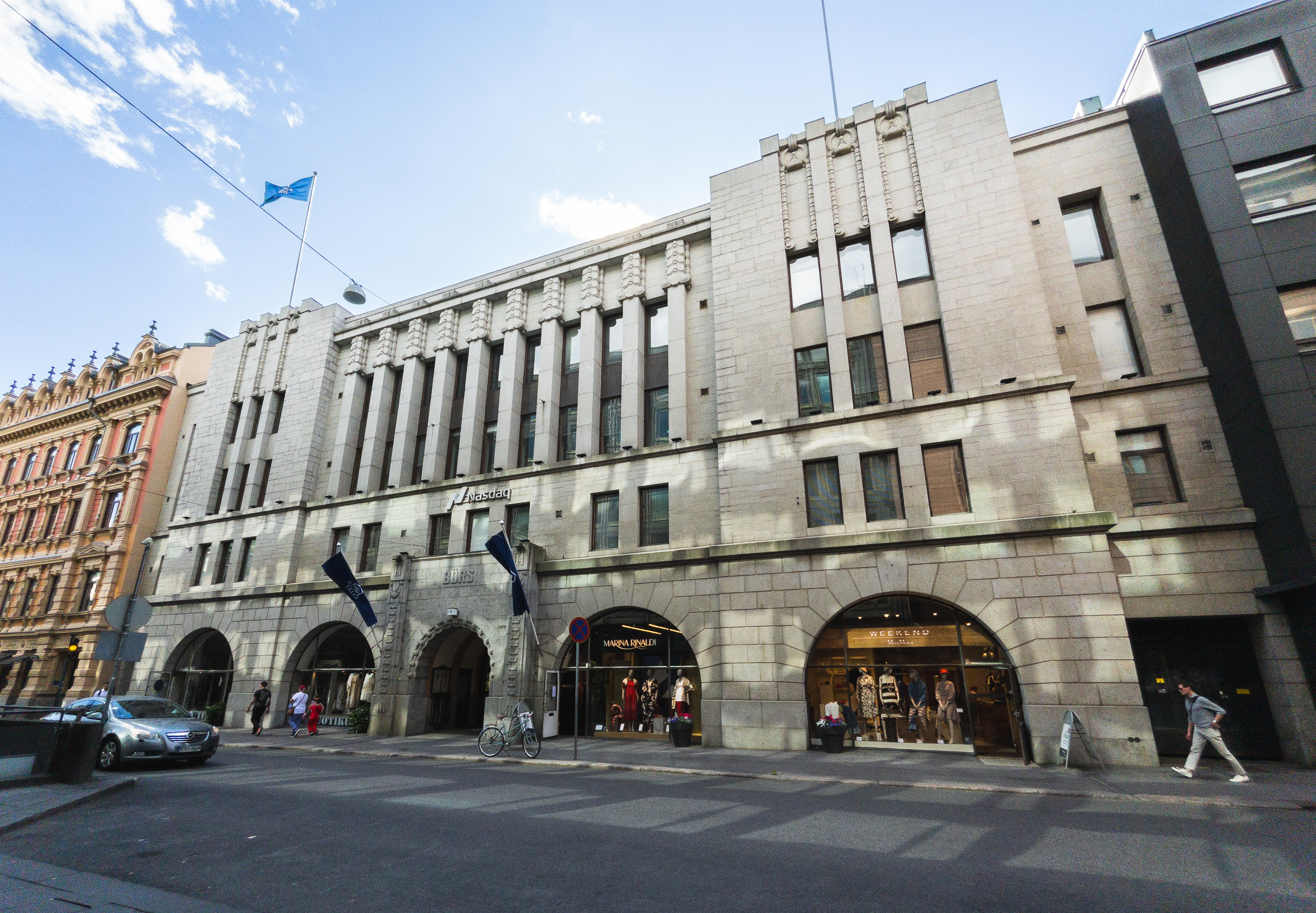
- Type: Stock exchange
- Location: Helsinki, Finland
- Founded: October 7, 1912; 114 years ago
- Owner: Nasdaq, Inc.
- Currency: Euro
- No. of listings: 134 Main Market and 50 Nasdaq First North companies (as of April 2024)
- Indices: OMX Helsinki 25
- Website: www.nasdaqomxnordic.com

Nasdaq Helsinki, formerly known as the Helsinki Stock Exchange (Finnish: Helsingin Pörssi, Swedish: Helsingforsbörsen), is a stock exchange located in Helsinki, Finland. Since 3 September 2003, it has been part of Nasdaq Nordic (previously called OMX). After the OMX merger, it was referred to as OMX Helsinki (OMXH), then after NASDAQ's acquisition of OMX in February 2008, NASDAQ OMX Helsinki, and currently Nasdaq Helsinki.

== History ==
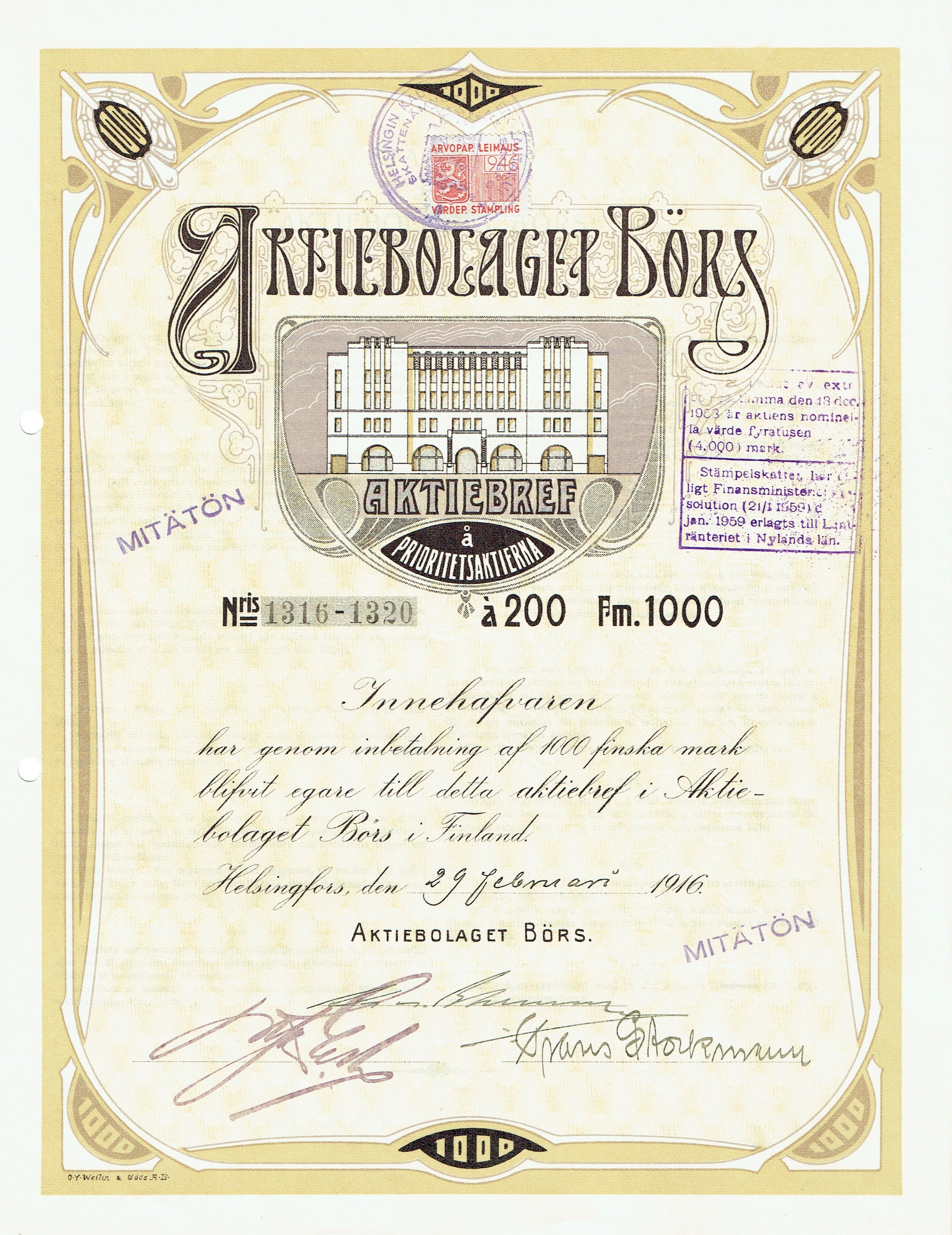
Share of AB Börs, issued 29 february 1916 with illustration of the stock exchange building designed by architect Lars Sonck

The Helsinki Stock Exchange was founded during the era of the Grand Duchy of Finland in 1912.

The Helsinki Stock Exchange saw its first transaction on October 7, 1912. From then it remained a "free form" financial association until in 1984 it was converted into a cooperative owned mostly by banks, traders, other companies and associations.

The exchange went through a colorful history, including significant growth during World War I, when the number of companies nearly multiplied tenfold due to Russian Empire's wartime demand. The exchange's performance and returns have been volatile, experiencing bubbles, downturns, impacts of wars, Finnish independence, the civil war, economic crises, and technological development.

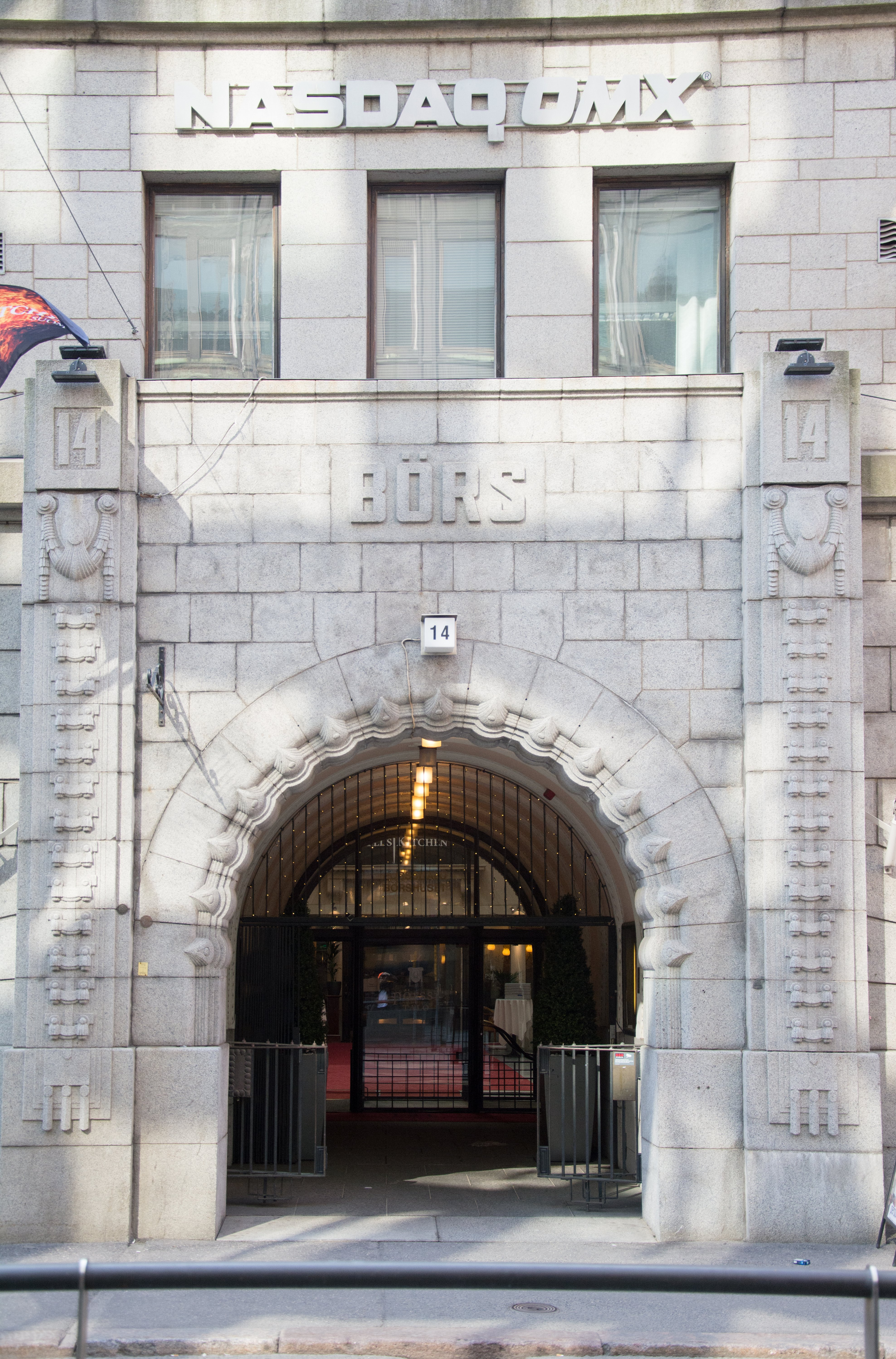
Main entrance at Fabianinkatu

On April 1, 1990, trading was moved to a new digital system: HETI (Helsinki Stock Exchange Automated Trading and Information System, and in Finnish a rough backronym for "immediately"), which replaced the electro-mechanical trading system originally introduced back in 1935. HETI enabled remote traders to conduct transactions on equal terms with those in the trading room.

The cooperative changed to a limited liability company (Helsingin Arvopaperipörssi) in the fall of 1995 and merged with several clearing and stock deposit companies and associations at the beginning of 1997. During 1997 and 1998 the Stock Exchange bought both of the Finnish derivative exchanges and merged them with itself to become HEX. In November 1998 HEX merged with Arvopaperikeskus to form Helsinki Exchanges Group Plc, which then changed its name to HEX Plc in the spring of 2001. In 2001 and 2002 HEX acquired a majority share of the Tallinn Stock Exchange and the Riga Stock Exchange.

On 3 September 2003, HEX Plc merged with OM AB, owner of the Stockholm Stock Exchange, to become OM HEX. A year later, the company was renamed to OMX.

OMX Helsinki 25 (OMXH25) is the leading share index on Nasdaq Helsinki. It is a market value weighted index that consists of the 25 most-traded on Nasdaq Helsinki. OMXH25 was earlier known by its old name, HEX25.

== Hours ==
Interior of the building

Normal trading sessions are from 10:00 am to 6:30 pm on all days of the week except Saturdays, Sundays and holidays declared by the Exchange in advance.

== See also ==
Stock market lists

- Nasdaq Copenhagen
- Nasdaq Stockholm
- Nasdaq Nordic
- Nasdaq Vilnius
- Nasdaq Riga
- Nasdaq Tallinn
- Nasdaq Iceland
- Nasdaq First North

Other lists

- List of Finnish companies
- List of Ålandic companies

=== Social club ===
- Helsinki Bourse Club
