= Novaturas =

Lithuanian travel company

- Industry: tourism
- Founded: 1999; 26 years ago
- Headquarters: Lithuania
- Key people: Kristijonas Kaikaris (CEO)
- Number of employees: 155(2024)
- Website: www.novaturas.lt

Novaturas is a Lithuanian travel and leisure company. The company is the largest tour operator in Baltics. Taking into consideration the organized chartered flights market in Baltics, the company owns about 40% of this market. Novaturas works with more than 400 travel agencies in Poland.

The company offers over 30 destinations worldwide.

The company is established in 1999. In 2007, the company was taken over by the Polish company Central European Tour Operator.

Since 2018, the company is listed in Nasdaq Vilnius.

Almost 300,000 customers used the services of the Novaturo group in 2019.

In 2020, the shares of Central European Tour Operator, the main shareholder that left Novaturo, were bought by three Estonian companies that jointly own 25% of the company's shares. In addition to the above-mentioned Estonian companies, 9.99% of the shares of the Novaturas Group are owned by ME Investicija, which controls Girteka Logistics, 9.49% by Ugnius Radvila, and 6.86% by Vidas Paliūnas and Rytis Šūmakaris.
