= Adenza =

Capital markets software company

Adenza Group, Inc.
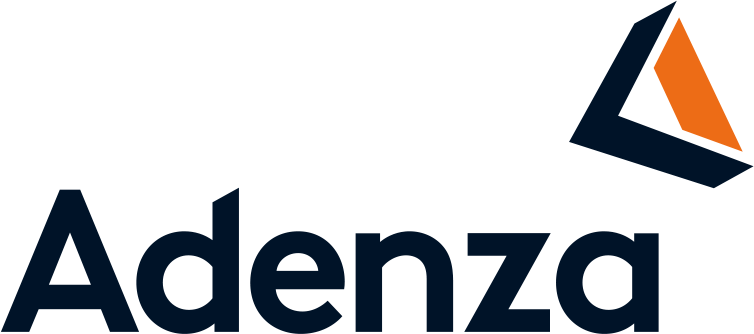
- Formerly: AxiomSL; Calypso Technology
- Type: Private
- Industry: Fintech; Information technology
- Founded: 1997; 29 years ago
- Headquarters: London, UK; New York City, US
- Number of locations: 22 offices (2019)
- Products: Software
- Owner: Bridgepoint Capital (2016–2021); Summit Partners (2016–2021); Thoma Bravo (2021–2023); Nasdaq, Inc. (2023-Present)

Adenza Group, Inc. is a software application provider specializing in capital markets, investment management, central banking, risk management, clearing, collateral and treasury & liquidity. Their integrated suite of trading and risk applications is used by banks and other financial companies.

Previously known as AxiomSL and Calypso Technology, the company had its acquisition by Nasdaq, Inc. completed in November 2023.

== History ==
Dual-headquartered in London and New York City, Calypso Technology was founded in 1997 by Charles Marston and Kishore Bopardikar. It was acquired by private equity firms Bridgepoint and Summit Partners in June 2016. The company has over 20 offices in 18 countries.

Calypso's software is written entirely in Java and serves front office, middle office, and back office functions, allowing financial institutions to consolidate their infrastructure on a single platform. Their flagship product, Bank-in-a-Box, bundles the software with a Target Operating Model for the processing of all asset classes, as well as pre-configured business workflows and market best practices.

In July 2017, Calypso completed the acquisition of a minority stake in Sernova Financial.

In March 2021, Thoma Bravo bought Calypso from its then owners for $3.7bn. Later that year, Thoma Bravo merged Calypso with AxiomSL and created Adenza.

In June 2023, Nasdaq, Inc. announced that it had agreed to acquire Adenza in a $10.5 billion cash-and-stock deal, the biggest for the US exchange operator to date. The acquisition was completed in November 2023.

In 2025, Nasdaq completed the integration of Adenza as part of its strategy to expand beyond exchange operations and position itself as a diversified technology company.
