= Nasdaq Copenhagen =

Stock exchange in Copenhagen, Denmark

Coordinates: 55°40′45″N 12°34′53″E

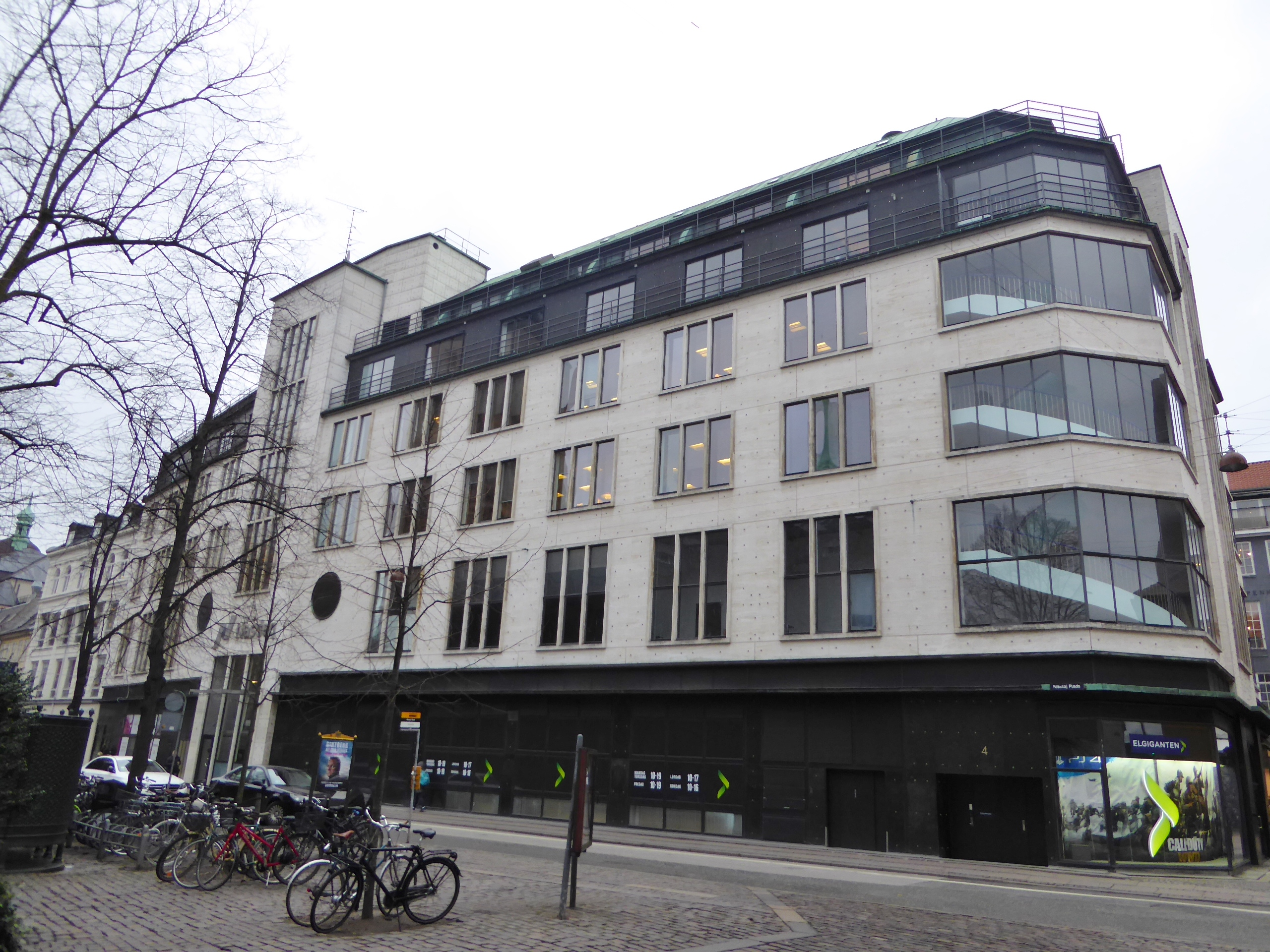
- Type: Stock exchange
- Location: Copenhagen, Denmark
- Founded: 1625; 1808
- Owner: Nasdaq Nordic
- Key people: Bjørn Sibbern (Director)
- Currency: Danish krone (primary); Euro (secondary)
- Market cap: €622 billion
- Volume: €172.5 billion (Q4 2006 - Q3 2007)
- Indices: KAX Index; OMX Copenhagen 25; KFX Index
- Website: nasdaqomxnordic.com

Stock exchanges (listing venues) owned by Nasdaq, Inc.

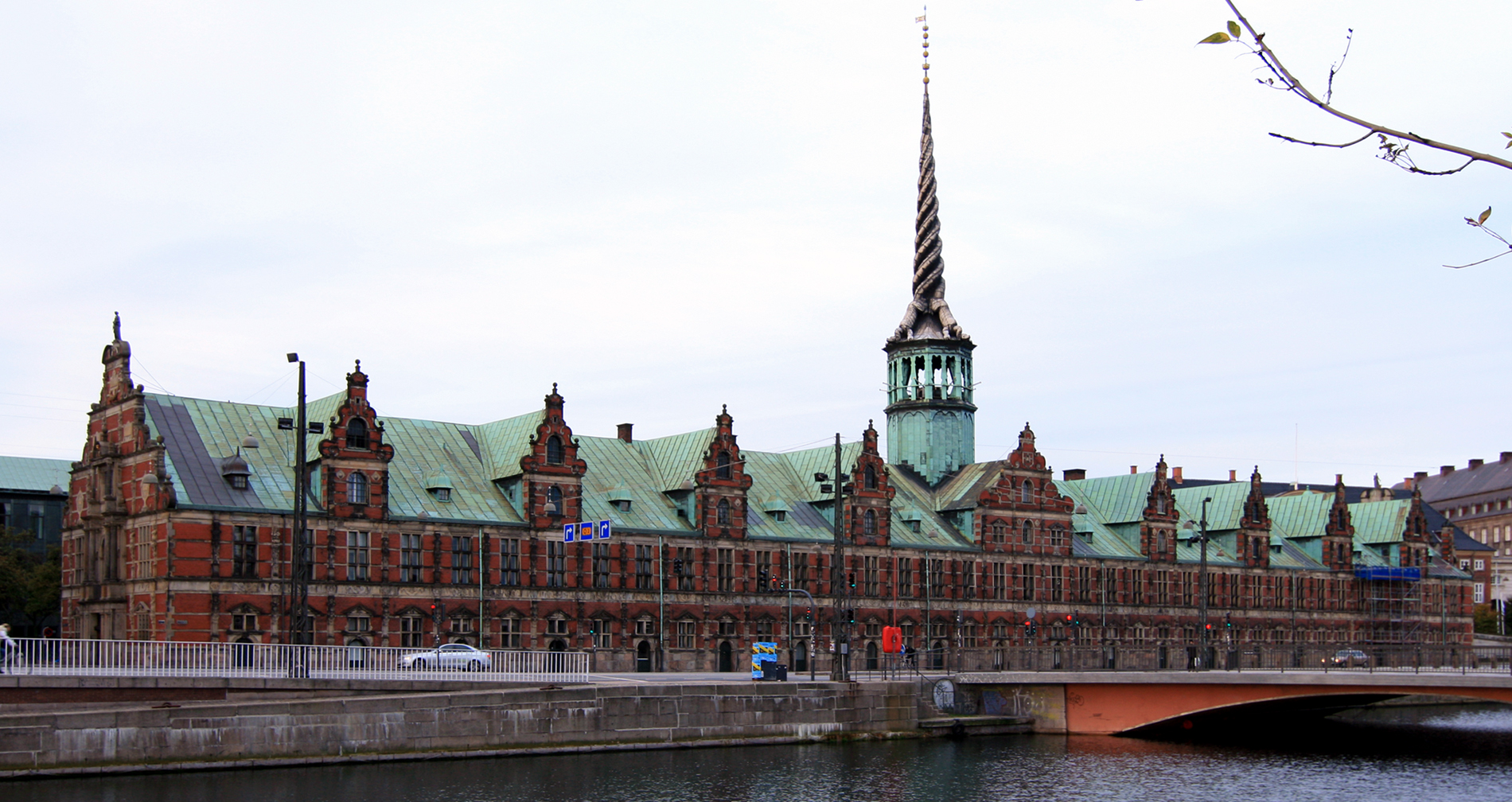
This building, Børsen, housed the Copenhagen Stock Exchange until 1974.

The Nasdaq Copenhagen, formerly known as the Copenhagen Stock Exchange (Danish: Københavns Fondsbørs), is an international marketplace for Danish securities, including shares, bonds, treasury bills and notes, and financial futures and options.

Nasdaq Copenhagen is one of the Nasdaq Nordic Exchanges. Nasdaq Nordic goes back to the 2003 merger of OM AB and HEX plc to form OMX and is, since February 2008, part of Nasdaq, Inc. (formerly known as NASDAQ OMX Group).

== Background and structure ==
The exchange was converted to a limited company in 1996 with share capital issued in a ratio of 60-20-20 to members, issuers of shares, and issuers of bonds. In 1997 the FUTOP Clearing Center A/S, the Danish derivatives market, became a wholly owned subsidiary. FUTOP issues, clears, and guarantees futures and options on shares, indices, and interest rate products. FUTOP products can be traded electronically. In 1998, the CSE and the Stockholmsbörsen formed the NOREX Alliance, a step toward developing a Nordic securities market. Normal trading sessions are from 09:00am to 05:00pm on all days of the week except Saturdays, Sundays and holidays declared by the exchange in advance.

== CSE indices ==
The C25 Index, a weighted, market value index comprising 25 Danish blue chips, launched for futures and options trading (members include the A.P. Moller-Maersk Group). The KFX Index comprises growth companies in the medical, telecommunications, biotechnology, and information technology sectors on the exchanges KVX Growth Market. The KAX Index is the exchange's all-share index, introduced in 2001 to replace the previous all-share index. It conforms to the Global Industry Classification Standard developed by Morgan Stanley Dean Witter and Standard & Poor's.

== See also ==
=== Other lists ===
- List of Danish companies
- List of Finnish companies
- List of Faroese companies
- List of Greenlandic companies

=== Stock market lists ===
- Nasdaq Nordic
- Nasdaq Stockholm
- Nasdaq Helsinki
- Nasdaq Vilnius
- Nasdaq Riga
- Nasdaq Tallinn
- Nasdaq Iceland
- Nasdaq First North
