= TV Åland =

TV station in Åland

- Country: Finland
- Broadcast area: Åland
- Owner: Ålands Radio and TV
- Launch date: 1984; 41 years ago
- Channels: Channel 9 (Mariehamn, Jomala); Channel 4 Channel 5 (Godby)
- Official website: www.tv.ax

TV Åland is a privately owned local television channel broadcasting mainly in the urban areas of Åland, an autonomous province of Finland.

== History ==
TV Åland began its operations during the fall of 1984, with its first broadcast occurring in September that year. The channel has been operated by several companies during its existence: Ålands Videoproduktion Ab was the principal production company until its bankruptcy in the mid-1990s, at which point Weman Media Ab took over operations. The channel is currently run by TV Åland Productions Ab.

== Broadcast ==
The channel is available via MCA network, Vikingaåsens antennförening and Godby antennförening. Ålcom IPTV also offers a VoD service. Programming has also been distributed via Ålands Radio and TV and local antenna operators throughout Åland.

The channel reaches approximately 80% of the people of Åland.
