= Nasdaq Stockholm =

Stock exchange in Stockholm, Sweden

Nasdaq Stockholm AB
- Stockholmsbörsen
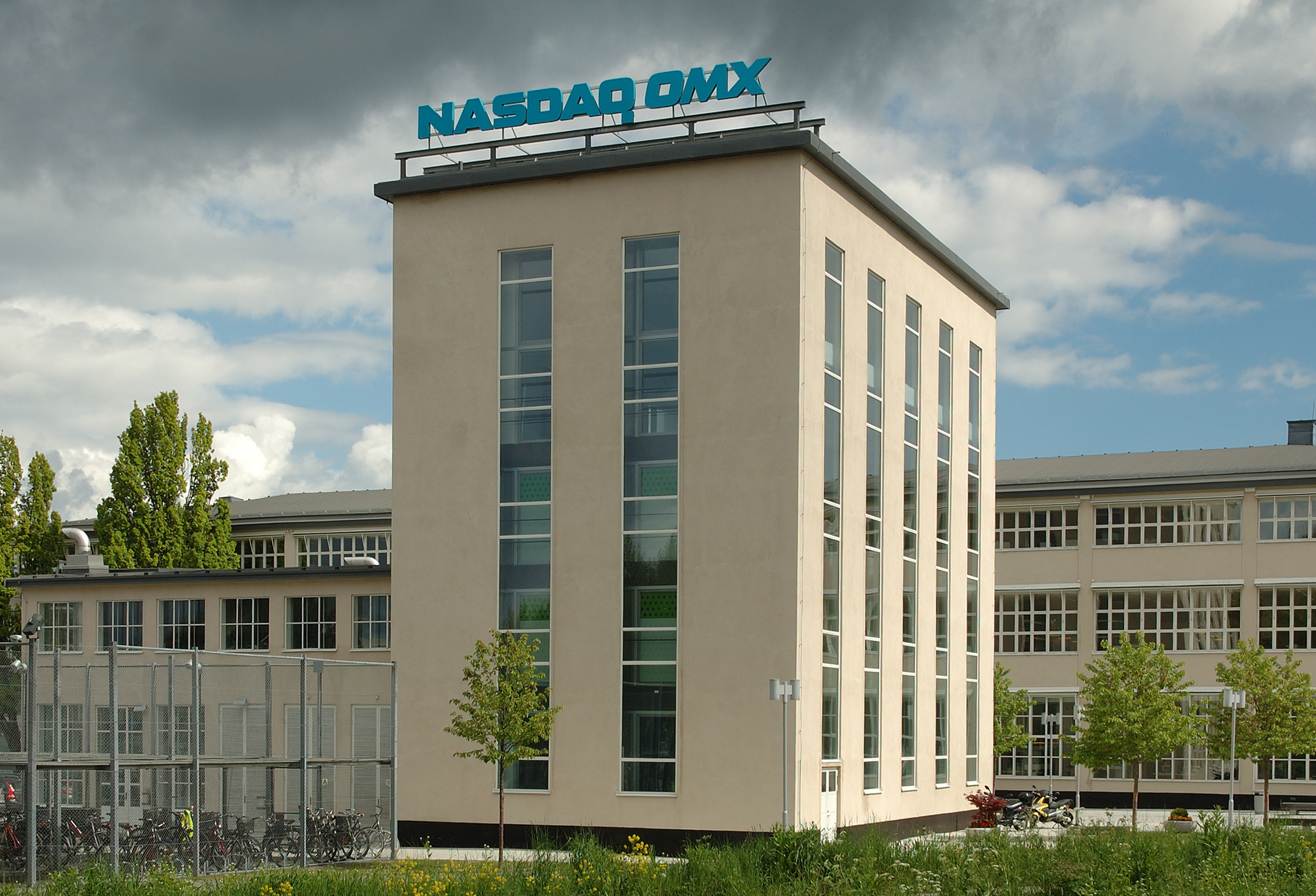
- Nasdaq AB headquarters in Stockholm, March 2011
- Type: Stock exchange
- Location: Stockholm, Sweden
- Coordinates: 59.3401°N 18.1215°E
- Founded: 1863
- Owner: Nasdaq Nordic
- Currency: Swedish krona
- No. of listings: 383
- Market cap: USD 1.3 trillion (Nov 2021)
- Indices: OMX Stockholm 30
- Website: www.nasdaqomxnordic.com

Nasdaq Stockholm, formerly and colloquially known as the Stockholm Stock Exchange (Swedish: Stockholmsbörsen), is a stock exchange located in Frihamnen, Stockholm, Sweden. Founded in 1863, it has become the primary securities exchange of the Nordic countries. As of March 2021, a total of 832 companies are listed on Nasdaq Stockholm with 385 companies on the main market and additional 447 listed on secondary markets (Nasdaq First North and Nasdaq First North Premier).

Stock exchanges (listing venues) owned by Nasdaq, Inc.

== History ==
The first trade took place on 4 February 1863. The Stockholm Stock Exchange was acquired by futures exchange OM in 1998. After OM merged with the Helsinki Stock Exchange to form what is now OMX in 2003, the Stockholm and Helsinki exchanges' operations were merged. Since 2008, the Stockholm Stock Exchange has been part of Nasdaq, Inc. (formerly called Nasdaq OMX Group) and its Nasdaq Nordic markets. As of October 2014, the exchange operated under the legal name Nasdaq OMX Stockholm AB (renamed Nasdaq Stockholm AB in 2015).

Prior to the introduction of electronic trading on 1 June 1990, all trading was conducted on the floor of the Stockholm Stock Exchange Building.

Its normal trading sessions are from 09:00 to 17:30 on all days of the week except Saturdays, Sundays and holidays declared by the Exchange in advance.

== Listed companies ==
Market (Stockholm)	Number of listed companies	Date	References
Nasdaq main market	383	31 March 2021	
First North	298	31 March 2021	
First North Premier	73	31 March 2021	

== See also ==
Stock market lists

- List of stock exchanges
- List of European stock exchanges
- Nasdaq Nordic
- Nasdaq Copenhagen
- Nasdaq Helsinki
- Nasdaq Vilnius
- Nasdaq Riga
- Nasdaq Tallinn
- Nasdaq Iceland
- Nasdaq First North

Other lists

- List of companies of Sweden
- List of largest Swedish companies
- List of largest Nordic companies
- List of Ålandic companies
