= Åland24 =

Coordinates: 60.1183°N 19.9344°E

Åland24 is a privately owned local television channel broadcasting mainly online and in the urban areas of Åland, an autonomous province of Finland.

Åland24 began its operations during the fall of 2007, with its first broadcast occurring in October that year. The largest owner is Nya Ålands Tidningsaktiebolag. Productions include daily news broadcasts, weekly sports shows and debate shows.
