= Directors Desk =

Directors Desk is a paperless boardroom for information sharing. It was founded in 2003 by a team of corporate governance and technology specialists and was acquired by the NASDAQ OMX Group in 2007. Its solutions are used by more than 1,000 directors around the world. Directors Desk products are available as either a hosted solution or a software license.
