= Ulrike Auga =

German feminist theologian (born 1964)

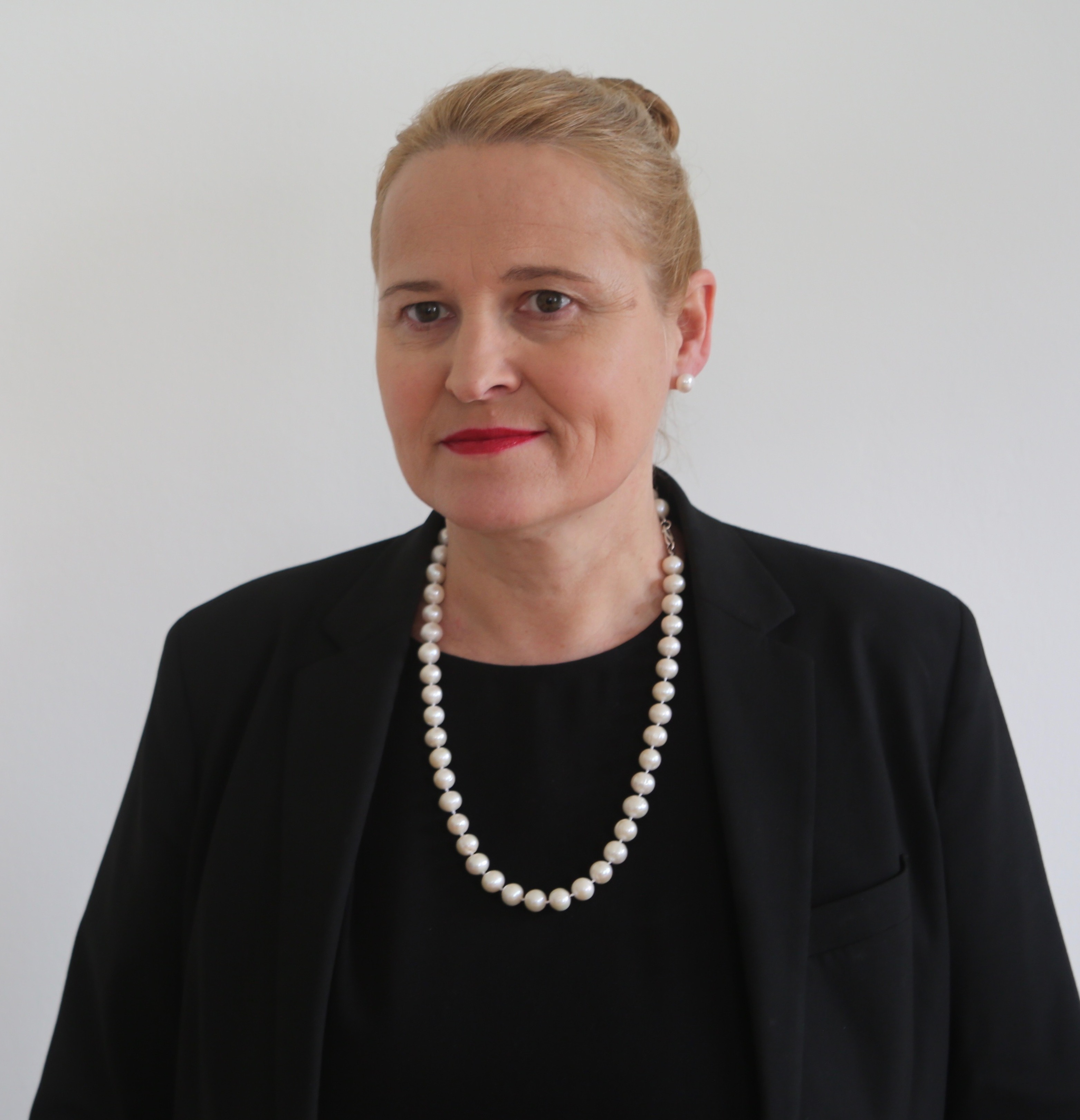
Auga in 2017

Ulrike Ernst-Auga (born 1964) is a German theologian and academic. She is professor of theology and gender studies at the Humboldt University of Berlin and president of the International Association for the Study of Religion and Gender.

She is a member of the Center of Theological Inquiry at Princeton, New Jersey, United States, and of the Zentrum für transdisziplinäre Geschlechterstudien (Center for Transdisciplinary Gender Studies) at the Humboldt University of Berlin, and a former acting professor of mission, ecumencism and religious studies in the department of protestant theology of the University of Hamburg.

== Selected publications ==
- Auga, Ulrike (2020). An epistemology of religion and gender: biopolitics - performativity - agency. Abingdon New York (N.Y.): Routledge. ISBN 9780429276002.
- Auga, Ulrike; Von Braun, Christina, eds. (2006). Gender in conflicts: Palestine, Israel, Germany. Münster: Lit. ISBN 9783825892814.
- Auga, Ulrike, ed. (2010). Das Geschlecht der Wissenschaften: Zur Geschichte von Akademikerinnen im 19. und 20. Jahrhundert (1. Auflage ed.). Weinheim: Campus Verlag. ISBN 9783593408644.
- Ernst-Auga, Ulrike (2025). "Reimagining Religious Studies through Postcolonial, Intersectional, and Queer Frameworks: From Deessentialization, Deconstruction, and Disidentification to Agency, Human Flourishing, Minor Discourses, and Becoming". The Palgrave Handbook of Queer and Trans Studies in Religion: 25–45. doi:10.1007/978-3-031-88256-2_3.
- Auga, Ulrike; Schirr, Bertram J. (September 2014). "Do Not Conform to the Patterns of this World! A Postcolonial Investigation of Performativity, Metamorphoses and Bodily Materiality in Romans 12". Feminist Theology. 23 (1): 37–54. doi:10.1177/0966735014542377.
- Plöckinger, Ursula; Auga, Ulrike (17 November 2022). "The "Four Principles" of Western Medical Bioethics and the Bioethics of Shīʿī Islam in Iran". Religions. doi:10.18452/25865.
