= Nasdaq Vilnius =

Lithuanian stock market index

Coordinates: 54°41′47″N 25°16′37″E

- Nasdaq Vilnius is located in K29 business centre on the Konstitucijos Avenue.
- Type: Stock exchange
- Location: Vilnius, Lithuania
- Founded: 1993
- Owner: Nasdaq Nordic
- No. of listings: 29
- Indices: OMX Vilnius (OMXVGI)
- Website: nasdaqbaltic.com

Stock exchanges (listing venues) owned by Nasdaq, Inc.

The Nasdaq Vilnius is a stock exchange established in 1993 (Vilnius Stock Exchange, VSE) and currently operated by Nasdaq, Inc. Shares are listed on a Nasdaq Baltic stock exchange together with stocks from Latvia and Estonia.

OMX Vilnius (OMXVGI) is a stock market index for the Nasdaq Vilnius Exchange.

== History ==
VSE, together with Riga Stock Exchange and Tallinn Stock Exchange is part of the joint Baltic market that was established to minimize investing barriers between Estonian, Latvian and Lithuanian markets (OMX Baltic 10).

== Trading day ==
It has a pre-market session from 08:45am to 10:00am, a normal trading session from 10:00am to 04:00pm and post-market session from 04:00pm to 04:30pm.

== Companies ==
As of June 15, 2018, market capitalization of Vilnius stock exchange equities was 3.9 billion euro, and consist of 30 companies.

Company	Ticker	P/E	Volume in Jan-Oct 2010, EUR	Market cap 31 Oct 2010, EUR
Amber Grid	AMG1L	30.83		
Apranga	APG1L	12.65	11,433,422	89,676,488
AUGA group	AUG1L			
Energijos Skirstymo Operatorius	ESO1L			
Grigeo	GRG1L	12.16	3,041,366	46,918,443
Gubernija	GUB1L	neg.	60,172	3,199,009
Invalda INVL	IVL1L	10.76	4,955,506	94,258,711
INVL Baltic Farmland	INL1L			
INVL Baltic Real Estate	INR1L			
INVL Technology	INC1L			
Kauno energija	KNR1L	neg.	48,000	14,098,038
Klaipėdos nafta	KNF1L	12.72	4,531,154	192,157,091
K2 LT	K2LT			
LITGRID	LGD1L	174.81		
Linas	LNS1L	neg.	614,502	2,645,626
Linas Agro Group	LNA1L	8.33	10,722,344	87,461,410
Lietuvos energijos gamyba	LNR1L	12.30		
Novaturas	NTU1L			
Panevėžio statybos trestas	PTR1L	16.87	6,122,845	25,617,904
Pieno žvaigždės	PZV1L	57.22	3,082,852	79,279,254
Rokiškio sūris	RSU1L	6.70	3,724,010	58,678,346
Šiaulių bankas	SAB1L	10.20	3,414,311	67,043,852
Snaigė	SNG1L	neg.	8,017,242	8,990,695
Telia Lietuva	TEL1L	14.65	35,463,671	524,207,839
Utenos trikotažas	UTR1L	neg.	216,111	7,582,676
Vilkiškių pieninė	VLP1L	5.79	1,331,648	14,458,335
Vilniaus baldai	VBL1L	11.79	810,297	34,767,953
Vilniaus degtinė	VDG1L	104.21	41,405	10,886,522
Žemaitijos pienas	ZMP1L	5.50	2,743,477	26,759,804

== Companies formerly listed on Nasdaq Vilnius ==
- Agrowill Group
- Akmenės cementas
- Alita
- Alytaus tekstilė
- Anykščių vynas
- Vakarų laivų gamykla
- Bankas Hermis
- Biržų akcinė pieno bedrovė
- City Service
- Dirbtinis pluoštas
- Dvarčionių keramika
- DnB NORD bankas
- Ekranas
- Endokrininiai preparatai
- Energijos skirstymo operatorius
- Ignitis gamyba
- Kalnapilis
- Kauno pienas
- Kėdainių cukrus
- Kauno tiekimas
- Klaipėdos baldai
- Klaipėdos jūrų krovinių kompanija
- Krekenavos agrofirma
- Kuro aparatūra
- Lietkabelis
- Lietuvos dujos
- Lietuvos draudimas
- Lietuvos jūrų laivininkystė
- Limarko laivininkystės kompanija
- Lietuvos Taupomasis Bankas
- Lifosa
- Lisco Baltic Service
- Liteksas ir Calw
- Lithun
- Marijampolės pieno konservai
- Mažeikių elektrinė
- Mažeikių Nafta
- Mažeikių pieninė
- Medienos plaušas
- Metalo komercija
- Naftos terminalas
- Naujieji Verkiai
- Panevėžio pienas
- Panevėžio cukrus
- Pramprojektas
- Ragutis
- Sanatorija Eglė
- Sanitas
- Sema
- Snaigė
- Snoras
- Stumbras
- Šiaulių oda
- Šiaulių stumbras
- Švyturys
- Trinyčiai
- Utenos gėrimai
- Ūkio bankas
- Šiaulių stumbras
- Viešbutis Lietuva
- Vilniaus bankas
- Vilniaus kailiai
- Vilniaus Pergalė
- Žiemys

== See also ==
- List of stock exchanges
- List of European stock exchanges
- Nasdaq Copenhagen
- Nasdaq Stockholm
- Nasdaq Helsinki
- Nasdaq Nordic
- Nasdaq Riga
- Nasdaq Tallinn
- Nasdaq Iceland
