= List of companies of Åland =

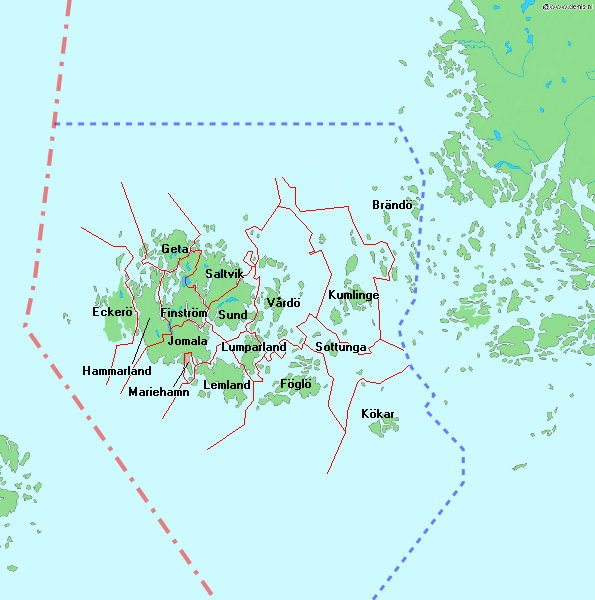
Municipalities of Åland

Åland is an archipelago at the entrance to the Gulf of Bothnia in the Baltic Sea belonging to Finland. Åland's economy is heavily dominated by shipping, trade and tourism. Shipping represents about 40% of the economy, with several international carriers owned and operated off Åland. Most companies aside from shipping are small, with fewer than ten employees. Farming and fishing are important in combination with the food industry. According to Eurostat, in 2006 Åland was the 20th wealthiest of the EU's 268 regions, and the wealthiest in Finland, with a GDP per inhabitant 47% above the EU mean. In 2015 it had the 34th highest regional gross domestic product (PPS of 39 700 EUR per inhabitant) of the 340 NUTS 2 regions, the second within the country after Helsinki-Uusimaa (42 400 EUR).

== Notable firms ==
This list includes notable companies with primary headquarters located in the country. The industry and sector follow the Industry Classification Benchmark taxonomy. Organizations which have ceased operations are included and noted as defunct.

Notable companies Status: P=Private, S=State; A=Active, D=Defunct
Name	Industry	Sector	Headquarters	Founded	Notes	Status	
Åland24	Consumer services	Broadcasting & entertainment	Mariehamn	2007	Private television station	P	A
Ålandstidningen	Consumer services	Publishing	Mariehamn	1891	Newspaper	P	A
Ålandstrafiken	Industrials	Marine transportation	Mariehamn	1969	Ferries, shipping	P	A
Bank of Åland	Financials	Banks	Mariehamn	1919	Commercial bank	P	A
Chips	Consumer goods	Food products	Mariehamn	1969	Snacks, part of Orkla Group (Norway)	P	A
Godby Shipping	Industrials	Marine transportation	Mariehamn	1973	Shipping	P	A
Nya Åland	Consumer services	Publishing	Mariehamn	1981	Newspaper	P	A
Paf	Consumer services	Gambling	Mariehamn	1966	Gambling and casinos	P	A
Posten Åland	Industrials	Delivery services	Mariehamn	1993	Postal services	S	A
TV Åland	Consumer services	Broadcasting & entertainment	Mariehamn	1984	Television	P	A

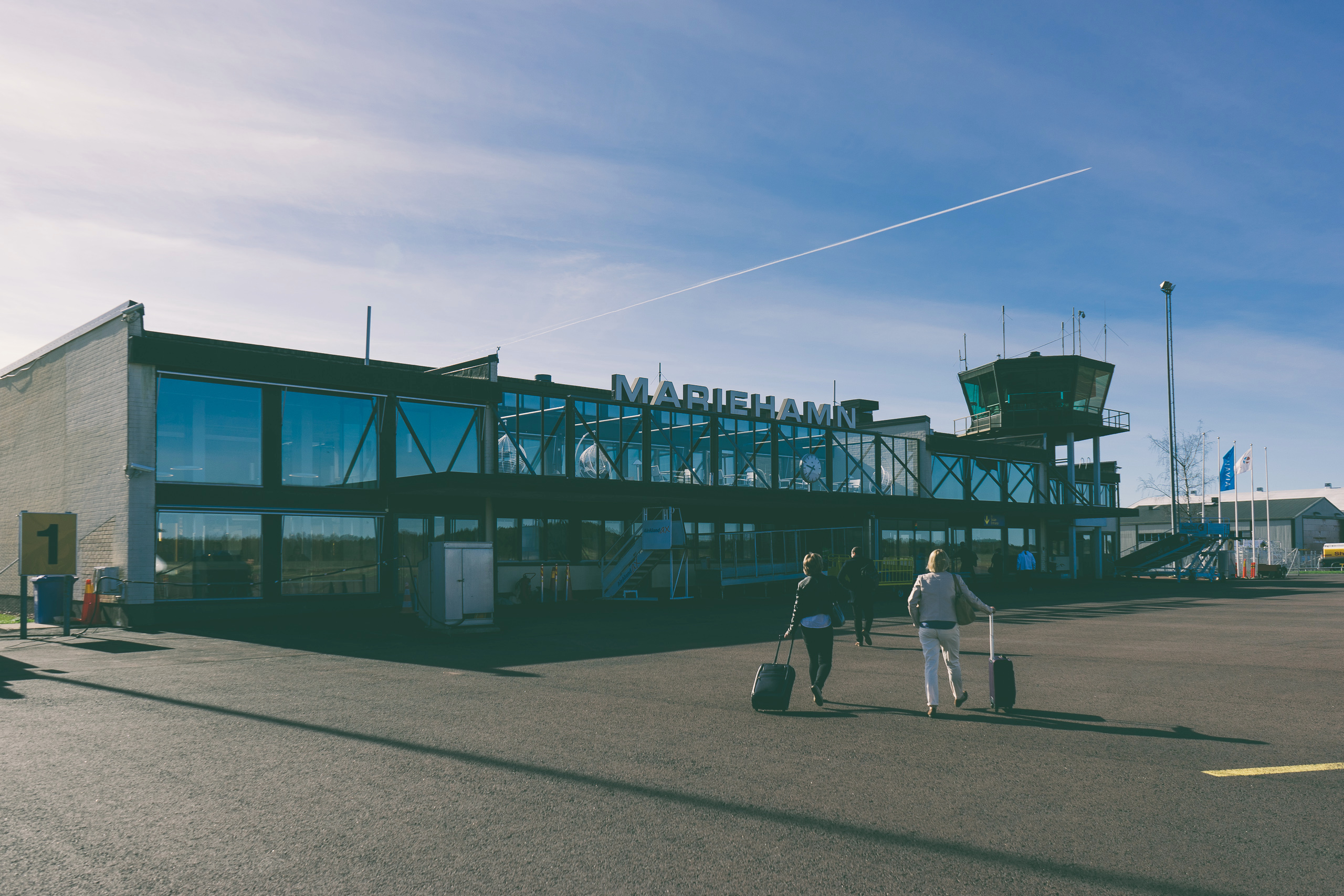
Airport in Mariehamn.

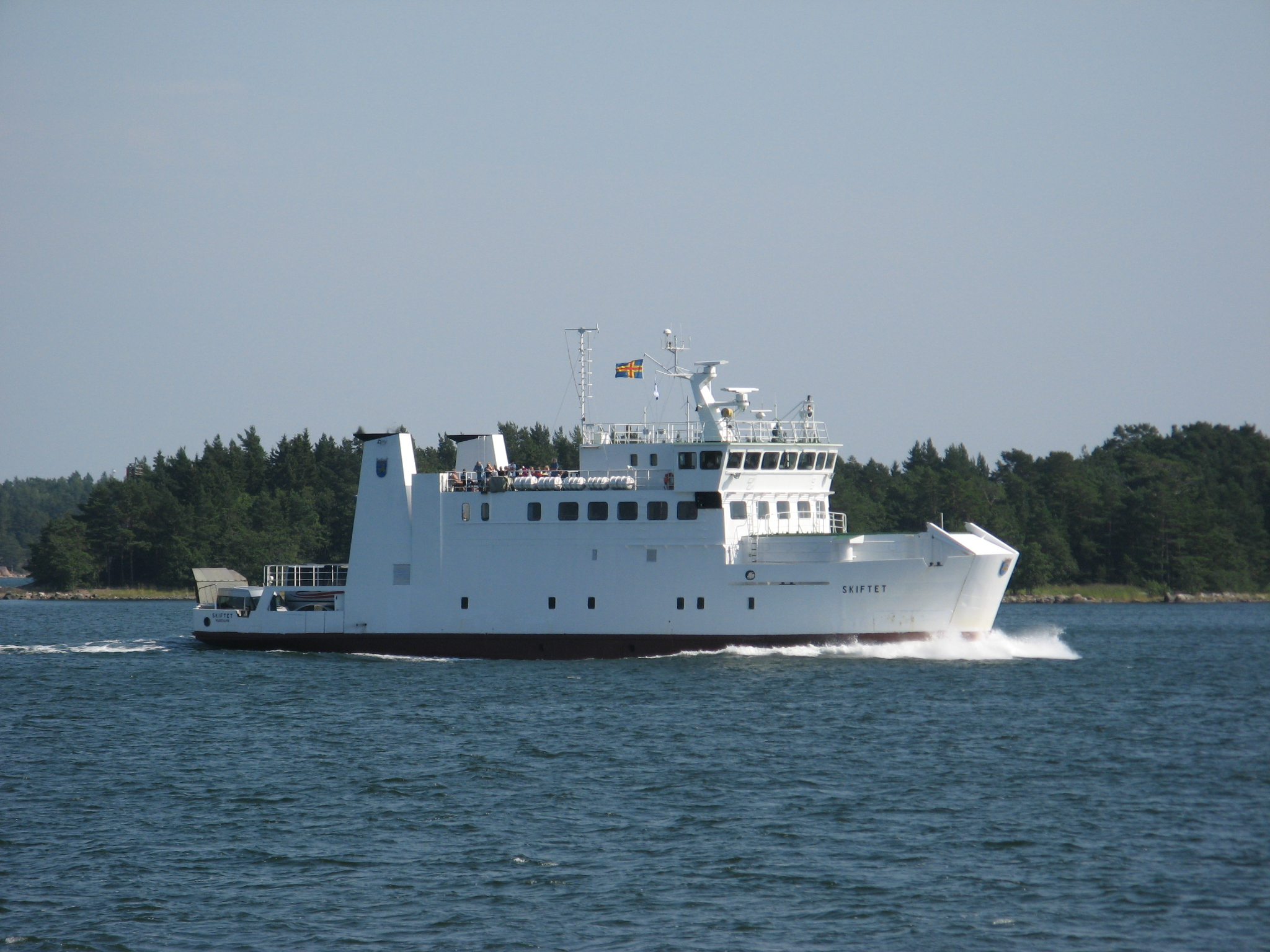
Ferry with Ålandstrafiken.

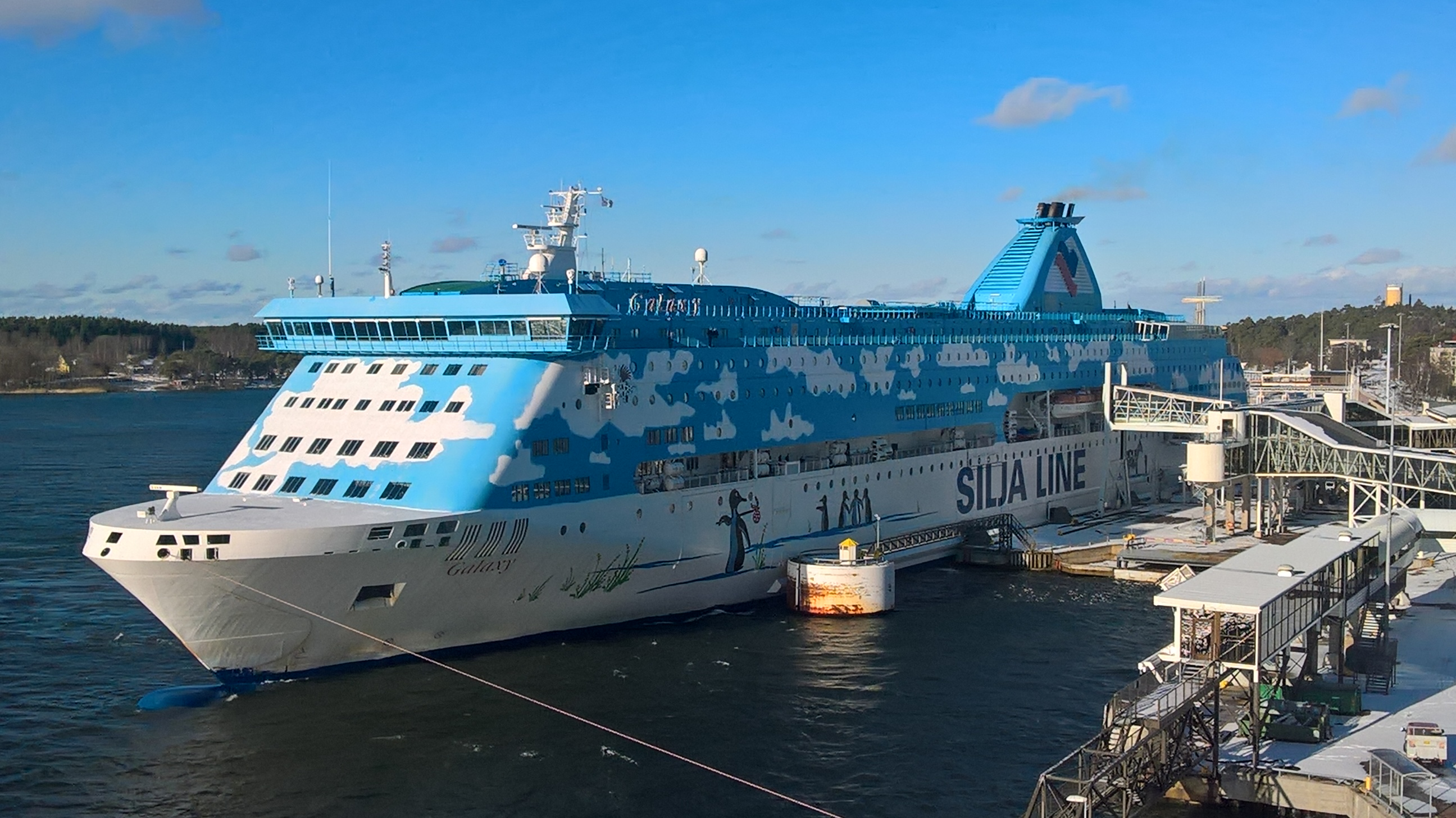
Cruise ship in the Mariehamn harbour.
