= Truu =

Family name

Origin
- Region of origin: Estonia

Truu is an Estonian surname (meaning "loyal"), and may refer to:

- Elmar Truu (born 1942), Estonian politician and sports pedagogue
- Meeli Truu (1946–2013), Estonian architect
- Silvia Truu (1922–1990), Estonian writer
