= Rocca al Mare =

Subdistrict of Tallinn, Estonia

Coordinates: 59°26′0.99″N 24°38′27.79″E

- Subdistrict of Tallinn
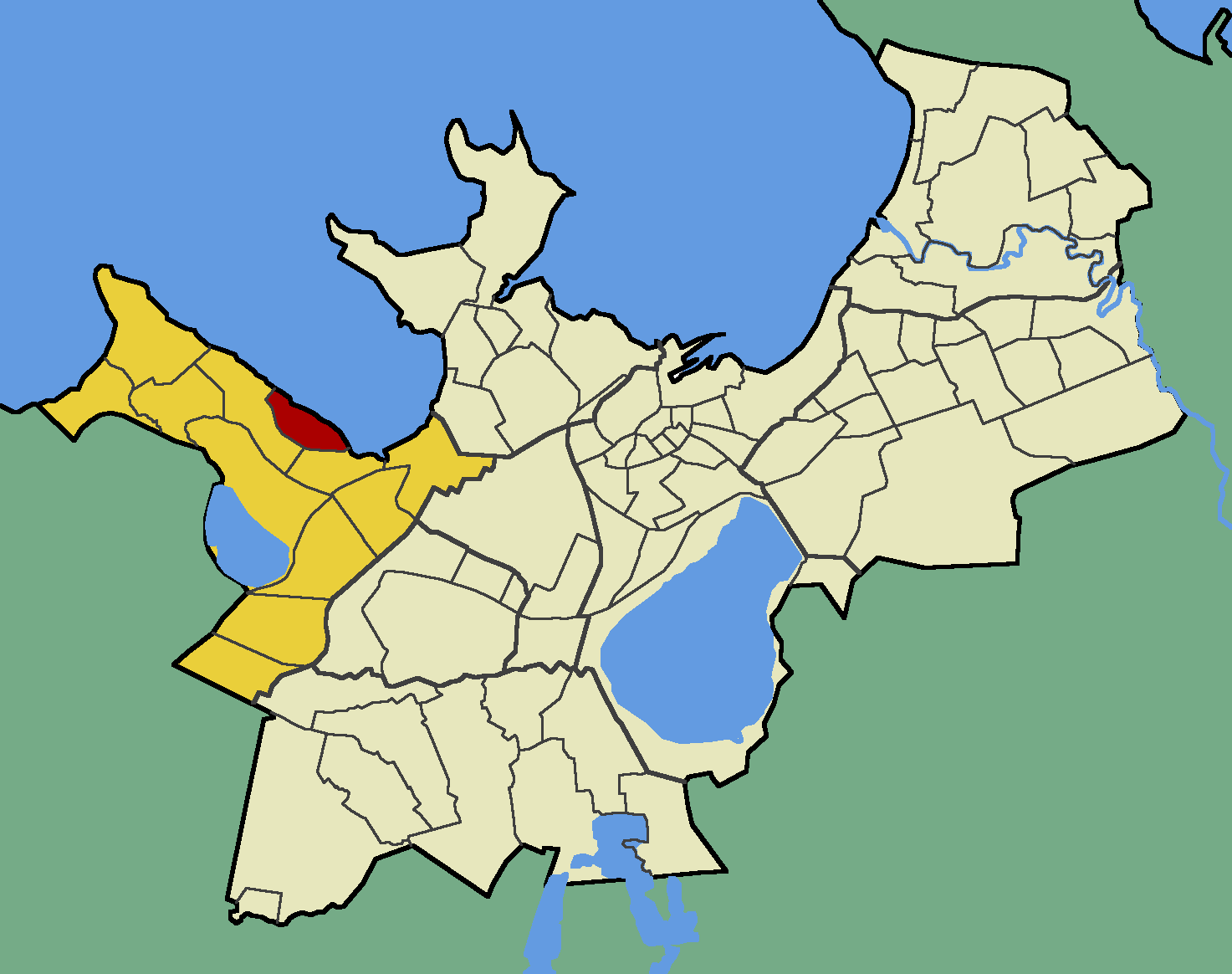
- Rocca al Mare within Haabersti District.
- Country: Estonia
- County: Harju County
- City: Tallinn
- District: Haabersti

Population (01.01.2014)
  - Total: 0

Rocca al Mare (Italian for "Fortress-by-the-Sea"; Estonian pronunciation: [ˈrokˈɑlˈmɑ:re]) is a subdistrict (Estonian: asum) in the district of Haabersti, Tallinn, the capital of Estonia. It is mostly covered by the Estonian Open Air Museum. Besides the museum there is also a private secondary school Rocca al Mare School located in the subdistrict.

Estonia's third largest shopping centre, Rocca al Mare Shopping Centre is located southeast of Rocca al Mare, officially located in the Haabersti subdistrict.

There are no residents living in the subdistrict.

== Gallery ==
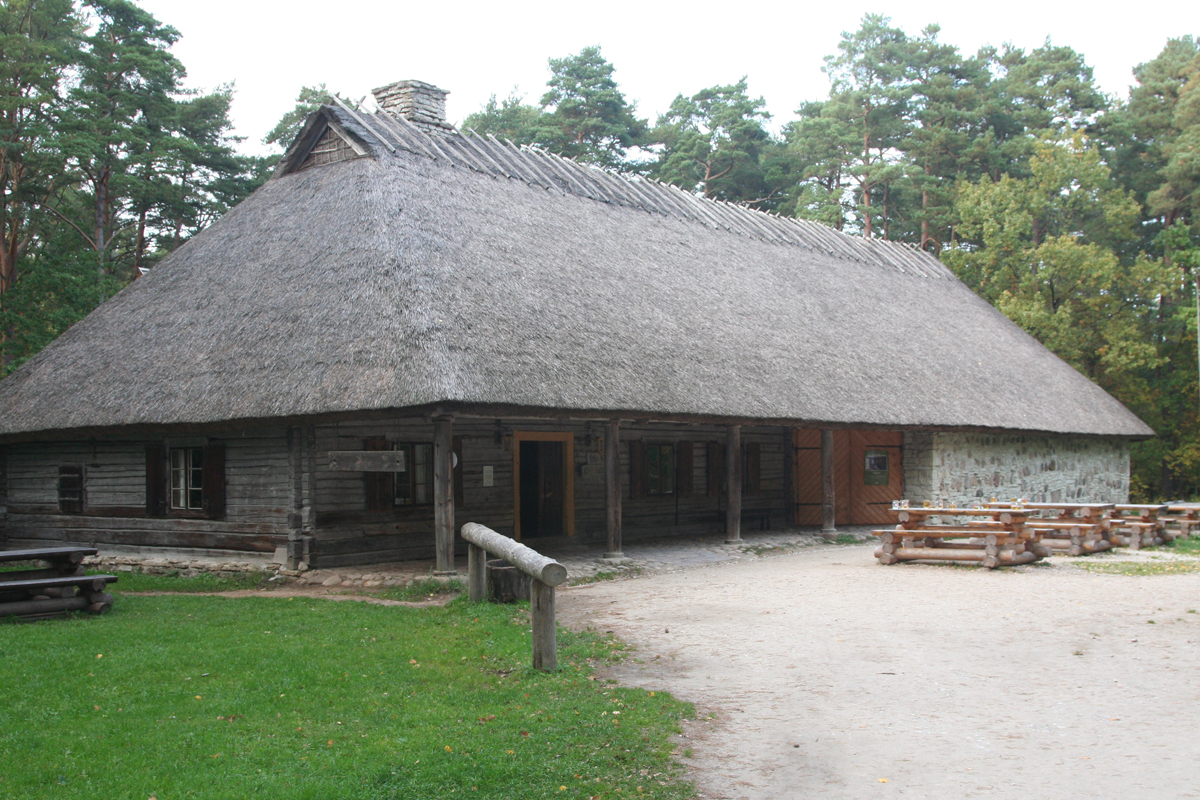
Kolu tavern

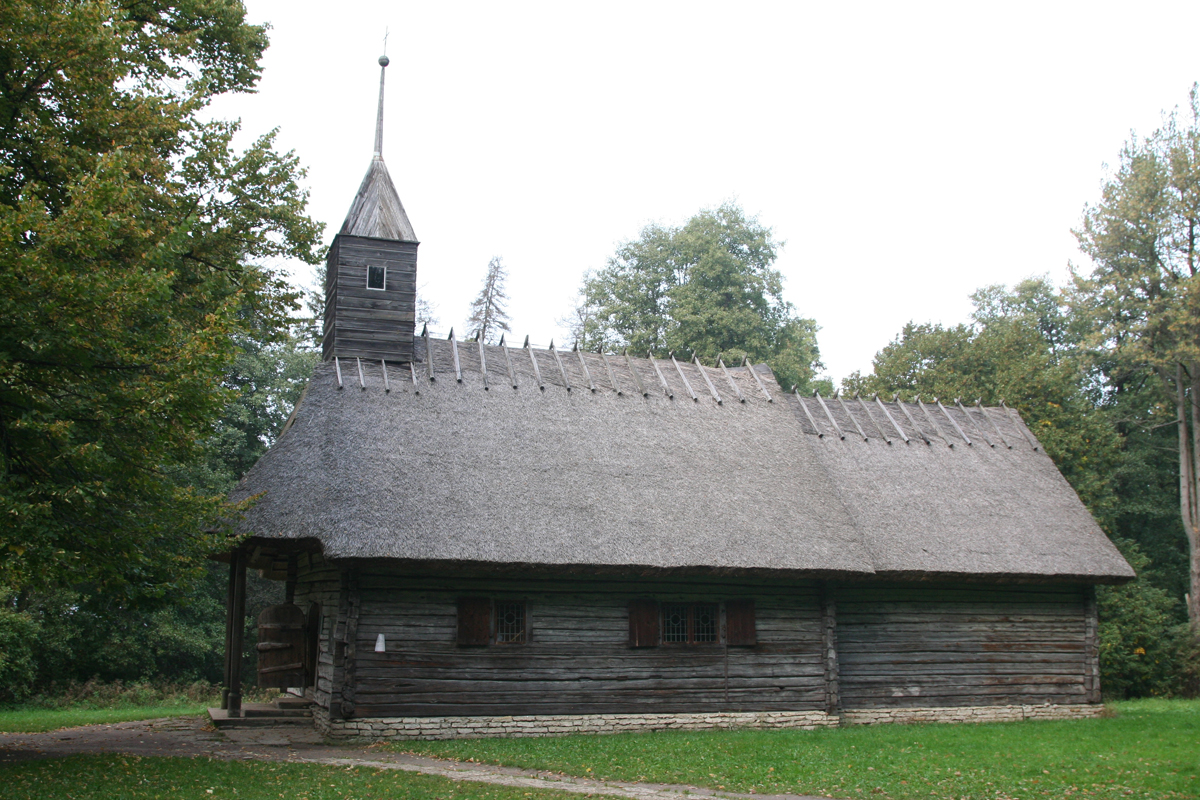
Sutlepa chapel

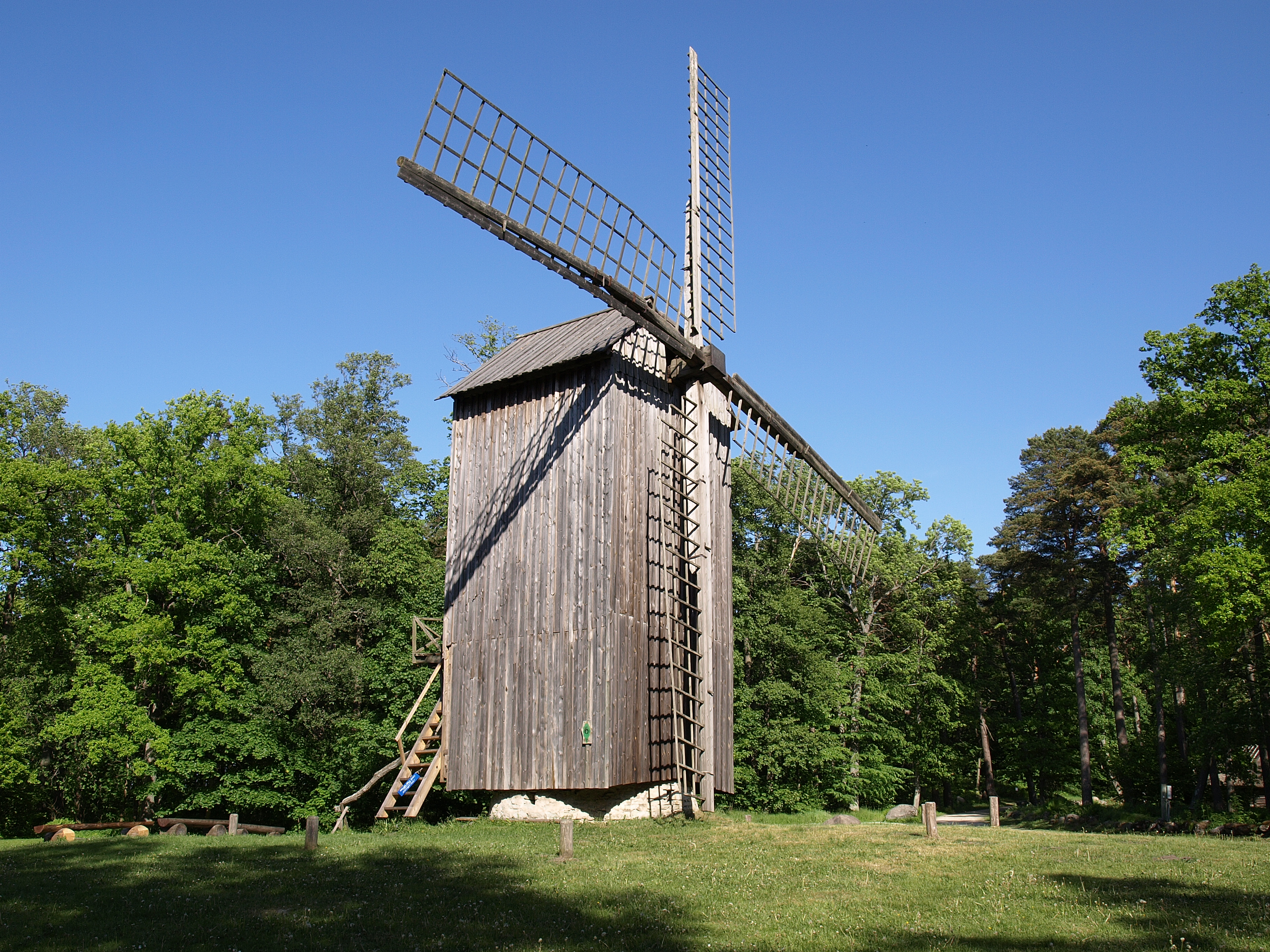
Ülendi windmill

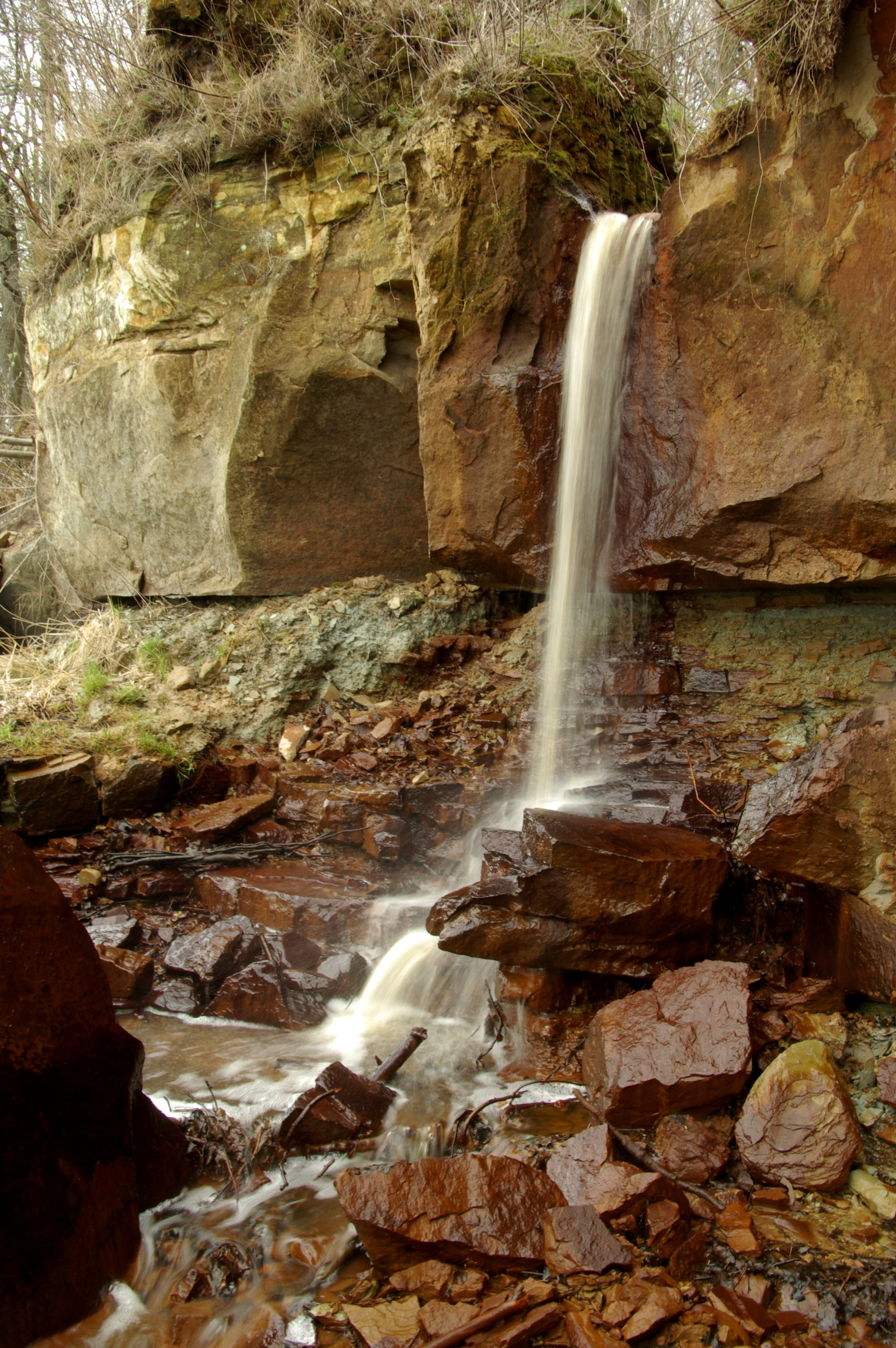
Rocca al Mare waterfall
