= Unibet Arena =

Indoor arena in Tallinn, Estonia

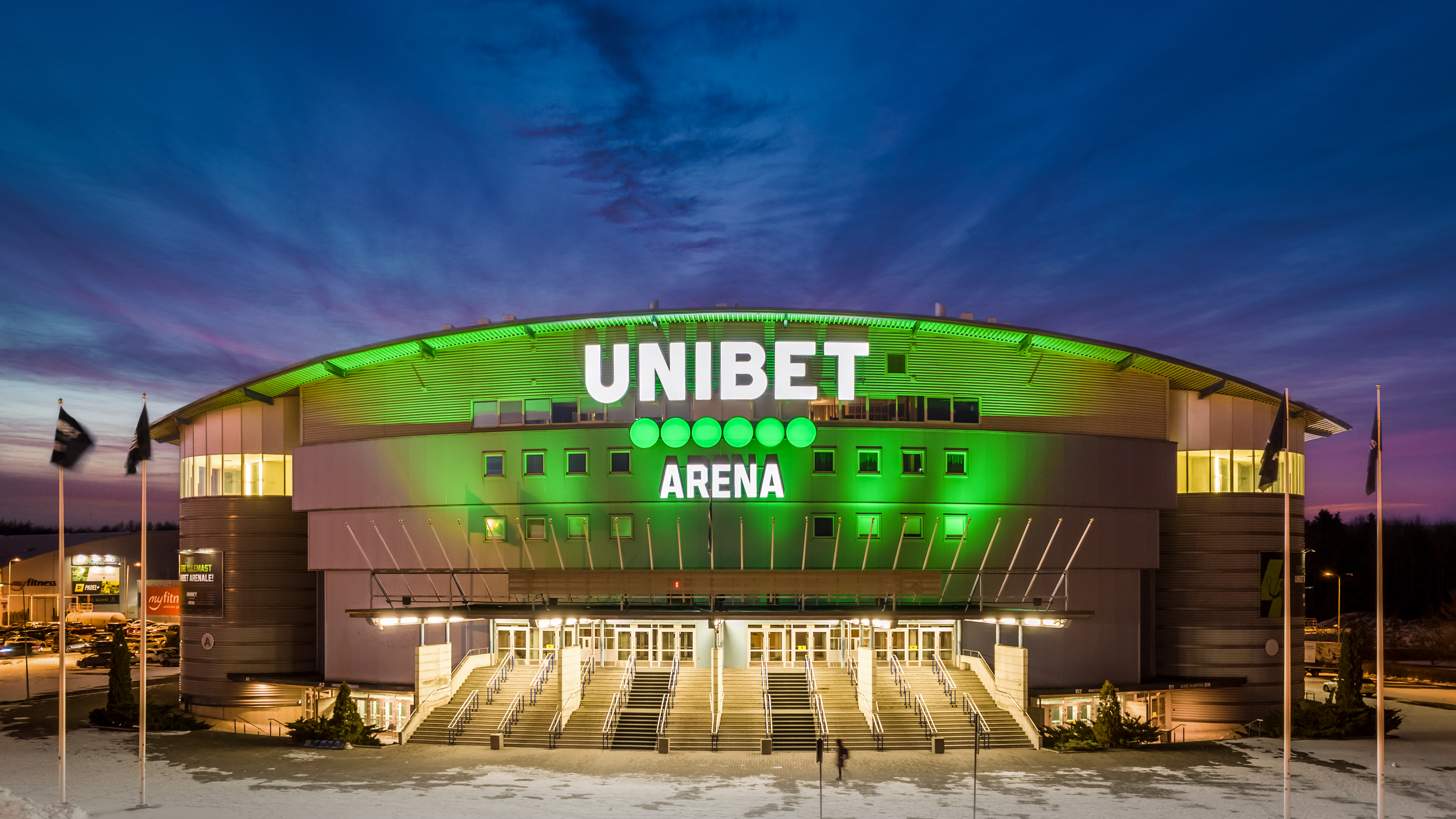
- Interactive map of Unibet Arena
- Former names: Saku Suurhall (2001–2022)
- Location: Haabersti, Tallinn, Estonia
- Coordinates: 59°25′34″N 24°38′51″E
- Owner: Marcel Vichmann
- Operator: OÜ Best Idea
- Capacity: Concerts: 10,000 (with standing); Basketball: 7,200 seated
- Surface: Versatile

Construction
- Groundbreaking: 7 July 2000
- Opened: November 2001
- Architects: Esa Viitanen (Pro Ark OY); Andres Kariste (North Project AS)
- Project manager: Lemminkäinen Eesti AS

Tenants
- BC Kalev (KML) (2001–present); Estonia men's national basketball team (2001–present)

Unibet Arena (named Saku Suurhall until 31 December 2022) is a multi-purpose indoor arena in the Haabersti subdistrict of the Estonian capital, Tallinn. Opened in November 2001, it is the largest multi-purpose hall in the country with around 7,200 seats but can hold up to 10,000 people.

It generally hosts basketball games, as well as sport competitions, trade fairs, corporate events and concerts. The name sponsor for the arena is the Swedish sports betting company Unibet and the venue is owned by businessman Marcel Vichmann via his company Best Idea OÜ. The renaming sparked controversy due to restrictions on gambling advertising in Estonia, but the Estonian Consumer Protection and Technical Regulatory Authority did not consider the new name a violation of advertising law.

== History ==
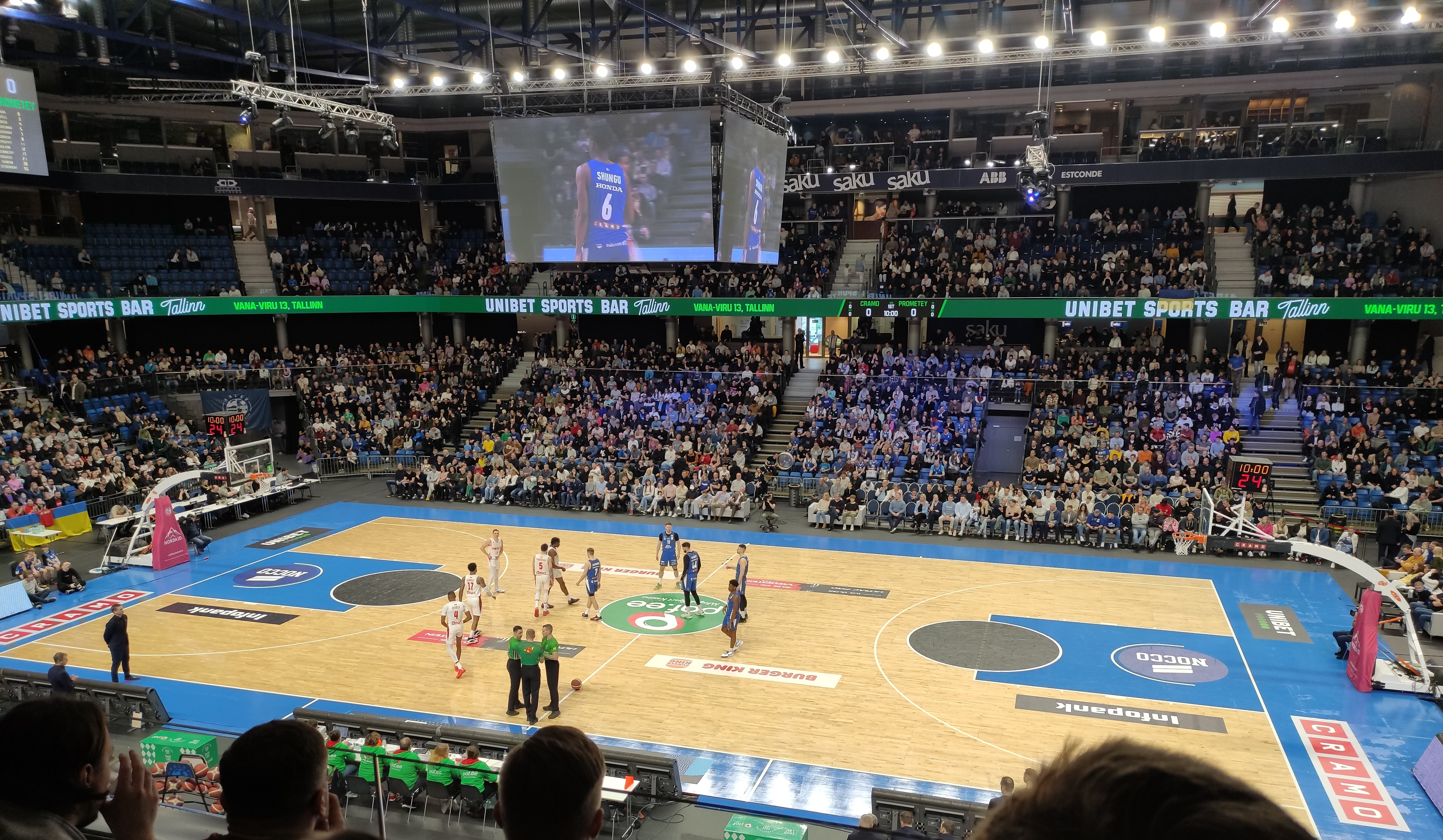
Arena during 2023–24 Latvian–Estonian Basketball League Final game

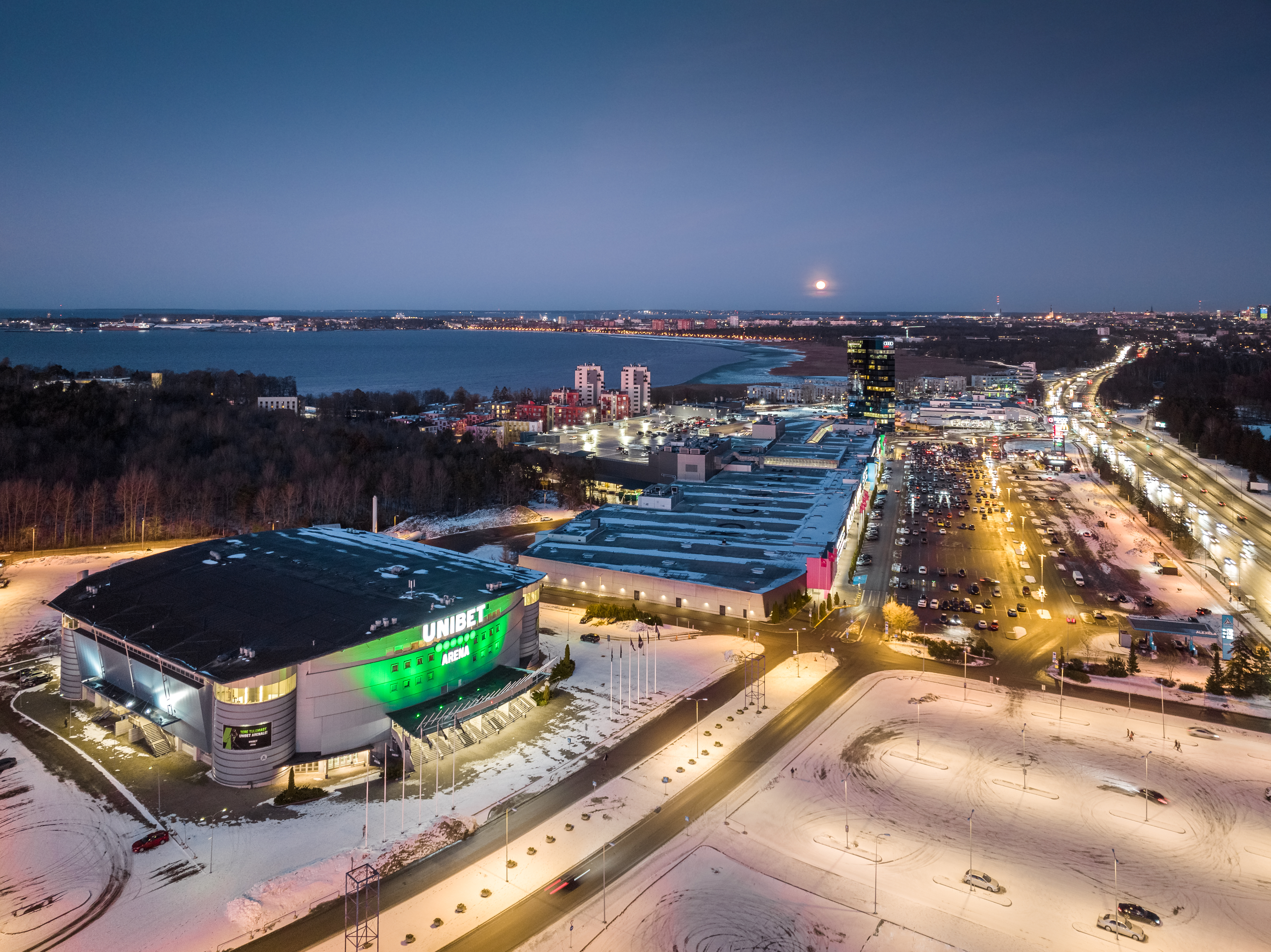
A view of Haabersti in 2023 with Unibet Arena and Rocca al Mare Shopping Centre.

Initial plans for the arena were announced in August 1999. Unibet Arena opened in November 2001. Since 2002, the arena is a member of the European Arenas Association (EAA). It was originally named after the Estonian brewery and soft drink company Saku.

Every year around 300 events take place in the hall, of which about 70 are major events. The first event in the hall was the Irish dance show Lord of the Dance. The basketball team BC Kalev/Cramo has been based at the arena since 2001.

In 2029, the arena is set to host the group phase matches of the FIBA EuroBasket.

== Construction and facilities ==
The area of the main hall is approximately 2,800 m²; its dimensions are 70 × 40 m, and the height is 16 m. The floor of the hall is made of concrete and can be covered with rubber mats or portable sports surfaces, including for basketball, volleyball, badminton and other team sports.

The total area of the complex, which is spread over four floors, exceeds 13,000 m². In addition to the main hall, the building houses rooms for seminars, receptions, and recreation; the large hall can be transformed into several smaller spaces using special curtains. The maximum capacity is 7,200 seats, of which 5,100 are fixed seats and 2,100 are portable.

== Past events ==
Some of the notable events, which took place in the arena are:

=== Music ===
- Eurovision Song Contest 2002
- Pirate Station Future (22 November 2008) & Immortal (18 December 2009)
- Eesti Laul final (2016–2022, 2025–2026)

=== Sports ===
- Tallinn International Horse Show (2002–present)
- Simpel Session (2004–present)
- 2002 and 2008 European Karate Championships
- 2010 European Figure Skating Championships
- 2013 European Cadet Judo Championships
- 2013 FIBA Europe Under-20 Championship
- 2015 Toyota Four Nations Cup
- 2021 Men's European Volleyball Championship (Pool D matches)
- 2023 Women's European Volleyball Championship (Pool D matches)
- 2024 European Junior Judo Championships
- 2025 Rhythmic Gymnastics European Championships

== Concerts ==
- Alice Cooper
- Alice in Chains
- Anne Veski
- Alla Pugacheva
- Avril Lavigne
- Backstreet Boys
- Bastille
- Bob Dylan
- Bring Me the Horizon
- Bryan Adams
- Cascada
- Chase & Status
- Chris Rea
- Cirque du Soleil
- Darren Hayes
- Deep Purple
- Def Leppard
- Demis Roussos
- Depeche Mode
- Disturbed
- Ed Sheeran
- Elton John
- Enrique Iglesias
- Flyleaf
- Foreigner
- Good Charlotte
- Gregorian
- Haloo Helsinki!
- Hurts
- Imagine Dragons
- Irina Allegrova
- Iron Maiden
- James Blunt
- Jamiroquai
- Joe Cocker
- Judas Priest
- Korn
- Kraftwerk
- Kylie Minogue
- Lenny Kravitz
- Limp Bizkit
- Lordi
- Louis Tomlinson
- Mamma Mia!
- Mariah Carey
- Marilyn Manson
- Mark Knopfler
- Massive Attack
- Metallica
- Michael Bublé
- Muse
- Nazareth
- Nelly
- Nero
- Nightwish
- OneRepublic
- Ozzy Osbourne
- Patricia Kaas
- Paul van Dyk
- Pet Shop Boys
- Phil Collins
- P!nk
- Placebo
- Plácido Domingo
- Rammstein
- R.E.M.
- Ray Charles
- REO Speedwagon
- Rihanna
- Roxette
- Ruslana
- Sade
- Sarah Brightman
- Scorpions
- Seal
- Simple Minds
- Simply Red
- Slipknot (band)
- Smokie
- Sting
- Styx
- Suzi Quatro
- t.A.T.u.
- The Bravery
- The Prodigy
- The Sweet
- Thirty Seconds To Mars
- Tiësto
- Tom Jones
- Toto Cutugno
- Underworld
- Vanessa-Mae
- Vanilla Ninja
- Vaya Con Dios
- Whitesnake
- Within Temptation
- Yes
- Zemfira

== See also ==
- List of indoor arenas in Estonia

| Preceded by Parken Stadium; Copenhagen | Eurovision Song Contest; Venue; 2002 | Succeeded by Skonto Hall; Riga |
