= Álvaro Esquivel =

Costa Rican BMX rider

Personal information
- Born: 16 April 1998 (age 26); Ciudad Neily, Puntarenas, Costa Rica
- Occupation: Professional BMX Athlete

Sport
- Sport: Freestyle BMX, Dirt jumping, Flatland BMX, Mountain bike trials
- Event: BMX Copa Latina 2022

Álvaro Esquivel (born 16 April 1998) is a Costa Rican professional BMX cyclist. Esquivel was born in Ciudad Neily, but he grew up in Vito Coto Brus, a commune in the province of Puntarenas.

Esquivel made his professional debut at the national level in 2019. He has won several Best Trick trophies, including one at the O Marisquiño festival in Spain, and two at the BMX Street Station tournament in France. Esquivel reached the final at the Simple Session in Estonia, placing 15th.

He has also represented Costa Rica in international competitions, and in 2022 became champion of the pro street category at the Copa Latina 2022 held in Mexico.

== Contest history ==
=== 2022 ===
- 1st BMX Copa Latina in Mexico.
