= Tornimäe Building Complex =

Skyscraper in Tallinn

- Interactive map of the Tornimäe Building Complex area

General information
- Location: Tornimäe 7, Tallinn, Estonia
- Coordinates: 59°25′59″N 24°45′39″E
- Completed: 2007

Height
- Height: 117 m (384 ft)

Technical details
- Floor count: 30

Design and construction
- Architect: Meeli Truu

Tornimäe Building Complex is a two-building complex skyscraper in Tallinn, Estonia.

One building is designed for the hotel (Swissôtel Tallinn) and the other part is built for the apartments. The apartment building has 181 apartments. The height of the hotel is 117 m and the height of the apartment building is some centimetres shorter.

The complex was built from 2004 to 2007. The complex was designed by Meeli Truu.

== Gallery ==
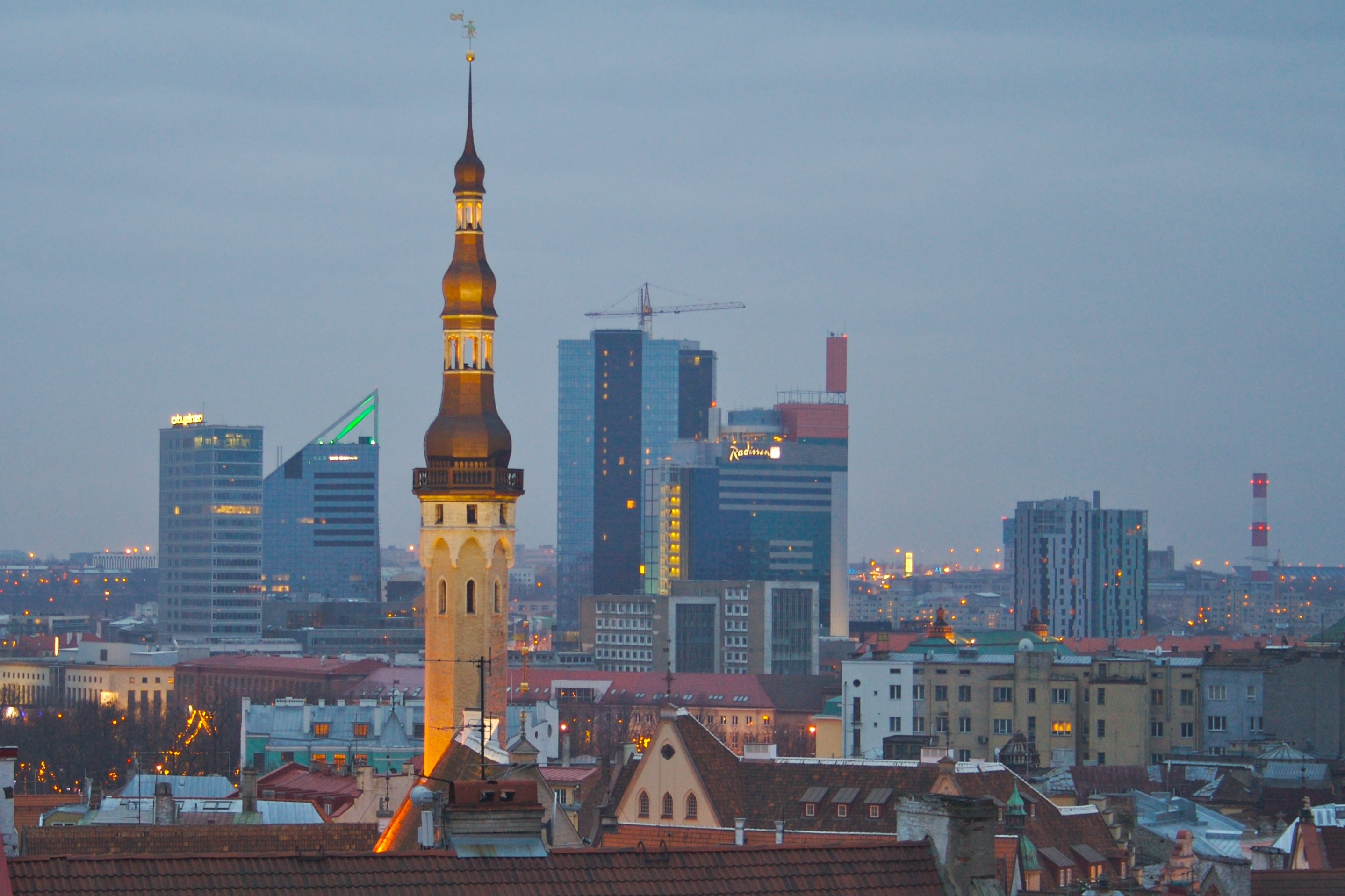
Tornimäe as seen from the old town in December 2006

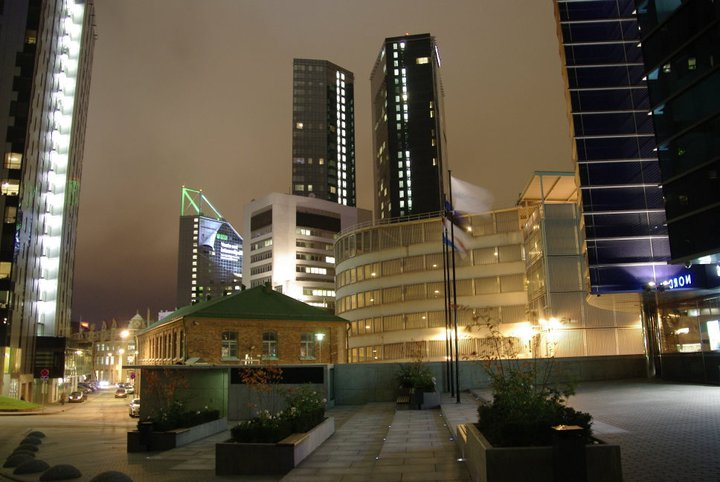
Tornimäe Twin Towers during the night

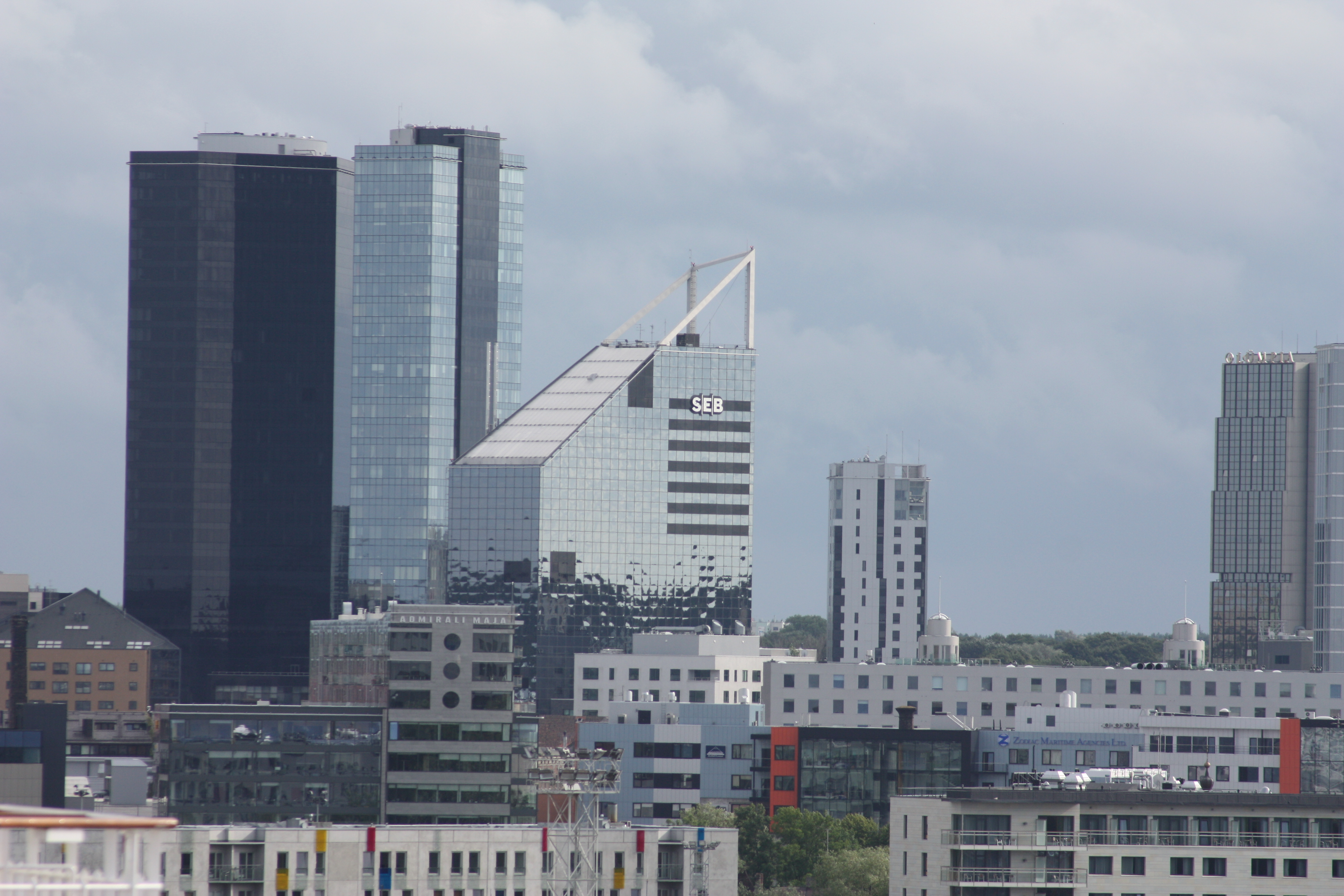
Tornimäe Twin Towers (on the left) in 2009

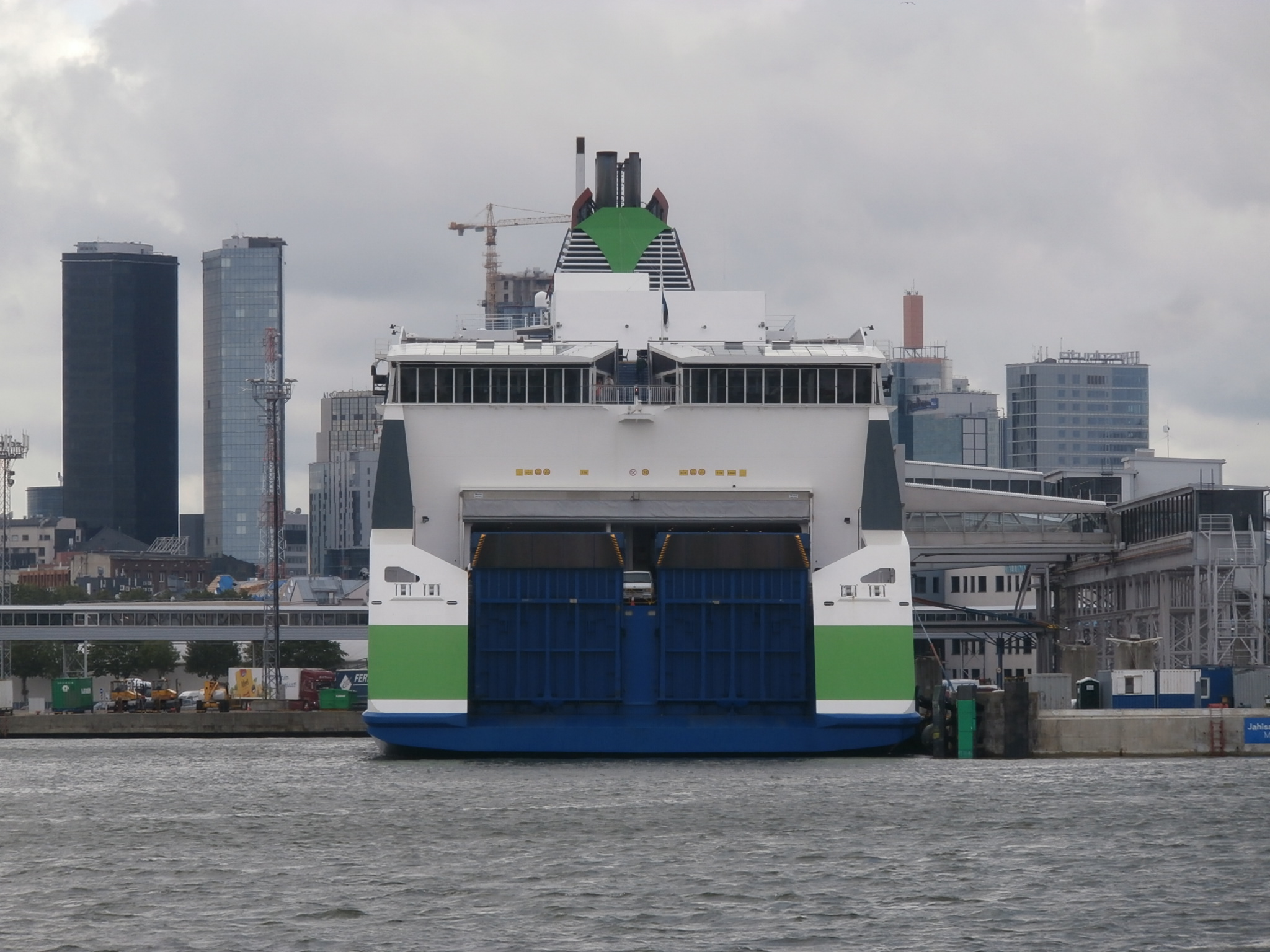
Twin towers Swissôtel Tallinn and Tornimäe 7 (on the left), as seen from the Port of Tallinn in 2017

Tornimäe 7, between Maakri Torn and Skyon
