= Swissôtel Tallinn =

Hotel in Tallinn, Estonia

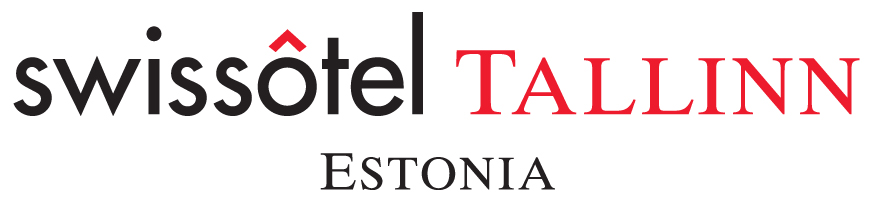

- Swissôtel Tallinn during the evening in 2020 Location in Estonia
- Location in Tallinn

General information
- Location: Tallinn, Tornimäe 3, Estonia
- Coordinates: 59°25′58.48″N 24°45′41.44″E
- Opening: 2007-12-10
- Operator: Swissôtel Hotels & Resorts

Height
- Height: 117 metres (384 ft)

Technical details
- Floor count: 30

Design and construction
- Architect: Meeli Truu
- Architecture firm: Nord Projekt AS
- Developer: EKE Invest AS
- Structural engineer: Nord Projekt AS
- Services engineer: Veisman Projekt
- Main contractor: Lemminkäinen Eesti AS

Other information
- Number of rooms: 238
- Number of restaurants: 3
- Parking: underground

Website
- www.swissotel.com

Swissôtel Tallinn, known as the Tomimae commercial centre during construction, is a hotel located in Tallinn, the capital of Estonia. At a height of 117 metres (384 ft), it is among the tallest buildings in the Baltic States.

It is managed by Swissôtel Hotels & Resorts and is part of the Tornimäe complex, located in the heart of Tallinn, which consists of the hotel and a residential building.

The hotel internal structure is formed by 238 rooms and suites, 3 restaurants, 3 bars, a spa, and a fitness center.

== History ==
The contract to build this hotel was signed in 2004. Construction took over 3 years to complete. The ceremonial opening of the hotel took place on December 10, 2007.

The Tornimäe Towers were designed by Meeli Truu from Nord Projekt AS. The interior decorator was Meelis Press Architects. The Swissôtel Tallinn became a member of the Estonian Hotel and Restaurant Association in January 2010.

== Gallery ==
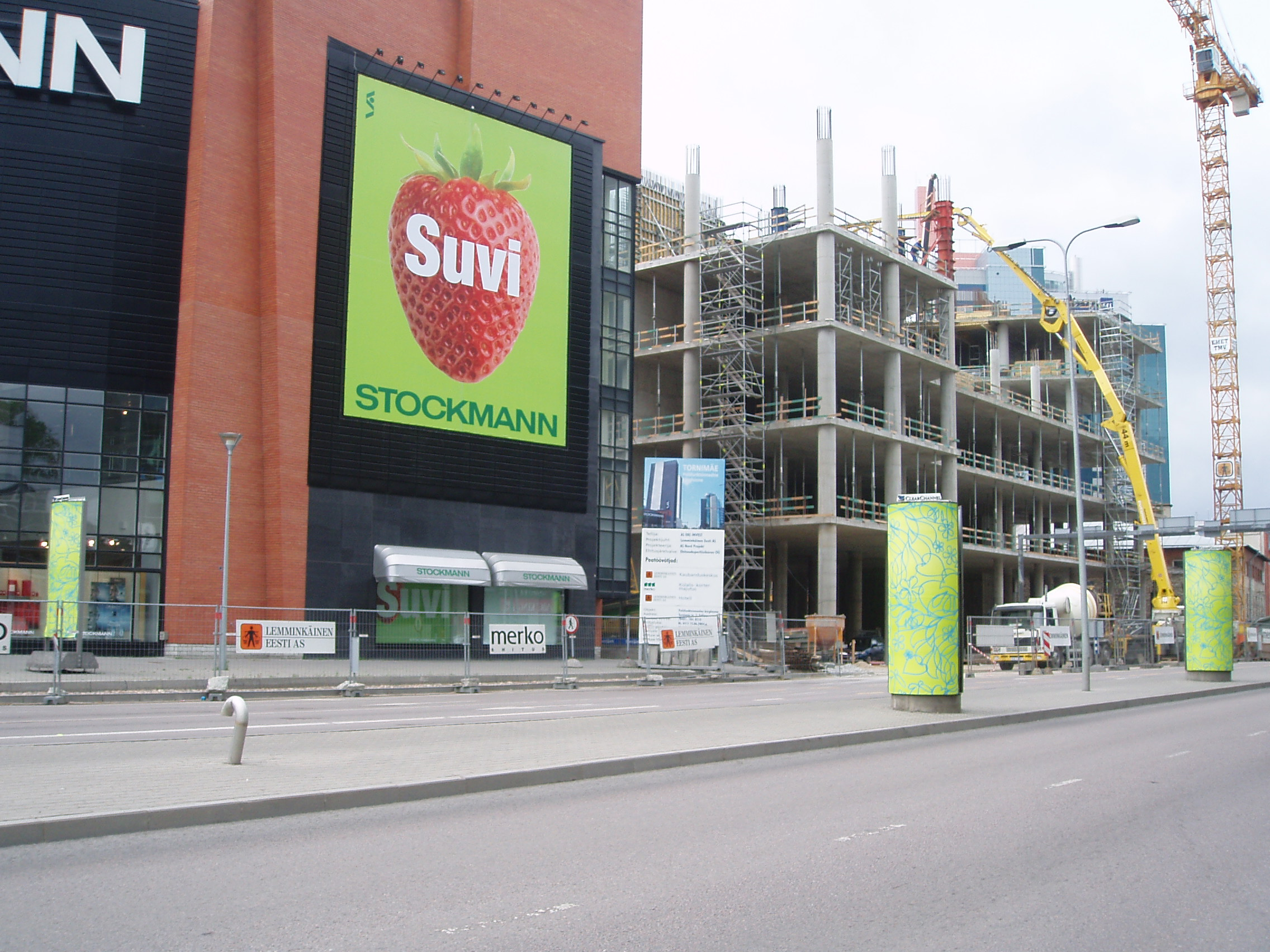
Swissôtel Tallinn during Construction 4 June 2005

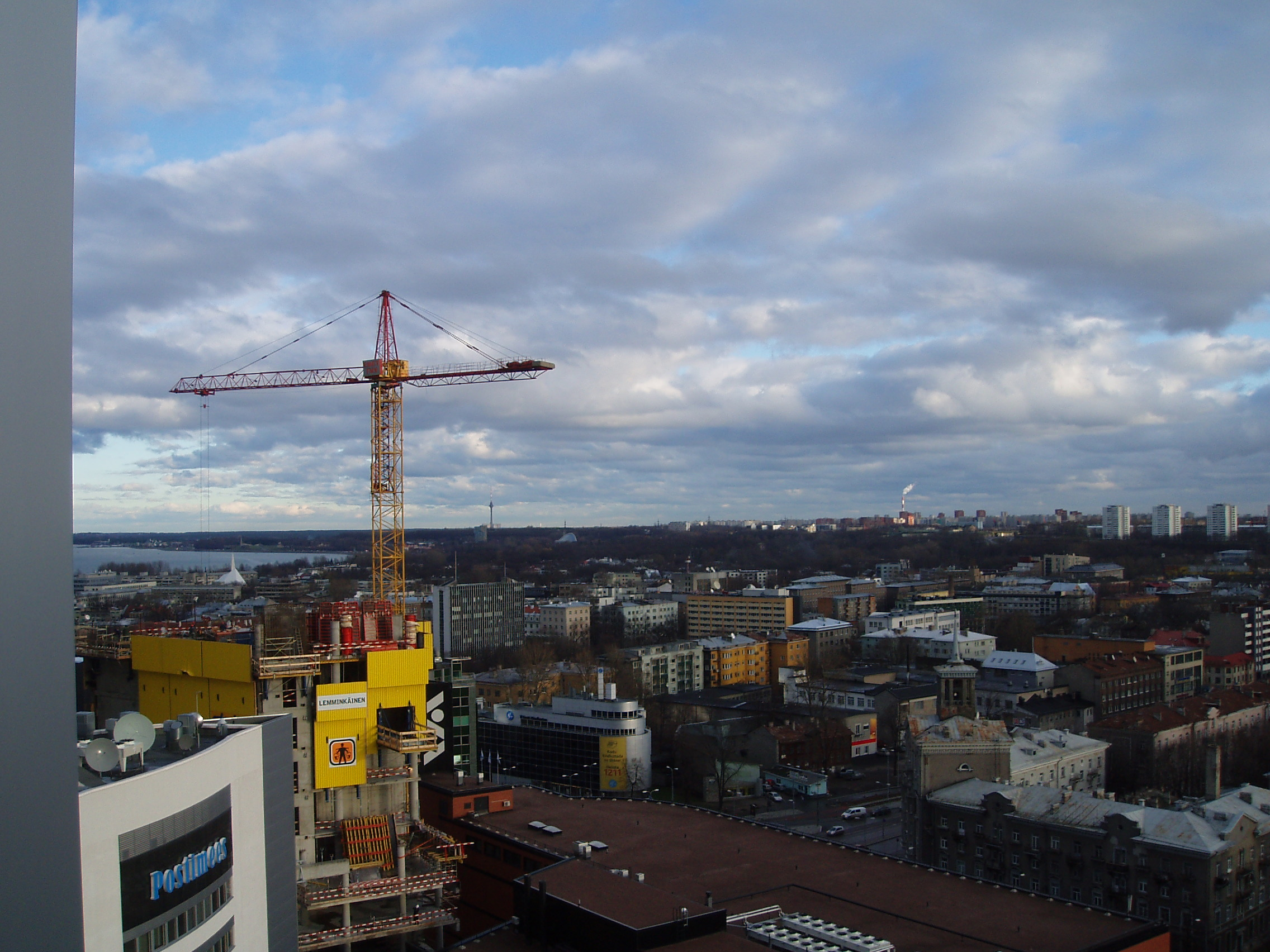
Swissôtel Tallinn Under Construction in November 2005

Swissôtel Tallinn in the rain in 2022

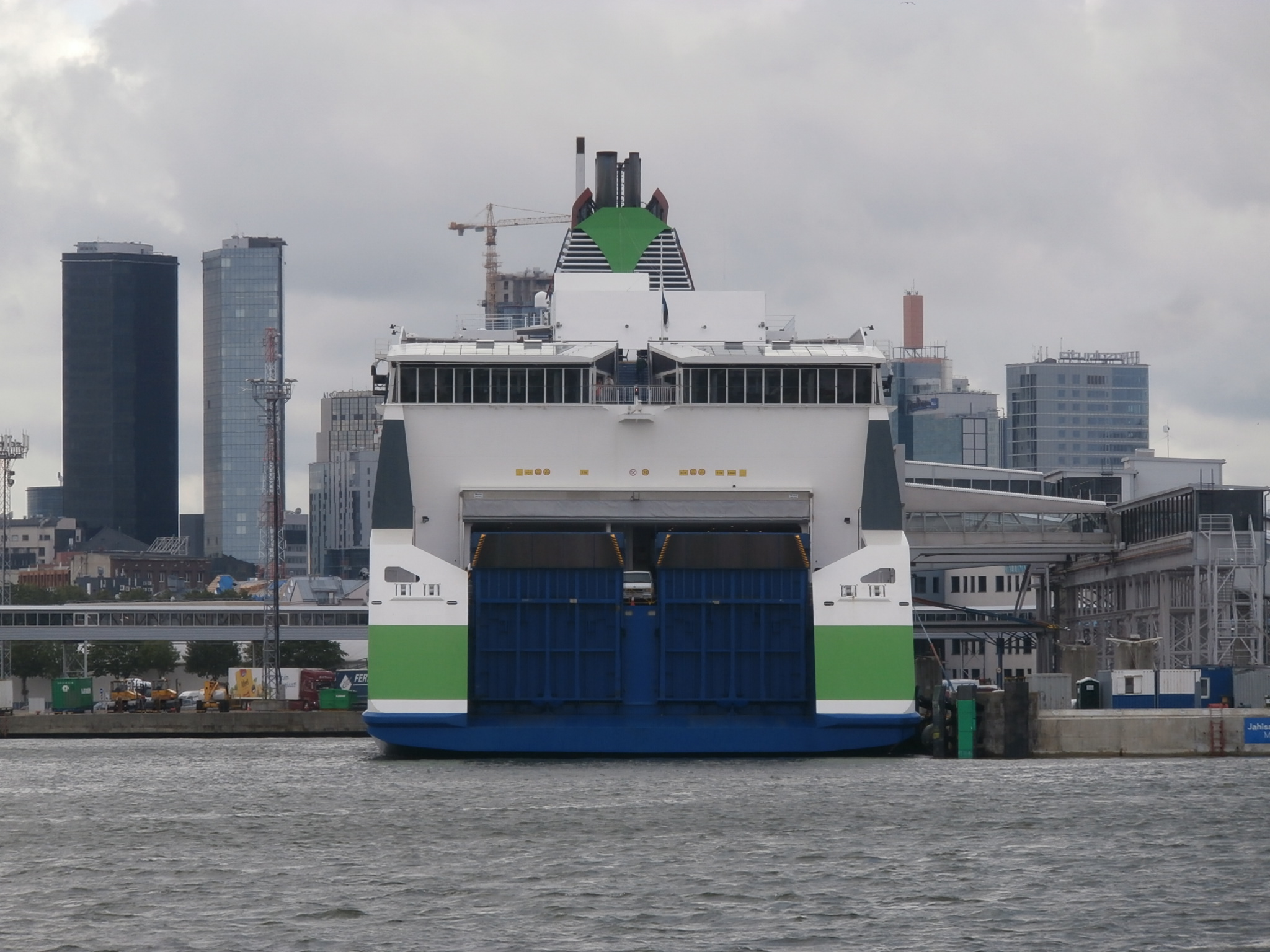
Twin towers Swissôtel Tallinn and Tornimäe 7 (on the left), as seen from the Port of Tallinn in 2017

The towers as seen from the street level

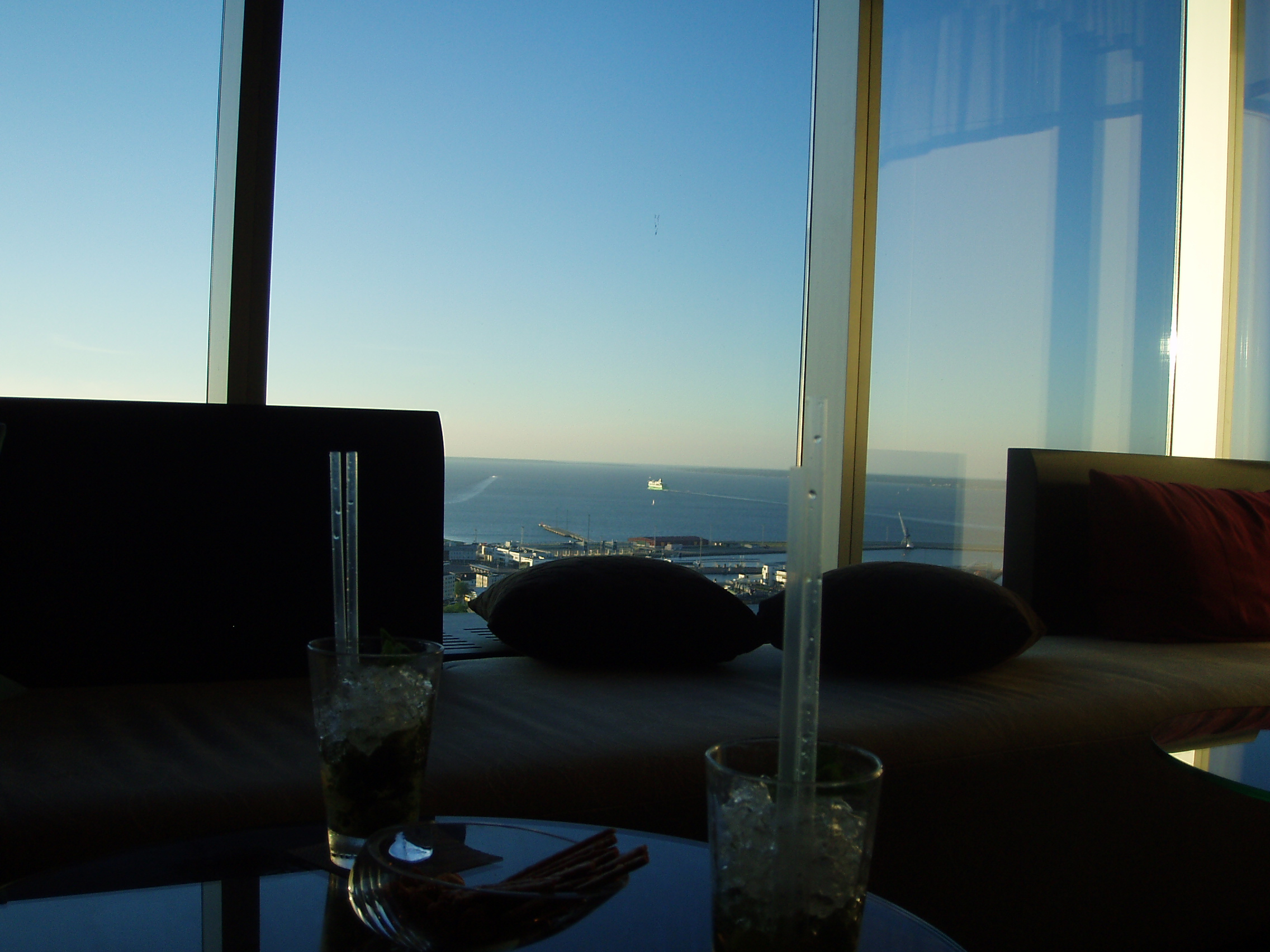
View from Swissôtel Tallinn

== See also ==
- List of tallest structures in Estonia
- List of tallest buildings in Estonia
