= Simple Session =

International extreme sport event in Estonia

Simple Session (formerly known as Simpel Session) is an international extreme sports event taking place annually in Estonia.

As the event has grown by years, it has also branched outside of Estonia with its Simple Summer Session series, with 2010 and 2011 events taking place in Helsinki, Finland and 2017 and 2018 in Riga, Latvia.

== History ==
=== 2000 ===
The first event, then named Pepsi Street Challenge, was held in the year 2000 in newly opened outdoor Simpel Skatepark, Tähtvere, Tartu. In the first ever year, the event featured BMX and skateboarding disciplines, including inline skating, BMX vert and dirt. The first event cost only about 10,000 krones (about 640 euros) to organize.

=== 2001 ===
As a result of the success of the first year, the event took place in the following year as well. Now renamed to Simpel Session due to the sponsorship deal with EMT's Simpel brand, the event was extended to two days and featured BMX flatland in addition to BMX dirt, BMX street/park, inline park, inline vert and skateboarding street/park disciplines.

=== 2004 ===
In 2004 the event moved to an indoor location at Saku Suurhall in Tallinn which allowed the event to be held during wintertime in the subsequent years.

It was also the first year Red Bull teamed up with the event and built a special competition course for the event.

=== 2005 ===
As part of the sponsorship deal with EMT, the event was renamed to POP! Session for subsequent two years, named after EMT's other brand POP!.

=== 2007 ===
In 2007, Nate Wessel, who has designed skateparks for Woodward and X Games, designed and built the skatepark for the event.

In addition to the main event in January, a secondary event, Simpel Session Summer Splash, took place for the first time in August.

=== 2009 ===
2009 rendition also featured another summertime event - the Simpel Summer Session 09 at the Freedom Square in Tallinn.

=== 2010 ===
Simpel Session celebrated its 10 year anniversary event.

In comparison to the first ever event, the 2010 event cost about 4 million krones (about 256,410 euros).

The 2010 summertime event was the first year the event branched outside of Estonia. It took place in Helsinki, Finland and was held on the 13th of August.

=== 2011 ===
Summer Session of 2011 took place Helsinki once again on the 20th of August.

=== 2012 ===
As the longtime sponsorship deal with EMT ended, the competition's name was changed to Simple Session and it was registered as an international trademark.

By then Simple Session had become one of the most popular BMX and skate events of the year, resulting in wide media coverage reaching millions of unique viewers.

=== 2013 ===
For the 2013 event Simple Session partnered up with Microsoft, which allowed the event to be broadcast in full HD quality for the first time.

=== 2017 ===
2017 saw the return of the Simple Summer Session as the event took place in Riga, Latvia.

=== 2018 ===
Summer Session of 2018 was held in Riga, Latvia again in a newly built concrete skatepark.

=== 2021 ===
Simple Session 21 returns as a summertime festival, held in Põhjala factory, Tallinn, on August 20–21.

=== 2024 ===
Simple Session 24 returned to its hometown of Tartu on August 24–25. The event took place in the Tartu Comb Factory, a former industrial site that has been transformed into an event venue. Simple Session was also a part of the European Capital of Culture Tartu 2024 main program.
