= Haabersti (subdistrict) =

Subdistrict of Tallinn, Estonia

Coordinates: 59°25′39.19″N 24°39′18.75″E

- Subdistrict of Tallinn
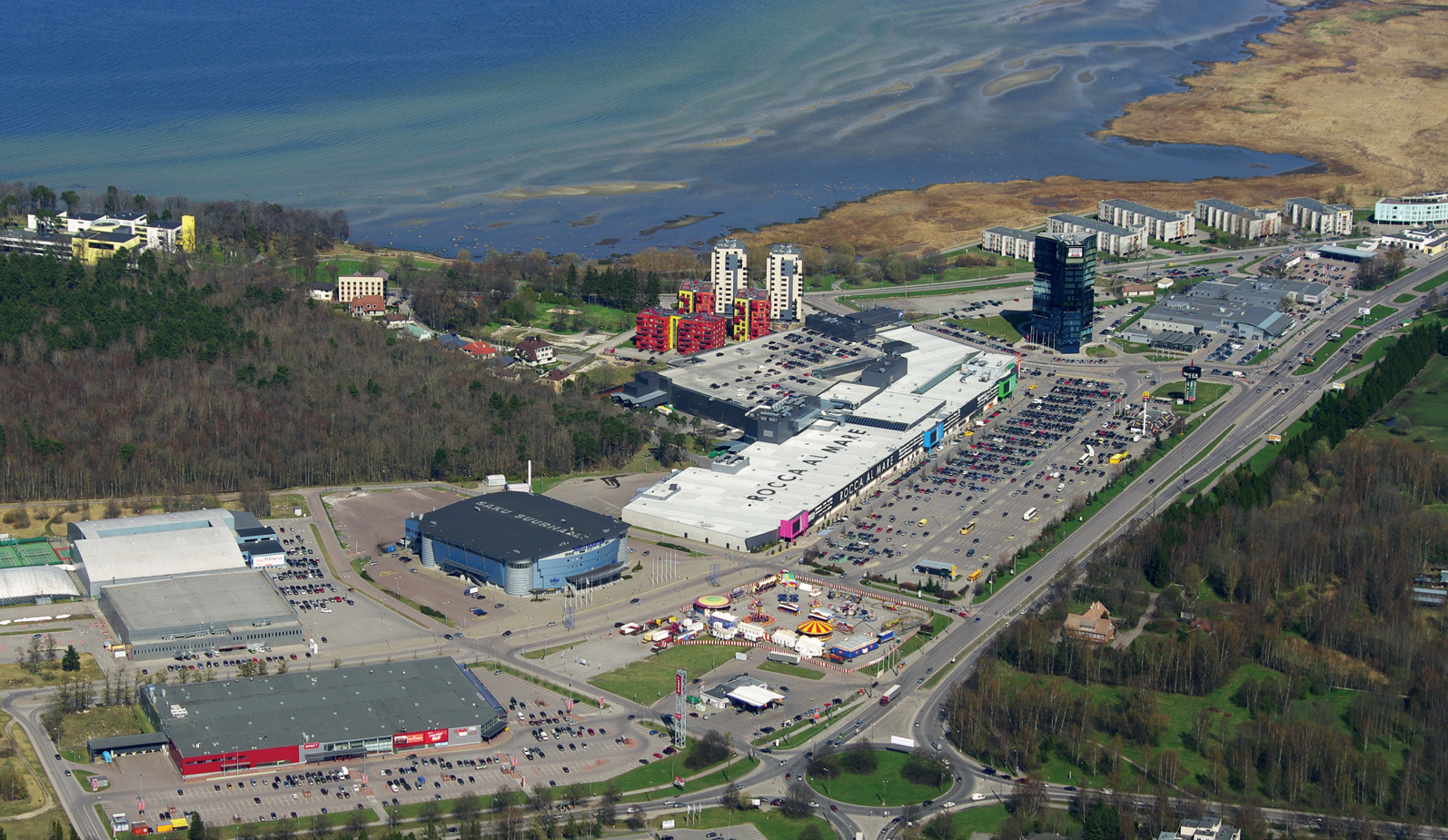

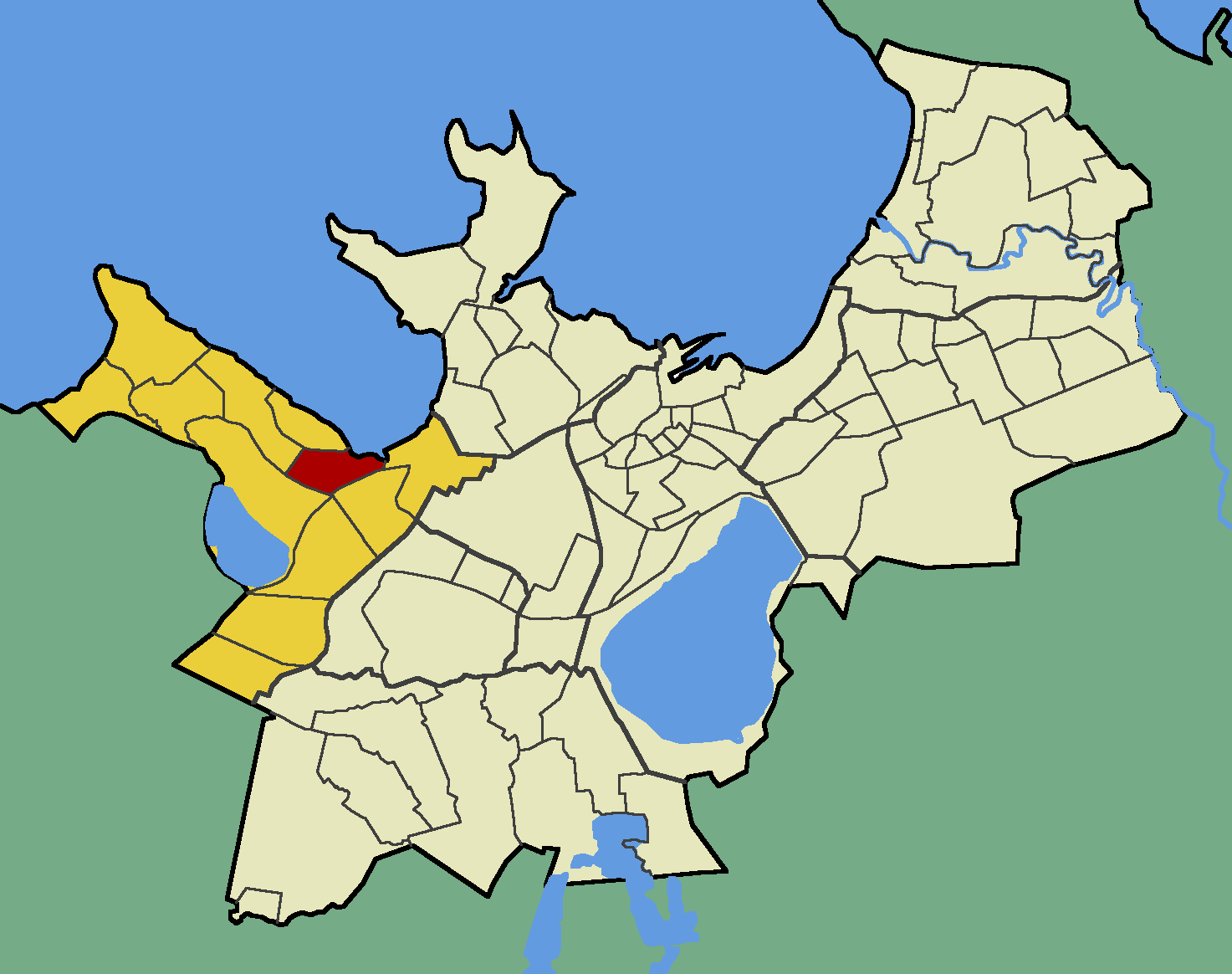
- Haabersti subdistrict within Haabersti District.
- Country: Estonia
- County: Harju County
- City: Tallinn
- District: Haabersti

Population (01.01.2015)
  - Total: 714

Haabersti (German: Habers) is a subdistrict (Estonian: asum) in the district of Haabersti, Tallinn, the capital of Estonia. It has a population of 714 (as of 1 January 2015).

== Gallery ==
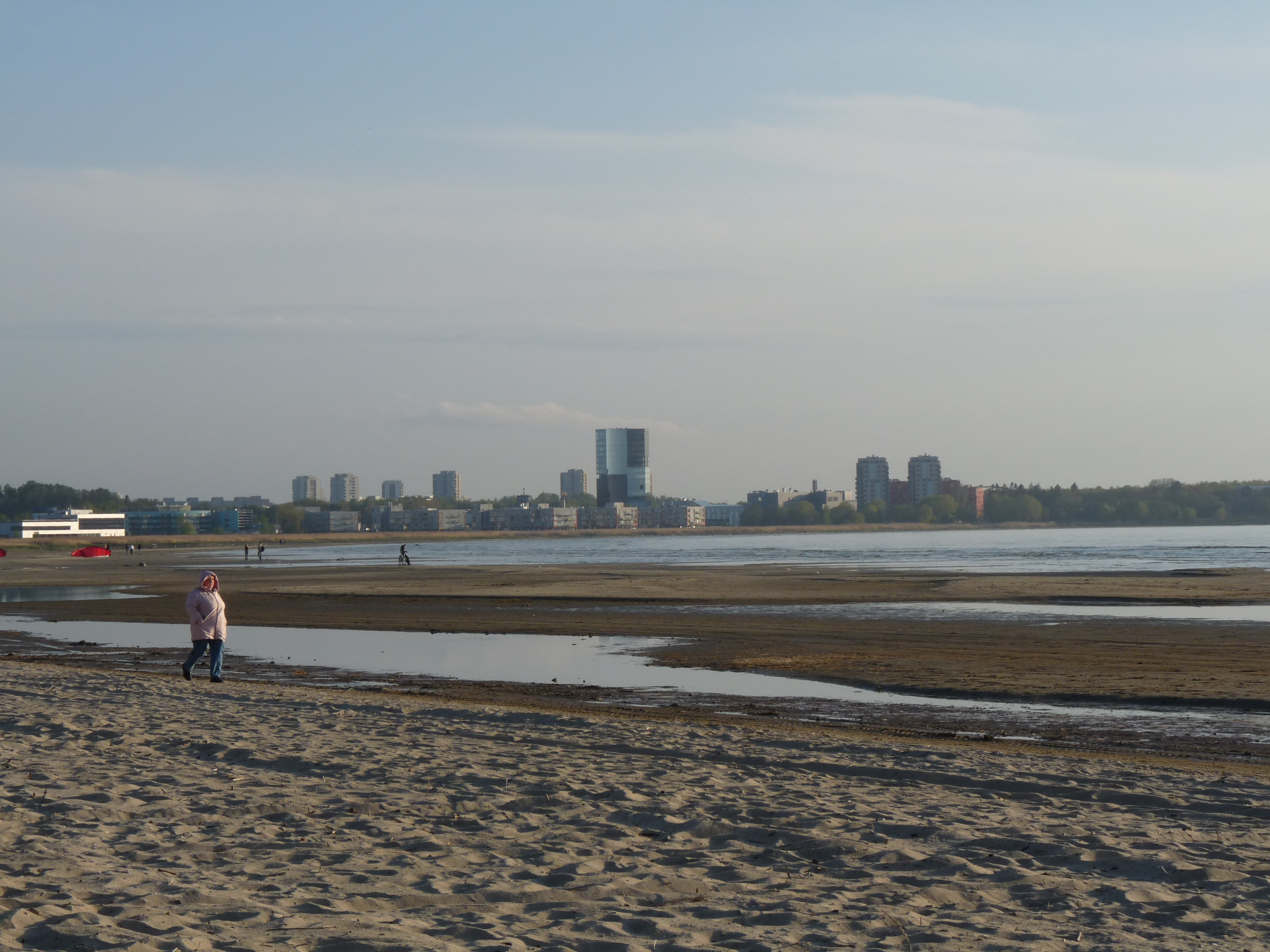
Haabersti seen from Stroomi beach.

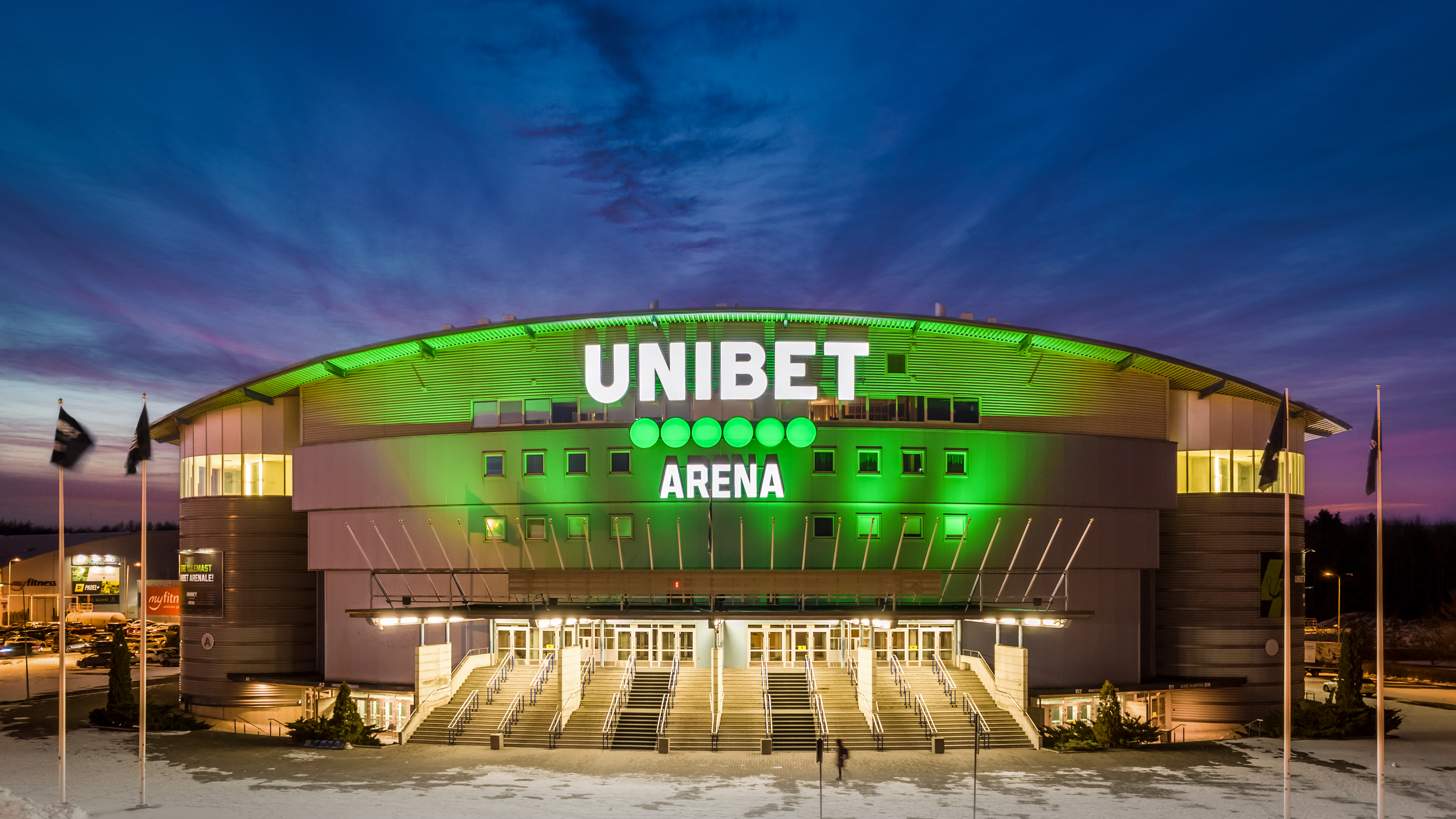
Unibet Arena

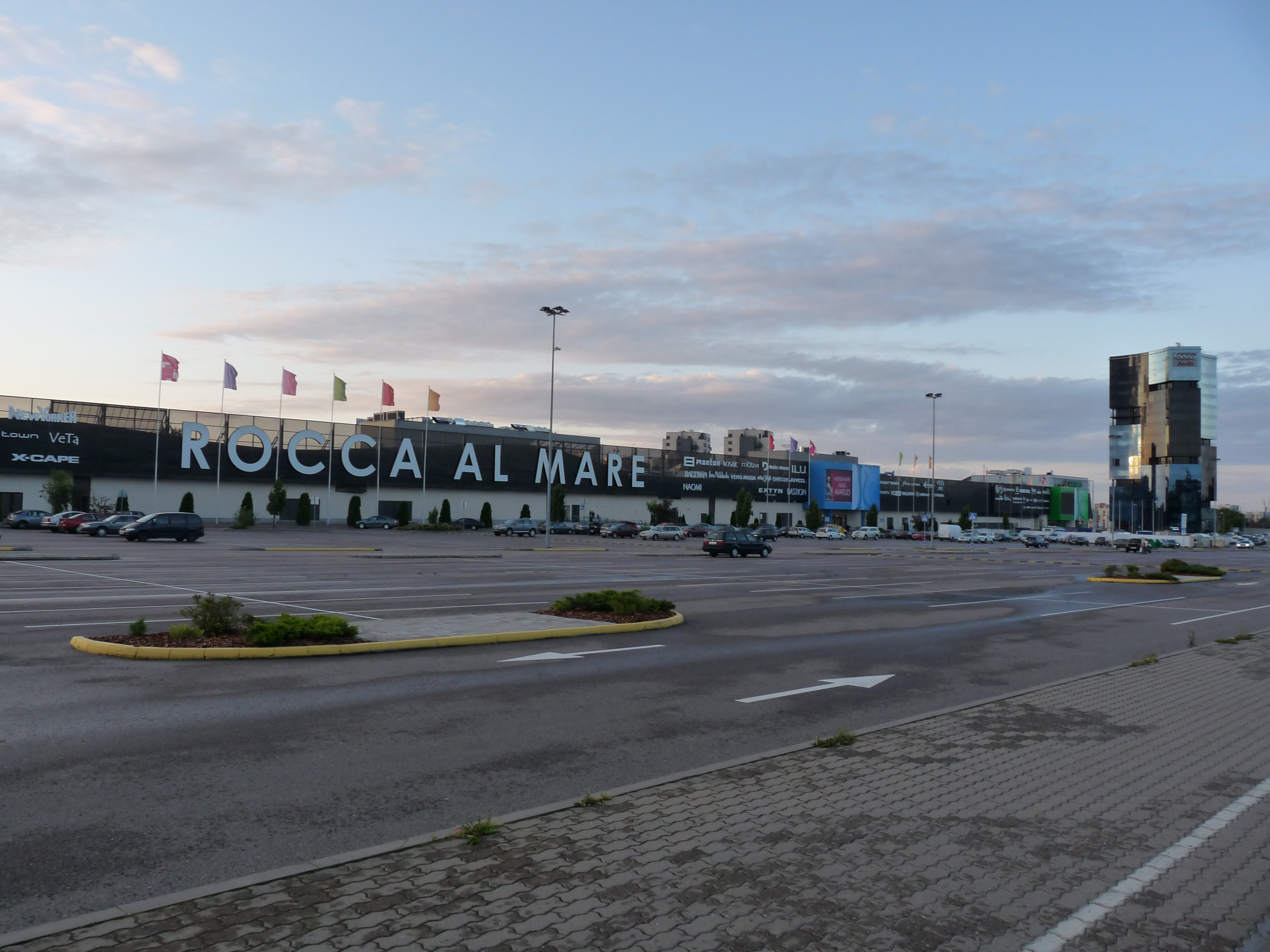
Rocca al Mare Shopping Center

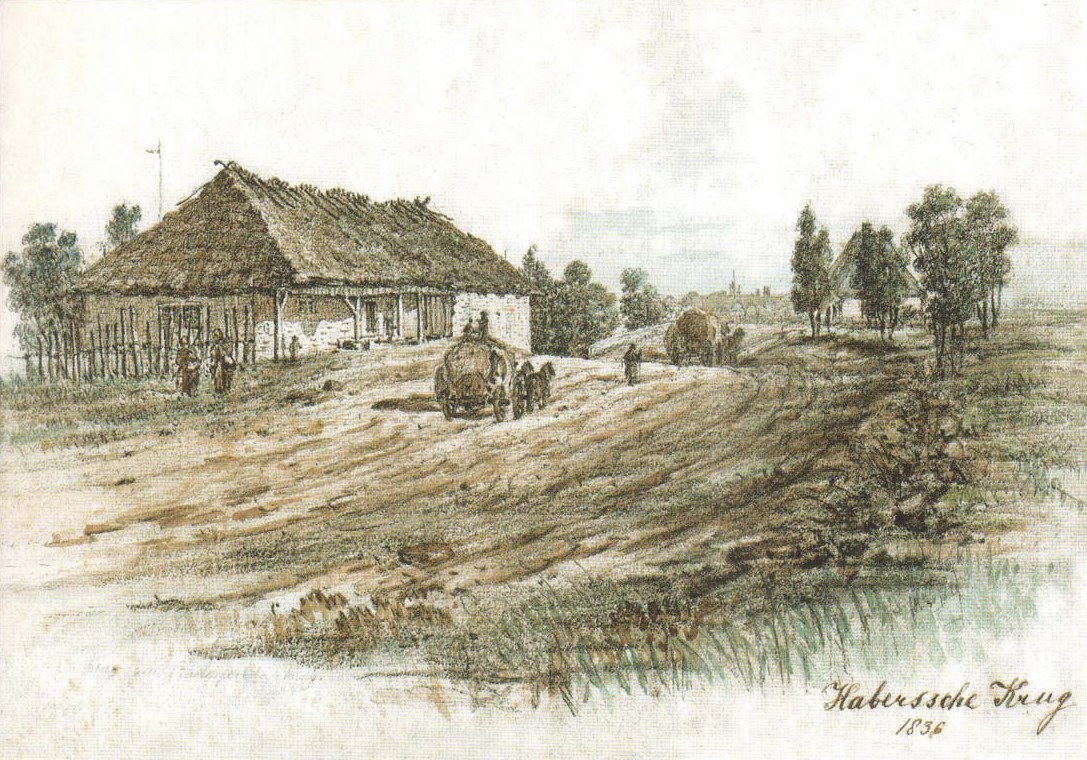
Haabersti tavern (Haabersti kõrts) in about 1836.
