= Silvia Truu =

Estonian children's writer

Silvia Truu (full name Silvia Astrid Truu, until 1936 Koch, until 1941 Koht; 16 December 1922 – 5 May 1990) was an Estonian children's writer.

She was born in Paldiski. She worked at several newspapers' offices: Rahva Hääl, Noorte Hääl and Nõukogude Naine.

From 1965 she was a professional writer. Since 1973 she was a member of Estonian Writers' Union.

She died in Tallinn, and she is buried at Forest Cemetery. She had two daughters – architect Meeli Truu and sports teacher Tuuli-Ann Kivikangur (born Truu).

== Works ==
- "Ühed targad mõlemad" (1956)
- "Murra" (1959)
- "Silja, päikesekiir ja maailm" (1967)
- "Kuu aega täiskasvanu" (1968)
- "Saa nüüd neist inimestest aru" (1970)
- "Pilvede kõrval toas" (1973)
- "Jeekim" (1974)
- "Peidus pool" (1977)
- "Oma suguvõsa Aadam" (1985)
- "Südamel ei ole kortse" (1987)
