= Meeli Truu =

Estonian architect

- Born: 27 April 1946
- Died: 7 August 2013 (aged 67)
- Occupation: Architect
- Parent: Silvia Truu (mother)
- Practice: Associated architectural firm[s]
- Buildings: Swissôtel Tallinn; Rocca al Mare Shopping Centre

Meeli Truu (27 April 1946 — 7 August 2013) was an Estonian architect.

She designed the Swissôtel Tallinn and the Rocca al Mare Shopping Centre.

== Gallery ==
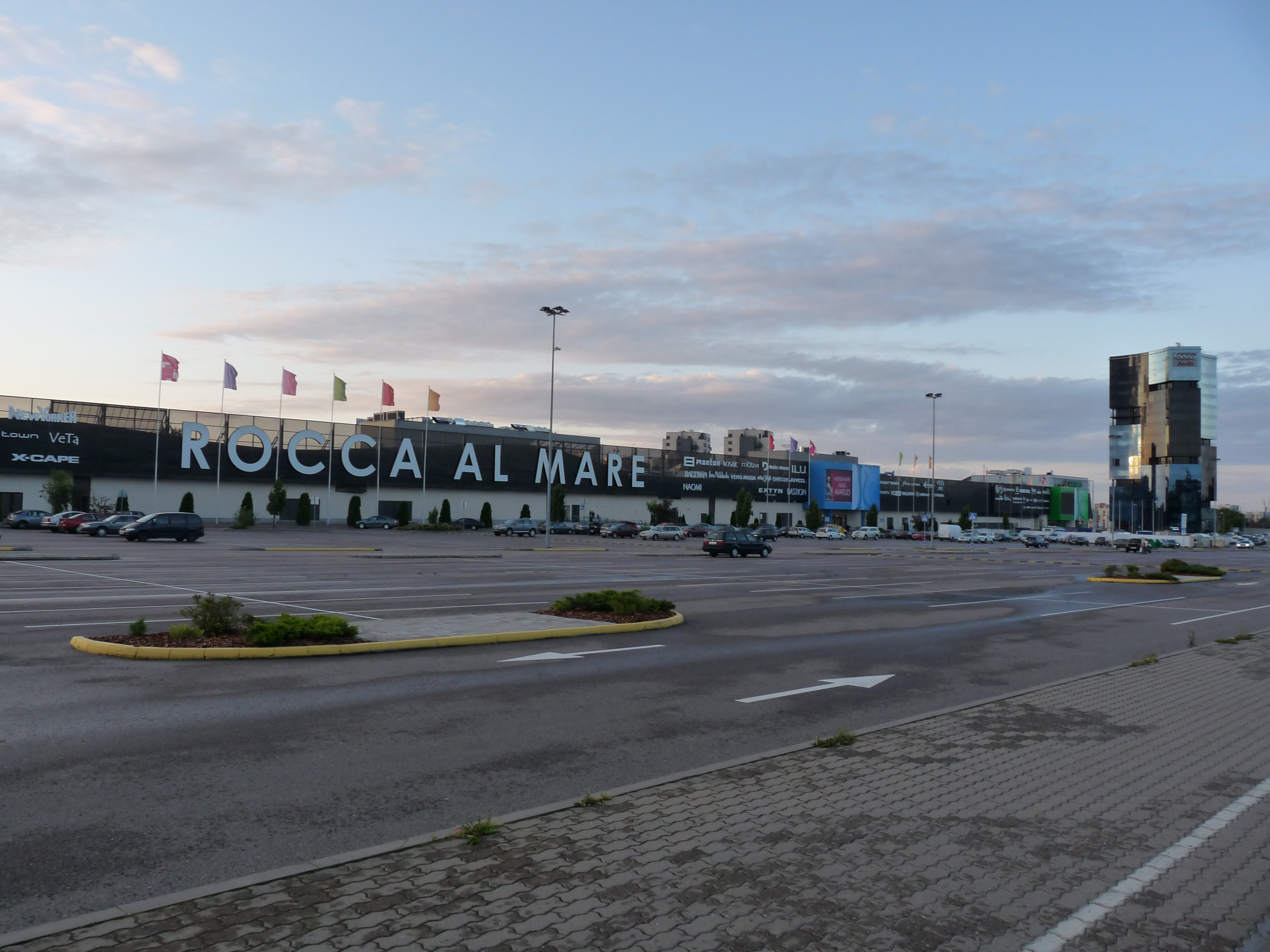
Rocca al Mare Shopping Centre
