= Rocca al Mare Shopping Centre =

Shopping mall in Tallinn, Estonia

Rocca al Mare
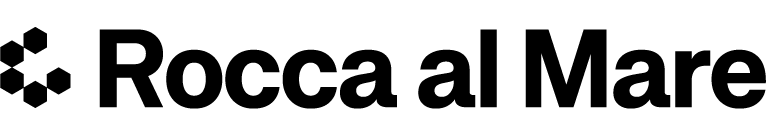

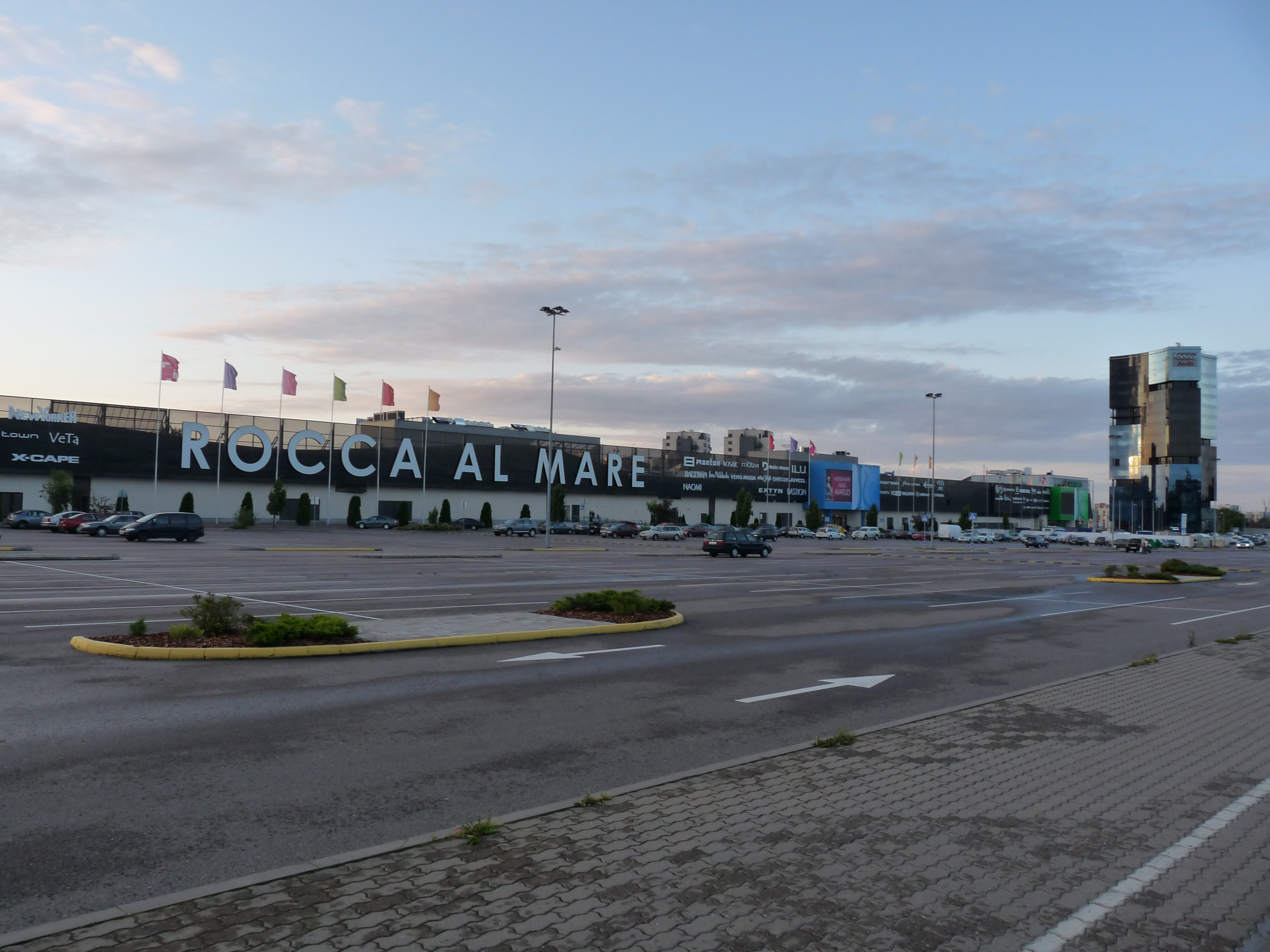
- Rocca al Mare shopping centre in 2009
- Location: Haabersti, Tallinn, Estonia
- Coordinates: 59°25′35″N 24°39′05″E
- Address: Paldiski mnt 102
- Opened: 1998
- Owner: Citycon Oyj
- Architect: Meeli Truu
- Num. of stores: 170
- Floor area: 70,000 square metres (753,474 sq ft)
- Floors: 3
- Parking: 1,300 bays
- Website: www.roccaalmare.ee

Rocca al Mare Shopping Centre (Estonian: Rocca al Mare Kaubanduskeskus) is a shopping centre in Tallinn, Estonia. It is situated in Haabersti, Haabersti District.

== Stores and facilities ==
Rocca al Mare is the third largest shopping centre in Estonia, with a gross leasable area of 54,000 square metres (580,000 sq ft) containing nearly 170 different shops (including 14 restaurants and cafés), free of charge dressing room, and more than 1300 parking spaces.

The shopping centre has three floors, with the shops and other commercial services on the first and second floors. The third floor is reserved for parking. The biggest shops in the centre are Coop, Selver, H&M, Euronics, Reserved, and Rademar, CCC, Pepco, NewYorker and more playroom of MaryMaris formerly is Seiklusmaa now in Ülemiste Centre and Järve Centre.

== History ==
Rocca al Mare Centre opened its doors in 1998, being the first and biggest of its kind in Estonia. It was designed by architects Meeli Truu and Anton Andres.

In 2005 Citycon Oyj (a company specialized on shopping centres' development and management) acquired Rocca al Mare Centre. Citycon Oyj's development began on 1 October 2008 when Rocca al Mare's first refreshed section was opened. In May 2009, a completely renovated fashion section in the left wing was opened, which offers a wide range of international and domestic brands. There are hundreds of brands represented in the centre, many of which have the only representative in Estonia located in the Rocca al Mare shopping centre. Rocca Al Mare is one center of Citycon OYJ in Estonia A Magistral & Kristiine Centre is formerly centres
