= Tallinn =

Capital and largest city of Estonia

- Municipality and capital city
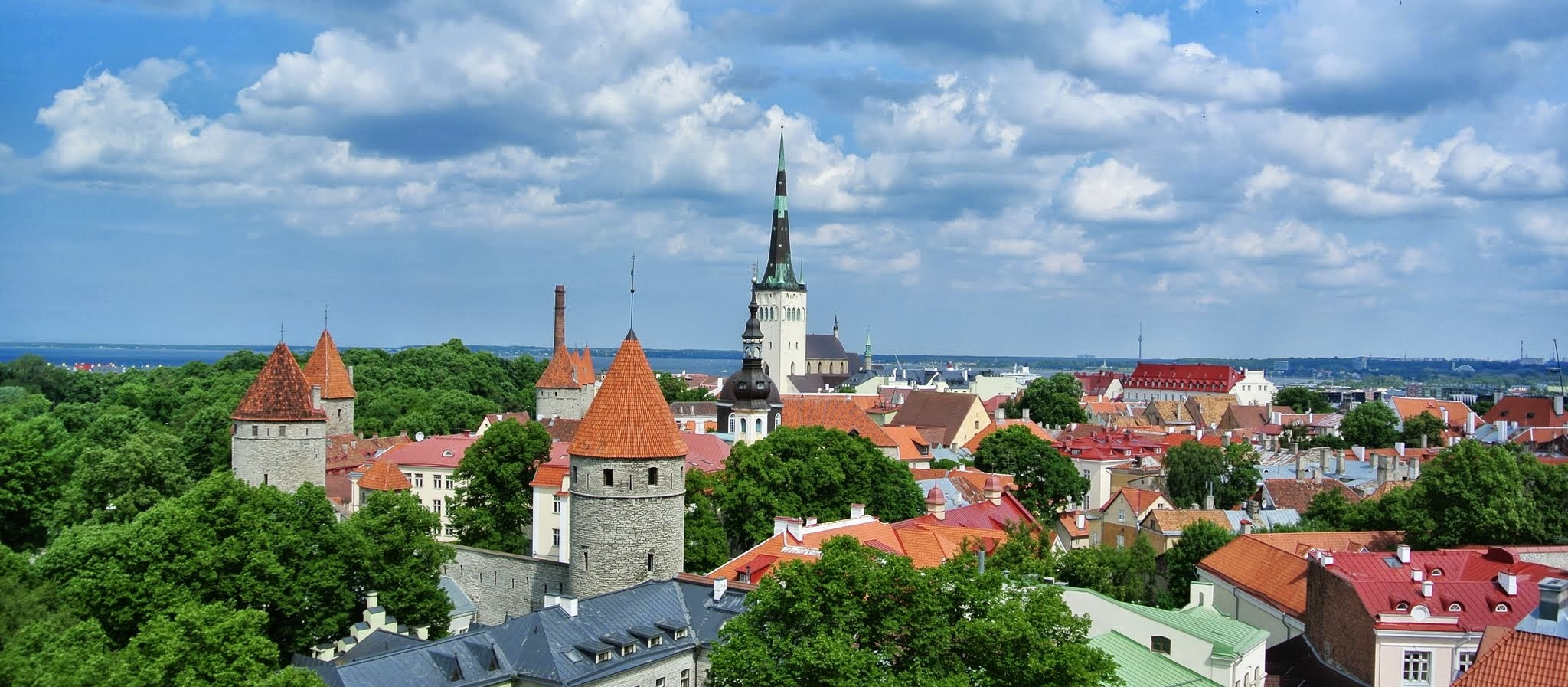
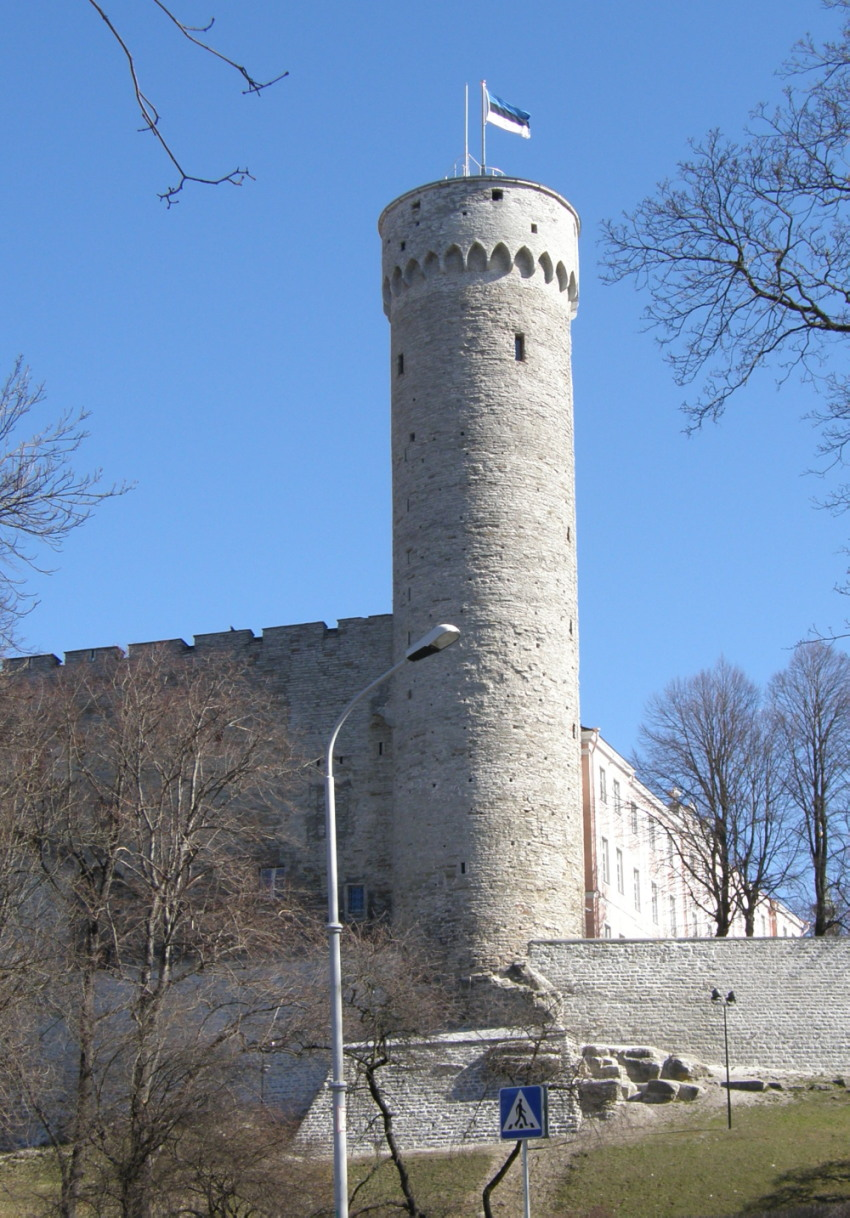
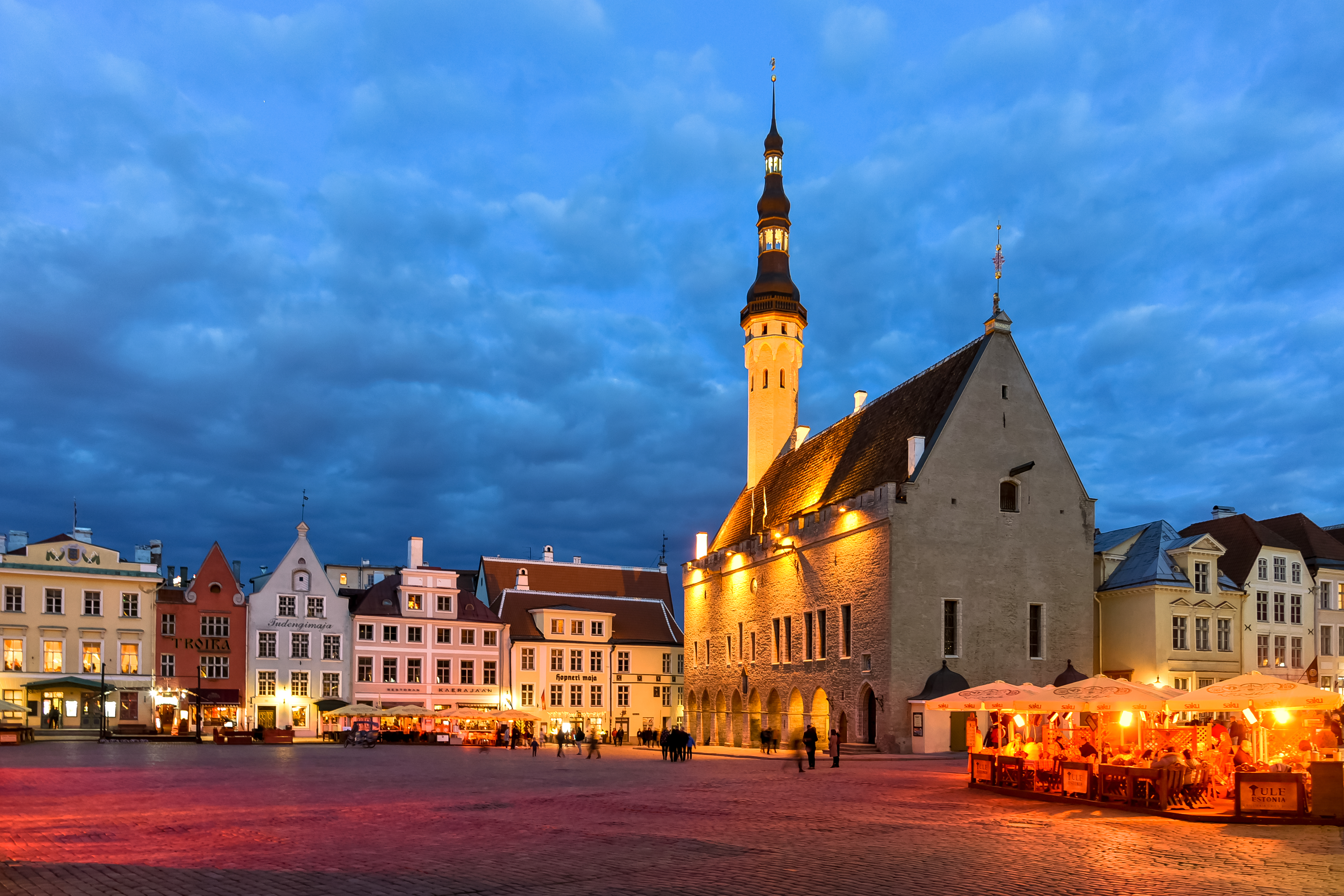
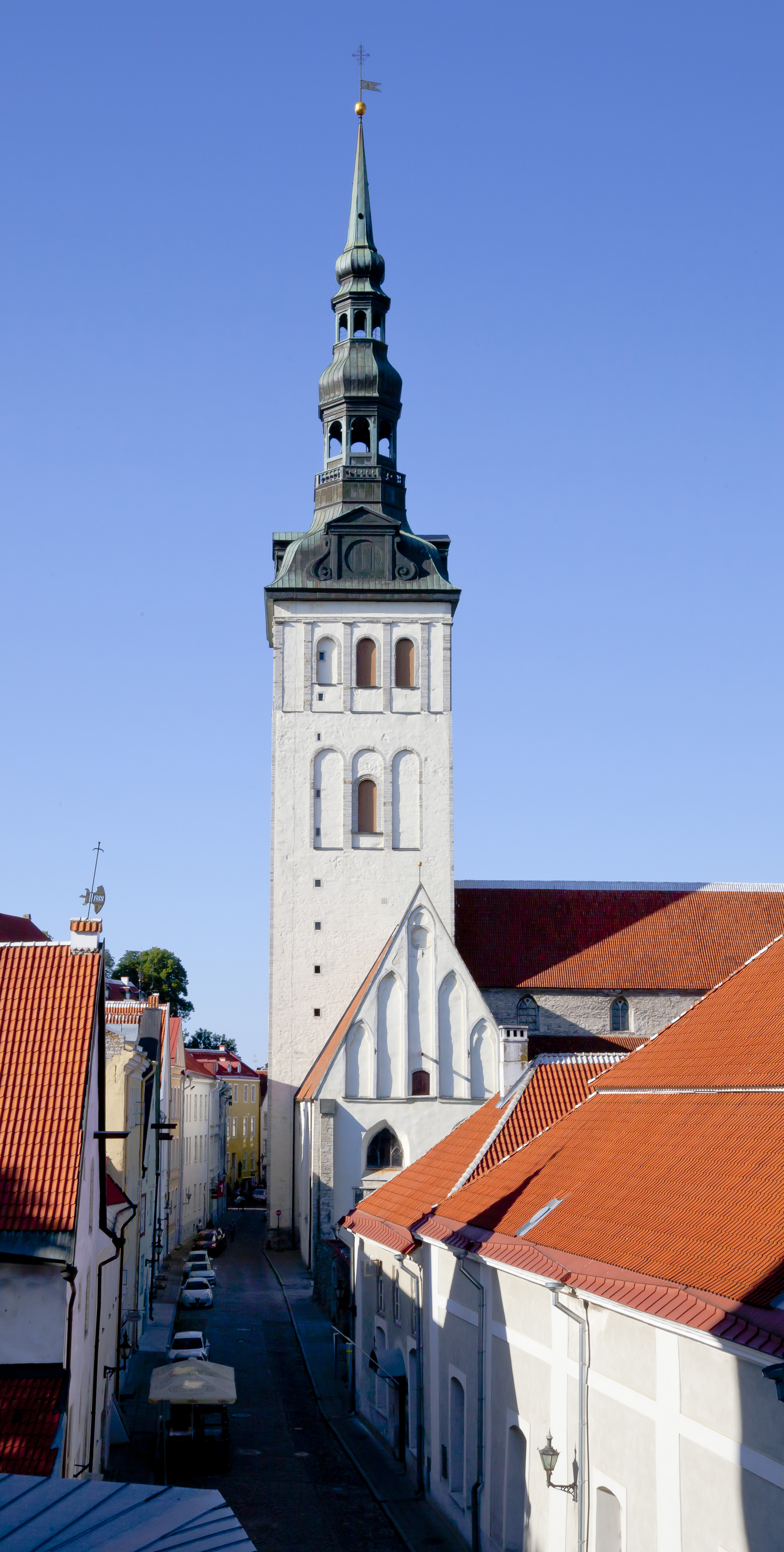
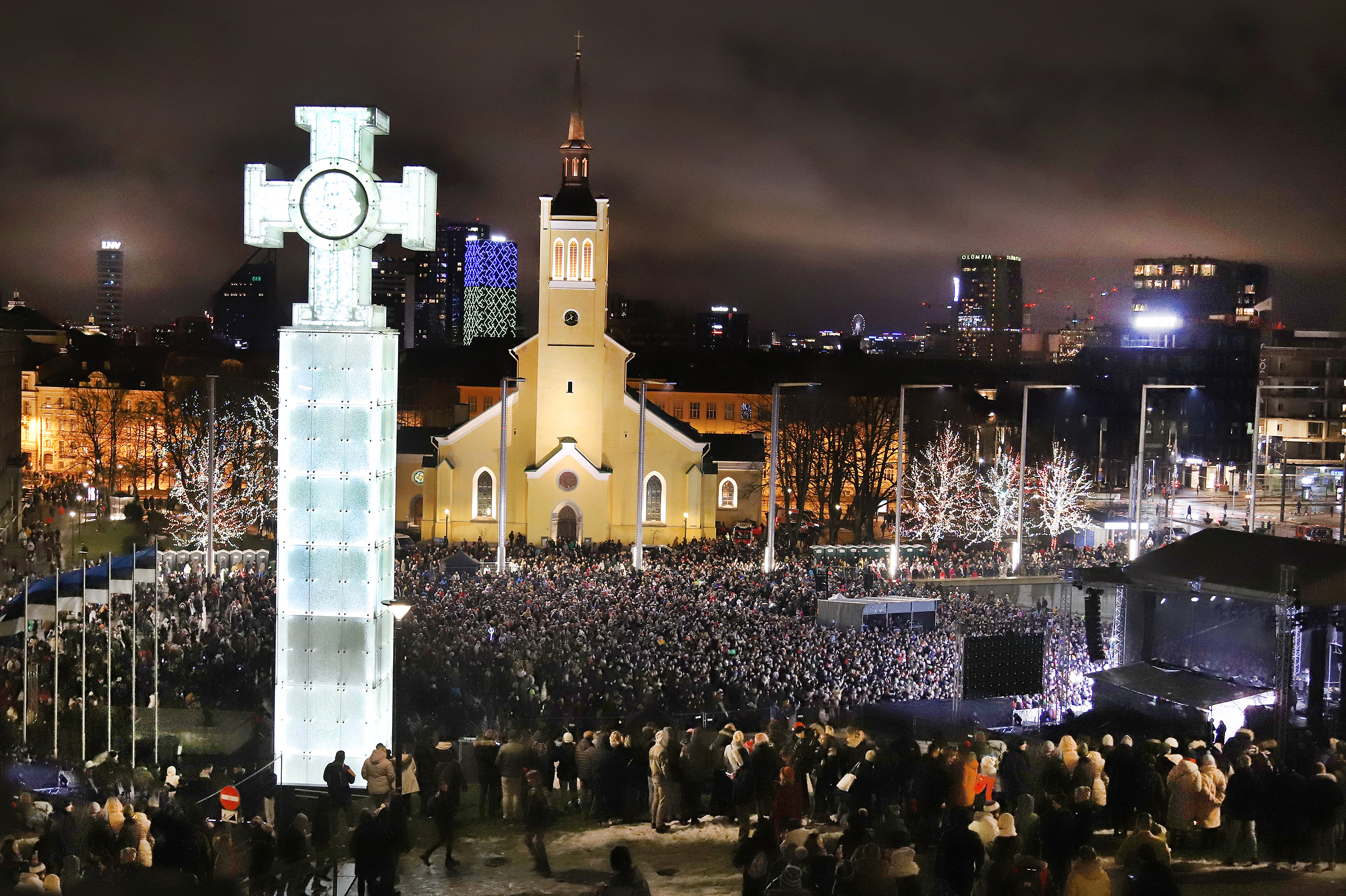
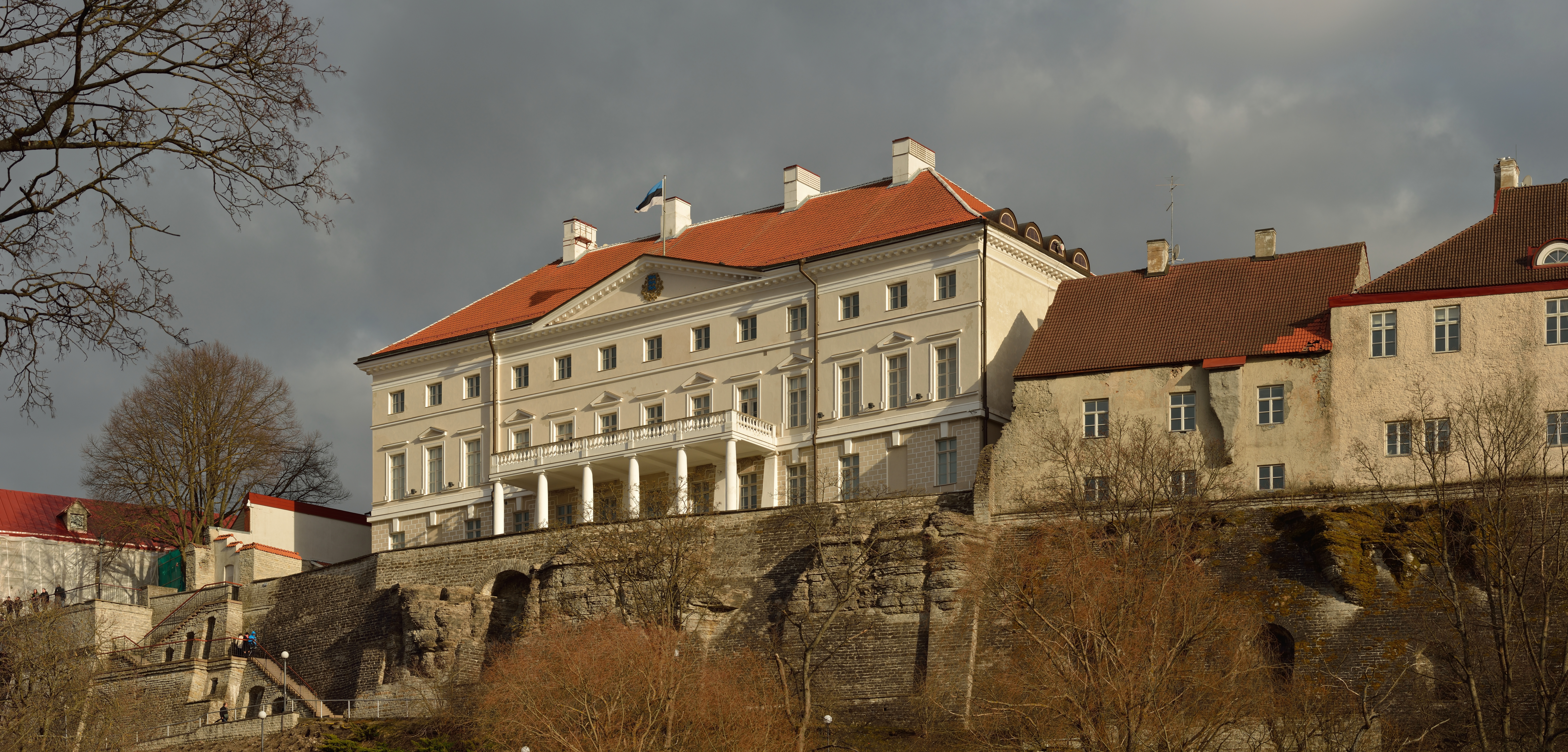
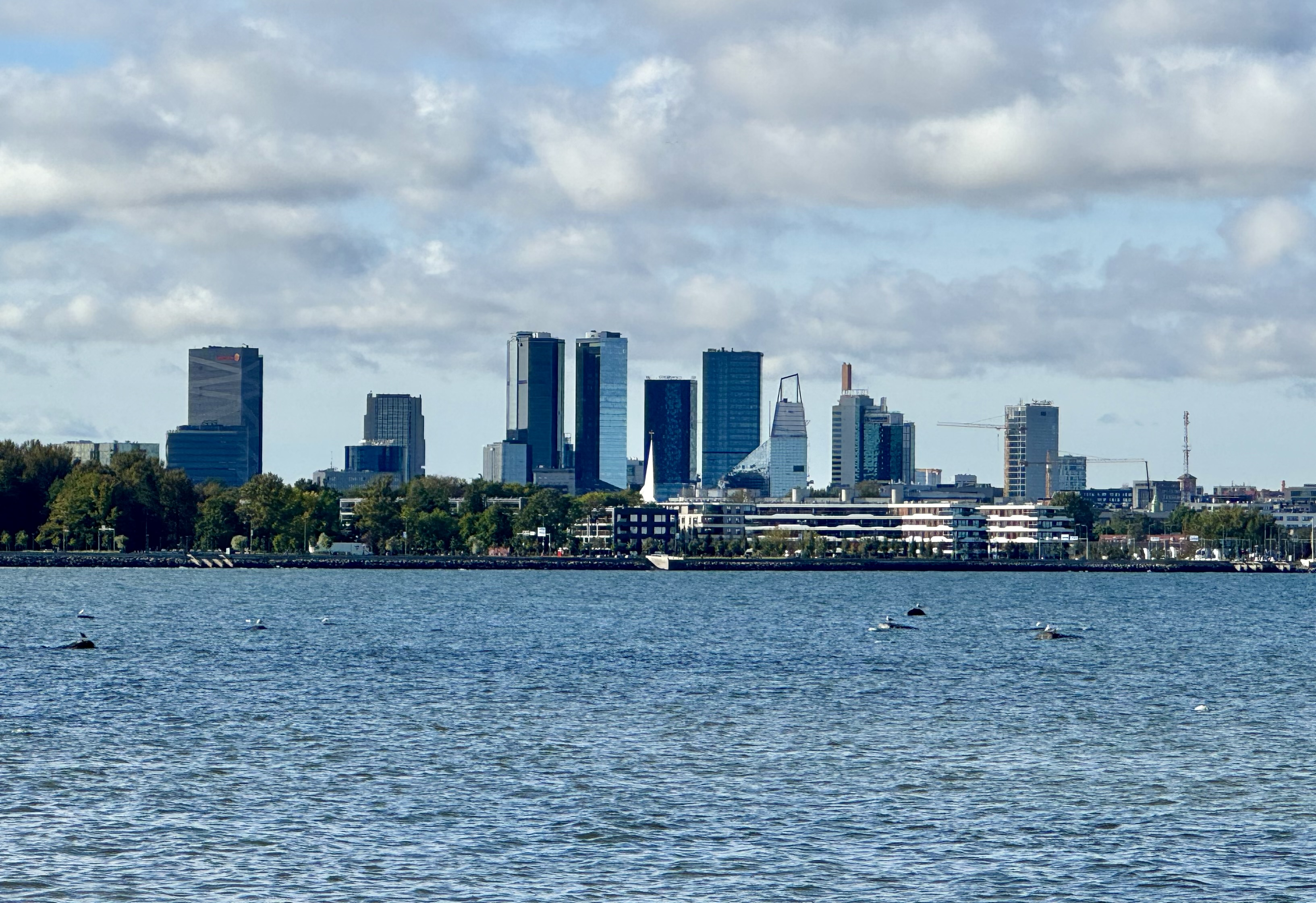
- Tallinn Old Town and St. Olaf's Church (middle) Pikk Hermann Town Hall Square St. Nicholas' Freedom Square Stenbock House Kumu Art Museum Tallinn Bay and city centre

- Flag Coat of arms Brandmark
- Interactive map of Tallinn
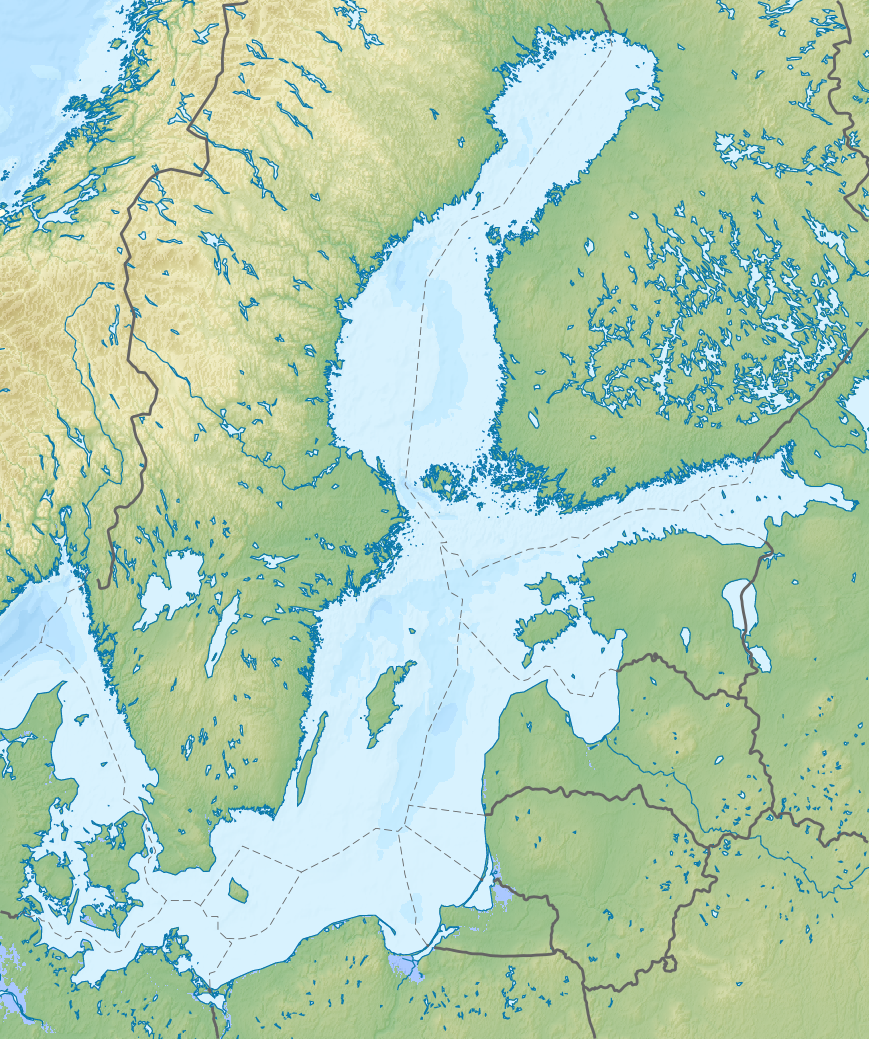
- Location in Europe Location in the Baltic Sea region Location within Estonia
- Coordinates: 59°26′14″N 24°44′43″E
- Country: Estonia
- County: Harju
- First confirmed written record: 1219
- First possible appearance on map: 1154
- City rights: 1248
- Boroughs: 8 districts

Government
  - Type: Tallinn City Government
  - Body: Tallinn City Council
  - Mayor: Peeter Raudsepp

Area
  - Municipality and capital city: 159.38 km^{2} (61.54 sq mi)
- Elevation: 9 m (30 ft)

Population (2026)
  - Municipality and capital city: 452,563
  - Rank: 1st in Estonia
  - Density: 2,839.5/km^{2} (7,354.3/sq mi)
  - Metro: 646,315
- Demonym(s): Tallinner (English) tallinlane (Estonian)

GDP (nominal, 2024)
  - Municipality and capital city: €20.67 billion
  - Per capita: €45,223
- Time zone: UTC+02:00 (EET)
  - Summer (DST): UTC+03:00 (EEST)
- ISO 3166 code: EE-784
- International airport: Lennart Meri Tallinn (TLL)
- City budget: €1.3 billion (2026)
- Website: tallinn.ee/eng

UNESCO World Heritage Site
- Official name: Historic Centre (Old Town) of Tallinn
- Type: Cultural
- Criteria: ii, iv
- Designated: 1997 (21st session)
- Reference no.: 822bis
- UNESCO region: Europe

Tallinn (Note: /ˈtælɪn/ TAL-in, US also /ˈtɑːlɪn/ TAH-lin; Estonian: [ˈtɑlʲːinː]) is the capital and largest city of Estonia. Located on a bay in northern Estonia, on the shore of the Gulf of Finland of the Baltic Sea, it has a population of 452,563 as of 2026, making it the third most-populous city in the Baltics. As of 2024, the population of the Tallinn metropolitan area is estimated at 646,315. Tallinn is the main governmental, financial, industrial, and cultural centre of Estonia. It is located 187 kilometres (116 mi) northwest of the country's second largest city, Tartu, however, only 80 kilometres (50 mi) south of Helsinki, the capital city of Finland. It is also 320 kilometres (200 mi) west of Saint Petersburg, Russia, 300 kilometres (190 mi) north of Riga, Latvia, and 380 kilometres (240 mi) east of Stockholm, Sweden. From the 13th century until the first half of the 20th century, Tallinn was known in most of the world by variants of its other historical name, Reval.

Reval (Tallinn) received Lübeck city rights in 1248; however, the earliest evidence of human settlement in the area dates back almost 5,000 years. The medieval indigenous inhabitants of present-day Tallinn and northern Estonia were among the last "pagan" peoples in Europe to be Christianised during the papal-sanctioned Northern Crusades in the 13th century.

The first recorded claim to the area was made by Denmark after a successful raid in 1219 led by King Valdemar II, followed by a period of alternating Scandinavian and Teutonic rulers. Due to the strategic location by the sea, its port became a significant trade hub, especially in the 14th to 16th centuries, when Tallinn grew in importance as the northernmost member city of the Hanseatic League. Tallinn Old Town is one of the best-preserved medieval cities in Europe and is listed as a UNESCO World Heritage Site.

In 2012, Tallinn had the highest number of startup companies (per capita) among all capitals and larger cities in Europe. Tallinn is the birthplace of many international high-technology companies, including Bolt and Skype. The city is home to the headquarters of the European Union's IT agency and to the NATO Cyber Defence Centre of Excellence. In 2007, Tallinn was listed among the top-10 digital cities in the world, and in 2022, Tallinn was listed among the top-10 "medium-sized European cities of the future".

== Names and etymology ==
The name Tallinn is Estonian. It has been widely considered a historical derivation of Taani-linna, (Note: The Finnic element -linna, like Germanic -burg and Slavic -grad /-gorod, originally meant "fortress", but has been used as a suffix in the formation of town names. The Estonian word linn nowadays means "town" or "city".) meaning "Danish-castle" (Note: The Danish heritage is also evident in the city's lesser coat of arms, depicting the flag of Denmark (Dannebrog).) (Latin: Castrum Danorum), conceivably because the Danish invaders built the castle in place of the Estonian stronghold after the 1219 battle of Lyndanisse.

The Icelandic Njál's saga—composed after 1270, but describing events between 960 and 1020—mentions an event that occurred somewhere in the area of Tallinn and calls the place Rafala (probably a derivation of Revala, Rävala, or some other variant of the Estonian name of the adjacent medieval Estonian county). Soon after the Danish conquest in 1219, the town became known in the Scandinavian and German languages as Reval (Latin: Revalia). The etymology of Revala and derivatives in Estonian is unclear and hypotheses are numerous.

In international use, the English and German-language Reval as well as the Russian analog Revel (Ревель) were all gradually replaced by the Estonian name after the country became independent in 1918. At first, both Estonian forms, Tallinna and Tallinn, were used.

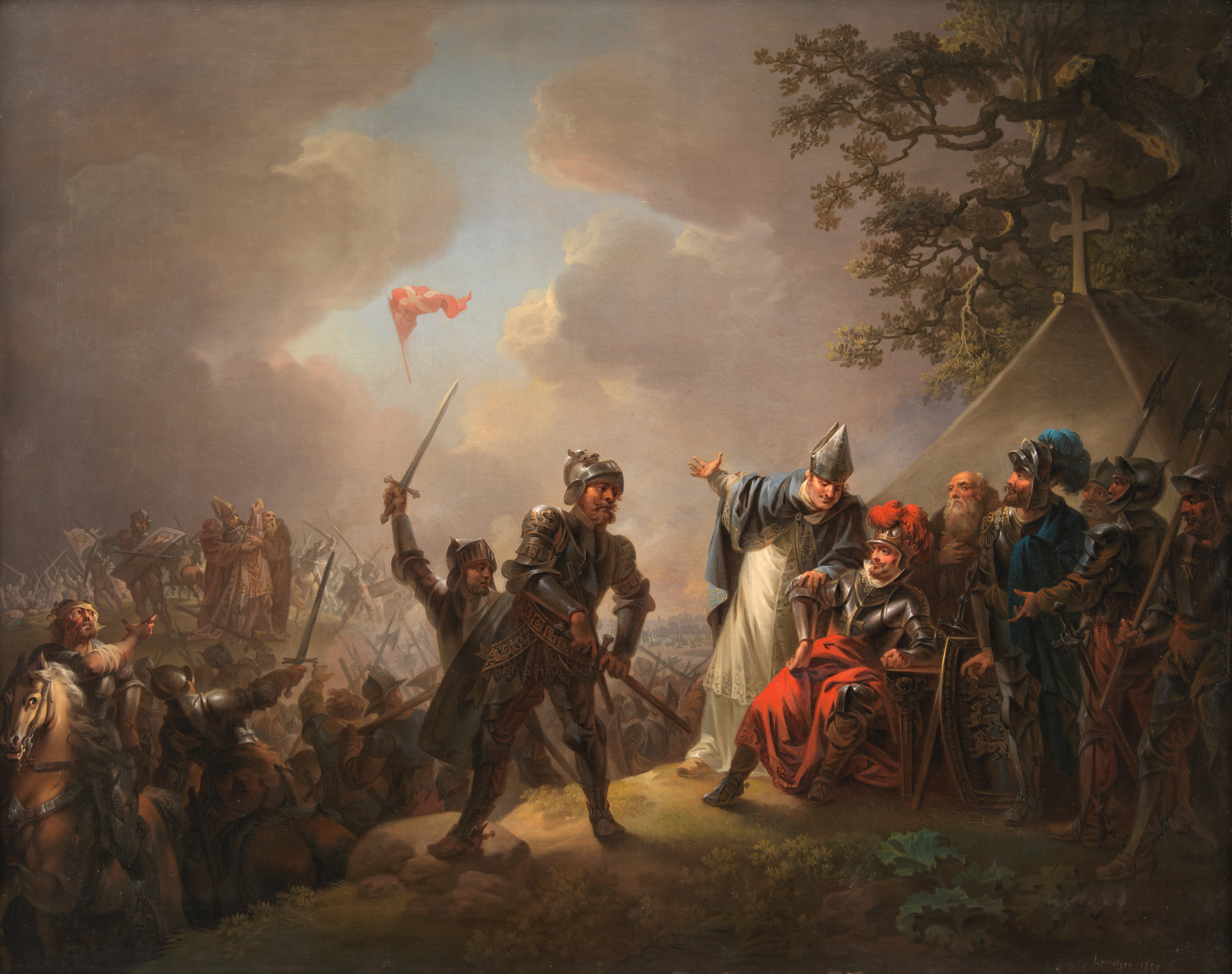
The first-ever Danish flag falling from the sky during the Battle of Lindanise (Tallinn), 15 June 1219. Painted by C. A. Lorentzen in 1809.

Henry of Livonia, in his chronicle (c. 1229), called the town with the name that is also known to have been used up to the 13th century by Scandinavians: Lindanisa (or Lyndanisse in Danish, Lindanäs in Swedish and Ledenets in Old East Slavic).

In 1154, a town called قلون (Qlwn or Quwri) was recorded in the description of the world on the world map (Tabula Rogeriana) commissioned by the Norman King Roger II of Sicily and compiled by Arab cartographer Muhammad al-Idrisi, who described it as "a small town like a large castle" among the towns of 'Astlanda'. It has been suggested that one possible transcription, 'Qlwn', may have denoted a predecessor of the modern city and may somehow be related to a toponym Kolyvan, which has been discovered from later East Slavic chronicles. However, a number of historians have considered connecting any of al-Idrisi's placenames with modern Tallinn erroneous, unfounded, or speculative.

== History ==
The first archaeological traces of a small hunter-fisherman community's presence in what is now Tallinn's city centre are c. 5,000 years old. The comb ceramic pottery found on the site dates to about 3000 BCE and corded ware pottery to around 2500 BCE.

The lesser coat of arms of Tallinn depicts the Dannebrog cross.

Around 1050 AD, a fortress was built in what is now central Tallinn, on the hill of Toompea.

As an important port on a major trade route between Novgorod and western Europe, it became a target for the expansion of the Teutonic Order and the Kingdom of Denmark during the period of Northern Crusades in the beginning of the 13th century when Roman Catholic Christianity was forcibly imposed on the local population. The King Valdemar II of Denmark conquered Tallinn and northern Estonia in 1219.

Tallinn, then known more widely as Reval, was granted Lübeck town rights by the king of Denmark in 1248. In 1285, Reval became the northernmost member of the Hanseatic League – a mercantile and military alliance of German-dominated cities in Northern Europe. The king of Denmark sold Reval along with other land possessions in north Estonia to the Teutonic Order in 1346. Reval was arguably the most significant medieval port in the Gulf of Finland. Reval enjoyed a strategic position at the crossroads of trade between the rest of western Europe and Novgorod and Muscovy in the east. The city, with a population of about 8,000, was very well fortified with city walls and 66 defence towers. The city wall has been described as an outstanding example of German Medieval fortification architecture.

A weather vane, the figure of an old warrior called Old Thomas, was put on top of the spire of the Tallinn Town Hall in 1530. Old Thomas later became a popular symbol of the city.

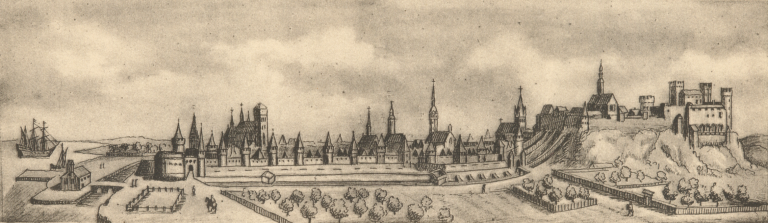
City skyline of Tallinn (Reval) and the harbour in 1650

In the early years of the Protestant Reformation, the city converted to Lutheranism. In 1561, Reval (Tallinn) became a dominion of Sweden.

During the 1700–1721 Great Northern War, plague-stricken Tallinn along with Swedish Estonia and Livonia capitulated to Tsardom of Russia (Muscovy) in 1710, but the local self-government institutions (Magistracy of Reval and Estonian Knighthood) retained their cultural and economical autonomy within the Governorate of Estonia of the Russian Empire. The Magistracy of Reval was abolished in 1889. The 19th century brought industrialisation of the city and the port kept its importance.

On 24 February 1918, the Estonian Declaration of Independence was proclaimed in Tallinn. It was followed by German occupation until the end of World War I in November 1918, after which Tallinn became the capital of independent Estonia. During World War II, Estonia was first occupied by the Soviet army and annexed to the USSR in the summer of 1940, then occupied by Nazi Germany from 1941 to 1944. During the German occupation Tallinn suffered from many instances of aerial bombing by the Soviet air force. During the most devastating Soviet bombing raid on 9–10 March 1944, more than a thousand incendiary bombs were dropped on the city, which caused large-scale fires, as a result of which 757 people were killed (including 586 civilians) and 20,000 left without shelter. After the German retreat in September 1944, the city was re-occupied by the Soviet Union.

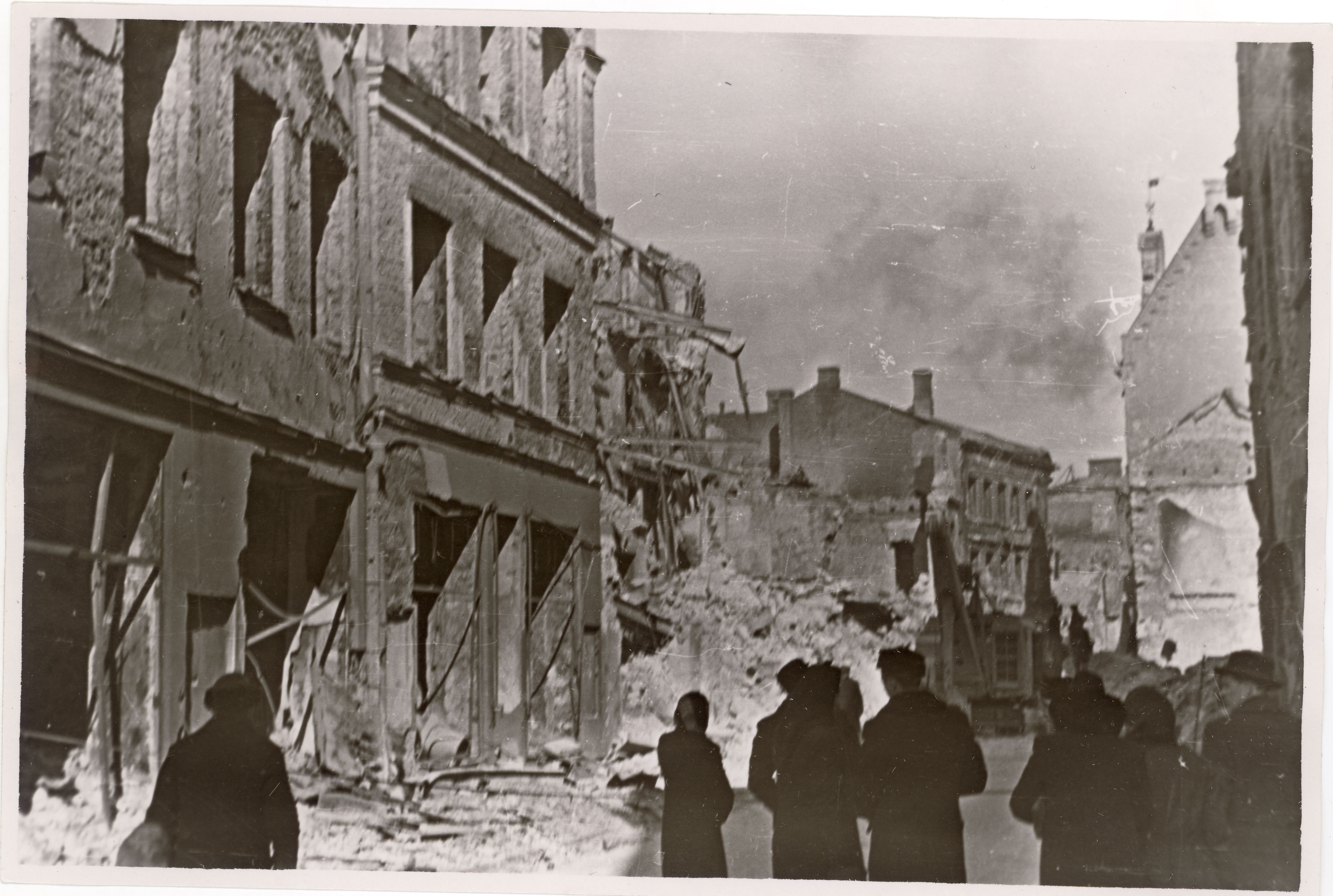
Harju Street in Tallinn old town after the Soviet aerial bombing in March 1944

During the 1980 Summer Olympics, the sailing (then known as yachting) events were held at Pirita, north-east of central Tallinn. Many buildings, such as the Tallinn TV Tower, "Olümpia" hotel, the new Main Post Office building, and the Regatta Centre, were built for the Olympics.

In 1991, the independent democratic Estonian nation was restored and a period of quick development as a modern European capital ensued. Tallinn became the capital of a de facto independent country once again on 20 August 1991. The Old Town became a World Heritage Site in 1997, and the city hosted the 2002 Eurovision Song Contest. Tallinn was the 2011 European Capital of Culture, and is the recipient of the 2023 European Green Capital Award. The city has pledged to cut greenhouse gas emissions by 40% by 2030 and takes pride in its biodiversity and high air quality. But critics say that the award was received on false promises since it won the title with its "15-minute city" concept, according to which key facilities and services should be accessible within a 15-minute walk or bike ride but the concept was left out of the green capital program and other parts of the 12 million euro program amount to a collection of temporary and one-off projects without any structural and lasting changes.

== Geography ==
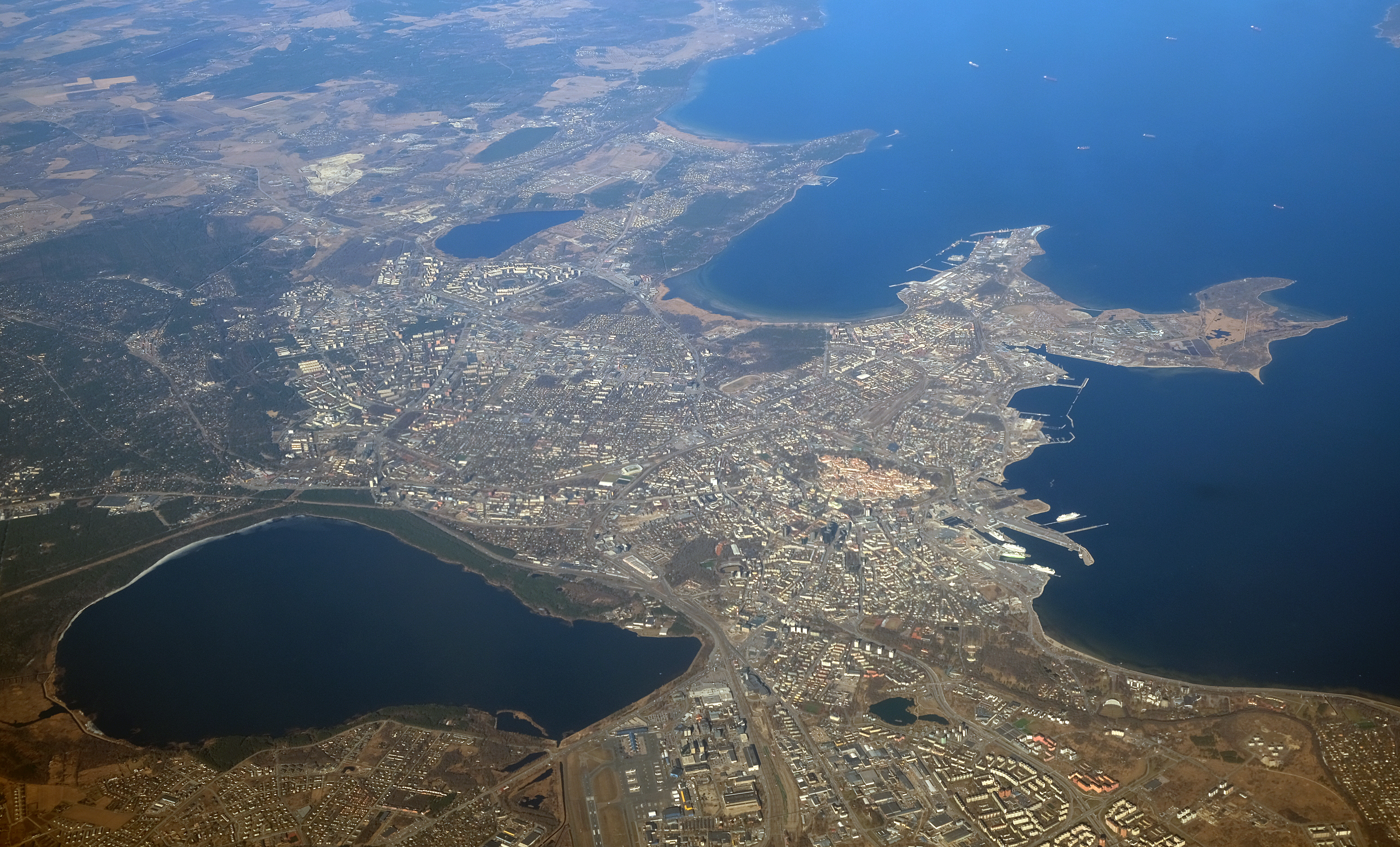
Aerial view of the city with its lakes and seaside coast

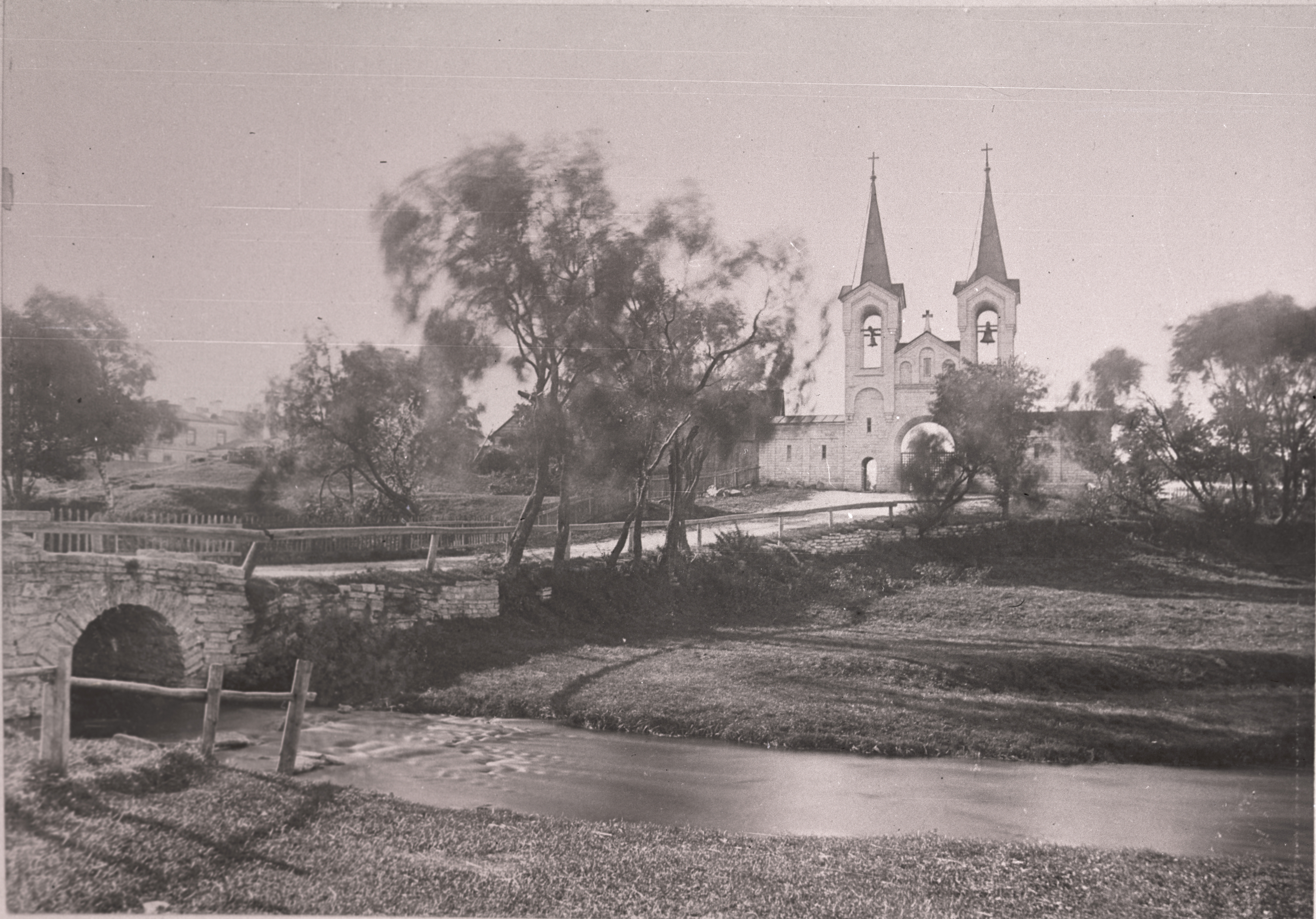
Härjapea river, 1889

Tallinn is situated on the southern coast of the Gulf of Finland, in north-western Estonia.

The largest lake in Tallinn is Lake Ülemiste (9.44 square kilometres (3.64 sq mi)), which serves as the main source of the city's drinking water. Lake Harku is the second-largest lake within the borders of Tallinn and its area is 1.6 square kilometres (0.62 sq mi). The only significant river in Tallinn nowadays is the Pirita river, in the eponymous Pirita city district. Historically, a smaller river, called Härjapea, flowed from Lake Ülemiste through the town into the sea, but the river was diverted into underground sewerage system in the 1930s and has since completely disappeared from the cityscape. References to it still remain in the street names Jõe (from jõgi, river) and Kivisilla (from kivi sild, stone bridge).

The length of the seaside coast is 46 kilometres (29 mi), comprising three larger (Kopli, Paljassaare, and Kakumäe) peninsulas. The city has a number of public beaches, including those at Pirita, Stroomi, Kakumäe, Harku, and Pikakari.

The highest point in Tallinn, at 64 metres (210 feet) above sea level, is situated in Hiiu, Nõmme District, in the southwestern portion of the city. A large limestone cliff runs through the city. It can be seen at Toompea, Lasnamäe, and Astangu. However, the hill at Toompea, despite its prominence, is not geologically connected to the larger limestone cliff formation.

The rocks and sediments underneath Tallinn are of different composition and age. Youngest are the Quaternary deposits. The materials of these deposits are till, varved clay, sand, gravel, and pebbles that are of glacial, marine and lacustrine origin. Some of the Quaternary deposits are valuable as they constitute aquifers, or as in the case of gravels and sands, are used as construction materials. The Quaternary deposits are the fill of valleys that are now buried. The buried valleys of Tallinn are carved into older rock likely by ancient rivers to be later modified by glaciers. While the valley fill is made up of Quaternary sediments the valleys themselves originated from erosion that took place before the Quaternary. The substrate into which the buried valleys were carved is made up of hard sedimentary rock of Ediacaran, Cambrian and Ordovician age. Only the upper layer of Ordovician rocks protrudes from the cover of younger deposits, cropping out in the Baltic Klint at the coast and at a few places inland. The Ordovician rocks are made up from top to bottom of a thick layer of limestone and marlstone, then a first layer of argillite followed by first layer of sandstone and siltstone and then another layer of argillite also followed by sandstone and siltstone. In other places of the city, hard sedimentary rock is only to be found beneath Quaternary sediments at depths reaching as much as 120 m below sea level. Underlying the sedimentary rock are the rocks of the Fennoscandian Craton including gneisses and other metamorphic rocks with volcanic rock protoliths and rapakivi granites. These rocks are much older than the rest (Paleoproterozoic age) and do not crop out anywhere in Estonia.

=== Climate ===
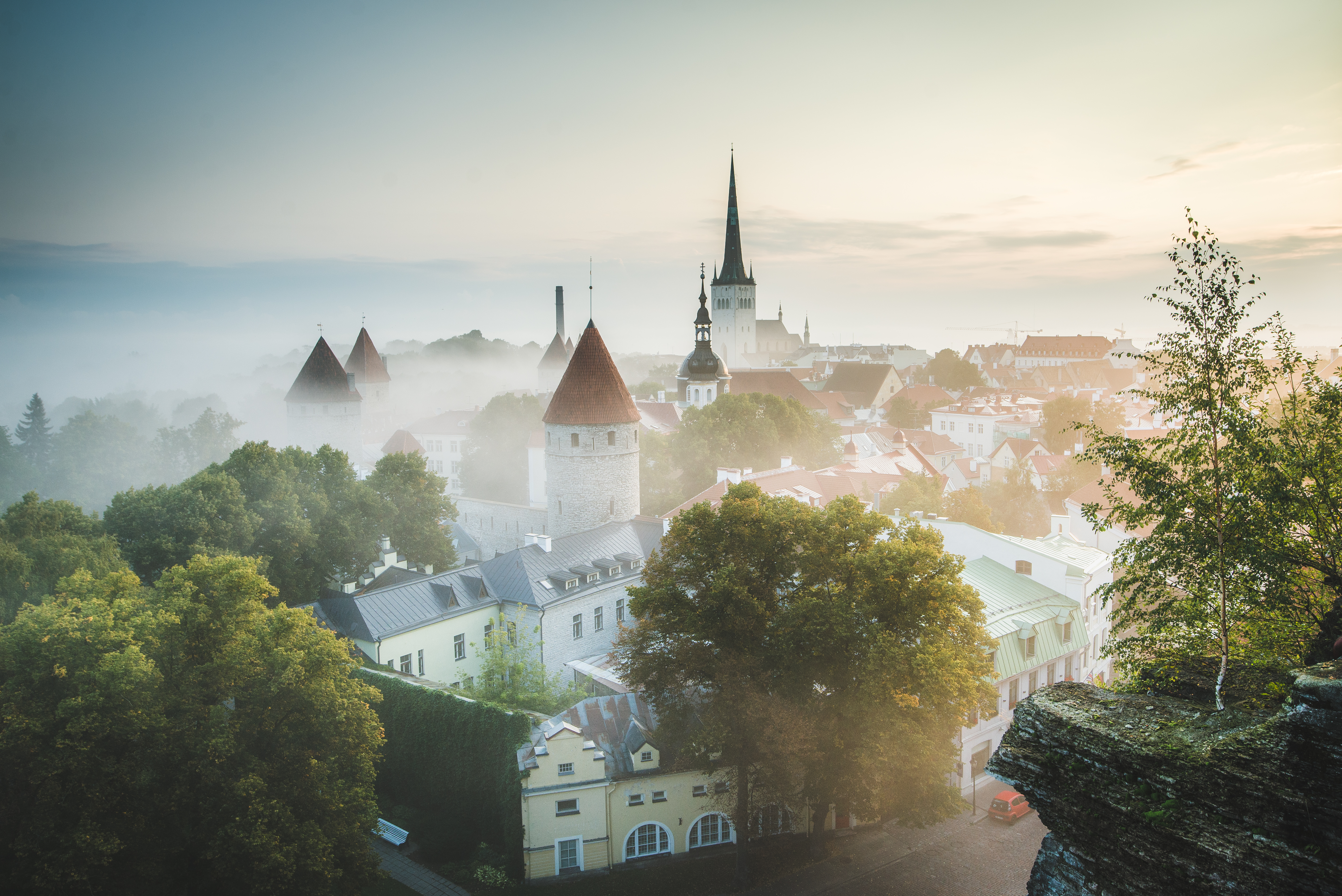
Tallinn's Old Town on a September morning.

Tallinn has a humid continental climate (Köppen climate classification Dfb) with warm, rainy summers and cold, snowy winters.

Winters are cold, but mild for its latitude, owing to its coastal location. The average temperature in February, the coldest month, is −3.6 °C (25.5 °F). During the winters, temperatures tend to hover close to freezing, but mild spells of weather can push temperatures above 0 °C (32 °F), occasionally reaching above 5 °C (41 °F) while cold air masses can push temperatures below −18 °C (0 °F) an average of 6 days a year. Snowfall is common during the winters, which are cloudy and characterised by low amounts of sunshine, ranging from only 20.7 hours of sunshine per month in December to 58.8 hours in February. At the winter solstice, daylight lasts for less than 6 hours and 5 minutes.

Spring starts out cool, with freezing temperatures common in March and April, but gradually becomes warmer and sunnier in May, when daytime temperatures average 15.4 °C (59.7 °F), although nighttime temperatures still remain cool, averaging −3.7 to 5.2 °C (25.3 to 41.4 °F) from March to May. In early spring, freezing temperatures are common in March and snowfall can occur in April.

Summers are warm with daytime temperatures hovering around 19.2 to 22.2 °C (66.6 to 72.0 °F) and nighttime temperatures averaging between 9.8 to 13.1 °C (49.6 to 55.6 °F) from June to August. The warmest month is usually July, with an average of 17.6 °C (63.7 °F). During summer, partly cloudy or clear days are common and it is the sunniest season, ranging from 255.6 hours of sunshine in August to 312.1 hours in July although precipitation is higher during these months. At the summer solstice, daylight lasts for more than 18 hours and 40 minutes. The highest probability of thunderstorms is in August.

Autumn starts out mild, and increasingly becomes cooler and cloudier in November. In September, temperatures commonly reach 16.1 °C (61.0 °F). In late autumn, snowfall can occur in October and freezing temperatures become more common in November. The highest probability of fog is in September and November.

Tallinn receives 700 millimetres (28 inches) of precipitation annually, which is evenly distributed throughout the year although March, April and May are the driest months, averaging about 35 to 37 mm (1.4 to 1.5 in), while July and August are the wettest months with 82 to 85 mm (3.2 to 3.3 in) of precipitation. The average humidity is 81%, ranging from a high of 89% to a low of 69% in May. Tallinn has an average windspeed of 3.3 m/s (11 ft/s) with winters being the windiest (around 3.7 m/s (12 ft/s) in January) and summers being the least windy at around 2.7 m/s (8.9 ft/s) in August. At Tallinn airport, winds blow predominantly from the southwest, south, and west.

The city's climate, along with Riga and Helsinki, has been characterized as unpredictable. Temperature extremes range from −32.2 °C (−26.0 °F) on 31 December 1978 to 34.3 °C (93.7 °F) on 30 July 1994.

Climate data for Tallinn, Estonia (normals 1991–2020 and extremes 1805–present)
Month	Jan	Feb	Mar	Apr	May	Jun	Jul	Aug	Sep	Oct	Nov	Dec	Year
Record high °C (°F)	9.2 (48.6)	10.2 (50.4)	17.1 (62.8)	27.2 (81.0)	31.4 (88.5)	32.6 (90.7)	34.3 (93.7)	34.2 (93.6)	28.0 (82.4)	21.8 (71.2)	14.1 (57.4)	11.6 (52.9)	34.3 (93.7)
Mean maximum °C (°F)	5.0 (41.0)	4.8 (40.6)	9.9 (49.8)	19.3 (66.7)	24.7 (76.5)	26.2 (79.2)	28.9 (84.0)	27.6 (81.7)	22.6 (72.7)	15.5 (59.9)	9.8 (49.6)	6.3 (43.3)	30.2 (86.4)
Mean daily maximum °C (°F)	−0.7 (30.7)	−1.0 (30.2)	2.8 (37.0)	9.5 (49.1)	15.4 (59.7)	19.2 (66.6)	22.2 (72.0)	21.0 (69.8)	16.1 (61.0)	9.5 (49.1)	4.1 (39.4)	1.2 (34.2)	9.9 (49.8)
Daily mean °C (°F)	−2.9 (26.8)	−3.6 (25.5)	−0.6 (30.9)	4.8 (40.6)	10.2 (50.4)	14.5 (58.1)	17.6 (63.7)	16.5 (61.7)	12.0 (53.6)	6.5 (43.7)	2.0 (35.6)	−0.9 (30.4)	6.4 (43.5)
Mean daily minimum °C (°F)	−5.5 (22.1)	−6.2 (20.8)	−3.7 (25.3)	0.7 (33.3)	5.2 (41.4)	9.8 (49.6)	13.1 (55.6)	12.3 (54.1)	8.4 (47.1)	3.7 (38.7)	−0.2 (31.6)	−3.1 (26.4)	2.9 (37.2)
Mean minimum °C (°F)	−17.0 (1.4)	−16.3 (2.7)	−12.6 (9.3)	−6.8 (19.8)	−1.4 (29.5)	3.9 (39.0)	8.0 (46.4)	6.1 (43.0)	1.8 (35.2)	−3.7 (25.3)	−7.9 (17.8)	−12.3 (9.9)	−20.3 (−4.5)
Record low °C (°F)	−31.4 (−24.5)	−28.7 (−19.7)	−24.5 (−12.1)	−12.0 (10.4)	−5.0 (23.0)	0.0 (32.0)	4.0 (39.2)	2.4 (36.3)	−4.1 (24.6)	−10.5 (13.1)	−18.8 (−1.8)	−32.2 (−26.0)	−32.2 (−26.0)
Average precipitation mm (inches)	56 (2.2)	40 (1.6)	37 (1.5)	35 (1.4)	37 (1.5)	68 (2.7)	82 (3.2)	85 (3.3)	58 (2.3)	78 (3.1)	66 (2.6)	59 (2.3)	700 (27.6)
Average precipitation days (≥ 1.0 mm)	12.7	10.6	9.0	7.5	7.3	9.5	9.1	10.3	10.1	12.9	12.3	13.1	124.4
Average relative humidity (%)	89	86	80	72	69	74	76	79	82	85	89	89	81
Mean monthly sunshine hours	29.7	58.8	148.4	217.3	306.0	294.3	312.1	255.6	162.3	88.3	29.1	20.7	1,922.7
Average ultraviolet index	0	1	1	3	4	5	5	4	3	1	0	0	2
Source 1: Estonian Weather Service
Source 2: NOAA/NCEI (average precipitation days 1991–2020); Weather Atlas (average ultraviolet index); Keskkonnaagentuur.ee

Wind speed for Tallinn
Month	Jan	Feb	Mar	Apr	May	Jun	Jul	Aug	Sep	Oct	Nov	Dec	Year
Average wind speed m/s (ft/s)	3.7 (12.1)	3.5 (11.5)	3.4 (11.2)	3.3 (10.8)	3.1 (10.2)	3.0 (9.8)	2.8 (9.2)	2.7 (8.9)	3.0 (9.8)	3.3 (10.8)	3.6 (11.8)	3.8 (12.5)	3.3 (10.8)
Source 1: NOAA/NCEI

Coastal temperature data for Tallinn
Month	Jan	Feb	Mar	Apr	May	Jun	Jul	Aug	Sep	Oct	Nov	Dec	Year
Average sea temperature °C (°F)	1.0 (33.8)	0.1 (32.2)	0.1 (32.2)	1.7 (35.1)	6.9 (44.4)	13.4 (56.1)	18.8 (65.9)	19.0 (66.2)	15.8 (60.4)	10.8 (51.4)	7.0 (44.6)	4.1 (39.4)	8.2 (46.8)
Source 1: Seatemperature.org

== Administrative districts ==
Administrative districts of Tallinn

Tallinn is subdivided into eight administrative linnaosa (districts). Each district has a linnaosa valitsus (district government) which is managed by a linnaosavanem (district elder) who is appointed by the city government. The function of the "district governments", however, is not directly governing, but just limited to providing advice to the city government and the city council on issues related to the administration of respective districts.

District	Flag	Arms	Population (2025)	Area	Density
Haabersti	Haabersti district, Tallinn, Estonia		51,014	22.26 km^{2} (8.6 sq mi)	2,292
Kesklinn (centre)			68,447	30.58 km^{2} (11.8 sq mi)	2,238
Kristiine			34,661	7.83 km^{2} (3.0 sq mi)	4,427
Lasnamäe	Lasnamäe district, Tallinn, Estonia		116,648	27.47 km^{2} (10.6 sq mi)	4,246
Mustamäe			68,548	8.09 km^{2} (3.1 sq mi)	8,473
Nõmme	Nõmme district, Tallinn, Estonia		34,980	29.17 km^{2} (11.3 sq mi)	1,199
Pirita	Pirita district, Tallinn, Estonia		18,491	18.73 km^{2} (7.2 sq mi)	987
Põhja-Tallinn			63,729	15.19 km^{2} (5.9 sq mi)	4,195

The districts are administratively further divided into 84 asum (subdistricts or "neighbourhoods" with officially defined borders).

== Government ==
The city is governed by the Tallinn City Council which consists of 79 members elected to four year terms via party list. The mayor is elected by the city council.

== Demographics ==
Historical population
Year	Pop.	±%
1881	50,488	—
1897	64,572	+27.9%
1922	122,419	+89.6%
1934	137,792	+12.6%
1959	281,714	+104.4%
1970	369,583	+31.2%
1979	441,800	+19.5%
1989	499,421	+13.0%
2000	400,378	−19.8%
2011	393,222	−1.8%
2021	437,817	+11.3%
Source: Censuses

The population of Tallinn as of 1 January 2025 is 456,518. It is the primate and most populous city in Estonia, the 3rd most populous city in the three Baltic States (Estonia, Latvia, Lithuania), as well as the 59th most populous city in the European Union.

According to Eurostat, in 2004, Tallinn had one of the largest number of non-EU nationals of all EU member states' capital cities. Ethnic Russians are a significant minority in Tallinn, as around a third of the city's residents are first and second generation immigrants from Russia and other parts of the former Soviet Union; a majority of the Soviet-era immigrants now hold Estonian citizenship.

Ethnic Estonians made up over 80% of Tallinn's population before World War II. As of 2022, ethnic Estonians made up over 53% of the population. Tallinn was one of the urban areas with industrial and military significance in northern Estonia that during the period of Soviet occupation underwent extensive changes in its ethnic composition due to large influx of immigrants from Russia and other parts of the former USSR. Whole new city districts were built where the main intent of the then Soviet authorities was to accommodate Russian-speaking immigrants: Mustamäe, Väike-Õismäe, Pelguranna, and most notably, Lasnamäe, which in 1980s became, and is to this day, the most populous district of Tallinn.

The official language of Tallinn is Estonian. As of 2026, 53% of the city's residents were native speakers of Estonian, whereas 42% had Russian as their first language. While English is the most frequently used foreign language by the residents of Tallinn, there are also a significant number of native speakers of Ukrainian and Finnish.

Ethnic composition 1922–2021
Ethnicity	1922		1934		1941		1959		1970		1979		1989		2000		2011		2021	
Ethnicity	Number	%	Number	%	Number	%	Number	%	Number	%	Number	%	Number	%	Number	%	Number	%	Number	%
Estonians	102,568	83.9	117,918	85.6	132,396	94.0	169,697	60.2	201,908	55.7	222,218	51.9	227,245	47.4	215,114	53.7	217,601	55.3	233,520	53.3
Russians	7,513	6.14	7,888	5.72	5,689	4.04	90,594	32.2	127,103	35.0	162,714	38.0	197,187	41.2	146,208	36.5	144,721	36.8	149,883	34.2
Ukrainians	–	–	35	0.03	–	–	7,277	2.58	13,309	3.67	17,507	4.09	22,856	4.77	14,699	3.67	11,565	2.94	15,450	3.53
Belarusians	–	–	–	–	–	–	3,683	1.31	7,158	1.97	10,261	2.39	12,515	2.61	7,938	1.98	6,229	1.58	6,154	1.41
Finns	–	–	304	0.22	214	0.15	1,650	0.59	2,852	0.79	2,996	0.70	3,271	0.68	2,436	0.61	2,062	0.52	3,431	0.78
Jews	1,929	1.58	2,203	1.60	0	0.00	3,714	1.32	3,750	1.03	3,737	0.87	3,620	0.76	1,598	0.40	1,460	0.37	1,405	0.32
Latvians	–	–	572	0.42	340	0.24	702	0.25	1,007	0.28	1,259	0.29	1,032	0.22	827	0.21	628	0.16	1,500	0.34
Germans	6,904	5.65	6,575	4.77	–	–	125	0.04	217	0.06	332	0.08	516	0.11	516	0.13	492	0.13	1,219	0.28
Tatars	–	–	75	0.05	–	–	745	0.26	1,055	0.29	1,500	0.35	1,975	0.41	1,265	0.32	1,012	0.26	1,033	0.24
Poles	–	–	599	0.43	502	0.36	759	0.27	967	0.27	1,084	0.25	1,240	0.26	936	0.23	768	0.20	940	0.21
Lithuanians	–	–	92	0.07	97	0.07	594	0.21	852	0.23	905	0.21	1,052	0.22	949	0.24	795	0.20	1,092	0.25
Unknown/Not stated	0	0.00	368	0.27	150	0.11	0	0.00	0	0.00	1	0.00	7	0.00	3,694	0.92	709	0.18	4,317	0.99
Other	3,354	2.74	1163	0.84	1,523	1.08	2,174	0.77	2,528	0.70	4,023	0.94	6,458	1.35	4,198	1.05	5,180	1.32	17,873	4.08
Total	122,268	100	137,792	100	140,911	100	281,714	100	362,706	100	428,537	100	478,974	100	400,378	100	393,222	100	437,817	100

Largest ethnic groups
Ethnic group	Population (2026)	%
Estonians	239,700	52.96
Russians	129,105	28.52
Ukrainians	39,591	7.86
Belarusians	6,005	1.3
Finns	3,365	0.73
Jews	1,519	0.33
Latvians	1,712	0.37
Germans	1,330	0.29
Lithuanians	1,082	0.23
Armenians	1,186	0.25
Tatars	1,029	0.22
Azerbaijanis	1,321	0.28
Poles	964	0.21
Other	78,586	17.21
Unknown	3,238	0.7

== Religion ==
The pie chart to the right shows the distribution of religion in Tallinn as of 2021.

Religion in Tallinn (2021)
1. Unaffiliated (64.4%)
2. Orthodox & Old Believers (23.8%)
3. Lutheran (6.00%)
4. Catholic (1.15%)
5. Others Christian (1.70%)
6. Muslims (1.15%)
7. Other Religions or Unknown (1.80%)

== Economy ==
Rotermann business district

Tallinn has a highly diversified economy with particular strengths in information technology, tourism and logistics. More than half of Estonia's GDP is created in Tallinn. In 2008, the GDP per capita of Tallinn stood at 172% of the Estonian average. In addition to longtime functions as seaport and capital city, Tallinn has seen development of an information technology sector; in its 13 December 2005, edition, The New York Times characterised Estonia as "a sort of Silicon Valley on the Baltic Sea". One of Tallinn's sister cities is the Silicon Valley town of Los Gatos, California. Skype is one of the best-known of several Estonian start-ups originating from Tallinn. Many start-ups have originated from the Institute of Cybernetics. In recent years, Tallinn has gradually been becoming one of the main IT centres of Europe, with the Cooperative Cyber Defence Centre of Excellence (CCD COE) of NATO, eu-LISA, the EU Digital Agency and the IT development centres of large corporations, such as TeliaSonera and Kuehne + Nagel being based in the city.

Tallinn receives 4.3 million visitors annually, a figure that has grown steadily over the past decade. The Finns are especially a common sight in Tallinn; on average, about 20,000–40,000 Finnish tourists visit the city between June and October. Most of the visitors come from Europe, though Tallinn has also become increasingly visited by tourists from the Asia-Pacific region. Tallinn Passenger Port is one of the busiest cruise destinations on the Baltic Sea, it served more than 520,000 cruise passengers in 2013.

The state-owned energy company Eesti Energia, the nationwide electric power transmission system operator Elering, the natural gas distributor Eesti Gaas, and the country's largest private energy company, Alexela Group, all have their headquarters in Tallinn.

Tallinn is the financial centre of Estonia and also an important economic centre in the Baltoscandian region. Many major banks, such as SEB, Swedbank, and Nordea, have their local offices in Tallinn. LHV Pank, an Estonian investment bank, has its corporate headquarters in Tallinn. Tallinn Stock Exchange, part of NASDAQ OMX Group, is the only regulated exchange in Estonia.

Port of Tallinn is one of the biggest ports in the Baltic sea region, whereas the largest cargo port of Estonia, the Port of Muuga, which is operated by the same business entity, is located in the neighboring town of Maardu. Old City Harbour has been known as a convenient harbour since the medieval times, but nowadays the cargo operations are shifted to Muuga Cargo Port and Paldiski South Harbour. As of 2010, there was still a small fleet of oceangoing trawlers that operated out of Tallinn. Tallinn's industries include shipbuilding, machine building, metal processing, electronics, textile manufacturing. BLRT Grupp has its headquarters and some subsidiaries in Tallinn. Air Maintenance Estonia and AS Panaviatic Maintenance, both based in Tallinn Airport, provide MRO services for aircraft, largely expanding their operations in recent years. Liviko, the maker of the internationally known Vana Tallinn liqueur, is similarly based in Tallinn. The headquarters of Kalev, a confectionery company and part of the industrial conglomerate Orkla Group, is located in Lehmja, near the city's southeastern boundary. Estonia is ranked third in Europe in terms of shopping centre space per inhabitant, ahead of Sweden and being surpassed only by Norway and Luxembourg.

=== Notable headquarters ===
- NATO Cooperative Cyber Defence Centre of Excellence (CCDCOE)
- eu-LISA, the European Agency for the operational management of large-scale IT systems in the area of freedom, security and justice
- Alexela
- Bolt
- Connected Baltics
- LHV

=== Notable IT development centres ===
- Telia Company IT development centre
- Kuehne + Nagel IT centre
- Arvato Financial Solutions global IT development and innovation centre
- Ericsson has one of its biggest production facilities in Europe located in Tallinn, focusing on the production of 4G communication devices.
- Equinor has announced that the group's financial centre will be relocated to Tallinn.

== Education ==
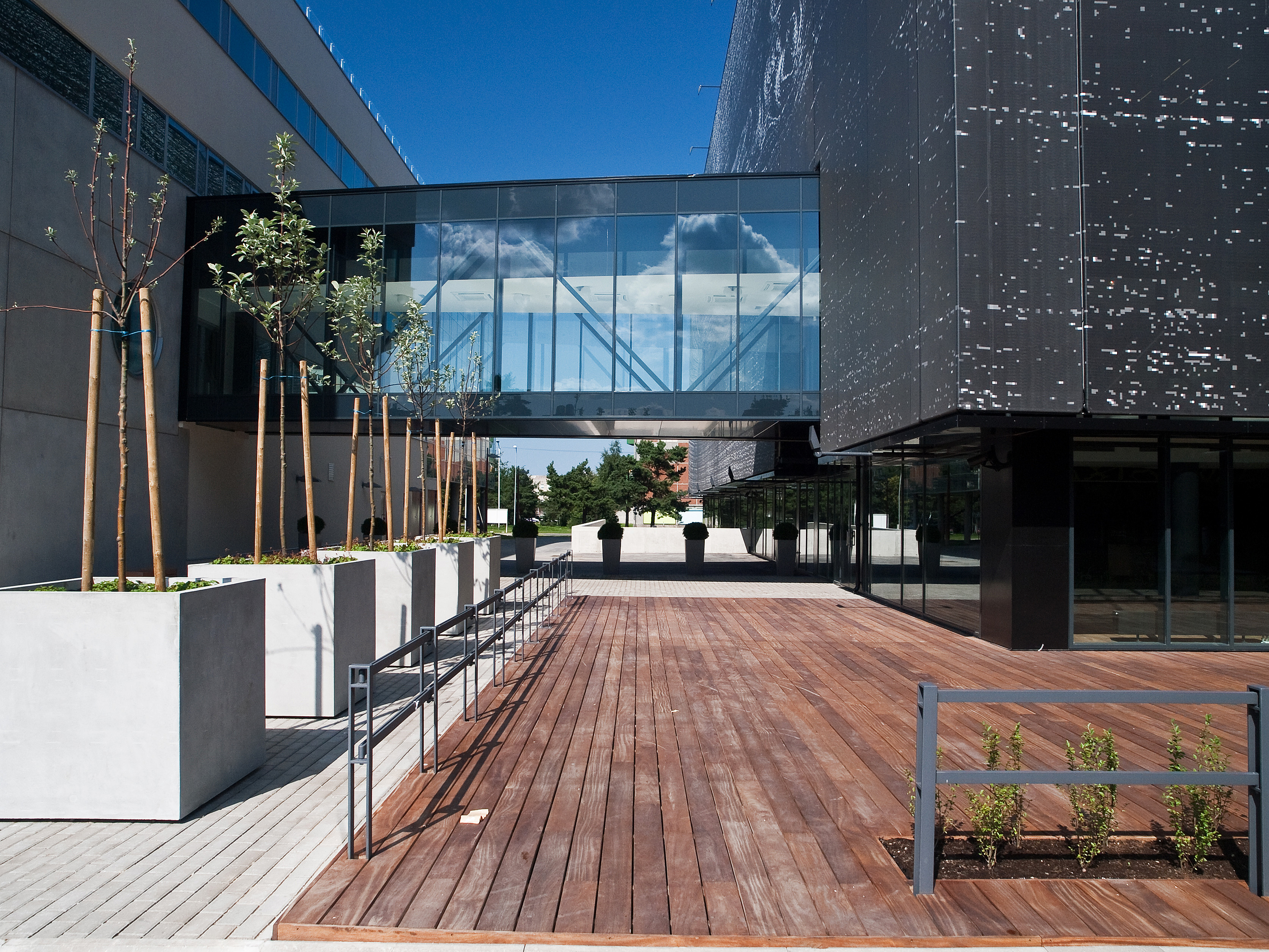
The buildings of Tallinn University of Technology

Institutions of higher education and science include:

- Baltic Film and Media School (a college of Tallinn University)
- Estonian Academy of Arts
- Estonian Academy of Security Sciences
- Estonian Academy of Music and Theatre
- Estonian Business School
- Estonian Maritime Academy (a college of Tallinn University of Technology)
- Institute of Theology of the Estonian Evangelical Lutheran Church
- National Institute of Chemical Physics and Biophysics
- Tallinn University
- Tallinn University of Technology
- Tallinn University of Applied Sciences

== Culture ==
Tallinn was a European Capital of Culture for 2011, along with Turku, Finland.

=== Museums ===
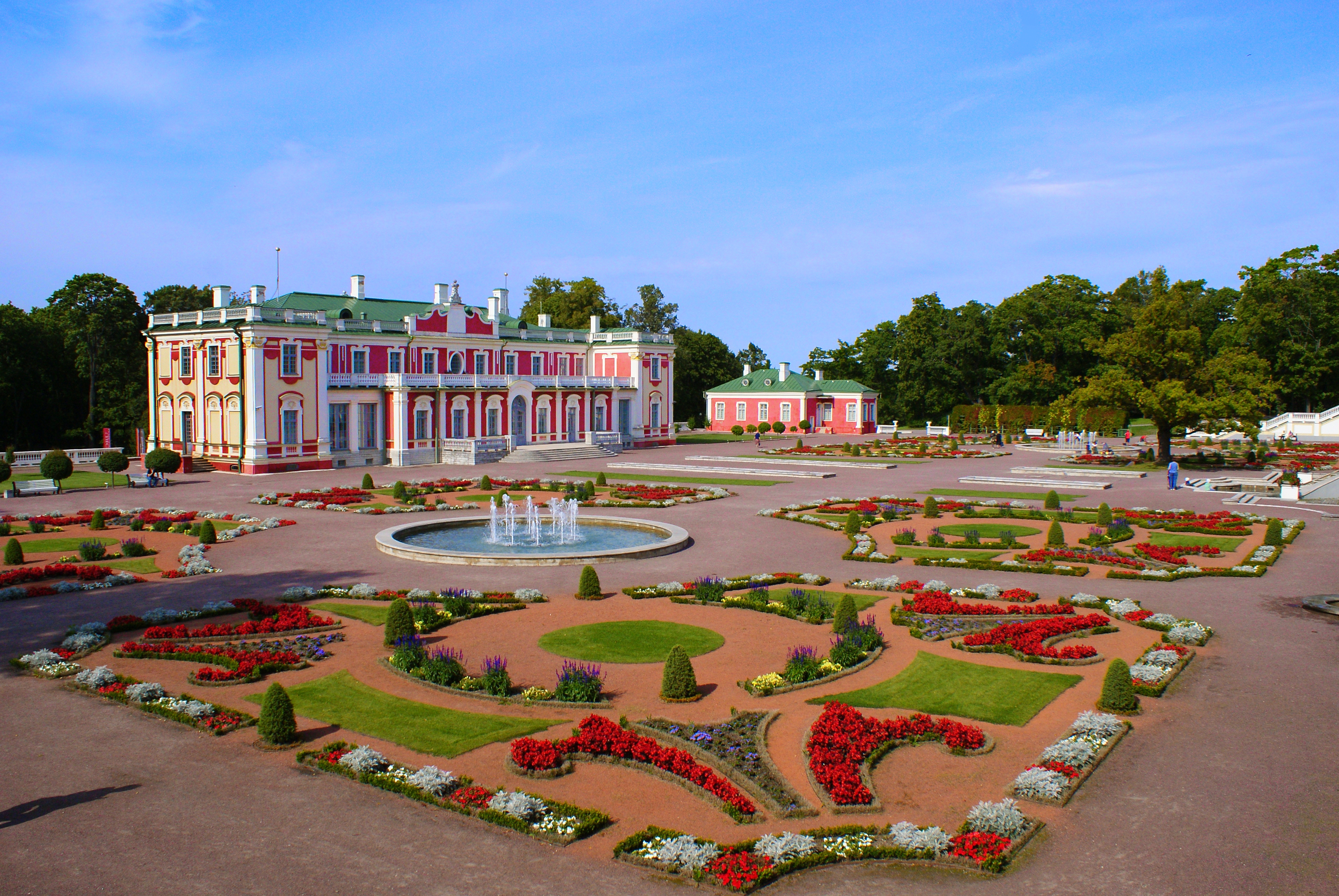
Estonian Art Museum in Kadriorg Palace

Tallinn is home to more than 60 museums and galleries. Most of them are located in Kesklinn, the central district of the city, and cover Tallinn's rich history.

The Estonian History Museum, located in the Great Guild Hall at Vanalinn, covers Estonia's history from prehistoric times up until the end of the 20th century. It features film and hands-on displays that show how Estonian dwellers lived and survived.

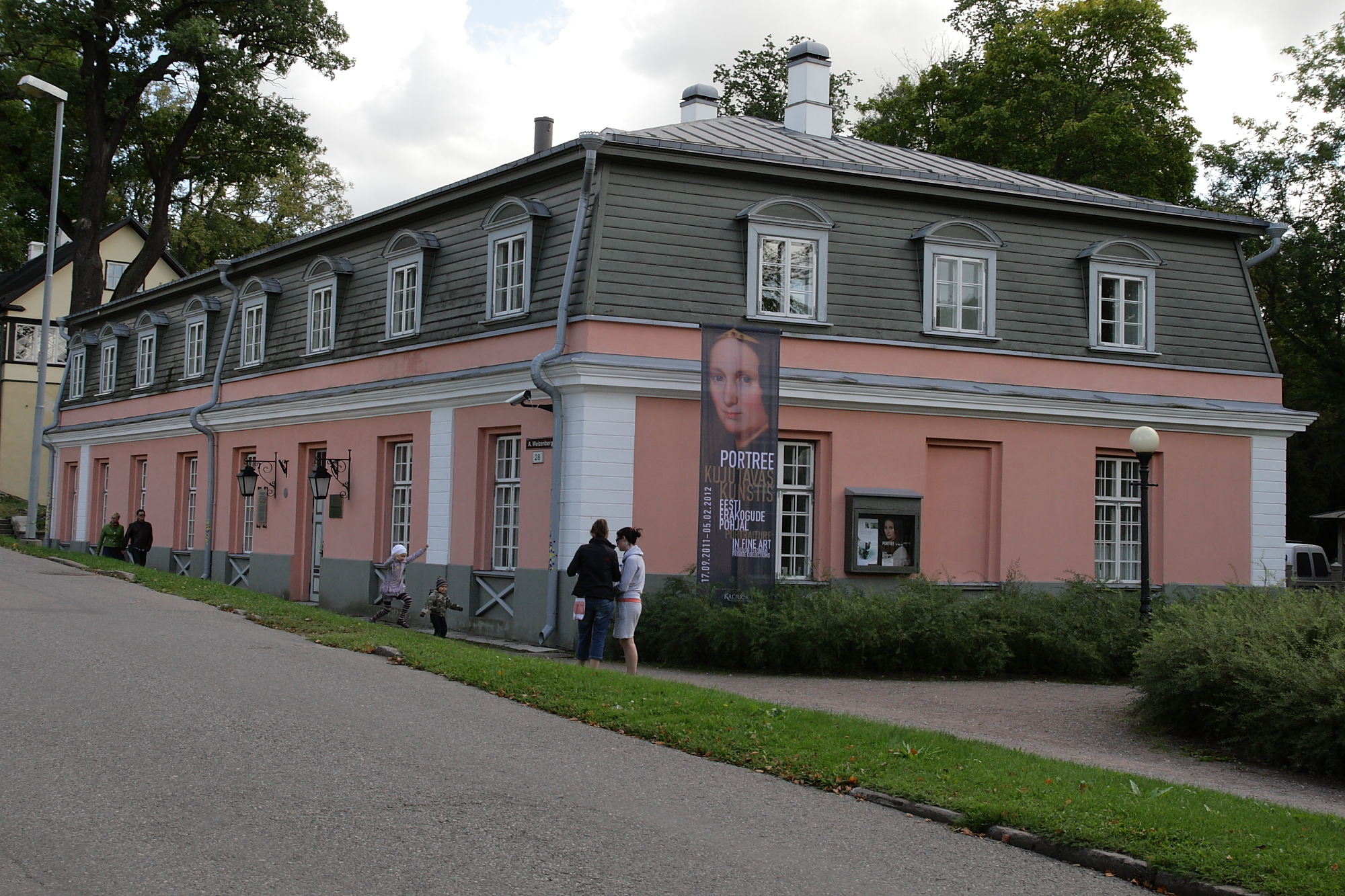
Mikkel Museum

The Estonian Maritime Museum provides an overview of the nation's seafaring past. The museum is located in the Old Town, inside one of Tallinn's former defensive structures – Fat Margaret's Tower. Another historical museum that can be found at city's Old Town, just behind the Town Hall, is Tallinn City Museum. It covers Tallinn's history from pre-history until 1991, when Estonia regained its independence. Tallinn City Museum owns nine more departments and museums around the city, one of which is Tallinn's Museum of Photography, also located just behind the Town Hall. It features a permanent exhibition that covers 100 years of photography in Estonia.

Estonia's Vabamu Museum of Occupations and Freedom is located in Kesklinn (the Central district). It covers the 51 years (1940–1991) when Estonia was occupied by the former Soviet Union and Nazi Germany. Not far away is another museum related to the Soviet occupation of Estonia, the KGB Museum, which occupies the 23rd floor of Sokos Hotel Viru. It features equipment, uniforms, and documents of Russian Secret Service agents.

The city is also home to Estonian Museum of Natural History and the Estonian Health Museum, both located in Old Town. The Museum of Natural History features several themed exhibitions that provide an overview of the wildlife of Estonia and the world. The Estonian Health Museum has exhibitions covering human anatomy, health care, and the history of medicine in Estonia on display.

Tallinn is home to several art and design museums. The Estonian Art Museum, the largest art museum in Estonia, consists of four branches – Kumu Art Museum, Kadriorg Art Museum, Mikkel Museum, and Niguliste Museum. Kumu Art Museum features the country's largest collection of contemporary and modern art. It also displays Estonian art starting from the early 18th century. Those who are interested in Western European and Russian art may enjoy Kadriorg Art Museum collections, located in Kadriorg Palace, a beautiful Baroque building erected by Peter the Great. It stores and displays about 9,000 works of art from the 16th to 20th centuries. The Mikkel Museum, in Kadriorg Park, displays a collection of mainly Western art – ceramics and Chinese porcelain donated by Johannes Mikkel in 1994. The Niguliste Museum occupies former St. Nicholas' Church; it displays collections of historical ecclesiastical art spanning nearly seven centuries from the Middle Ages to post-Reformation art.

Tallinn is also home to Fotografiska Tallinn, an international photography and visual culture institution located in the Telliskivi Creative City area. The venue presents rotating exhibitions by contemporary photographers and artists, alongside public programmes and events.

The Estonian Museum of Applied Art and Design shows Estonian contemporary designs. It displays up to 15.000 pieces of work made of textile art, ceramics, porcelain, leather, glass, jewellery, metalwork, furniture, and product design. More relaxed, culture-oriented exhibits are found at the Museum of Estonian Drinking Culture. This museum showcases the historic Luscher & Matiesen Distillery as well as the history of Estonian alcohol production.

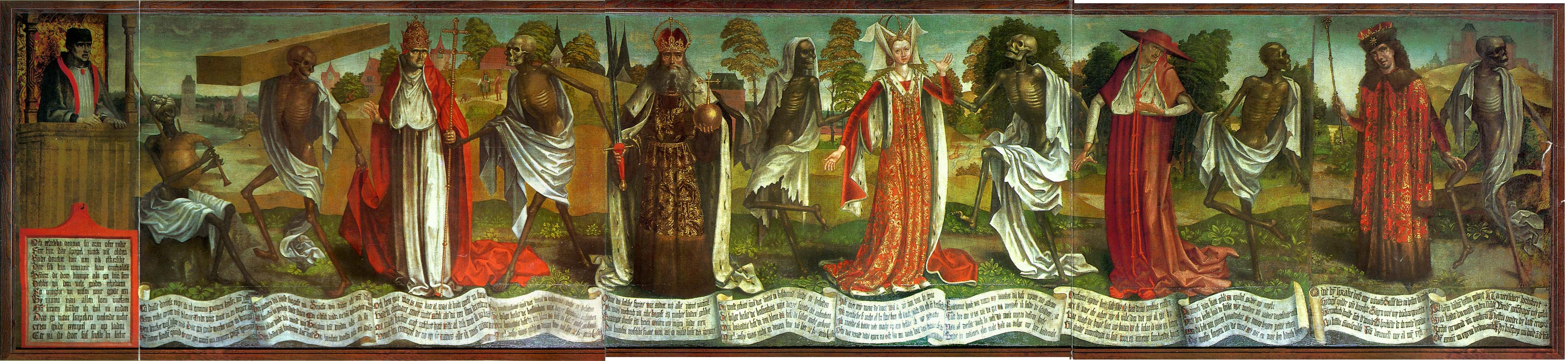
Danse Macabre by Bernt Notke on display at St. Nicholas' Church

=== Estonian Song Festival ===
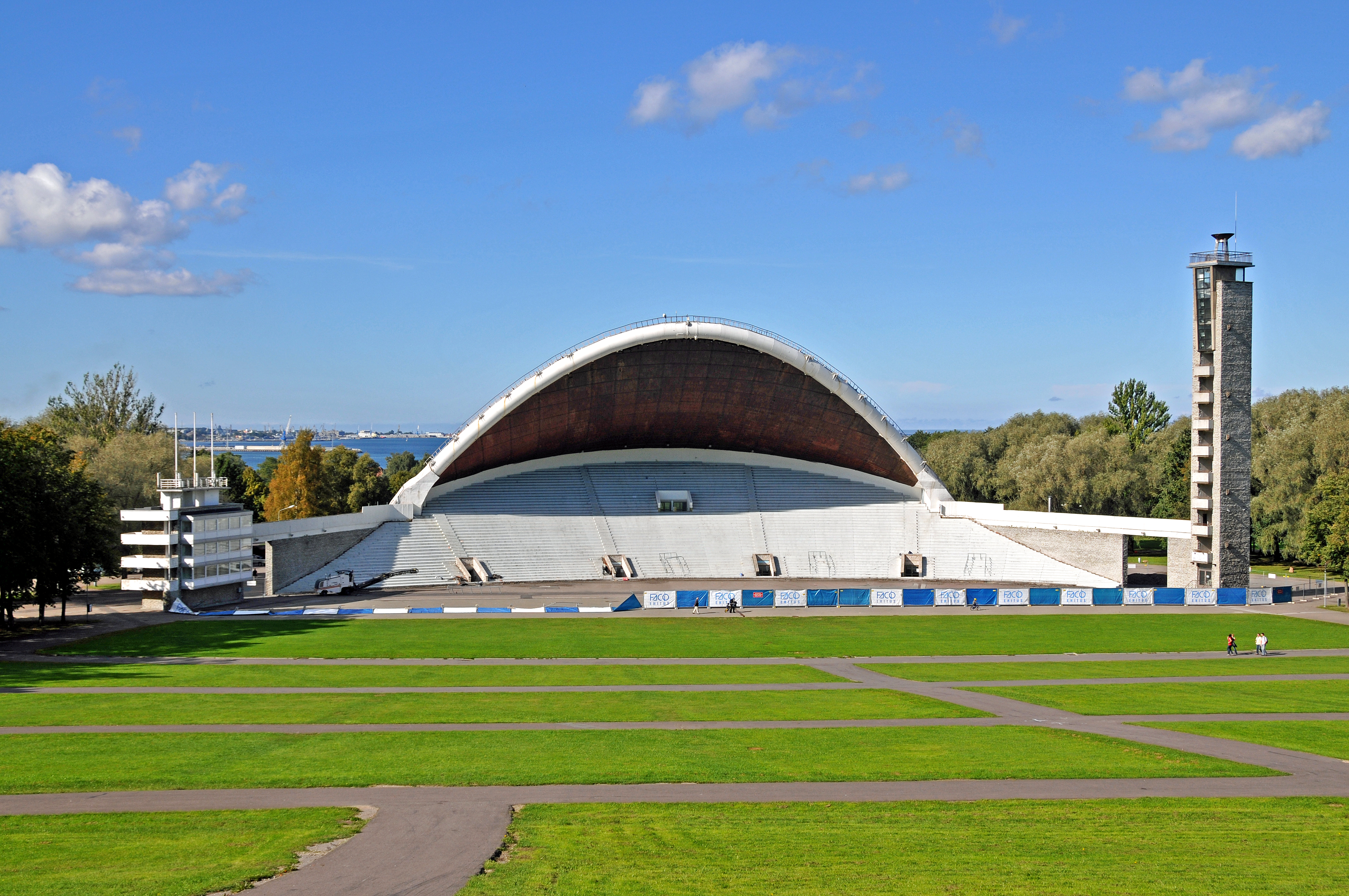
The Tallinn Song Festival Grounds (Lauluväljak)

The Estonian Song Festival (in Estonian: Laulupidu) is a large choral event, listed by the UNESCO as a Masterpiece of the Oral and Intangible Heritage of Humanity. It is held every five years in July on the Tallinn Song Festival Grounds (Lauluväljak) simultaneously with the Estonian Dance Festival. The joint choir has comprised more than 30,000 singers performing to an audience of 80,000.

Estonians have an extensive collection of folk songs, consisting of some 133,000 folk songs. From 1987, a cycle of mass demonstrations featuring spontaneous singing of national songs and hymns that were strictly forbidden during the years of the Soviet occupation to peacefully resist the oppression. In September 1988, a record 300,000 people, more than a quarter of all Estonians, gathered in Tallinn for a song festival.

=== Tallinn Black Nights Film Festival ===
Tallinn Black Nights Film Festival (Estonian: Pimedate Ööde Filmifestival, or PÖFF), is an annual film festival held since 1997 in Tallinn, the capital city of Estonia. PÖFF is the only festival in the Nordic and Baltic region with a FIAPF (International Federation of Film Producers Association) accreditation for holding an international competition programme in the Nordic and Baltic region with 14 other non-specialised festivals, such as Cannes, Berlin, Venice. With over 250 feature films screened each year and over 77500 attendances (2014), PÖFF is one of the largest film events of Northern Europe and cultural events in Estonia in the winter season. During its 19th edition in 2015 the festival screened more than 600 films (including 250+ feature-length films from 80 countries), bringing over 900 screenings to an audience of over 80, 000 people as well as over 700 accredited guests and journalists from 50 countries. In 2010 the festival held the European Film Awards ceremony in Tallinn.

=== Cuisine ===
The traditional cuisine of Tallinn reflects culinary traditions of north Estonia, the role of the city as a fishing port, and historical German influences. Numerous cafés have played a major role in a social life of the city since the 19th century, as have bars, especially in the Kesklinn district.

The martsipan industry in Tallinn has a very long history. The production of martsipan started in the Middle Ages, almost simultaneously in Tallinn (Reval) and Lübeck, both member cities of the Hanseatic League. In 1695, marzipan was mentioned as a medicine, under the designation of Panis Martius, in the price lists of the Tallinn Town Hall Pharmacy. The modern era of martsipan in Tallinn began in 1806, when the Swiss confectioner Lorenz Caviezel set up his confectionery on Pikk Street. In 1864, it was bought and expanded by Georg Stude and now is known as the Maiasmokk café. In the late 19th century martsipan figurines made by Tallinn's confectioners were supplied to the Russian imperial family.

Arguably, the most symbolic seafood dish of Tallinn is vürtsikilu ("spicy sprat") – salted sprats pickled with a distinctive set of spices including black pepper, allspice and cloves. The making of traditional vürtsikilu is thought to have originated from the city's outskirts. In 1826, the merchants of Tallinn exported 40,000 cans of vürtsikilu to Saint Petersburg. A closely associated dish is kiluvõileib ("sprat-butter-bread") – a traditional rye bread open sandwich covered with a layer of butter and vürtsikilu as the topping. Boiled egg slices and culinary herbs are optional extra toppings. Alcoholic beverages produced in the city include beer, vodka, and liqueurs (such as the eponymous Vana Tallinn). The number of craft beer breweries has expanded sharply in Tallinn over the last decade, entering local and regional markets.

== Tourism ==
Tallinn's main tourist attractions are located in the Tallinn Old Town (divided into a "lower town" and Toompea hill) which is easily explored on foot. The eastern parts of the city, notably Pirita (with Pirita Convent) and Kadriorg (with Kadriorg Palace) districts, are also popular destinations, and the Estonian Open Air Museum in Rocca al Mare, west of the city, preserves aspects of Estonian rural culture and architecture. The historical wooded suburbs like Kalamaja, Pelgulinn, Kassisaba and Kelmiküla and revitalized industrial areas like Rotermanni Quarter, Noblessner and Dvigatel are also unique places to visit.

=== Toompea – Upper Town ===
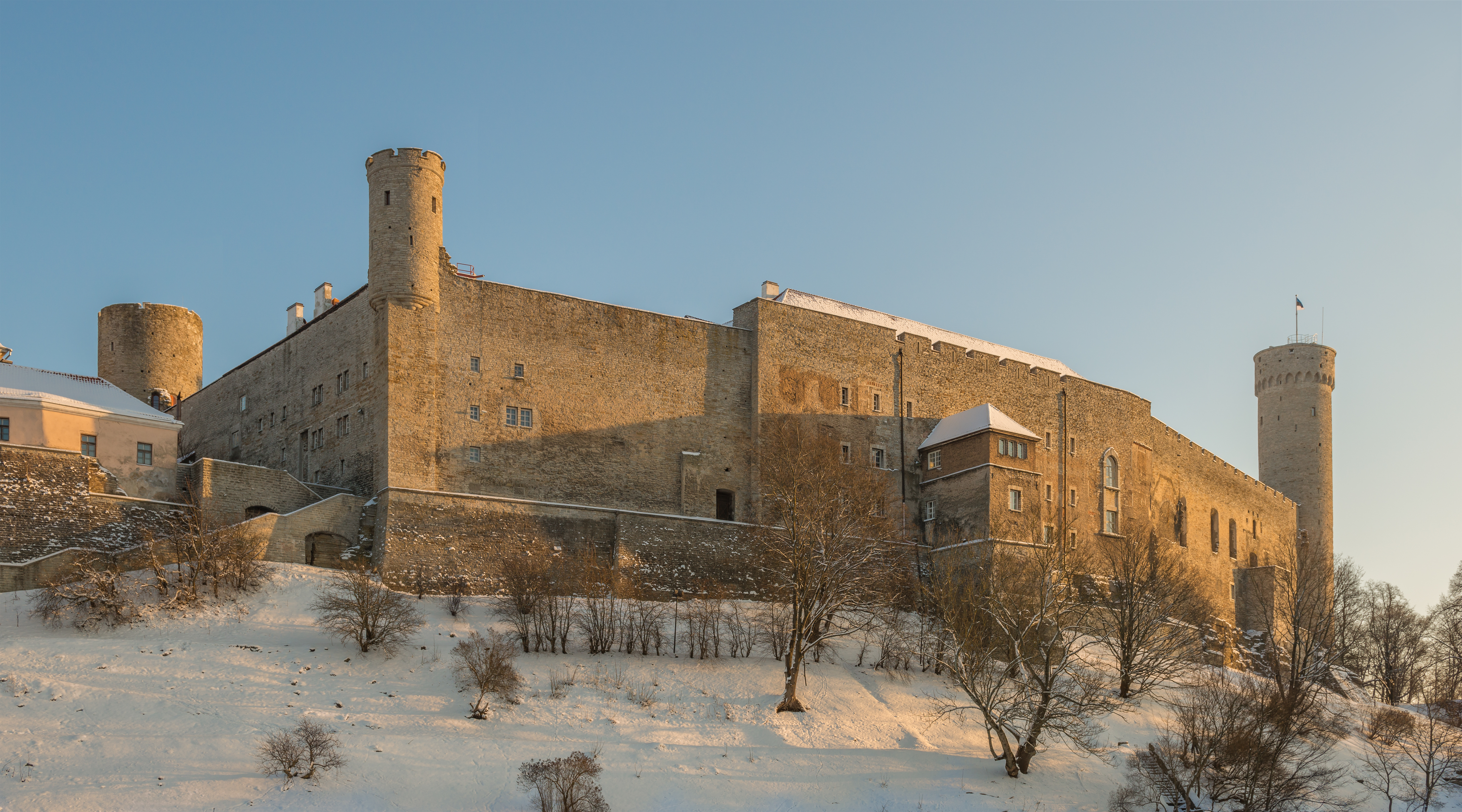
Toompea castle

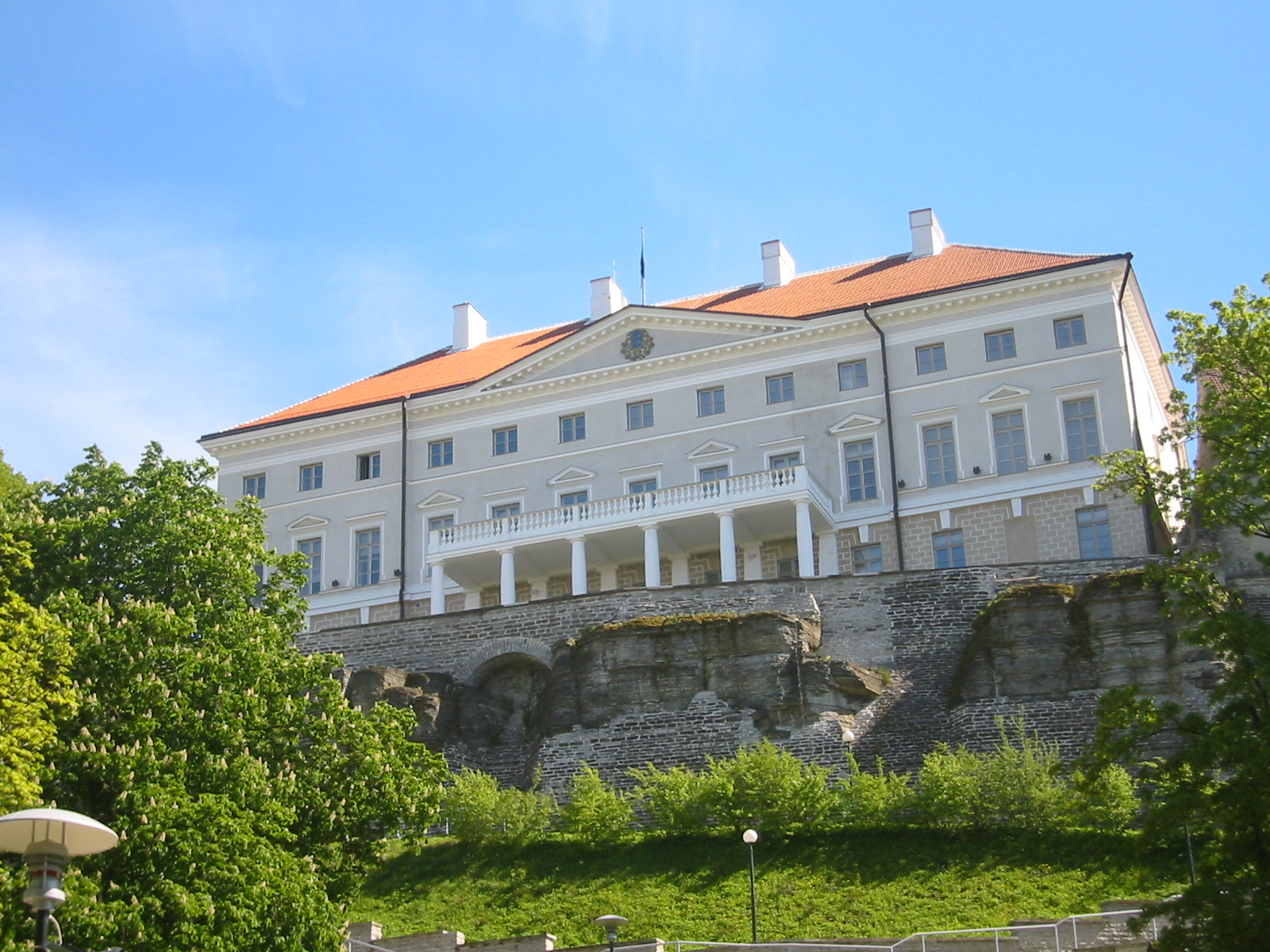
Stenbock House on Toompea hill is the official seat of the Government of Estonia.

This area was once an almost separate town, heavily fortified, and has always been the seat of governing power in Estonia. The hill occupies an easily defensible site overlooking the surrounding districts. The major attractions are the medieval Toompea Castle (today housing the Estonian Parliament, the Riigikogu), the Lutheran St Mary's Cathedral, also known as the Dome Church (Estonian: Toomkirik), and the Russian Orthodox Alexander Nevsky Cathedral.

=== All-linn – Lower Town ===
This area is one of the best preserved medieval towns in Europe and the authorities are continuing its rehabilitation. Major sights include the Town Hall square (Estonian: Raekoja plats), the city wall and towers (notably "Fat Margaret" and "Kiek in de Kök") as well as a number of medieval churches, including St Olaf's, St. Nicholas' and the Church of the Holy Ghost. The Catholic Cathedral of St Peter and St Paul is also in the Lower Town.

=== Kadriorg ===
The neighborhood of Kadriorg is 2 kilometres (1.2 miles) east of the city centre and is served by buses and trams. Kadriorg Palace, the former palace of Peter the Great, built just after the Great Northern War, today houses the foreign art department of the Art Museum of Estonia, the presidential residence and the surrounding grounds include formal gardens and woodland.

The main building of the Art Museum of Estonia, Kumu (Estonian: Kunstimuuseum, Art Museum), was built in 2006 and lies in Kadriorg park. It houses an encyclopaedic collection of Estonian art, including paintings by Carl Timoleon von Neff, Johann Köler, Eduard Ole, Jaan Koort, Konrad Mägi, Eduard Wiiralt, Henn Roode and Adamson-Eric, among others.

=== Pirita ===
This coastal district is a further 2 kilometres north-east of Kadriorg. The marina was built for the Moscow Olympics of 1980, and boats can be hired on the Pirita River. Two kilometres inland are the Botanic Gardens and the Tallinn TV Tower.

== Transport ==
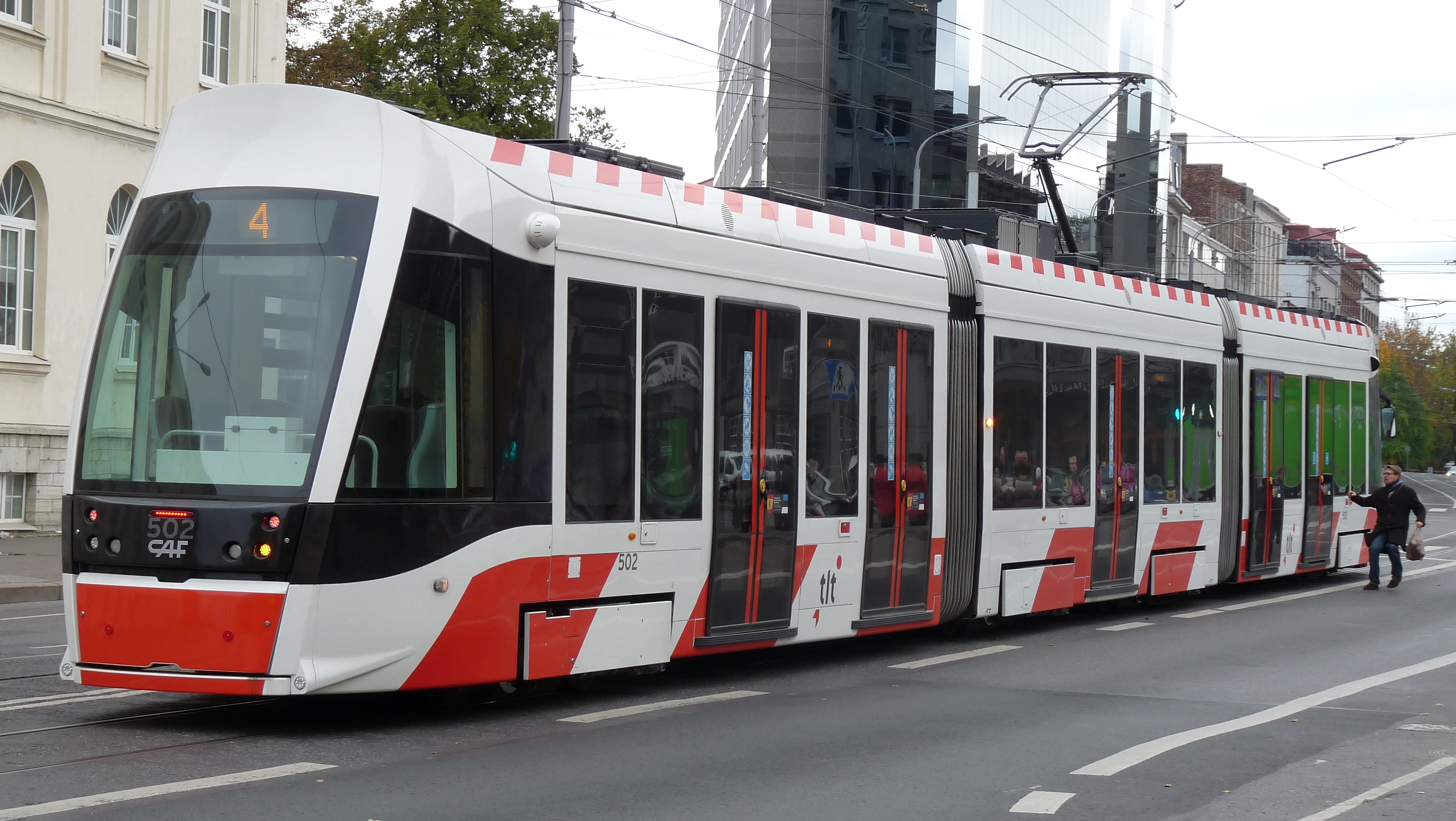
A CAF tram in Tallinn (Pärnu maantee street) in 2018

=== City transport ===
The city operates a system of bus (73 lines), tram (5 lines) and trolleybus (4 lines) routes to all districts; the 48 kilometres (30 mi) long tram system is the only tram network in Estonia. A flat-fare system is used, with discounted travel available for certain concession groups. The ticket-system is based on prepaid RFID cards available in kiosks and post offices. In January 2013, Tallinn became the first European capital to offer a fare-free service on buses, trams and trolleybuses within the city limits. This service is available to residents who register with the municipality.

Tallinn offers a wide range of smart mobility options, such as e-scooters, e-bikes, bikes, and cars.

=== Air ===
The Lennart Meri Tallinn Airport is about 4 kilometres (2 miles) from Town Hall square (Raekoja plats). There is a tram (lines 2 and 4) and city bus (no. 2 and 15) connection between the airport and the city centre. The nearest railway station Ülemiste is only 1.5 km (0.9 mi) from the airport. The construction of the new section of the airport began in 2007 and was finished in summer 2008.

=== Ferry ===
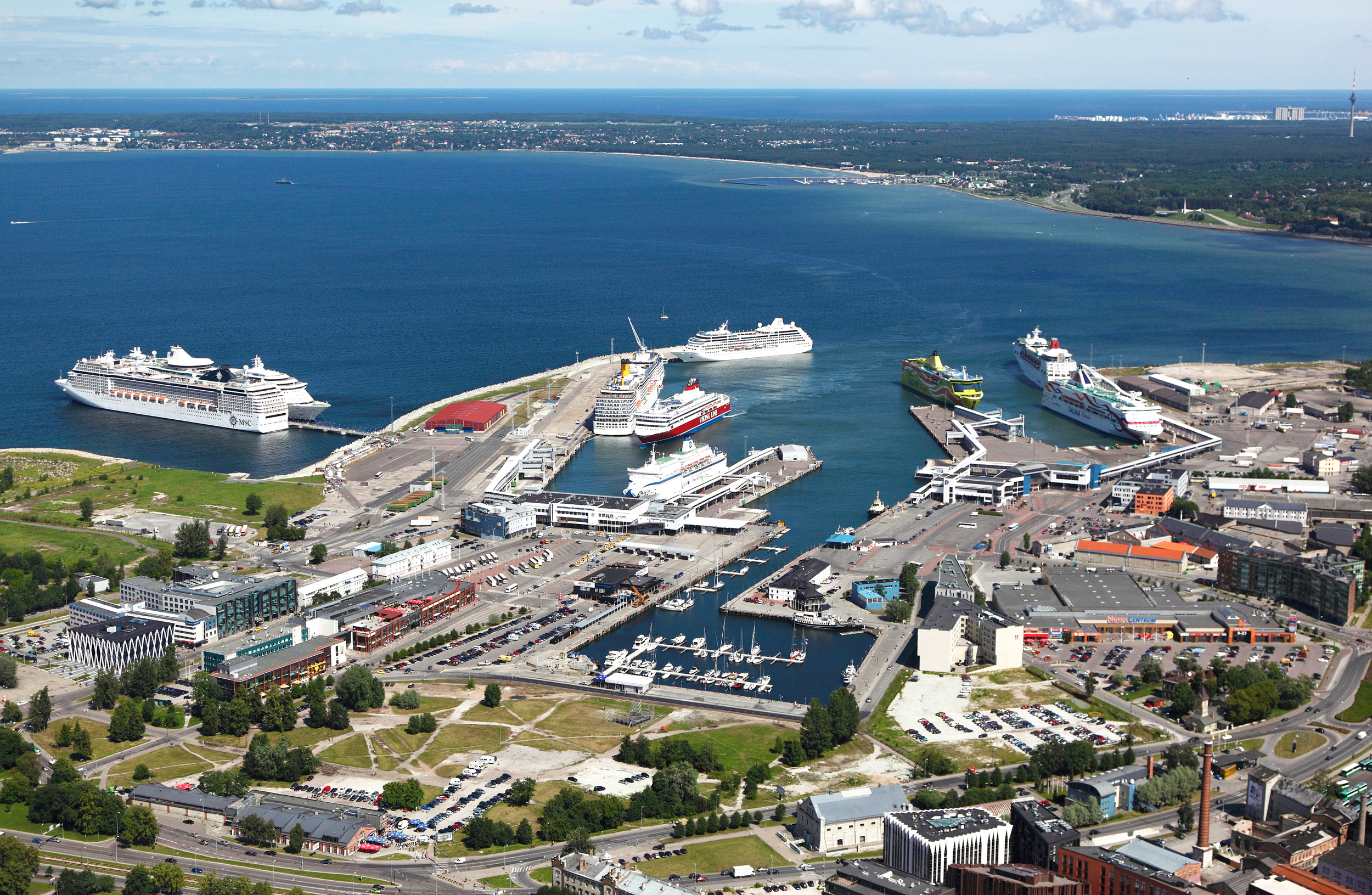
The port of Tallinn is one of the busiest cruise and passenger harbours in Northern Europe with over 10 million people passing through in 2016.

Several ferry operators, including Viking Line, Tallink and Eckerö Line, connect Tallinn to Helsinki, Mariehamn and Stockholm. Passenger lines connect Tallinn to Helsinki (83 km (52 mi) north of Tallinn) in approximately 2–3.5 hours by cruiseferries, with up to eight daily crossings all year round.

=== Rail ===
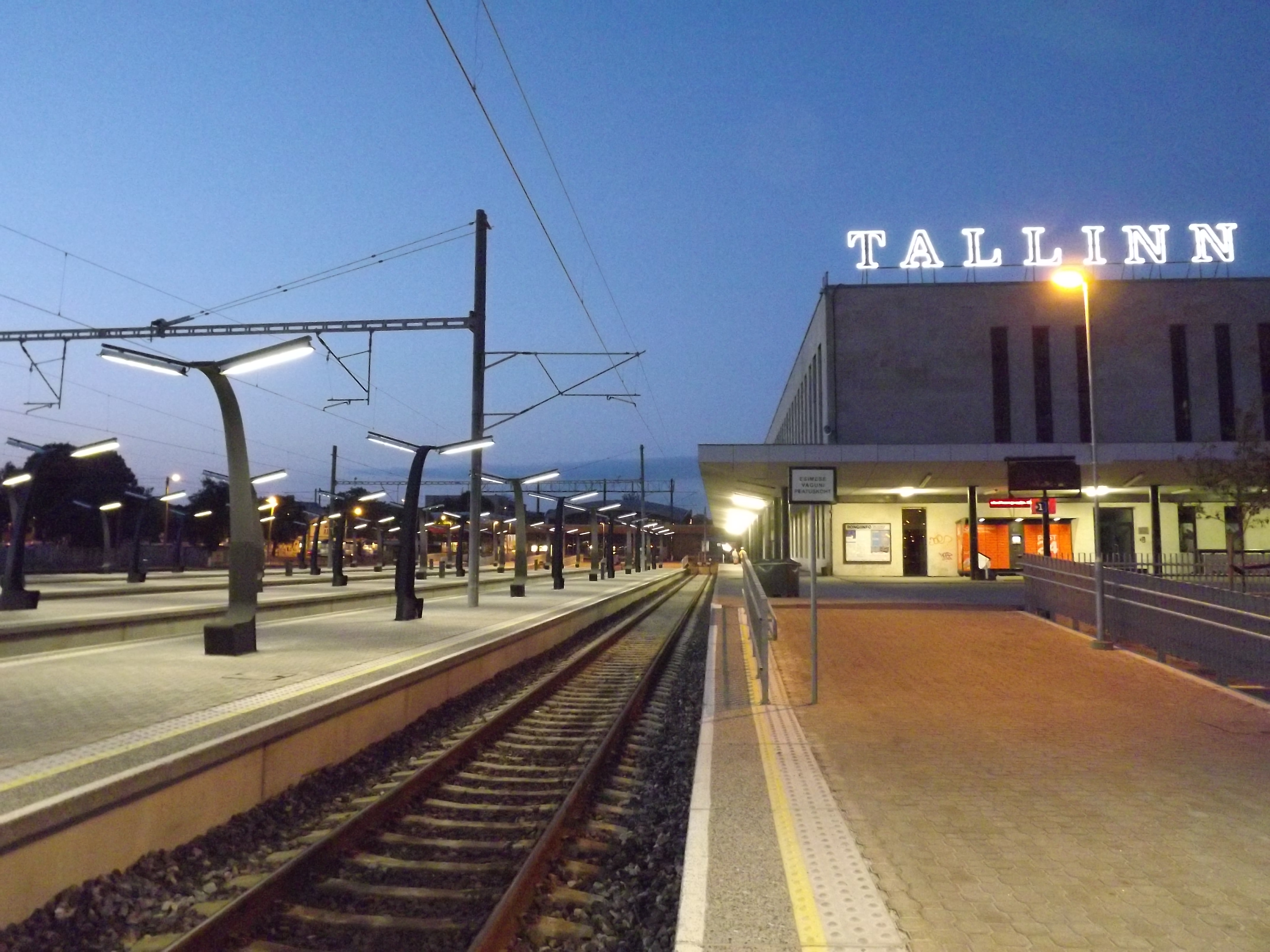
Railway platform at the Tallinn Baltic Station

The Elron railway company operates train services from Tallinn to Tartu, Valga, Türi, Viljandi, Tapa, Narva, Koidula. There are also international services to Riga, Latvia and Vilnius, Lithuania, although passengers must change trains at Valga. Buses are also available to all these and various other destinations in Estonia, as well as to Saint Petersburg in Russia. The Russian railways company operated a daily international sleeper train service between Tallinn – Moscow, but this was stopped in 2020.

Tallinn also has a commuter rail service running from Tallinn's main rail station in two main directions: east (Aegviidu) and to several western destinations (Pääsküla, Keila, Riisipere, Turba, Paldiski, and Kloogaranna). These are electrified lines and are used by the Elron railroad company. Stadler FLIRT EMU and DMU units have been in service since July 2013, as well as Škoda 21Ev EMU units since December 2025. The first electrified train service in Tallinn was opened in 1924 from Tallinn to Pääsküla, a distance of 11.2 km (7.0 mi).

The Rail Baltica project, which will link Tallinn with Warsaw via Latvia and Lithuania, will connect Tallinn with the rest of the European rail network. An undersea tunnel has been proposed between Tallinn and Helsinki, though it remains at a planning phase.

=== Roads ===
The Via Baltica motorway (part of Estonian national road 4 from Tallinn to Ikla, the Estonian-Latvian border and European route E67 from Helsinki to Prague) connects Tallinn to the Lithuanian-Polish border through Latvia.

Tallinn's semi-orbital ringroad, the T11, is 38km long and runs from the Lasnamäe subdistrict of Väo in the east to Keila in the west. It is mostly dual carriageway and has been steadily upgraded since 2012 to meet rising traffic demands. Aside from a small section at the start in Lasnamäe, the road runs entirely outside of Tallinn.

Tallinn is the starting point for Estonian national road 1, Estonian national road 2, Estonian national road 4, Estonian national road 8, Estonian national road 15 and a few secondary roads leading to neighbouring municipalities and towns.

== Notable people ==
=== Pre-1900 ===
- Michael Sittow (ca. 1469–1525), court portrait painter for Habsburgs and other royal houses, a most important Early Netherlandish painter
- Count Jacob De la Gardie (1583–1652), statesman and a field marshal of Sweden
- Magnus Gabriel De la Gardie (1622–1686), a Swedish statesman and military officer
- Jacob Johan Hastfer (1647–1695), officer and provincial governor of Swedish Livonia from 1687 to 1695
- Otto von Kotzebue (1787–1846), officer of Imperial Russian Navy, explorer of Oceania
- Alexander Friedrich von Hueck (1802–1842), professor of anatomy at University of Tartu, a notable estophile
- Franz Anton Schiefner (1817–1879), linguist and tibetologist
- Julius Iversen (1823–1900), phalerist and professor of Greek and Latin
- Carl Hiekisch (1840–1901), geographer
- Edmund Russow (1841–1897), biologist, researcher of plant anatomy and histology
- Alexandrine von Wistinghausen (1850-c. 1914–18), landscape painter
- Kristjan Raud (1865–1943), symbolist painter, known for his art style of the primitivism
- A. H. Tammsaare (1878–1940), writer whose pentalogy Truth and Justice (Tõde ja õigus) is considered "The Estonian Novel"
- Marie Under (1883–1980), poet, nominated for the Nobel Prize in Literature multiple times
- Alfred Rosenberg (1893–1946), leading Nazi German ideologue, head of Reich Ministry for the Occupied Eastern Territories, executed for war crimes

=== 1900 to 1930 ===
- Ants Oras (1900–1982), translator and writer. He studied pause patterns in English Renaissance dramatic blank verse.
- Vidrik "Frits" Rootare (1906–1981), chess player
- Andrus Johani (1906–1941), painter
- Miliza Korjus (1909–1980), Polish-Estonian-American opera singer, Hollywood film actress, nominee for Academy Award for Best Supporting Actress in 1938
- Edmund S. Valtman (1914–2005), Estonian-American cartoonist. He won the 1962 Pulitzer Prize for Editorial Cartooning.
- Evald Okas (1915–2011), painter, probably best known for his portraits of nudes
- Evi Rauer (1915–2004), stage, film and television actress and television director
- Paul Kuusberg (1916–2003), writer, particularly of novellas
- Helga Sonck-Majewski (1916–2015), Finnish artist
- Ellen Liiger (1918–1987), stage, TV, radio and film actress and theatre teacher
- Udo Kasemets (1919–2014), Estonian-born Canadian composer of orchestral, vocal, piano and electroacoustic works
- Jaan Kross (1920–2007), novelist, nominated for the Nobel Prize in Literature multiple times
- Vincent Zigas (1920–1983), medical officer in Papua New Guinea during the 1950s
- Harry Männil (1920–2010), Estonian-Venezuelan businessman and art collector
- Kaljo Raid (1921–2005), composer, cellist and pastor
- Sir Arvi Parbo (1926–2019), Estonian-Australian business executive
- Vello Viisimaa (1928–1991), opera singer and stage actor, appeared mostly in operettas
- Olaf von Wrangel (1928–2009), German journalist (NDR) and politician, member of German Bundestag
- Lennart Georg Meri (1929–2006), politician, writer, film director and statesman, second President of Estonia, 1992 to 2001
- Eino Tamberg (1930–2010), composer, promoter of neoclassicism in Estonian music

=== 1930 to 1950 ===
- Uno Loop (1930–2021), singer, musician, athlete, actor and educator
- Vladimir-Georg Karasjov-Orgusaar (1931–2015), film director, member of the Congress of Estonia
- Jaan Puhvel (1932–2026), Estonian-American Indo-Europeanist and mythographer
- Martin Puhvel (1933–2016), literature researcher, professor emeritus at McGill University for old and medieval English literature
- Ain-Elmar Kaasik (1934–2026), neurologist, neurosurgeon and academic
- Ingrid Rüütel (born 1935), folklorist and philologist, wife of former president Arnold Rüütel
- Peter Peet Silvester (1935–1996), electrical engineer, particularly numerical analysis of electromagnetic fields
- Jüri Arrak (1936–2022), artist and painter
- Urve Karuks (1936–2015), Canadian-Estonian poet and translator
- Enn Vetemaa (1936–2017), writer, master of the Estonian Modernist short novel
- Arvo Antonovich Mets (1937–1997), Russian poet, master of Russian free verse
- Mikk Mikiver (1937–2006), stage and film actor and theater director
- Linnart Mäll (1938–2010), historian, orientalist, translator and politician
- Mai Murdmaa (1938–2026), Estonian choreographer, ballet dancer and director
- Ene Riisna (born 1938), Estonian-born American television producer, known for her work on the American news show 20/20
- Andres Tarand (born 1940), politician, former prime minister and MEP
- Leila Säälik (born 1941), stage, film and radio actress
- Paul-Eerik Rummo (born 1942), poet and politician
- Eili Sild (born 1942), stage, film, television and radio actress
- Kalle Lasn (born 1942), Estonian-Canadian film maker, author, magazine editor and activist
- Urjo Kareda (1944–2001), Canadian theatre, music critic, dramaturge and stage director
- Mari Lill (born 1945), stage, film and TV actress
- Sulev Mäeltsemees (born 1947), public administration and local government scholar
- Siiri Oviir (born 1947), politician and former Member of the European Parliament
- Lepo Sumera (1950–2000), composer, teacher and politician

=== 1950 to 1970 ===
- Urmas Alender (1953–1994), singer and musician
- Ivo Lill (1953–2019), glass artist
- Ain Lutsepp (born 1954), actor and politician
- Kalle Randalu (born 1956), pianist
- Alexander Goldstein (1957–2006), Russian-Jewish writer and essayist
- Peeter Järvelaid (born 1957), legal scholar, historian and university professor
- Doris Kareva (born 1958), poet and head of Estonian National Commission in UNESCO
- Anu Lamp (born 1958), stage, film, TV, voice actress and stage director
- Tõnu Õnnepalu (born 1962), pen names Emil Tode and Anton Nigov, poet and author
- Tõnis Lukas (born 1962), politician, former government minister
- Marina Kaljurand (born 1962), politician, MEP, former government minister
- Kiiri Tamm (born 1962), stage, television and film actress and stage manager
- Tõnu Trubetsky (born 1963), punk rock musician, film and music video director
- Ivo Uukkivi (born 1965), stage, film, radio, TV actor and producer
- Liina Tennosaar (born 1965), stage, film and television actress
- Juhan Parts (born 1966), politician, former prime minister
- Mart Sander (born 1967), singer, actor, director, author, artist and TV host
- Indrek Sirel (born 1970), military officer, general

=== 1970 to date ===
- Jaan Tallinn (born 1972), investor and entrepreneur (co-managed Skype and other projects)
- Jan Uuspõld (born 1973), stage, television, radio and film actor and musician
- Oksana Yermakova (born 1973), Estonian and Russian Olympic champion épée fencer
- Urmas Paet (born 1974), politician and Member of the European Parliament
- Ken-Marti Vaher (born 1974), politician, former government minister
- Urmas Reinsalu (born 1975), politician, former government minister
- Kristen Michal (born 1975), politician, Prime Minister of Estonia since 2024
- Mailis Reps (born 1975), politician, former government minister
- Harriet Toompere (born 1975), stage, television, film actress and writer of children's books
- Kaja Kallas (born 1977), politician, former Prime Minister of Estonia (2021–2024)
- Katrin Pärn (born 1977), stage, film and television actress and singer
- Johann Urb (born 1977), Estonian-born American actor, producer and model
- Carmen Kass (born 1978), supermodel
- Lauri Lagle (born 1981), stage and film actor, screenwriter, director and playwright
- Ursula Ratasepp (born 1982), stage, film and TV actress
- Ott Sepp (born 1982), actor, singer, writer and TV presenter
- Katrin Siska (born 1983), musician
- Priit Loog (born 1984), stage, TV and film actor
- Robert Kurvitz (born 1984), novelist, video game designer, and musician
- Tiiu Kuik (born 1987), supermodel
- Pääru Oja (born 1989), stage, film, voice and TV actor
- Klaudia Tiitsmaa (born 1990), stage, TV and film actress
- Tommy Cash (born 1991), rapper

=== Architects and conductors ===
- Valve Pormeister (1922–2002), architect
- Allan Murdmaa (1934–2009), architect
- Neeme Järvi (born 1937), Estonian-American conductor
- Eri Klas (1939–2016), conductor, leader of the Netherlands Radio Symphony Orchestra
- Tõnu Kaljuste (born 1953), conductor, former conductor of the Estonian National Opera
- Andres Mustonen (born 1953), conductor and violinist, artistic director
- Andres Siim (born 1962), architect, designer
- Paavo Järvi (born 1962), conductor, son of conductor Neeme Järvi
- Margit Mutso (born 1966), architect, designer
- Elmo Tiisvald (born 1967), conductor
- Ülar Mark (born 1968), architect and urban planner
- Kaisa Roose (born 1969), music conductor with Malmö Opera and Music Theatre
- Siiri Vallner (born 1972), architect, designer of the Museum of Occupations in Tallinn
- Anu Tali (born 1972), conductor, music director of the Sarasota Orchestra
- Eero Endjärv (born 1973), architect
- Katrin Koov (born 1973), architect
- Mikk Murdvee (born 1980), Estonian-Finnish conductor and violinist.

=== Sport ===
- Albert Kusnets (1902–1942), middleweight Greco-Roman wrestler. He competed in the 1924 and 1928 Summer Olympics.
- Valter Palm (1905–1994), welterweight professional boxer. He competed in 1924 and 1928 Summer Olympics.
- Raido Rüütel (born 1951), racing driver
- Joel Tammeka (born 1951), rally driver
- Robert Lepikson (born 1952), politician and rally driver
- Toomas Krõm (born 1971), footballer
- Gert Kullamäe (born 1971), professional basketball player
- Toomas Kallaste (born 1971), footballer
- Indrek Pertelson (born 1971) judoka, bronze winner at the 2000 and 2004 Summer Olympics.
- Mart Poom (born 1972), footballer and coach, goalkeeping coach of Estonia national football team
- Oksana Yermakova (born 1973), Estonian and Russian Olympic champion épée fencer
- Martin Müürsepp (born 1974), basketball player and coach
- Sergei Pareiko (born 1977), footballer (goalkeeper)
- Andres Oper (born 1977), footballer and coach
- Kristen Viikmäe (born 1979), footballer
- Gerd Kanter (born 1979), discus thrower
- Urmo Aava (born 1979), rally driver
- Irina Embrich (born 1980), épée fencer
- Joel Lindpere (born 1981), footballer
- Sten Pentus (born 1981), racing driver
- Toomas Triisa (born 1982), rally driver
- Antti Rammo (born 1983), racing driver
- Marko Asmer (born 1984), racing driver
- Remy Põld (born 1992), basketball player
- Karl Kruuda (born 1992), rally driver
- Kevin Korjus (born 1993), racing driver
- Anett Kontaveit (born 1995), tennis player, highest-ranked Estonian singles player ever
- Martin Rump (born 1996), racing driver
- Ralf Aron (born 1998), racing driver
- Georg Linnamäe (born 1998), rally driver
- Jüri Vips (born 2000), racing driver (FIA Formula 2 Championship)
- Paul Aron (born 2004), racing driver

== Twin towns – sister cities ==
Tallinn is twinned with:

- Annapolis, United States
- Beijing, China
- Berlin, Germany
- Dartford, United Kingdom
- Ghent, Belgium
- Groningen, The Netherlands
- Hangzhou, China
- Helsinki, Finland
- Kiel, Germany
- Kyiv, Ukraine
- Kotka, Finland
- Malmö, Sweden
- Odesa, Ukraine
- Riga, Latvia
- Schwerin, Germany
- Skopje, North Macedonia
- (Georgia (country)) Tbilisi, Georgia
- Turku, Finland
- Venice, Italy
- Vienna, Austria
- Vilnius, Lithuania

== Gallery ==
Seal of Reval, 1340

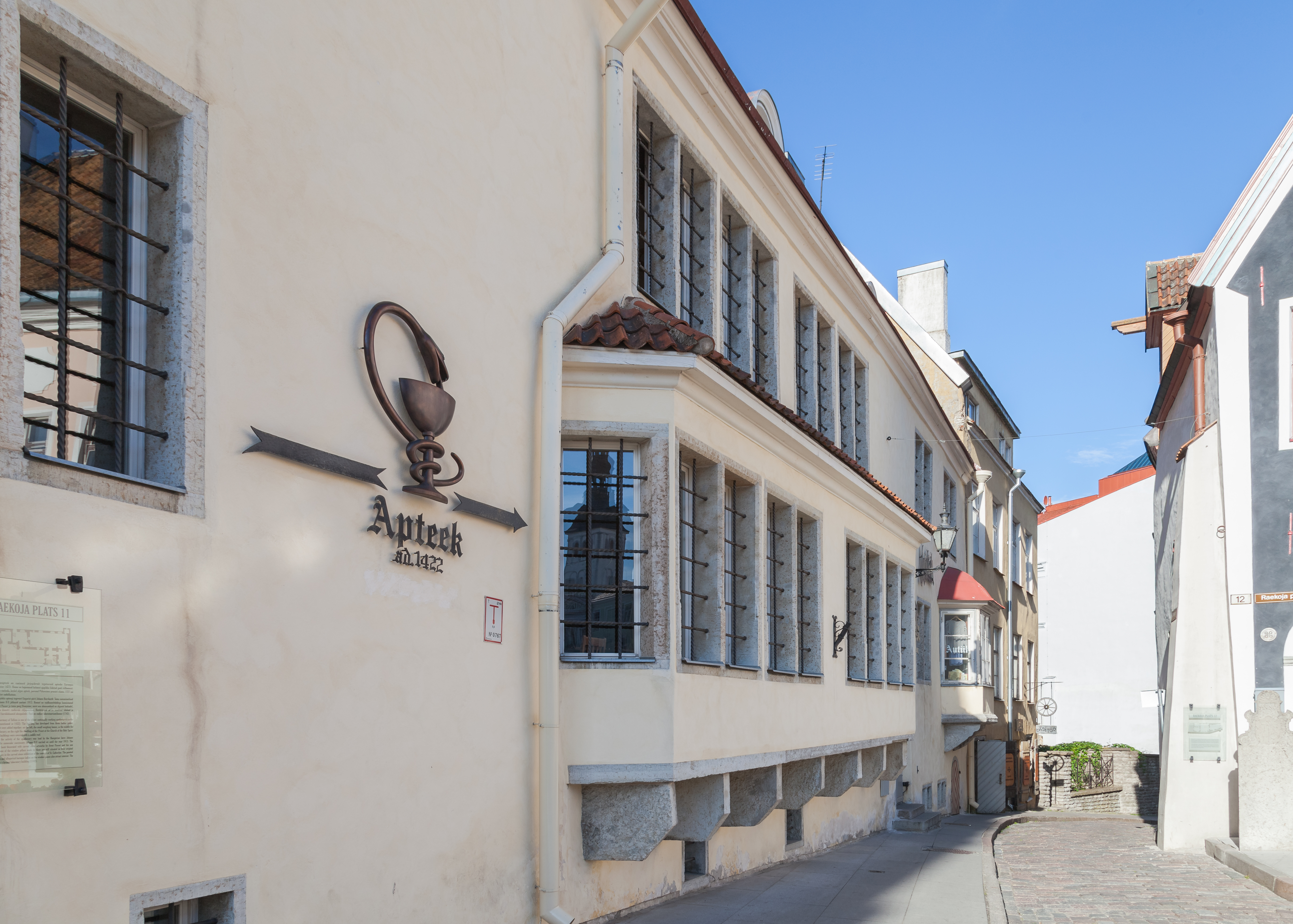
The Raeapteek, built in 1422, is one of the oldest continuously running pharmacies in Europe.

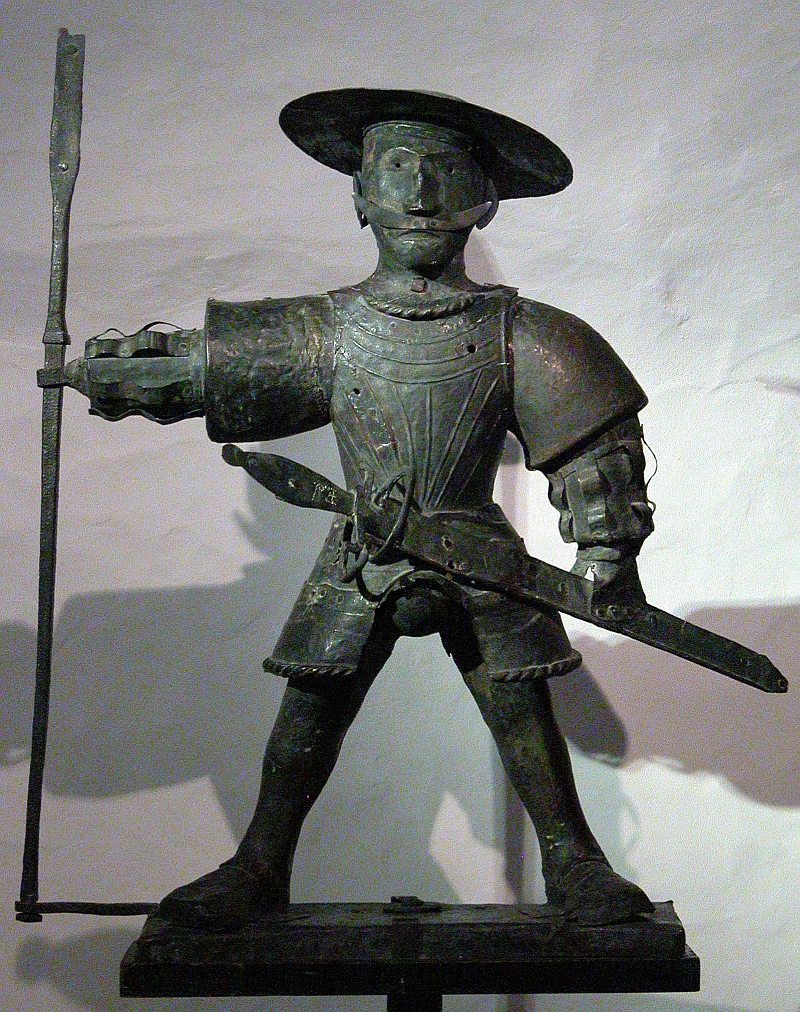
The Old Thomas weather vane was put on top of Tallinn Town Hall in 1530 and is the city's symbolic guardian.

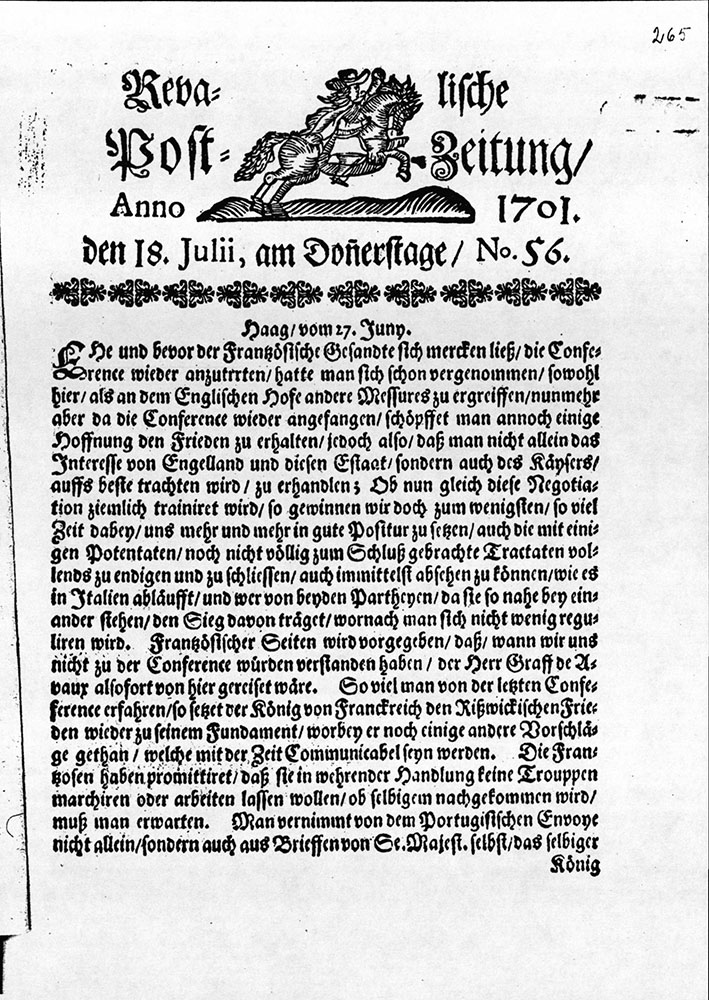
A front page of Revalsche Post-Zeitung (newspaper published 1689–1710)

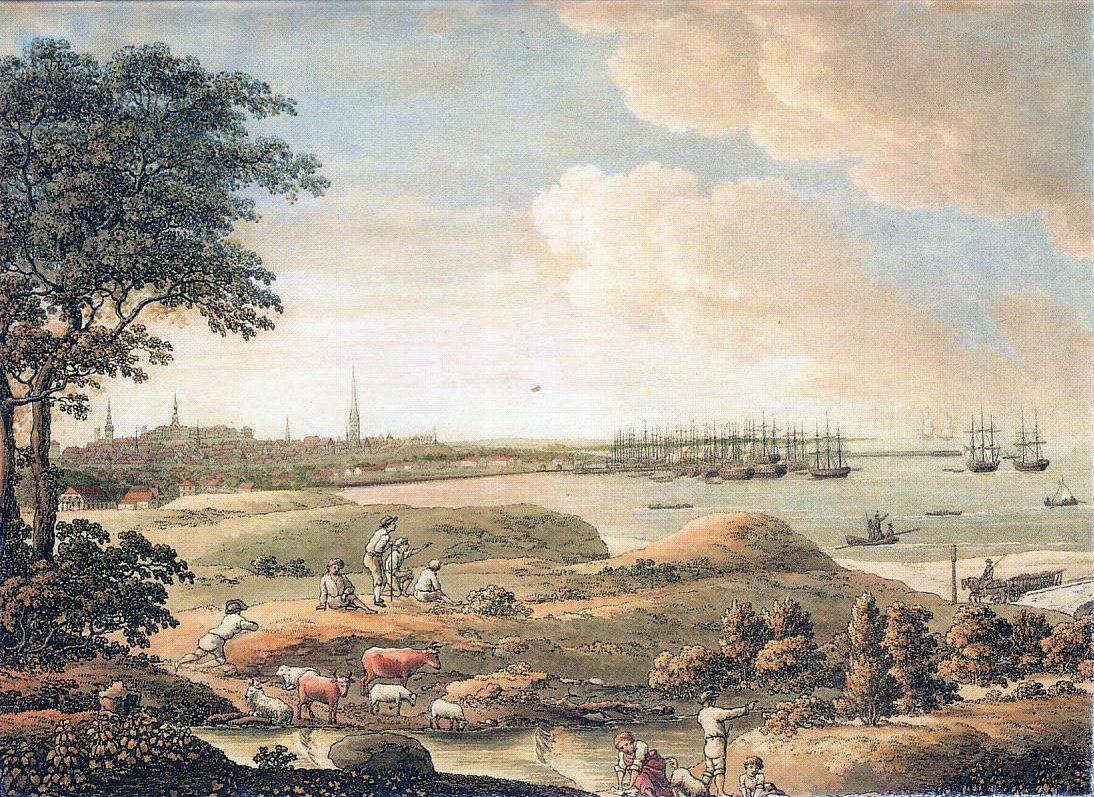
Anonymous artist's view of Tallinn in 1816 (later reprint on postcard)

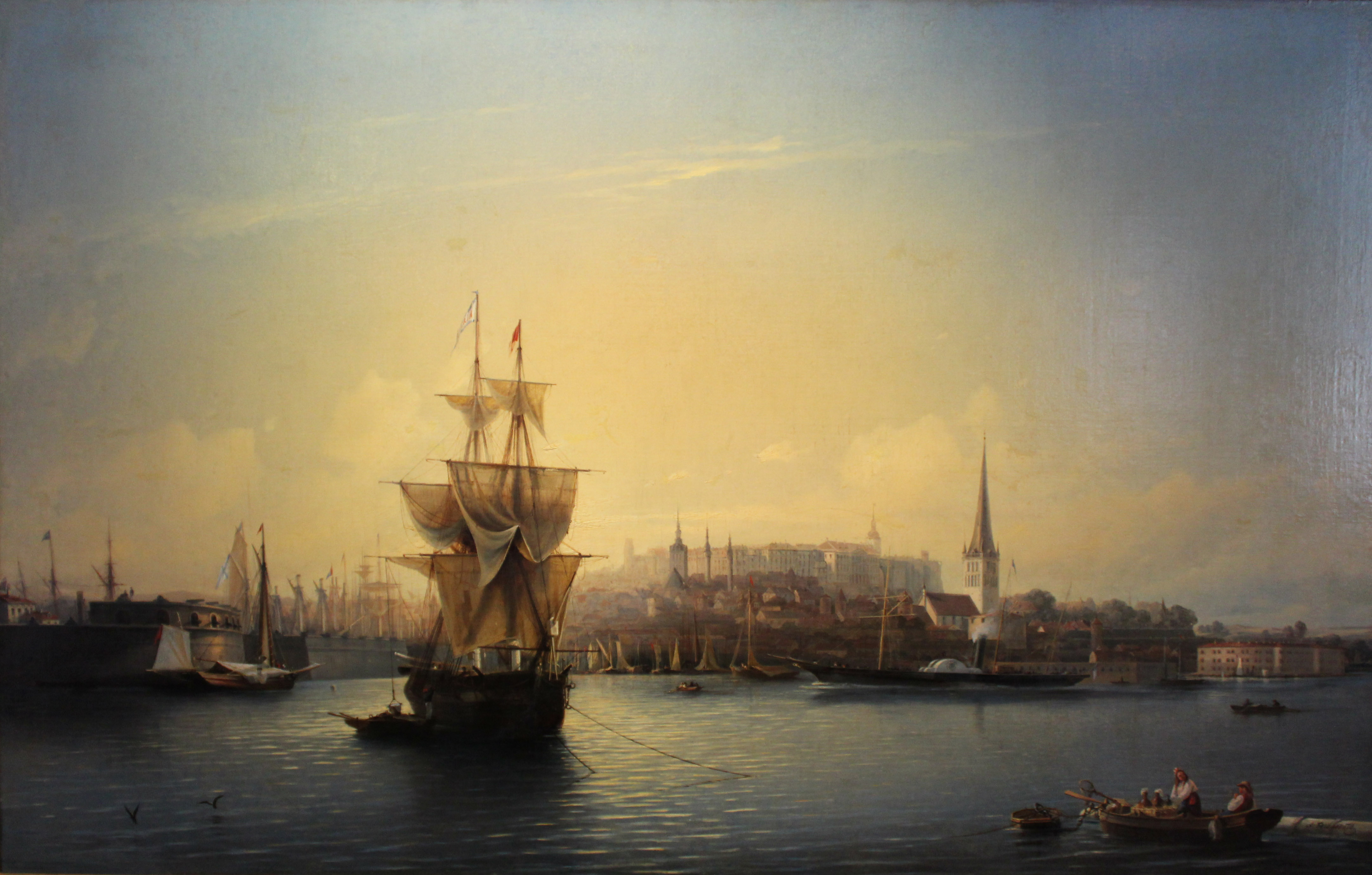
Port of Reval in 1853. Painting by Alexey Bogolyubov.

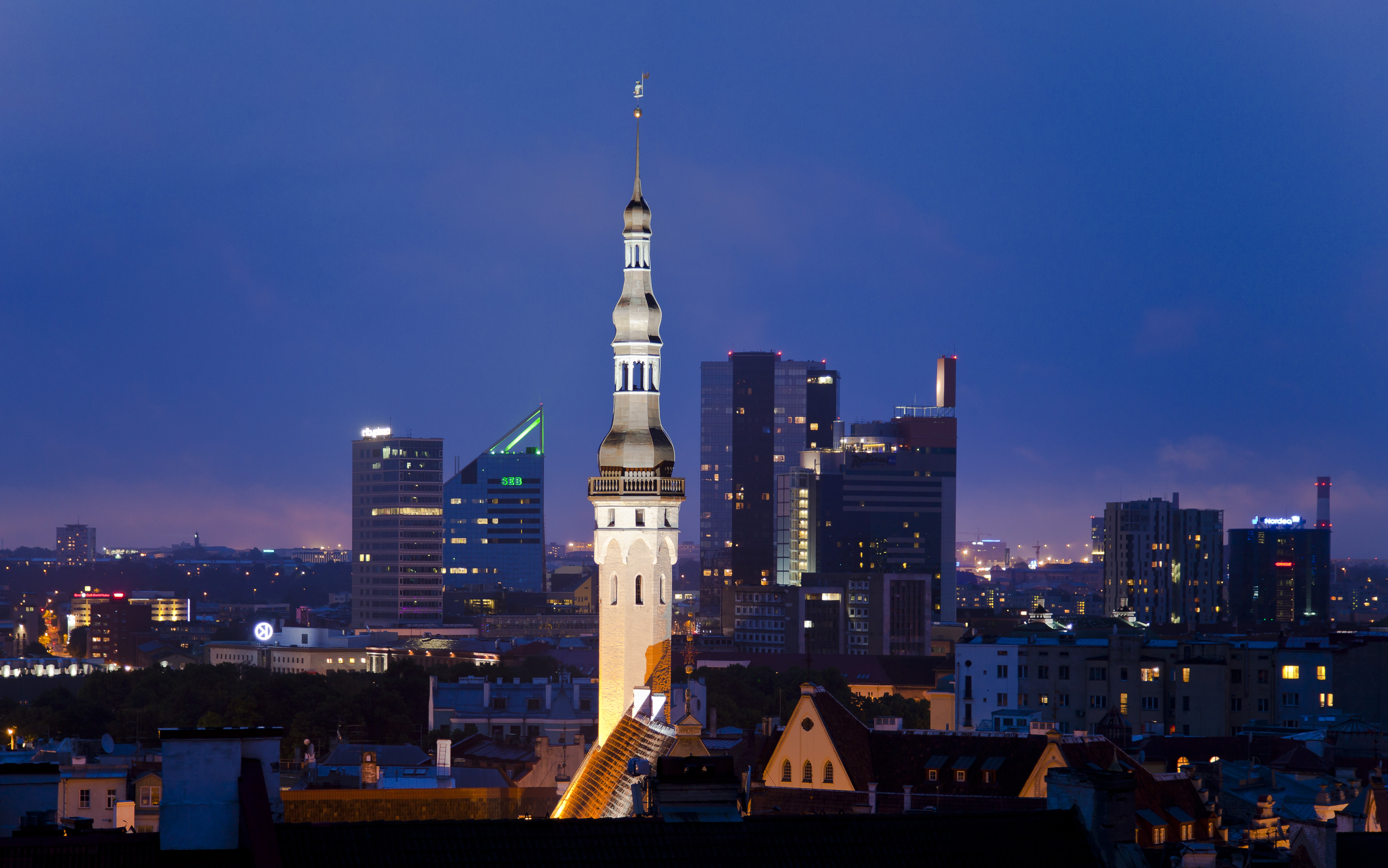
Night view of Tallinn's city center in August 2012

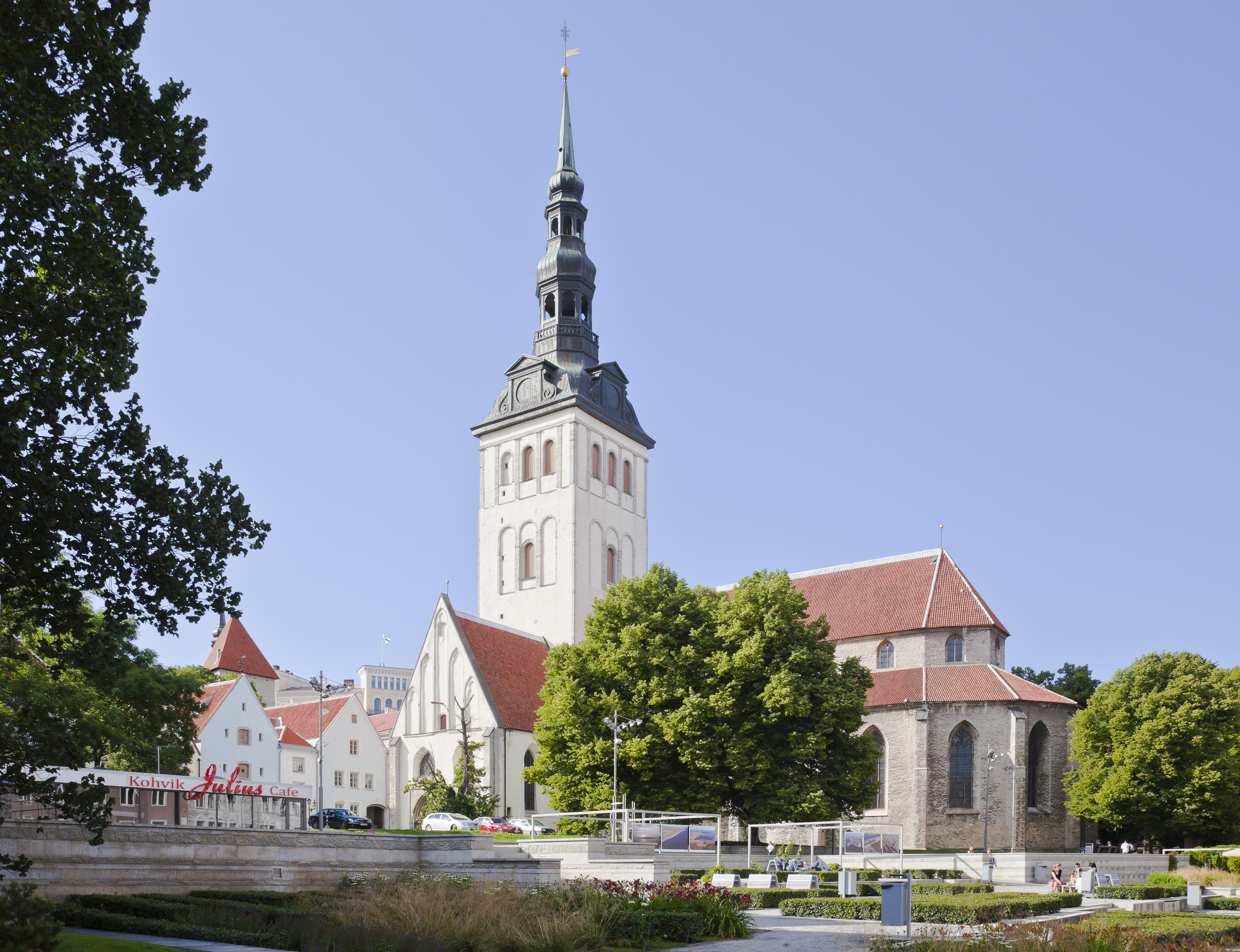
St. Nicholas' Church, built 1230–1275

Alexander Nevsky Cathedral, built 1894–1900

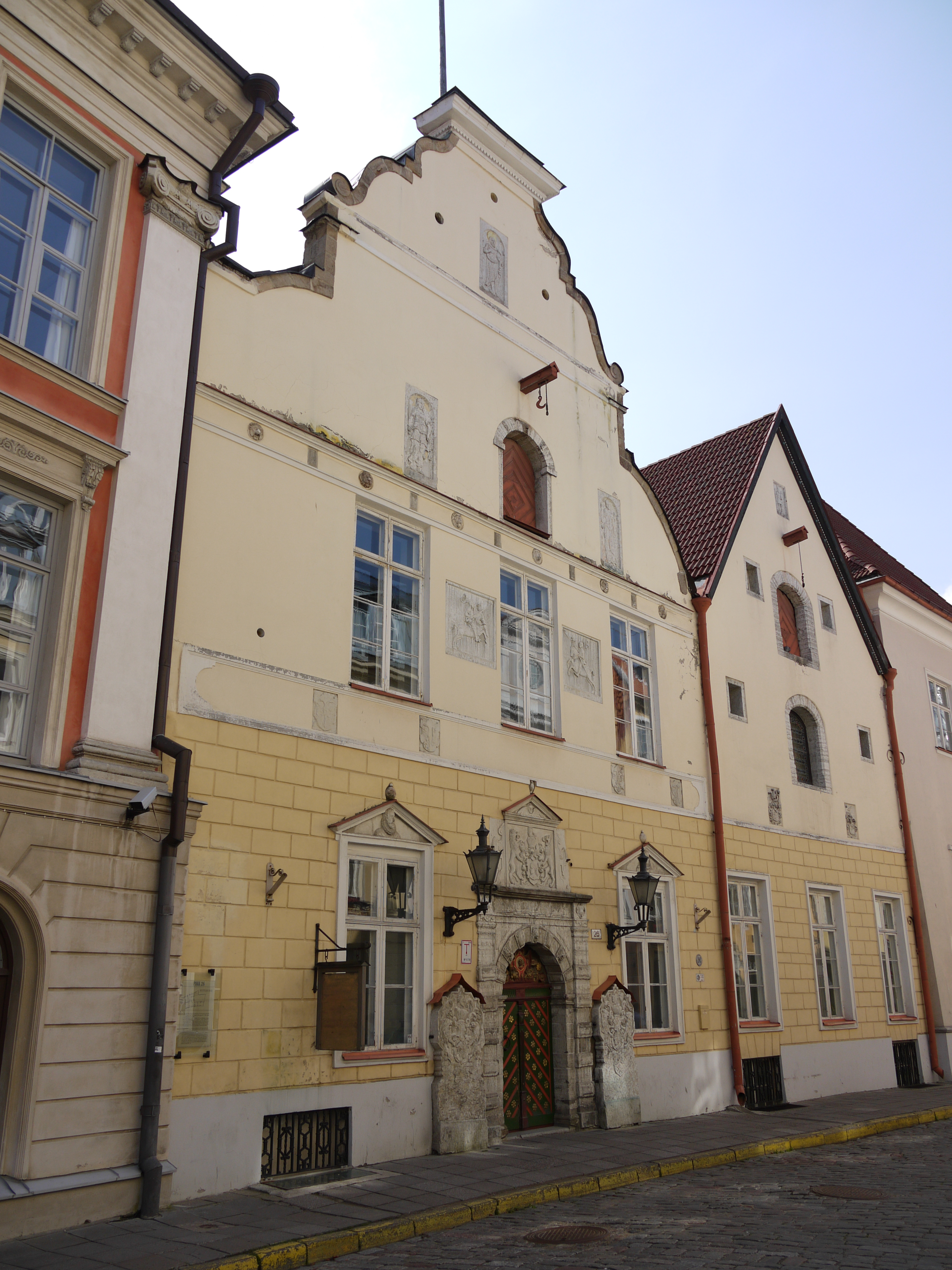
House of the Brotherhood of Blackheads

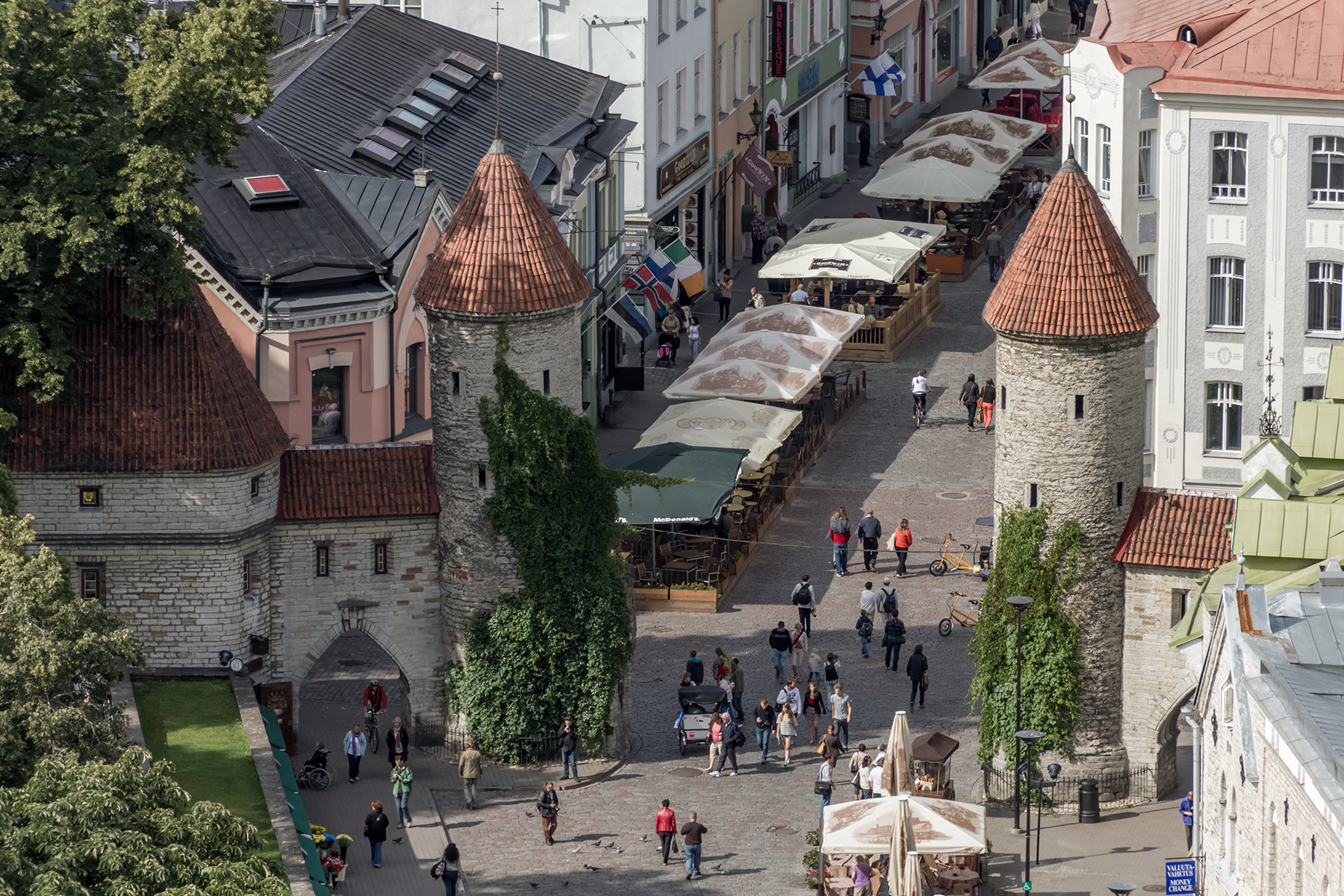
Viru Gate, entrance to the Old Town. Two remaining towers that were part of a larger 14th-century gate system.

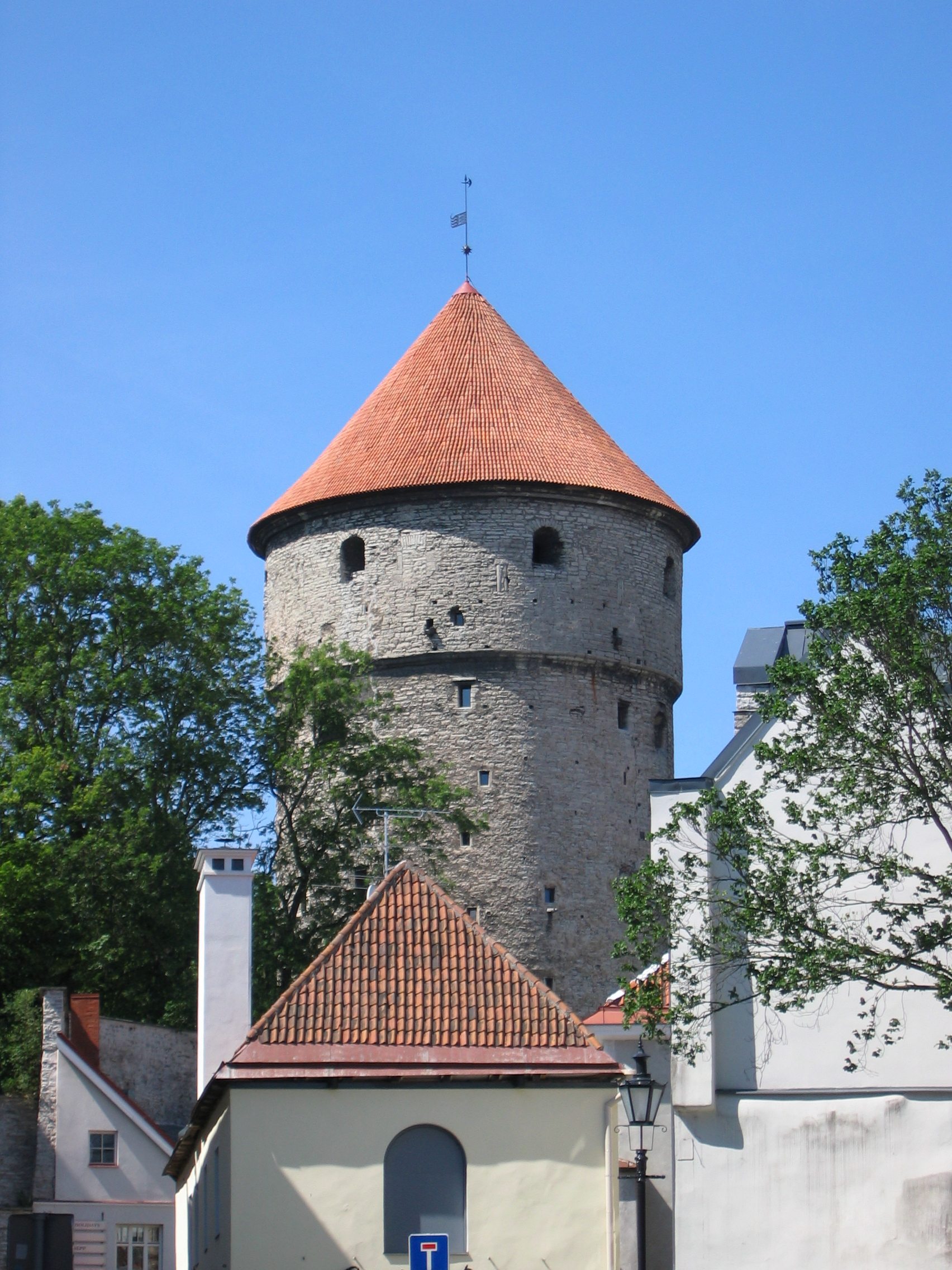
Kiek in de Kök defence tower

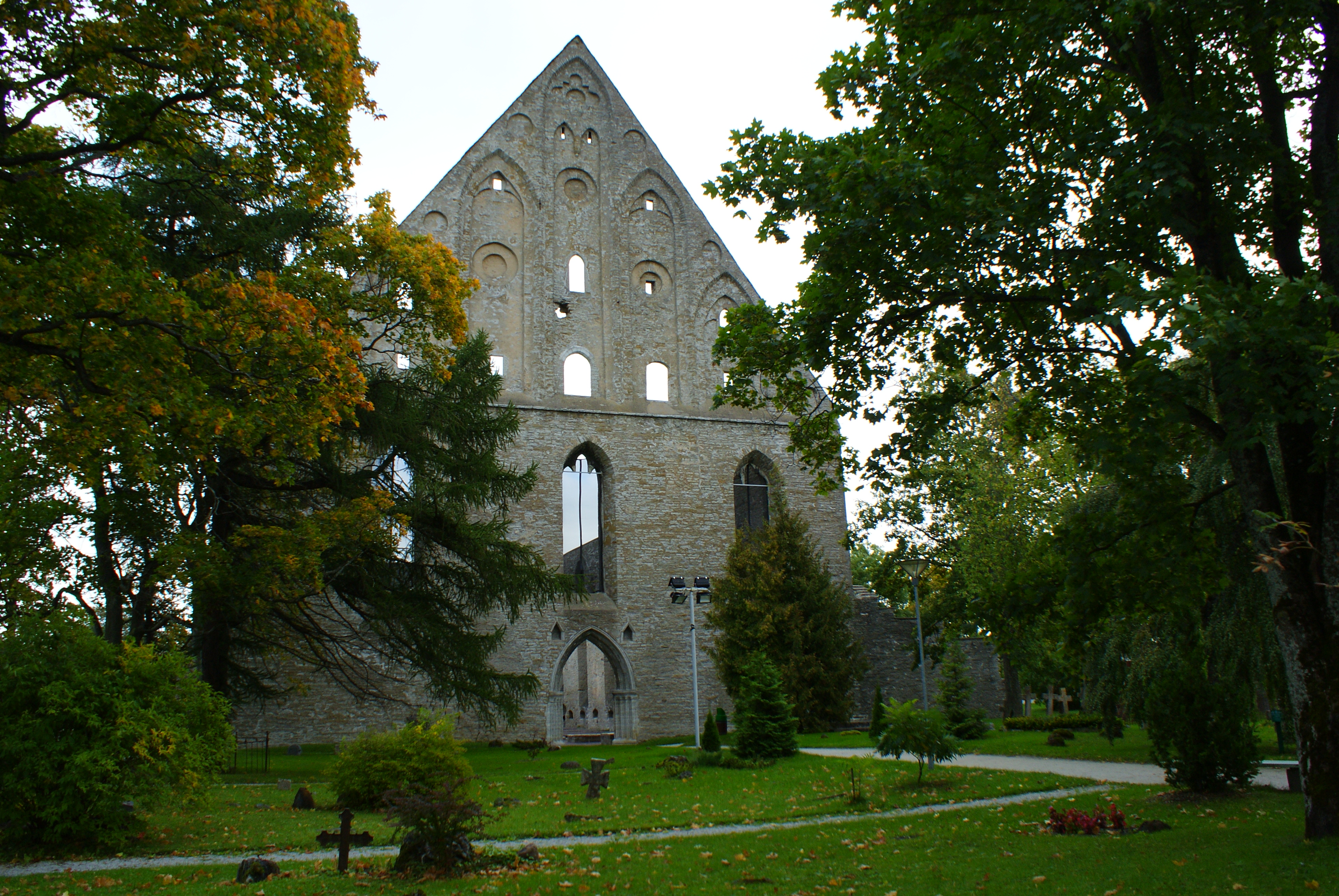
Ruins of the Pirita Convent

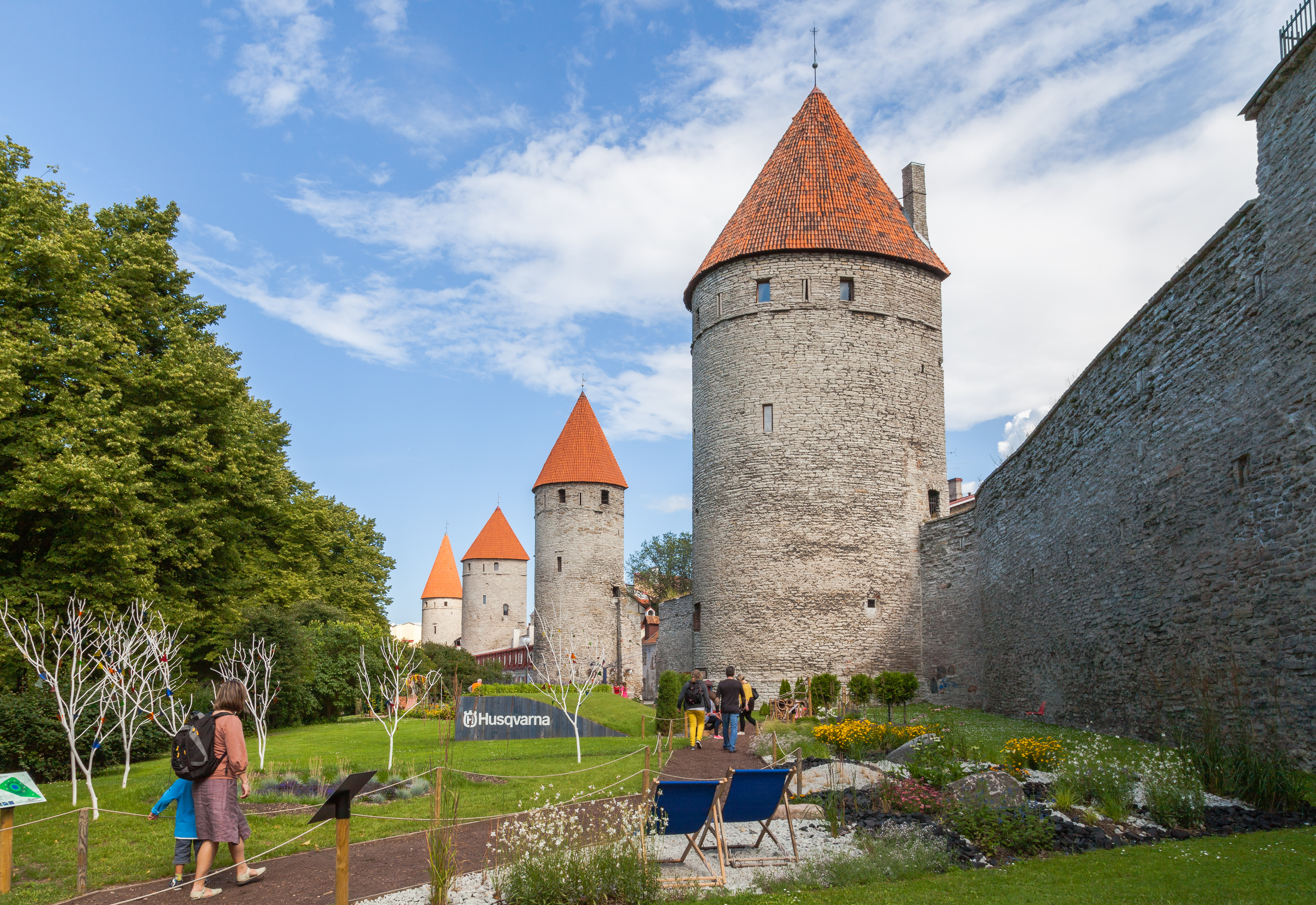
City wall with temporary garden exhibition

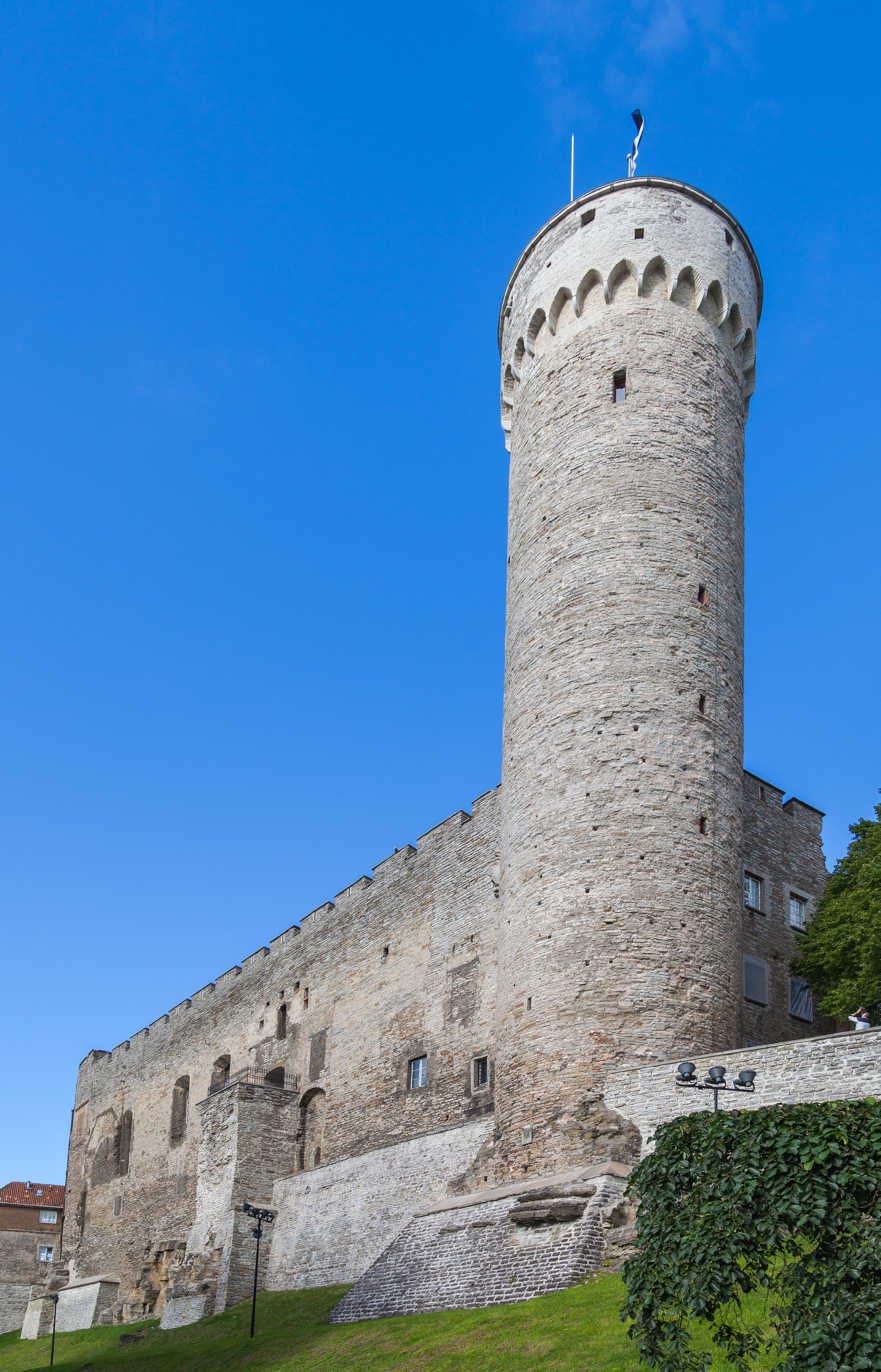
Pikk Hermann (Toompea)

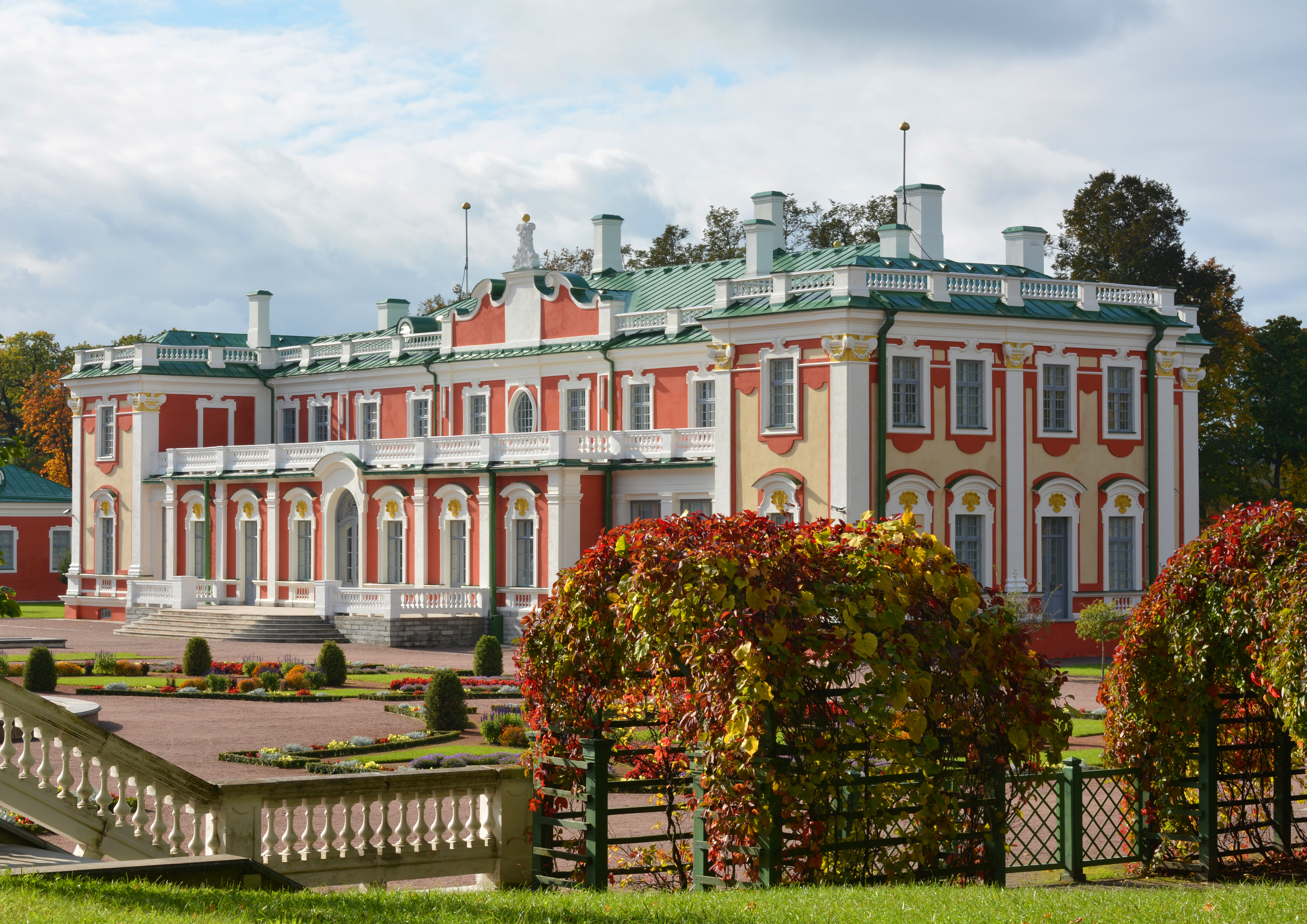
Kadriorg Palace

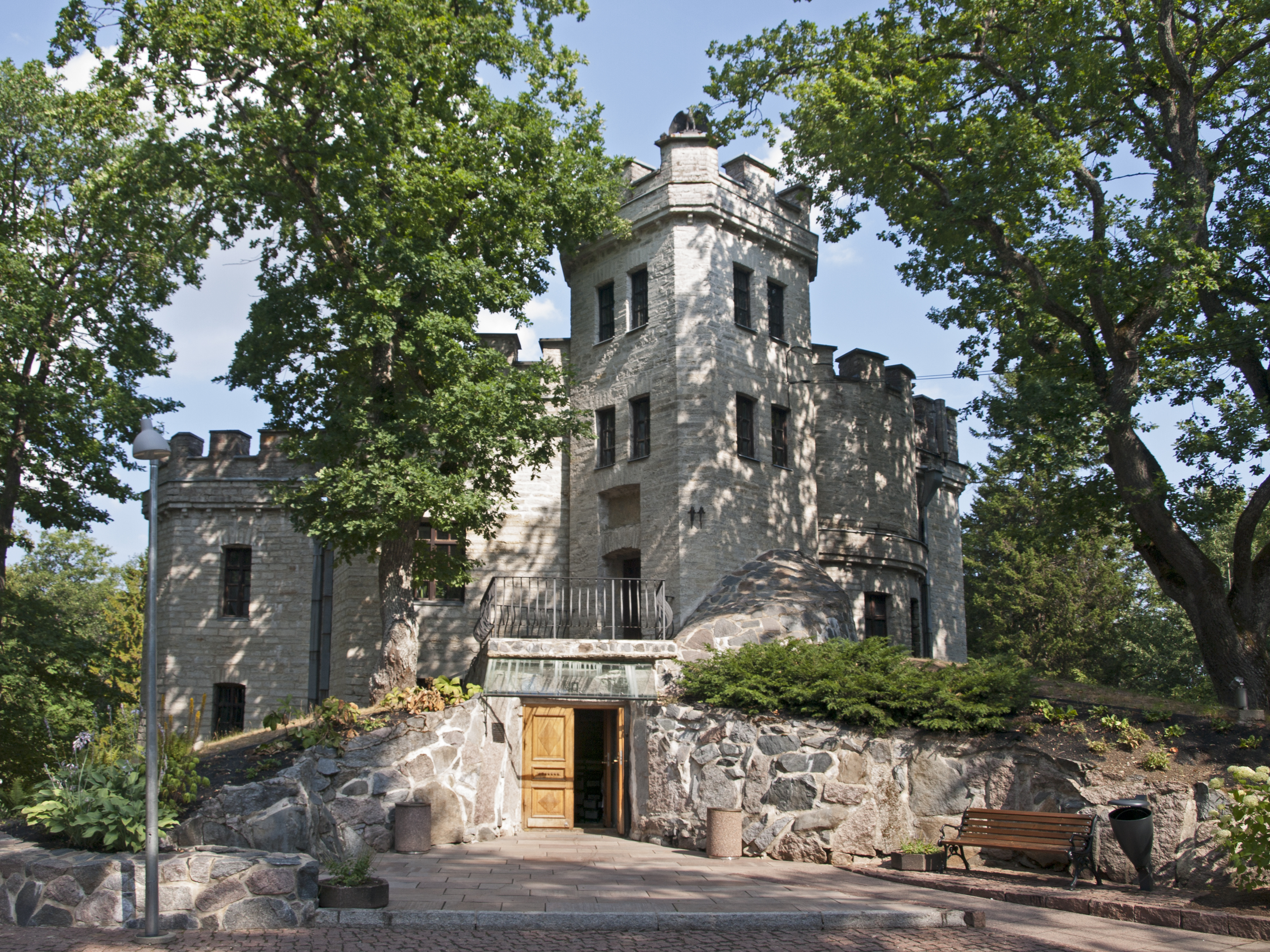
Glehn Castle

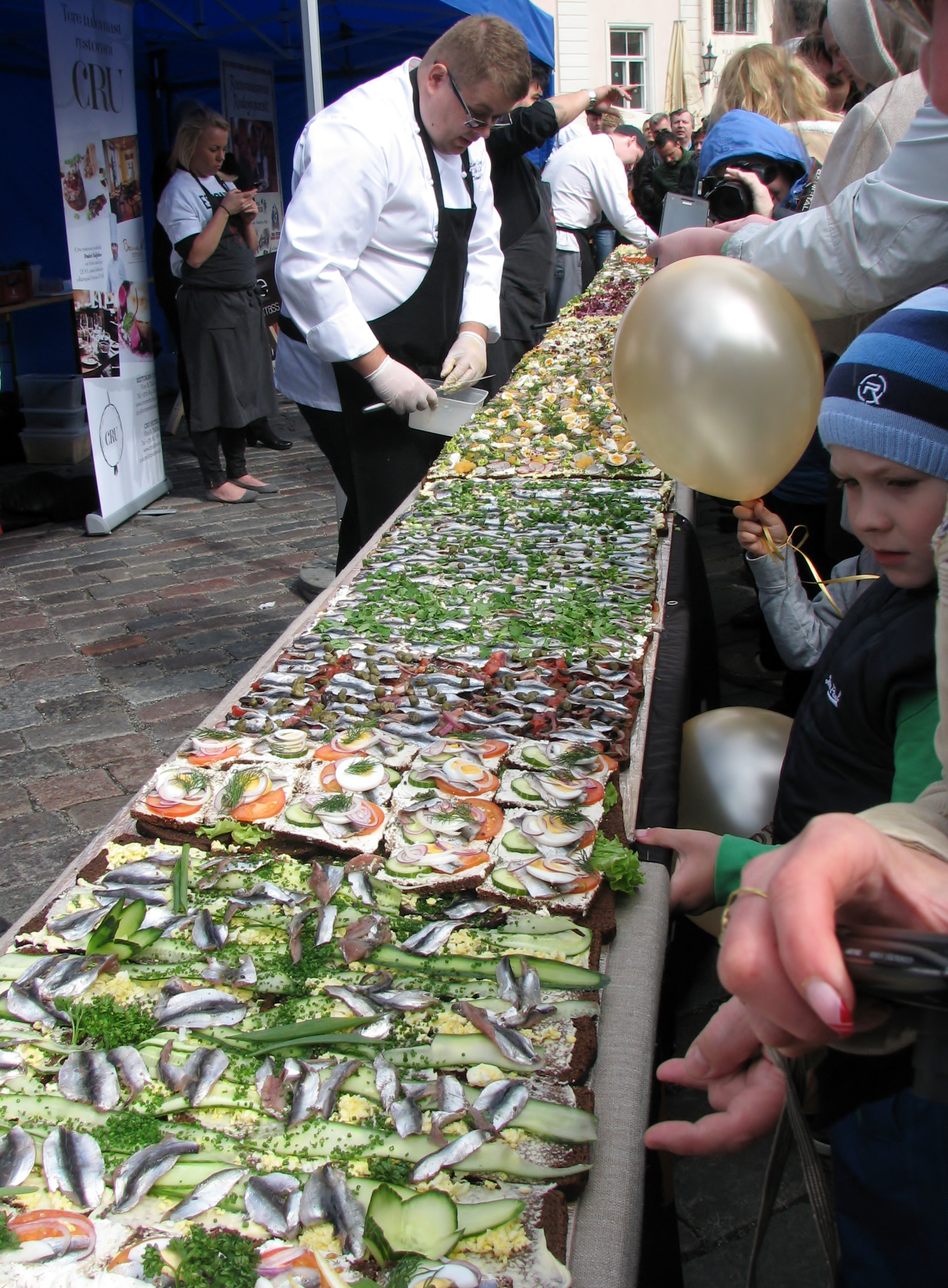
World's largest kiluvõileib, made on Town Hall Square in 2014

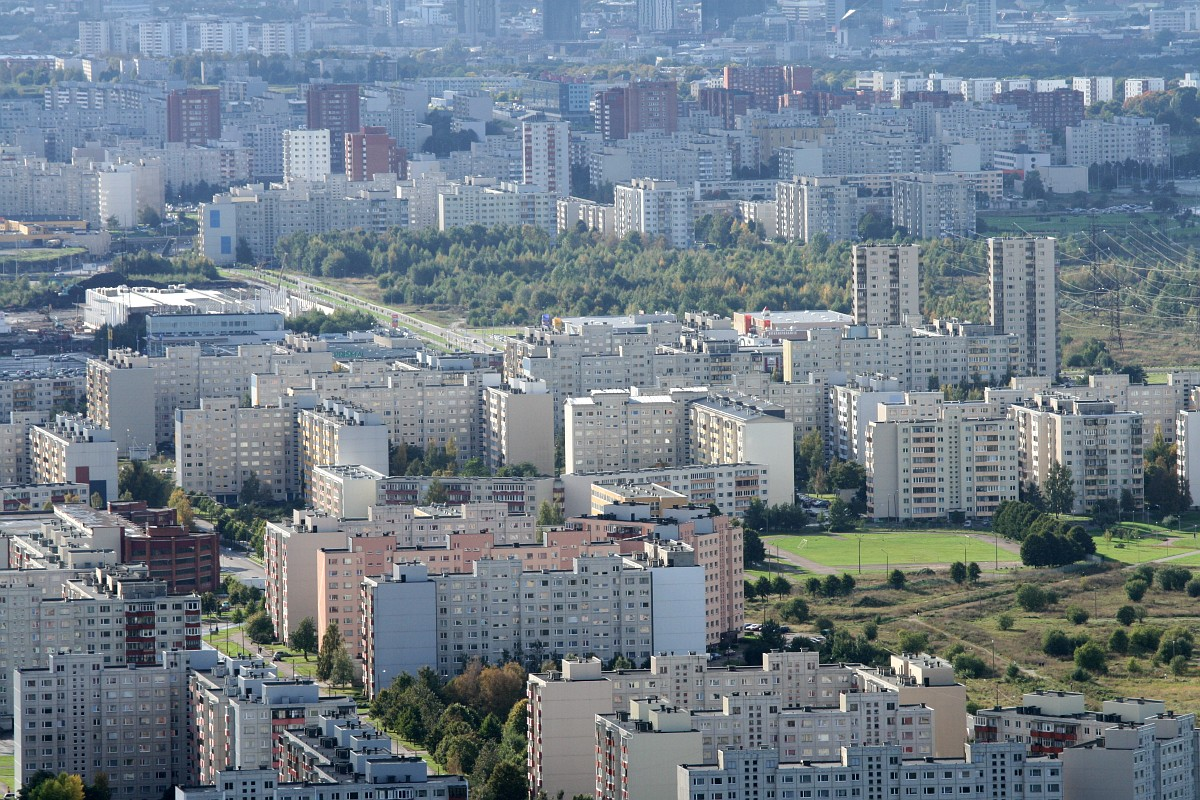
Soviet architecture of the 1980s in the Lasnamäe district

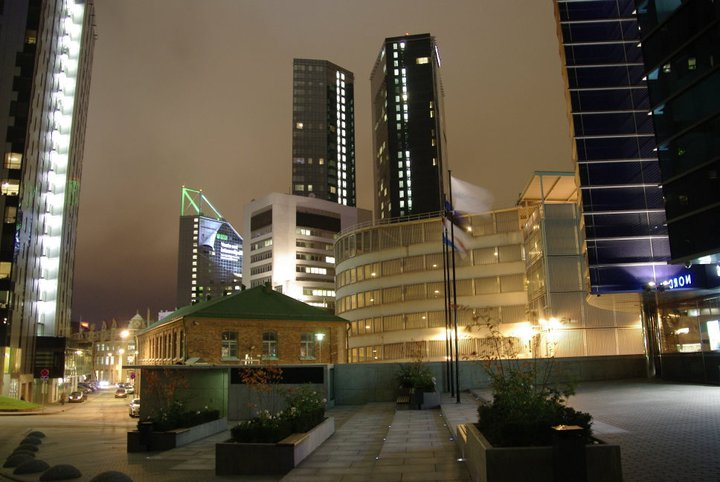
Tornimäe business area

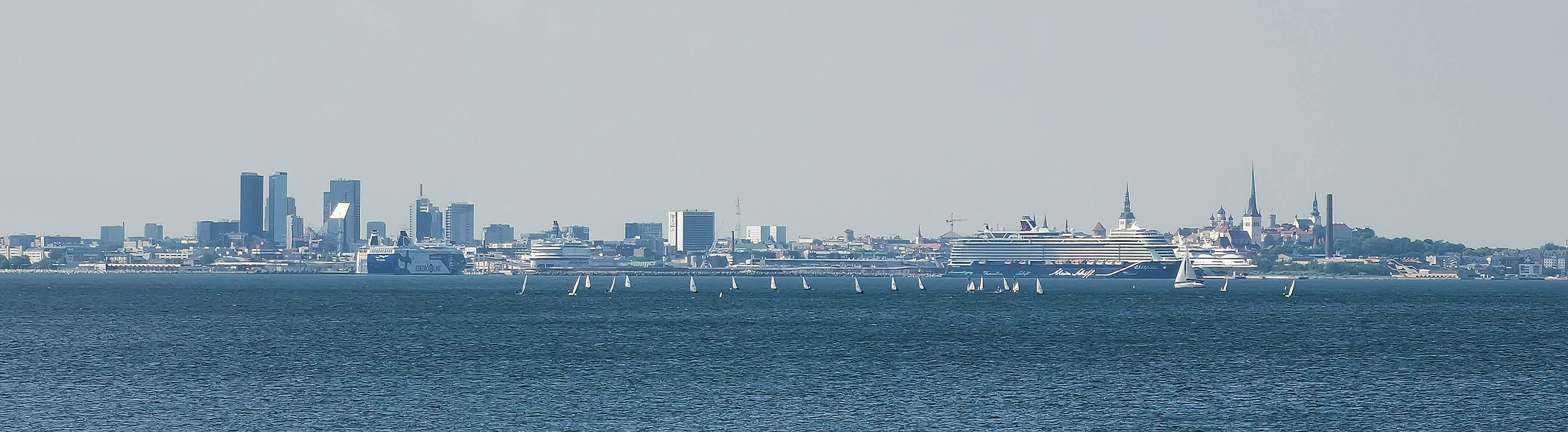
Tallinn Bay and skyline of the city centre (2021)

== See also ==
- Port of Tallinn
- Lennart Meri Tallinn Airport
- Tallinn Bay
- Tallinn Marathon
- Tallinn Town Hall
- Walls of Tallinn

== Bibliography ==
=== Books and article ===
- Burch, Stuart. An unfolding signifier: London's Baltic exchange in Tallinn. Journal of Baltic Studies 39.4 (2008): 451–473.
- Hallas, Karin, ed. 20th Century Architecture in Tallinn (Tallinn, The Museum of Estonian Architecture, 2000).
- Helemäe, Karl. Tallinn, Olympic Regatta city. ASIN B0006E5Y24.
- Kattago, Siobhan. War memorials and the politics of memory: The Soviet war memorial in Tallinn. Constellations 16.1 (2009): 150–166. online
- Naum, Magdalena. Multi-ethnicity and material exchanges in Late Medieval Tallinn. European Journal of Archaeology 17.4 (2014): 656–677. online
- Õunapuu, Piret. The Tallinn department of the Estonian National museum: History and developments. Folklore: Electronic Journal of Folklore 48 (2011): 163–196.
- Pullat, Raimo. Brief history of Tallinn (Estopol, 1999).
- Tannu, Elena (1990). The living past of Tallinn. Perioodika Publishers. ISBN 5-7979-0031-9.

=== Travel guides ===
- Clare Thomson (February 2006). Tallinn. Footprint Publishing. ISBN 1-904777-77-5.
- Neil Taylor (2004). Tallinn. Bradt City Guide. ISBN 1-84162-096-3.
- Dmitri Bruns. Architectural Landmarks, Places of Interest. ASIN B0006E6P9K.
- Sulev Mäeväli. Historical and architectural monuments in Tallinn. ASIN B0007AUR60.
