= Hoppenstedt =

Hoppenstedt may refer to:

== Places in Germany ==
- Hoppenstedt (Osterwieck), a village in Harz district, Saxony-Anhalt
- Hoppenstedt, in Lower Saxony, abandoned when the Bergen-Hohne Training Area was established in the 1930s

== People with the surname ==
- Hendrik Hoppenstedt (born 1972), German politician
- Karsten Friedrich Hoppenstedt (born 1937), German politician

== Other uses ==
- Mr & Mrs Hoppenstedt are fictional characters in the comic works of Loriot, such as Jodeldiplom

== See also ==
- Hoppenstätt
