= House of the Blackheads =

House of the Blackheads may refer to:

- House of the Blackheads (Riga), building in Riga, Latvia
- House of the Blackheads (Tallinn), building in Tallinn, Estonia
