= St. Nicholas Church, Tallinn =

Church in Tallinn, Estonia

St Nicholas' Church, Tallinn
- Niguliste Museum
- Estonian: Niguliste kirik
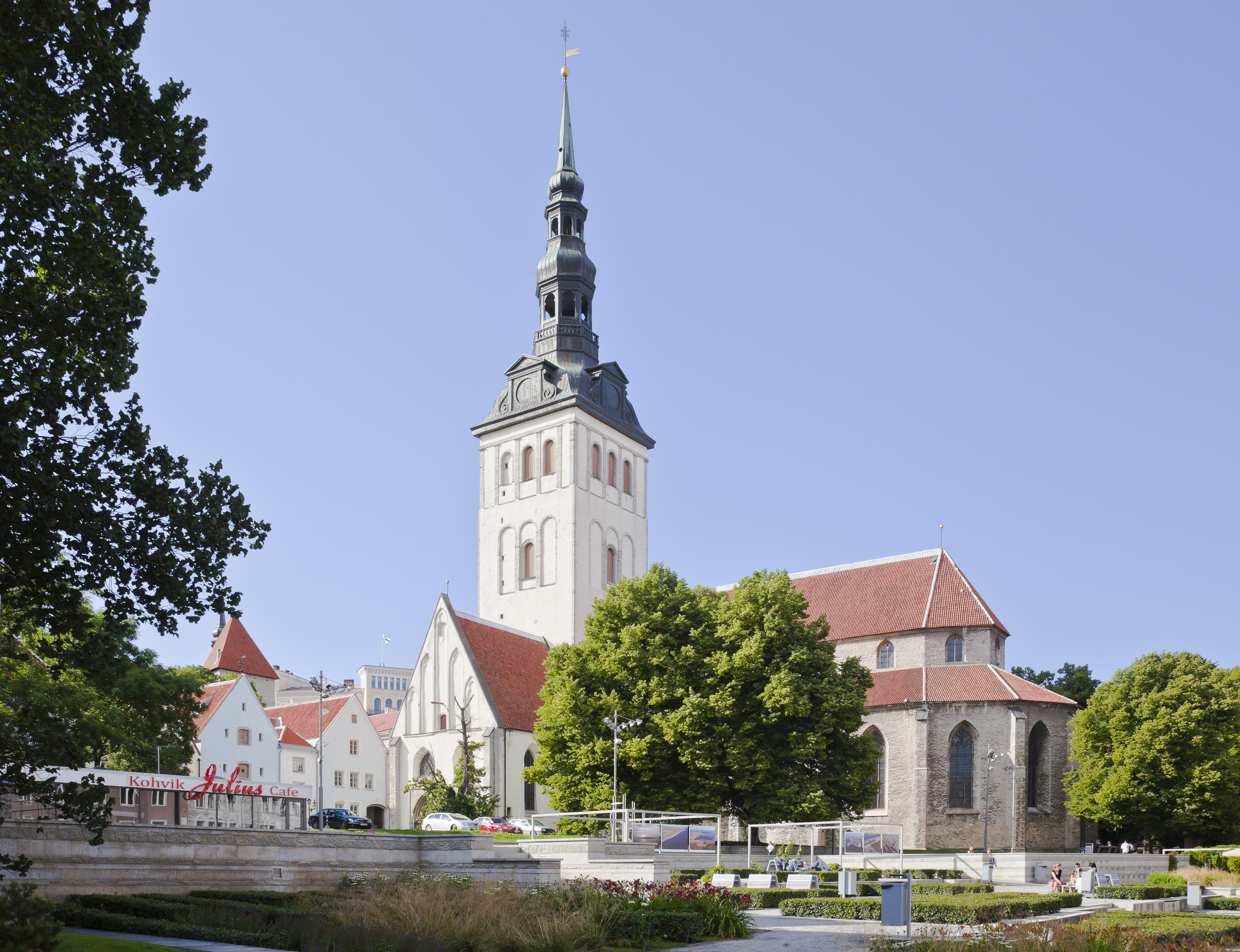
- St Nicholas' Church, Tallinn
- 59°26′10″N 24°44′33″E
- Location: Tallinn
- Country: Estonia
- Language: Estonian
- Denomination: Catholic
- Previous denomination: Catholic (1230-1523), Estonian Evangelical Lutheran Church (1523-1944)
- Website: nigulistemuuseum.ekm.ee/niguliste-kirik/

History
- Status: Museum
- Founded: c. 1230–1275
- Dedication: Saint Nicholas

Architecture
- Functional status: Museum
- Heritage designation: Kultuurimälestis (no.1215)
- Designated: 20 September 1995
- Architectural type: Basilica
- Style: Gothic
- Years built: c. 1230–1275 c. 1405–1420 (renovation); 1515 (tower)
- Closed: 9 March 1944

Specifications
- Materials: Stone

St. Nicholas Church (Estonian: Niguliste kirik, German: Nikolaikirche) is a medieval church building in Tallinn (Reval), Estonia. It was dedicated to Saint Nicholas, the patron of the fishermen and sailors.

Originally built as a Catholic church in the 13th century, it turned Lutheran during the Protestant Reformation in 1520s. It was partially destroyed in the Soviet bombing of Tallinn in World War II. The building itself has since been restored; however, as a church without its own congregation, it has not been used by the Estonian Evangelical Lutheran Church for regular religious services since World War II. At present it houses the Niguliste Museum, a branch of the Art Museum of Estonia, focusing mainly on ecclesiastical art from the Middle Ages onward. It is also used as a concert hall.

== History ==
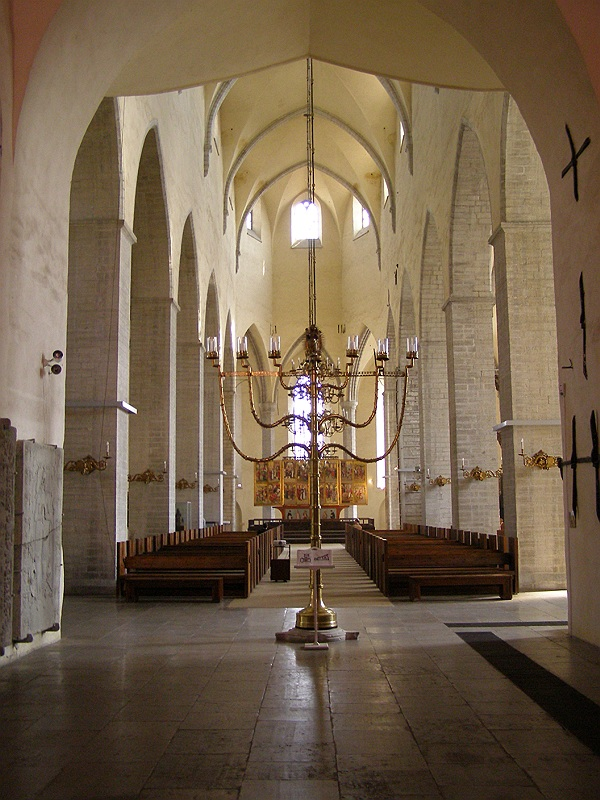
Inside the church, showing the massive seven-armed candelabrum

The church was founded and built around 1230–1275 by Westphalian merchants, who came from Gotland in the 13th century. While the city was still unfortified, the church had heavy bars for closing the entrances, loopholes and hiding places for refugees. When the fortifications around Tallinn were finished in the 14th century (the town wall enclosed the church and the settlement in 1310), St. Nicholas Church lost its defensive function and became a typical medieval parish church. There are only a few parts of the original church that have been preserved through the present.

In 1405–1420, St. Nicholas Church obtained its current appearance, when the central aisle received a clerestory above the side aisles in the form known in architecture as a basilica. In 1515, the tower was built higher and covered with late-Gothic spire. In late 17th century the tower was strengthened and secured. The spire was replaced with a Baroque spire with airy galleries, which was raised higher stage by stage through several centuries. The tower is now 105 metres (344 ft 6 in) high.

Saint Nicholas was the only church in Tallinn which remained untouched by iconoclasm brought by the Protestant Reformation in 1523 (or 1524). The head of the congregation poured molten lead into the locks of the church, and the large unruly mob could not get in. The church was converted to a Lutheran congregation in the 16th century.

On 9 March 1944, the church was severely damaged by Soviet bombing of Tallinn in World War II. The resulting fire turned the church into ruins and destroyed most of its interior (except that of St. Anthony's Chapel), including baroque pews, lofts and pulpit. The tower continued to smoke for about a month. Most precious art treasures survived thanks to their timely evacuation from the church. The renovation of the church started in 1953 and was completely finished in 1981.

The church tower was again damaged by a fire on 12 October 1982. The tower was burnt out and spire destroyed, roofs of the nave and the chapel of St. Anthony damaged.

After a restoration carried out under the guidance of conservator-restorer Villem Raam, the church was inaugurated in 1984 as a museum and concert hall, where the collection of medieval art of the Art Museum of Estonia is displayed. Due to its excellent acoustics, the church is very popular concert hall.

== Artworks in the church ==
Most famous of the artworks in the museum is perhaps a Danse Macabre by the Lübeck master Bernt Notke, which depicts the transience of life, the skeletal figures of Death taking along the mighty as well as the feeble ones. Danse Macabre or The Dance of Death was a popular medieval motif in art. Only the initial fragment of the original 30 metres (98.4 ft) wide painting (accomplished at the end of the 15th century) has been preserved and is currently displayed in St Nicholas Church.

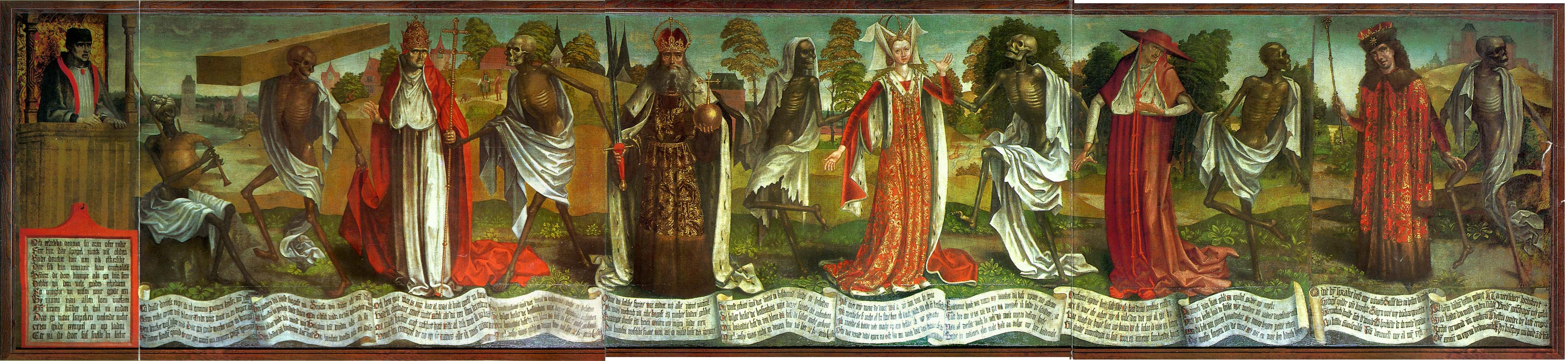
Danse Macabre by Bernt Notke

The museum contains several other notable late Gothic and early Northern Renaissance works of art.

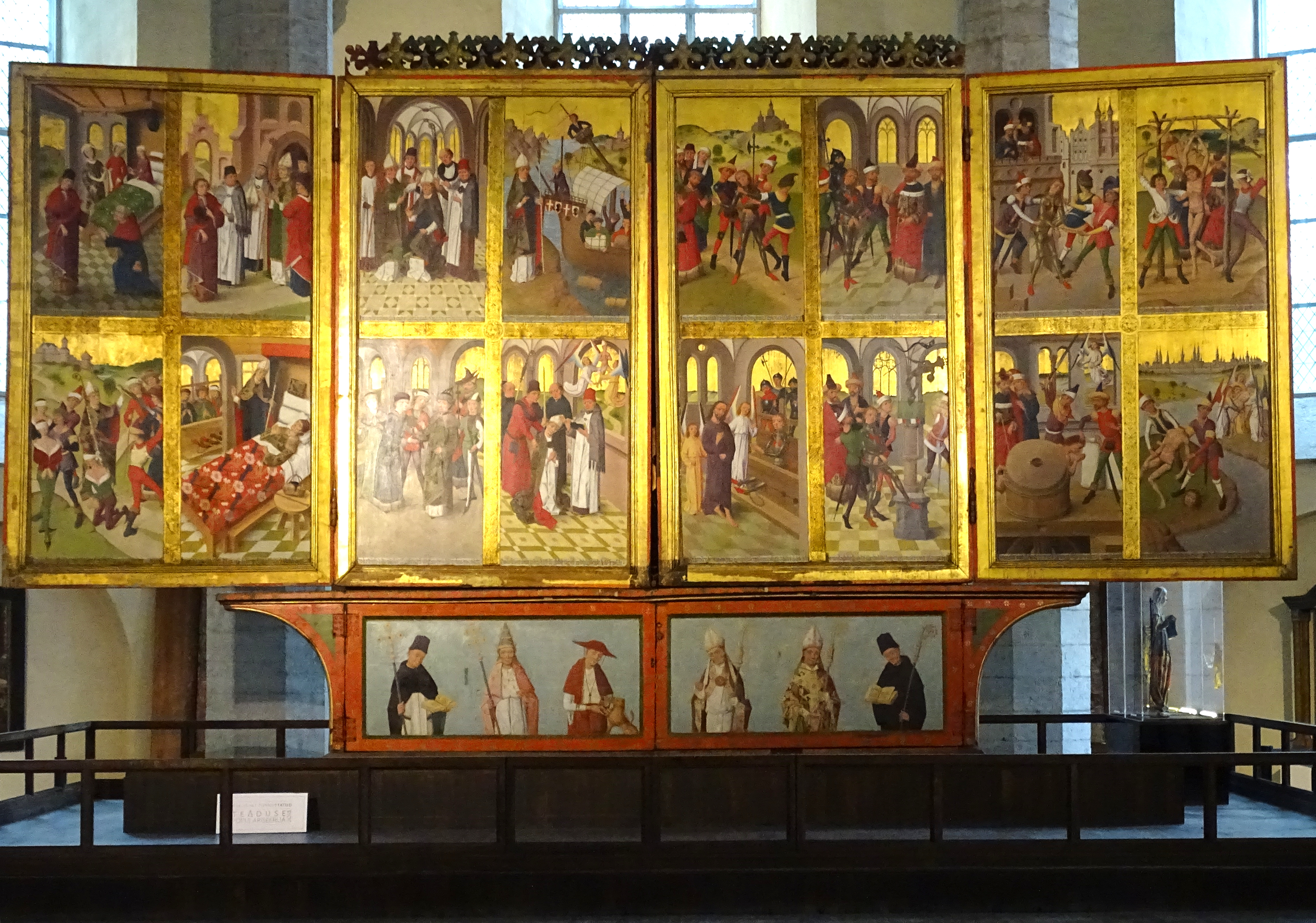
Altarpiece of the High Altar

The former High Altar of St Nicholas Church was made between 1478–1481 in the workshop of Hermen Rode, a master painter from Lübeck. It is one of the largest northern German altarpieces in the 15th-century Hanseatic League. Paintings on the outer flanks of this double-winged altar depict the life of Saint Nicholas and Saint Victor, the central part and the unfolded wings expose over thirty wooden sculptures forming the so-called gallery of saints. The outer wings show the emblems of the Great Guild of Tallinn and the Brotherhood of Blackheads. The predella shows Church Fathers and the founders of orders: St Bernard of Clairvaux, St. Gregory the Great, St. Jerome, St. Augustine, St. Ambrose and St Benedict of Nursia.

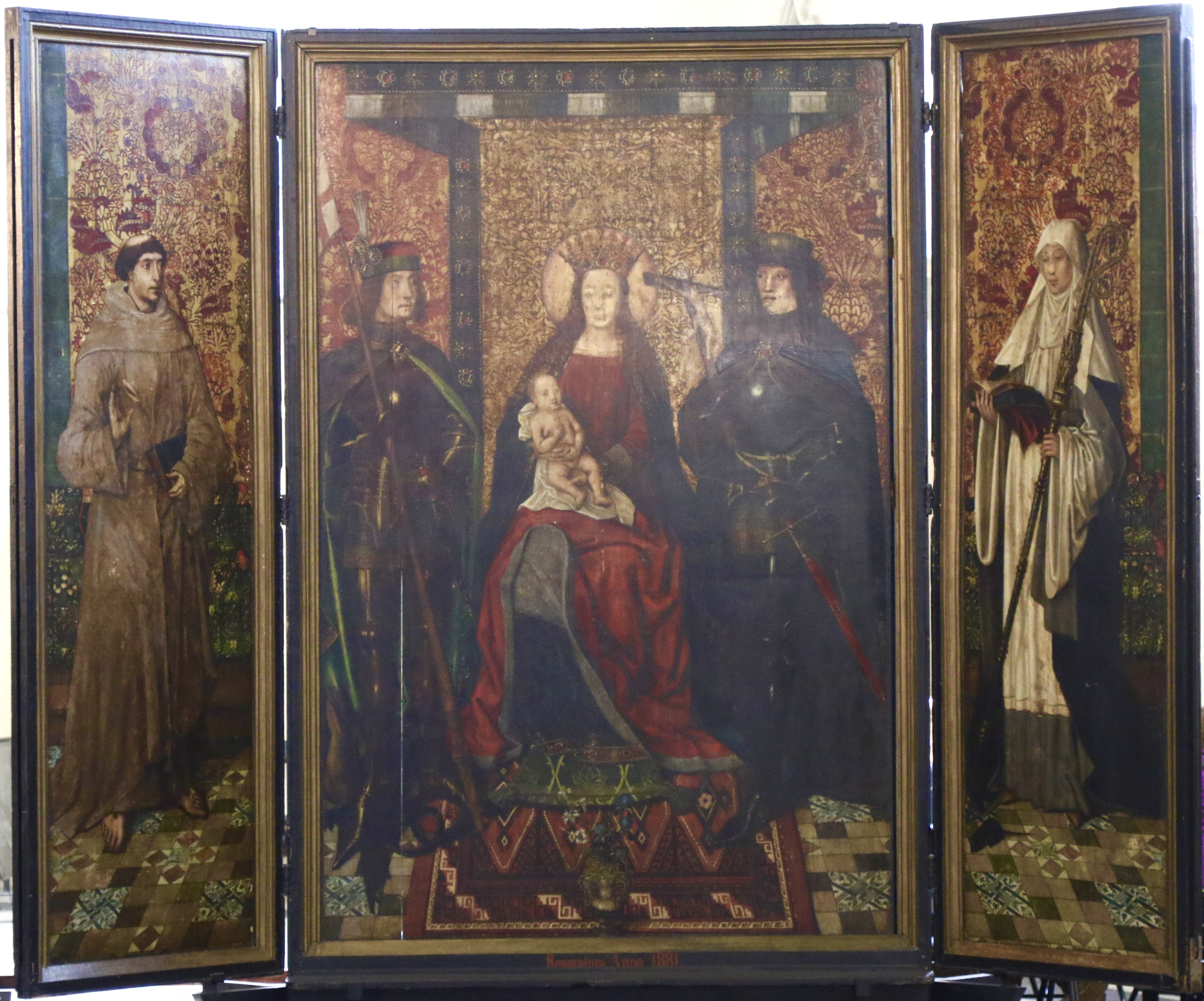
Altarpiece of the Virgin Mary of the Brotherhood of the Blackheads

Several other altarpieces from the same period can be mentioned: the altarpiece of "St. Mary and the Brotherhood of Blackheads" from 1500, made in Bruges by the anonymous Master of the Legend of Saint Lucy. The other wings depict the Annunciation in grisaille technique in a scene with the archangel Gabriel and the Virgin Mary with an open book. The open wings show from left to right: Virgin Mary with a bared breast and donors, Christ pointing at the wound on His chest, God the Father enthroned, John the Baptist with donors. In the open view we see the Virgin Mary flanked by St George and St. Victor. The left wing shows St. Francis of Assisi and the right wing St. Gertrude of Nivelles. The retable remained in the house of the Brotherhood of the Blackheads from 1534 to 1943.

The altar of the Holy Kin from about 1490, made at Jan Borman’s workshop in Brussels; or the altar of Christ's Passion, made at the beginning of the 16th century by the workshop of the Bruges master Adrian Isenbrandt at the order of the powerful Brotherhood of Blackheads. A single panel painting by the Master of Schloss Lichtenstein, "Presentation of Christ in the Temple" (1430–1440) and several medieval woodcarvings by Henning von der Heide (depicting St. Nicholas, Virgin Mary and John the Evangelist) (1510–1520) are also on display.

There is a four-metre high, seven-branched, brass candelabrum from 1519, one of the largest in Europe. On top of the middle branch stands a double-sided figure of the Virgin Mary with Child on a throne. It was a donation in 1519 by the wealthy Tallinn merchant Hans Bouwer.

Of later works of art, the figure of St. Christopher by Tobias Heinze, (1624) a 350-year-old decorative screen of Bogislaus Rosen's chapel carved by Frans Hoppenstätt, and the epitaph of Antonius von der Busch by Arent Passer (1608) can be mentioned. Around the nave lie a series of 17th century tomb-top effigies like Berndt Reinhold von Delwig and Hermann Nieroth in full body armour.

The museum also contains a special silver chamber with the silver treasures of guilds, craft corporations and the Brotherhood of Blackheads.

== Charles Eugène de Croÿ ==
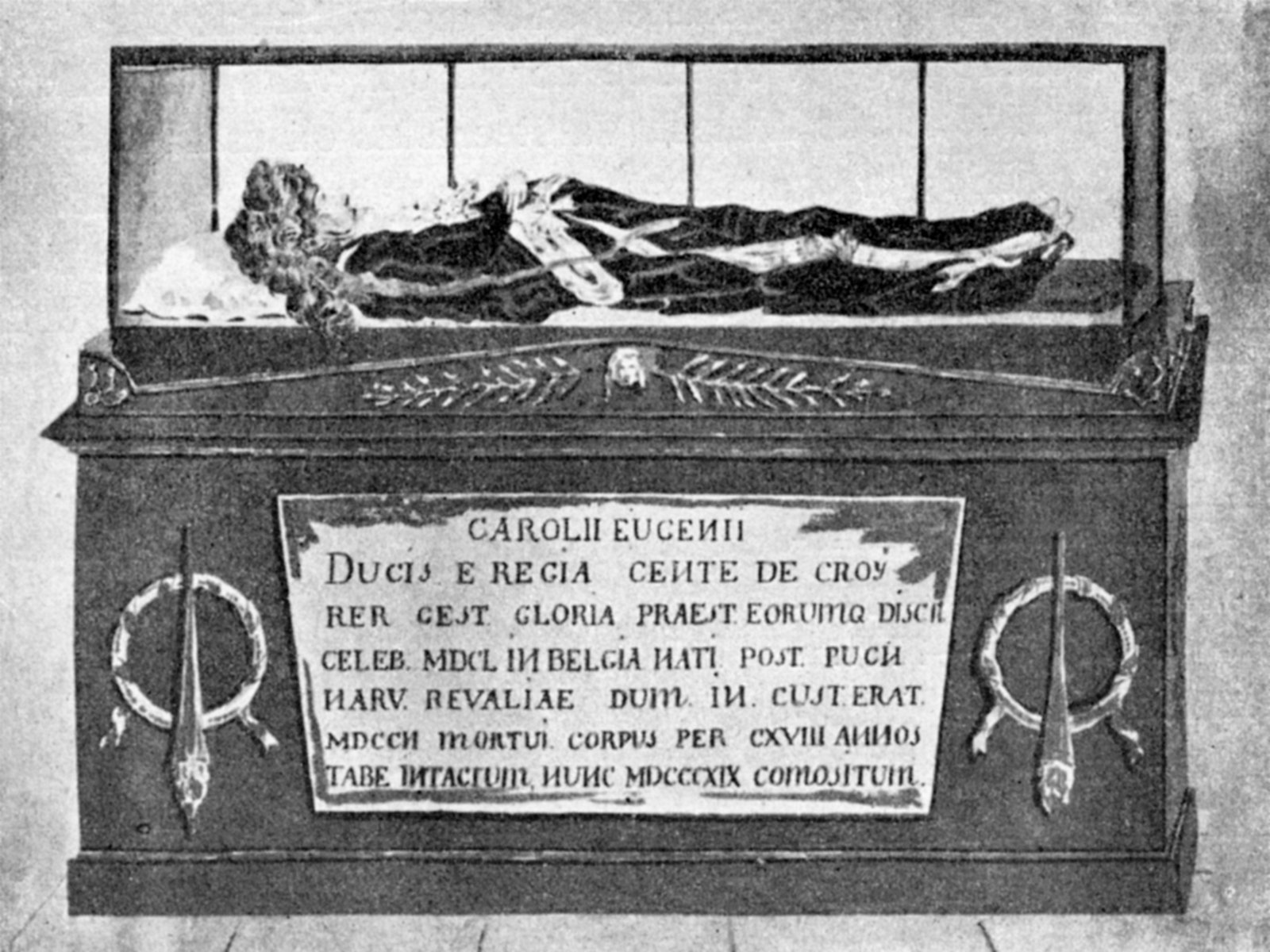
19th-century drawing of Charles Eugène de Croÿ's mummy

The side chapel was used to hold the mummy of Duke Charles Eugène de Croÿ, the commander of the Russian army at Battle of Narva (1700), taken prisoner by Swedish King Charles XII. Charles Eugène de Croÿ died in 1702 and was left unburied, as nobody was willing to pay for the funeral. The air conditions in the chapel where the body was held protected the corpse from decaying and it became an attraction, remaining on display until 1897, when the authorities finally buried it.

== See also ==
- Culture of Estonia
- St. Olaf's Church, Tallinn
