= Danse Macabre (Notke) =

15th century painting by Bernt Notke

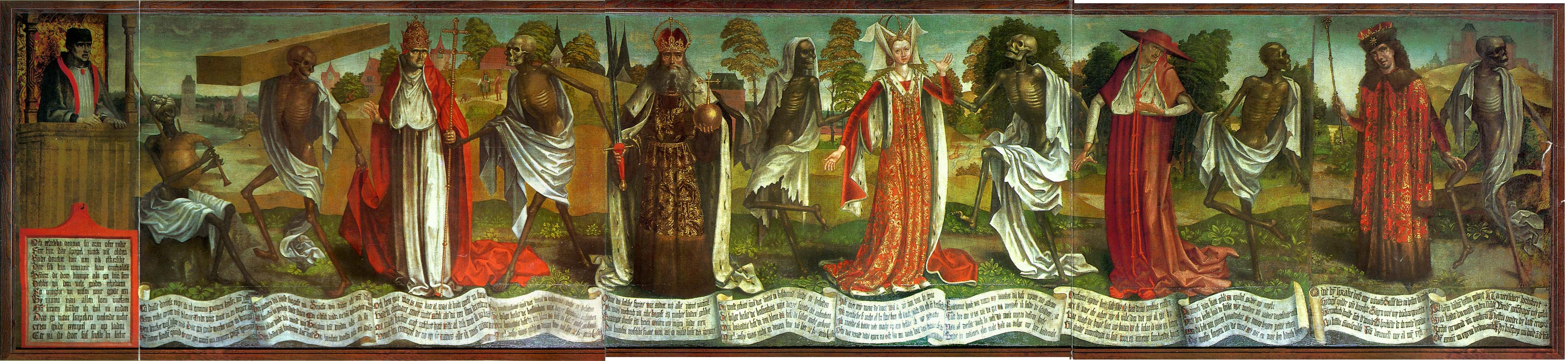
- Artist: Bernt Notke
- Year: Late 15th century
- Medium: oil on canvas
- Dimensions: 157 cm × 750 cm (62 in × 300 in)
- Location: St Nicholas' Church, Tallinn

Danse Macabre is a painting by Bernt Notke. A fragment of the late fifteenth-century painting, originally some 30 meters (98.4 ft) wide, is displayed in the St. Nicholas Church, Tallinn. It is regarded as the best-known and as one of the most valuable medieval artworks in Estonia. It is the only surviving medieval Dance Macabre in the world painted on canvas.

The Dance of Death theme is frequent in the art and literature of the late Middle Ages, where it functions as a memento mori, the admonition that all must die. In the face of Death all are equal. The skeletal figure of Death dances with mortals, hierarchically arranged to begin with popes and emperors and ending with peasants, fools, or infants. The figures are accompanied by a winging band in the Low German language, a dialogue in verse between Death and the other characters.

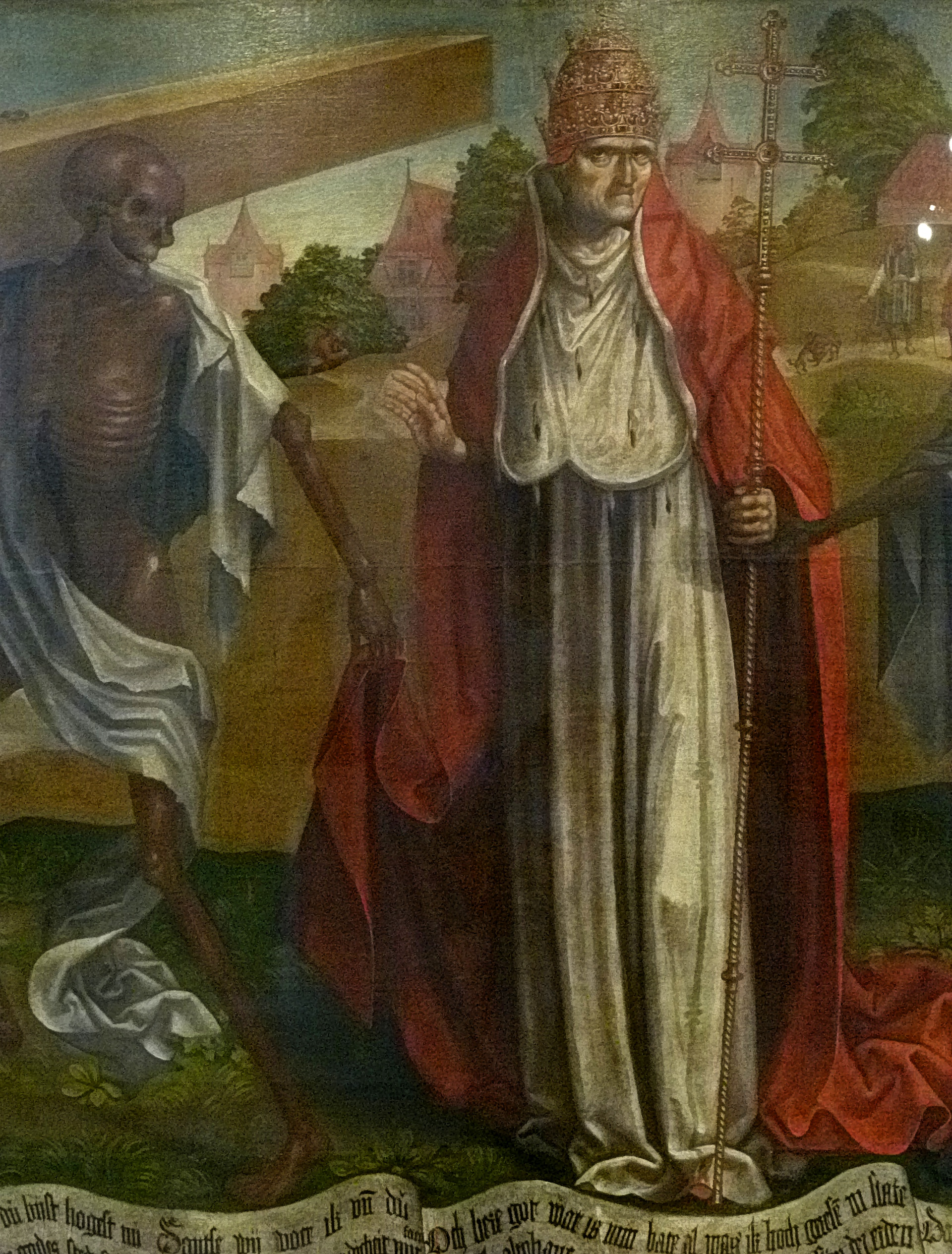
Dance Macabre, Death and the Pope

Created at the end of the 15th century, Bernt Notke's Tallinn fragment reproduces the artist's work with 49 figures (finished by his workshop in 1463) in St. Mary's Church in Lübeck. The Lübeck work was at the beginning of the 18th century in such a bad condition that a copy was made by the painter Anton Wortmann in 1701. This copy perished in 1942. According to most accounts, the painting was installed at the St. Nicholas church sometime around 1493-95.

The Tallinn version as preserved begins with the thirteenth figure; it is not certain how many figures the work originally depicted. Not recorded in the accounting records of St. Nicholas up to 1520 (with a first written reference from 1603), Notke's painting was most likely commissioned and paid for by private donors, a guild, or a brotherhood. It differs from the Lübeck original by its background and the content of its verses.

St. Nicholas Church in Tallinn was badly damaged in a Soviet air raid on the city on the evening of March 9, 1944; most of the valuable interior was destroyed. Fortunately the Danse Macabre as well as other priceless artworks (notably the Hermen Rode altar from 1478) were in storage elsewhere as the air raids had been anticipated.

The surviving fragment was restored in Moscow between 1962 and 1964 by P. Baranov, S. Globacheva, S. Titov, and G. Karlsen under the direction of V. Karaseva.
