= Hermen Rode =

15th century German artist

Hermen Rode (fl. c. 1468 – c. 1504) was a German Gothic painter.

== Life and works ==
Very little is known about Rode. He lived and worked in Lübeck, and from 1468 owned a house on Johannisstrasse street in the city, implying a certain degree of wealth and fame. A number of altarpieces have been attributed to him, although only one bears his signature: the altarpiece of St. Luke, executed 1484 for St. Catherine's church in Lübeck and today in St. Anne's Museum, Lübeck.

Several of the altarpieces attributed to Rode are today found in different parts of Sweden and seem to have been made specifically for a Swedish market, as they include depictions of national Swedish saints. Some of these paintings are now in the Swedish Museum of National Antiquities, while others are in churches around the country, such as an altar dedicated to St. Mary in Sorunda church and an altarpiece dedicated to St. Gertrude and St. Dorothy in Falsterbo church.

One of Rode's most imposing works of art is his mature High Altar of St. Nicholas' Church, Tallinn. It is currently on display at the Niguliste Museum, branch of the Art Museum of Estonia. This painting includes the first known view of the skyline of Lübeck with its then eight church towers as background.

Of his art, The Grove Encyclopedia of Northern Renaissance Art notes that it displays:

[...] characteristic features such as his distinctive type of female head, with a prominent forehead, receding, softly rounded chin and strangely overcast, half-closed eyes. The bodies, however, are oddly boneless and retain the pointed, forward-stepping Late Gothic stance, and the colours are still dull and thinly painted. Later, influences from the Netherlands, especially from Bruges (Gerard David), became stronger, particularly in the palette, with bright, clear colour combinations resembling those of the Westphalian Master of Liesborn.

— Gordon Campbell (ed.), The Grove Encyclopedia of Northern Renaissance Art, Oxford University Press (2009)

He stands equally next to his fellow countryman Bernt Notke. Together they were important exporters of art into the countries around the Baltic Sea.

== Gallery ==
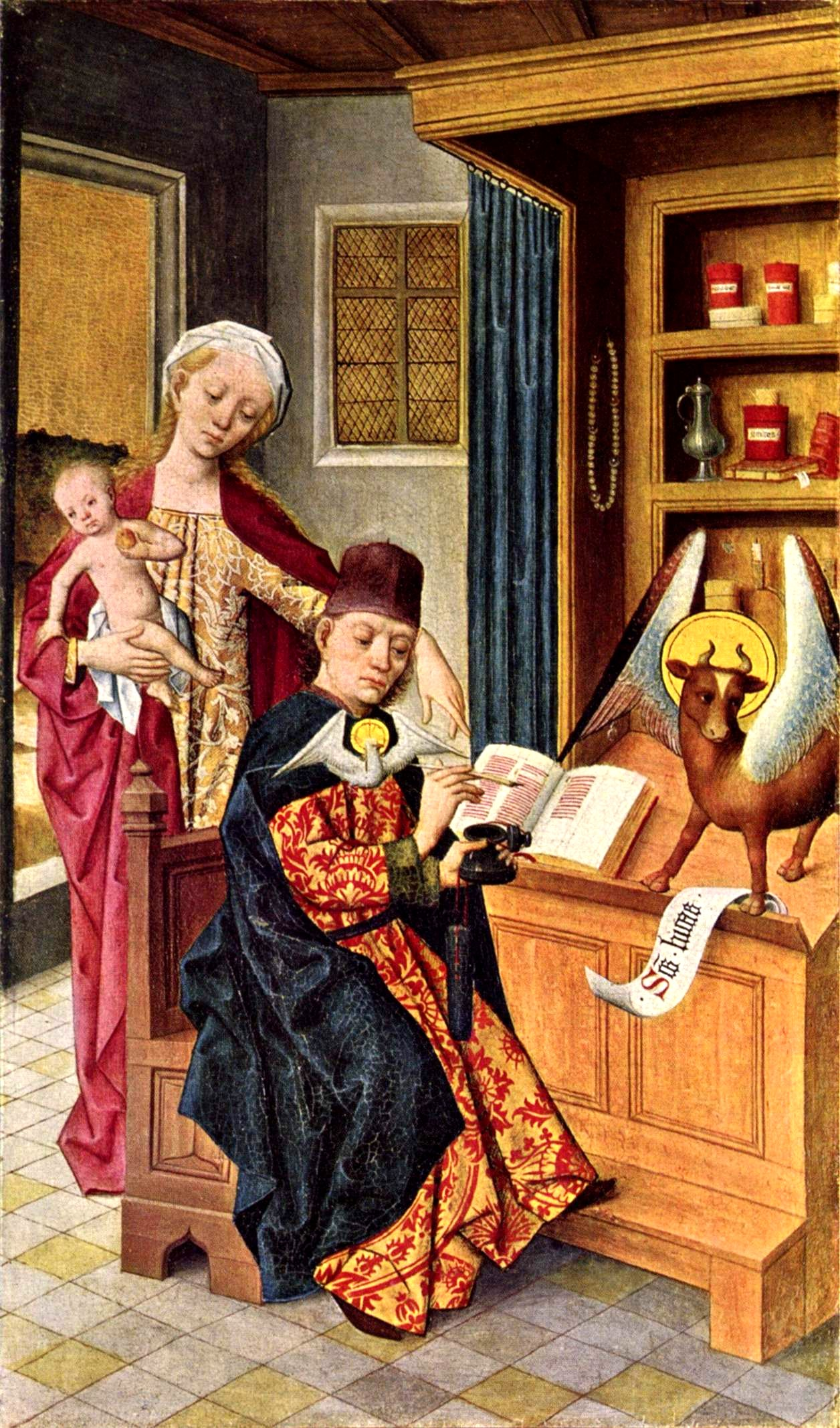
St. Luke's Altar (Lübeck), ca. 1484

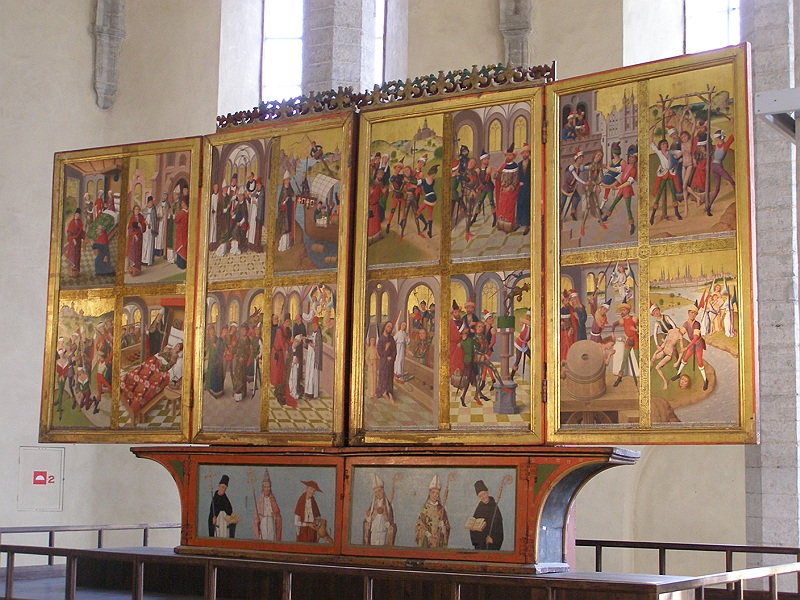
High Altar of St. Nicholas church (Tallinn), ca. 1478-1481

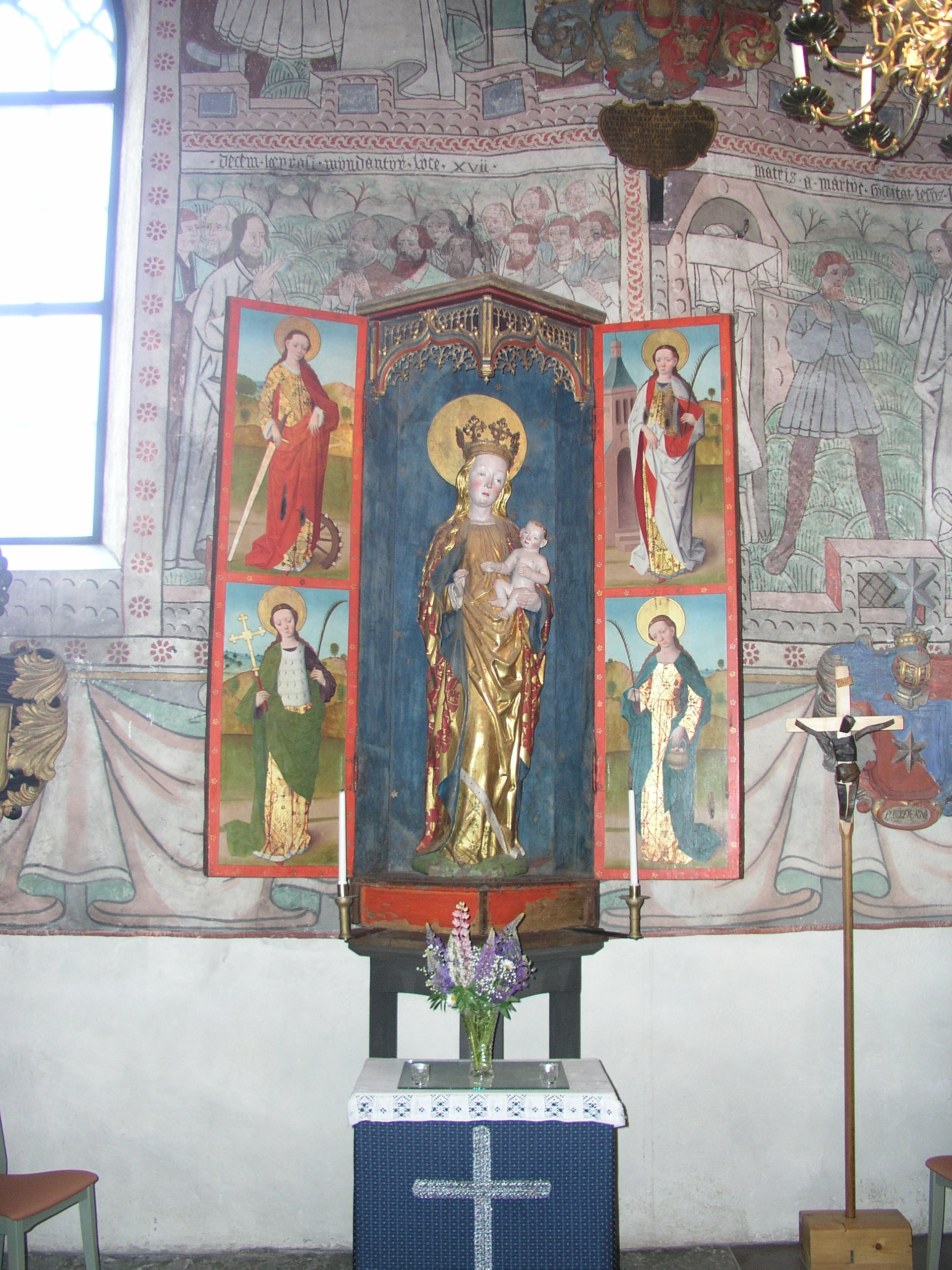
Altarpiece (Sorunda, Sweden), date unknown

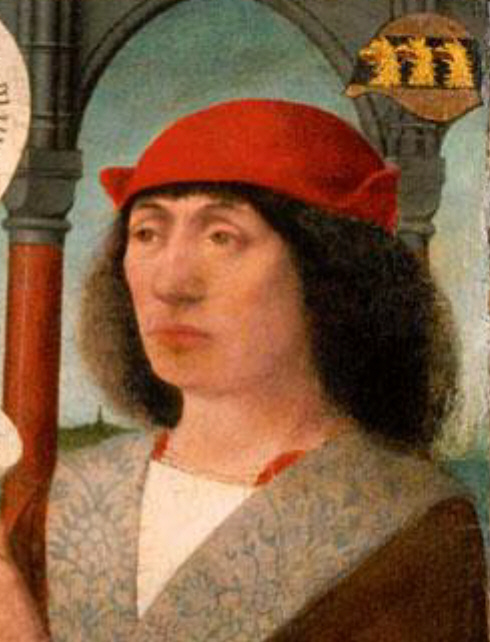
Portrait of Hinrich Lipperade, ca. 1480-1490
