= Brotherhood of Blackheads =

Association of merchants and ship owners in the Baltics, 1300s to date

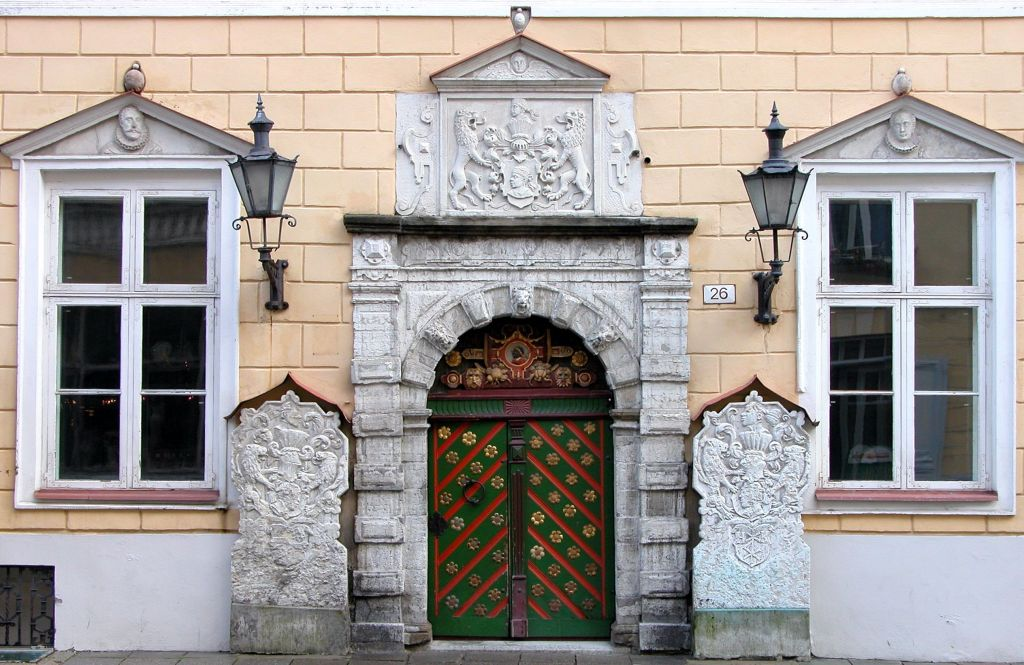
Facade of the House of Blackheads in Tallinn by Arent Passer.

The Brotherhood of Black Heads (German: Bruderschaft der Schwarzhäupter; Estonian: Mustpeade vennaskond; Latvian: Melngalvju brālība) is an association of local unmarried male merchants, ship-owners, and foreigners that was active in Livonia (present-day Estonia and Latvia) from the mid-14th century till 1940 but still remains active in present-day Hamburg. The Brotherhood of Black Heads originated as a military organization, but the non-military aspects of the association gradually became more pronounced until the Brotherhood became a predominantly social organization after the end (1721) of the Great Northern War.

== History ==
The brotherhood traces its origin to a group of foreign merchants who, according to the legend, had participated in the defense of Tallinn in Estonia during the Saint George's Night Uprising between 1343 and 1345 when the indigenous population of Estonia unsuccessfully tried to exterminate all foreigners and eradicate Christianity from Estonia. The earliest documented mention of the Brotherhood comes in an agreement with the Tallinn Dominican Monastery from 28 March 1400 that confirms the Blackheads' ownership of all the sacred church vessels that they had deposited in the St. Catherine's Church of the Dominicans. In the same agreement the Blackheads commit themselves to decorating and lighting the altar of St. Mary that the brotherhood had commissioned for the church, and the Dominicans in their turn undertake to hold services in front of this altar to bless the souls of the Blackheads. On 12 September 1407, the Tallinn City Council ratified the statutes of the Brotherhood, also known as the Great Rights. The statutes of the Brotherhood in Riga date back to 1416.

According to the Great Rights in Tallinn, the Brotherhood of Blackheads committed itself to defending the city from any enemy invasion. Among other duties, the Brotherhood provided the city with a cavalry detachment. The Blackhead cavalrymen patrolled the city wall and six of them made rounds inside the wall every evening after the city gates were locked at sunset. In 1526 the Brotherhood presented the city council of Tallinn with 8 rock-hurling machines, 20 cannon-carriages, and 66 small-caliber guns. Money was donated for making cannons for Narva, and it was stipulated that the Blackheads' coat of arms be on all the guns.

During the 25-year-long Livonian War (1558–1583), members of the Brotherhood of Blackheads in Tallinn participated in many battles and successfully helped to defend the city against the Russians who unsuccessfully besieged Tallinn in 1570–1571 and again in 1577.

After the end of the Great Northern War of 1700–1721, Livonia became part of the Russian Empire. The Hanseatic towns in Livonia lost much of the importance that they had enjoyed during the Middle Ages and the Brotherhood of Blackheads gradually transformed from a military society to a predominantly social organization. Although the chivalric code of honor the Brotherhood subscribed to and the rules governing close combat were mostly preserved, the military importance of Blackheads gradually diminished. However, in Tallinn the cavalry detachment with its own uniform survived until 1887.

In the 18th and 19th centuries, the local brotherhoods of Blackheads were important as social organizations that sponsored social events, such as parties and concerts, and collected objects of fine art. In Tallinn and Riga, the houses of the Brotherhood, along with the medieval traditions still practiced in them, became important cultural and social centers for social elites. In 1895, the Brotherhood of Blackheads in Tallinn was formally reconstituted into the Blackheads Club. The brotherhoods in Tallinn and Riga carried on in independent Estonia and Latvia until the beginning of the Soviet occupation of the Baltic States in 1940, when the occupation authorities dissolved the Brotherhood. Most of the members were able to flee to Germany, where they tried to continue their traditions. In 1961 the Brotherhood of Blackheads was officially registered in Hamburg, where it survives to this day.

== Membership ==
Originally the membership of the Brotherhood of Blackheads in Tallinn included mostly merchants who were not yet eligible for the membership in the Great Guild: merchants who were legally not independent or who had no established business in Tallinn, local unmarried merchants, and foreign merchants. Members also included goldsmiths, chemists, scholars, and school teachers. The Tallinn Brotherhood of Blackheads was governed by two Superiors elected from the members of the Brotherhood. In the course of time it became a custom that after getting married, the Blackheads joined the Great Guild. The members of the Brotherhood in Tallinn had free access to the Guildhall which they were able to use for their meetings until 1540, when they were ousted from there after a conflict between the Brotherhood and the Great Guild.

== Regional structure ==
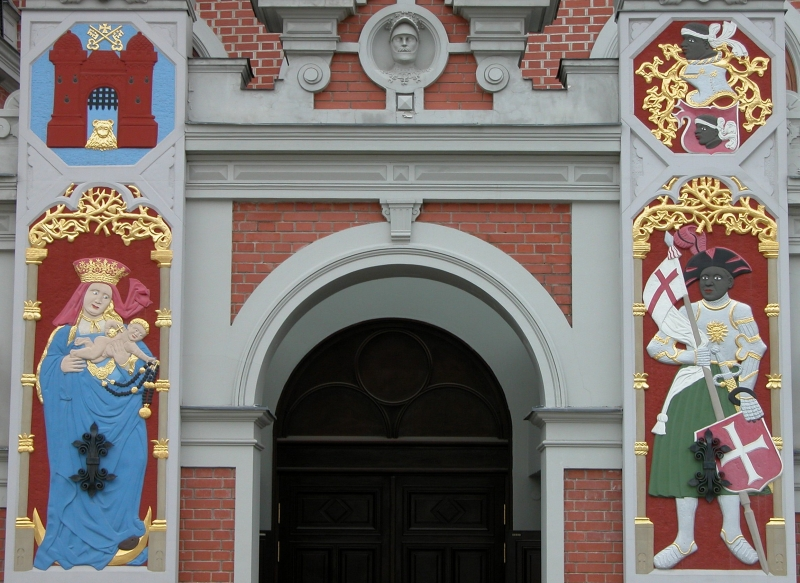
Portal of the House of Blackheads in Riga with reliefs of St. Mary and Saint Mauritius.

The Brotherhood of Blackheads was divided into local autonomous organizations that owned the so-called Blackhead Houses in more than 20 towns in Estonia and Latvia, including Tallinn, Riga, Tartu, and Pärnu. In the 17th century, a brotherhood of Blackheads was also established in Wismar, Germany. The House of the Brotherhood of Blackheads in Tallinn is the only one that has survived intact into the 21st century. The Brotherhood was renting the property at 24-26 Pikk Street, Tallinn, already in 1406. In 1531, the Blackheads acquired the building from the town councilor Johann Viant and his wife Kerstine Bretholt (Breitholtz) and rebuilt it in the Renaissance style of the period. It remained in the possession of the Blackheads until the summer of 1940 when the Soviet Union occupied and annexed Estonia. An equally magnificent House of Blackheads in Riga that had been sold to the Blackheads in 1713 was destroyed on 28 June 1941 when the German army conquered Riga, and the burnt-out walls were demolished by the Soviets in 1948. The Blackheads' House in Riga was reconstructed between 1995 and 2000.

== Daily life ==
During the Middle Ages, the established merchants from the Brotherhood of Blackheads in Tallinn, known as the "older bench", were required to attend daily meetings of the Great Guild in order to familiarize themselves with the current trade situation and the art of commerce in general. The members of the Brotherhood got together nearly every night to "rest from honest labor".

Twice a year the Brotherhood celebrated major holidays: at the end of the navigation season between December 24 and January 10, Christmas and New Year, and from Easter to the beginning of the navigation season. Both celebrations commenced with an official session where organizational matters were settled, and continued with feasts, dancing, and festivities that sometimes included the whole town.

The custom of erecting a Christmas tree can be historically traced to such activities in the 15th and 16th centuries. According to the first documented uses of a Christmas tree in Estonia, in 1441, 1442, and 1514 the Brotherhood erected a tree for the holidays in their brotherhood house in Tallinn. At the last night of the celebrations leading up to the holidays, the tree was taken to the Town Hall Square where the members of the brotherhood danced around it. In 1584, the pastor and chronicler Balthasar Russow wrote of an established tradition of setting up a decorated spruce at the market square in Tallinn where the young men “went with a flock of maidens and women, first sang and danced there and then set the tree aflame”. The first description of a Christmas tree used the Brotherhood in Riga in 1510 resembles the descriptions from Tallinn.

It was during the bi-annual celebrations that new members were accepted. Anyone who had visited the Brotherhood's feasts before deemed "worthy" could become a member. Names of new members were inscribed into the Book of the Brotherhood and all the members used their tall and slender goblets, known as "deer's feet", to drink to the health of the new brother. For a period of time the new members were expected to serve their "elder" brothers at the table and perform other duties.

Mutual relations between brothers were strictly regulated and any deviation from the established standard punished. In Tallinn, for example, if one cursed a brother member, he had to pay a fine of 1 mark; the fine was 2 marks if he hit him on the face or the ear, and 3 marks if he hit him again. There were stiffer fines for offenses carried out in public. Missing ceremonial meals, festivities, and church services were also penalized. Many of the fines had to be paid in wax which was a valuable commodity during the Middle Ages; wax was used for lighting up their own halls and churches that the local brotherhood patronized. A large fine – five pounds of wax – had to be paid by a brother who "grabbed another member by the hair or flung beer into his face".

== Symbols ==
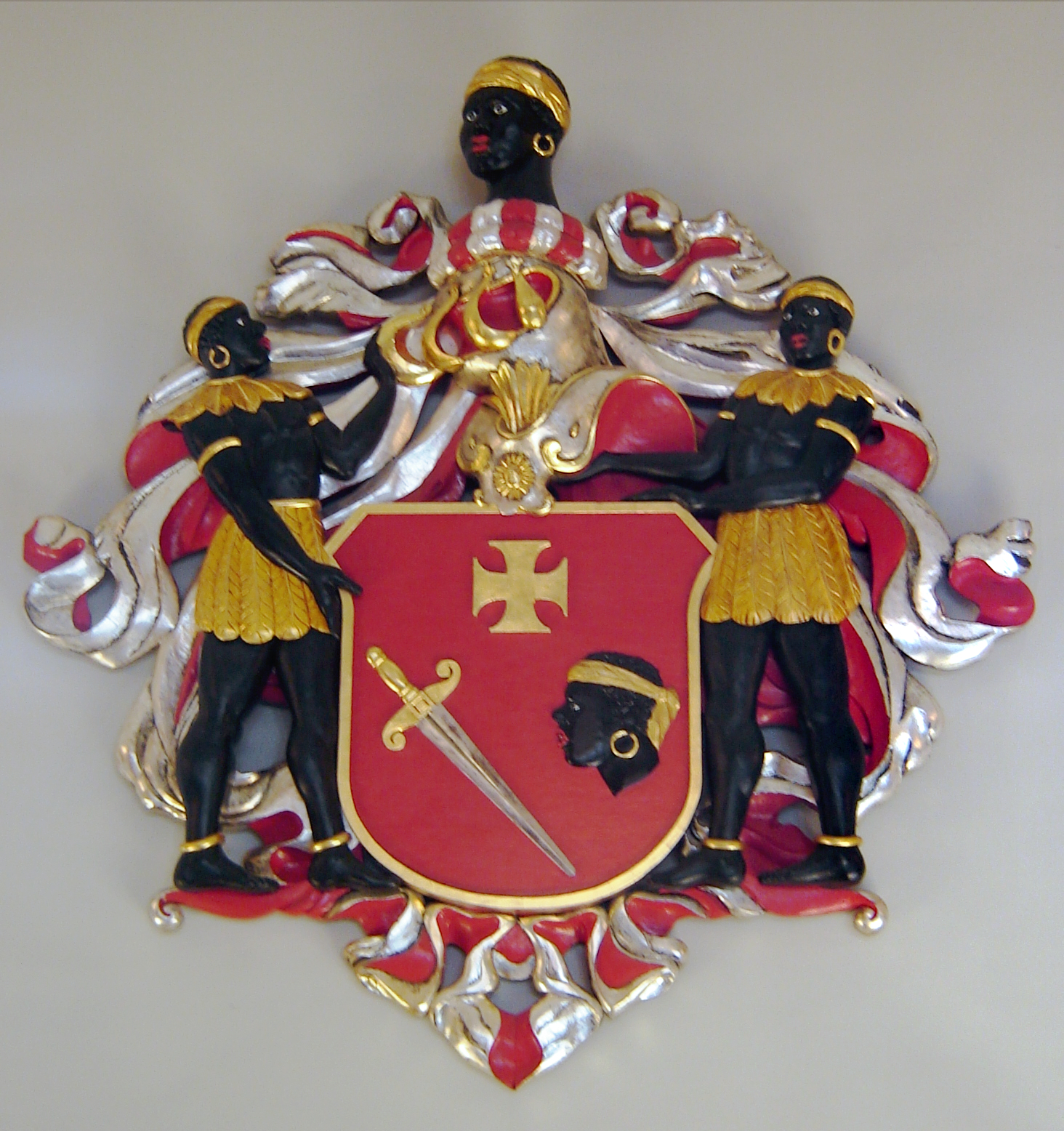
The coat of arms of the Brotherhood of Blackheads

The exact origin of the term blackhead is unknown. The patron saint of the Brotherhood of Blackheads is the black Egyptian Christian Saint Maurice whose head is also depicted on the Brotherhood's coat of arms. Whether the patron saint was chosen because of the name, or whether the saint precedes the name remains unclear.

== Significance and legacy ==
The origin and the dual nature of the Brotherhood of Blackheads as a military organization and a commercial association is unique in European history. The military aspect of the Brotherhood can be attributed to its founding during the days of the last great anti-Christian revolt of the indigenous people of Northern Europe in the wake of the Northern Crusades. The commercial aspect of the Brotherhood reflects its origin in the early days of the Hanseatic League that marked the beginning of a new era, less military and more commerce oriented, in Northern Europe.

Some traditions of the Blackheads survive in the customs of Baltic-German Corps and Estonian and Latvian student corporations. As a rule, most corporations accept new members twice a year. Ceremonial consumption of alcohol, elaborate drinking vessels, personal code of honor, and strict rules governing the relationship between members, including institutionalized fines and punishments, resemble in many respects the traditions of the Blackheads. The military aspect of the Brotherhood survives in the ceremonial use of specialized swords. In the regional structure of the Estonian Defence League, corporation members in the former Blackhead centers Tallinn and Tartu maintain their own military malevkonds (major subunits of malevs) whose main duty is the defence of their respective cities against possible enemy invasion.
