= Victor of Marseilles =

3rd-century Egyptian martyr and saint

Saint Victor of Marseilles
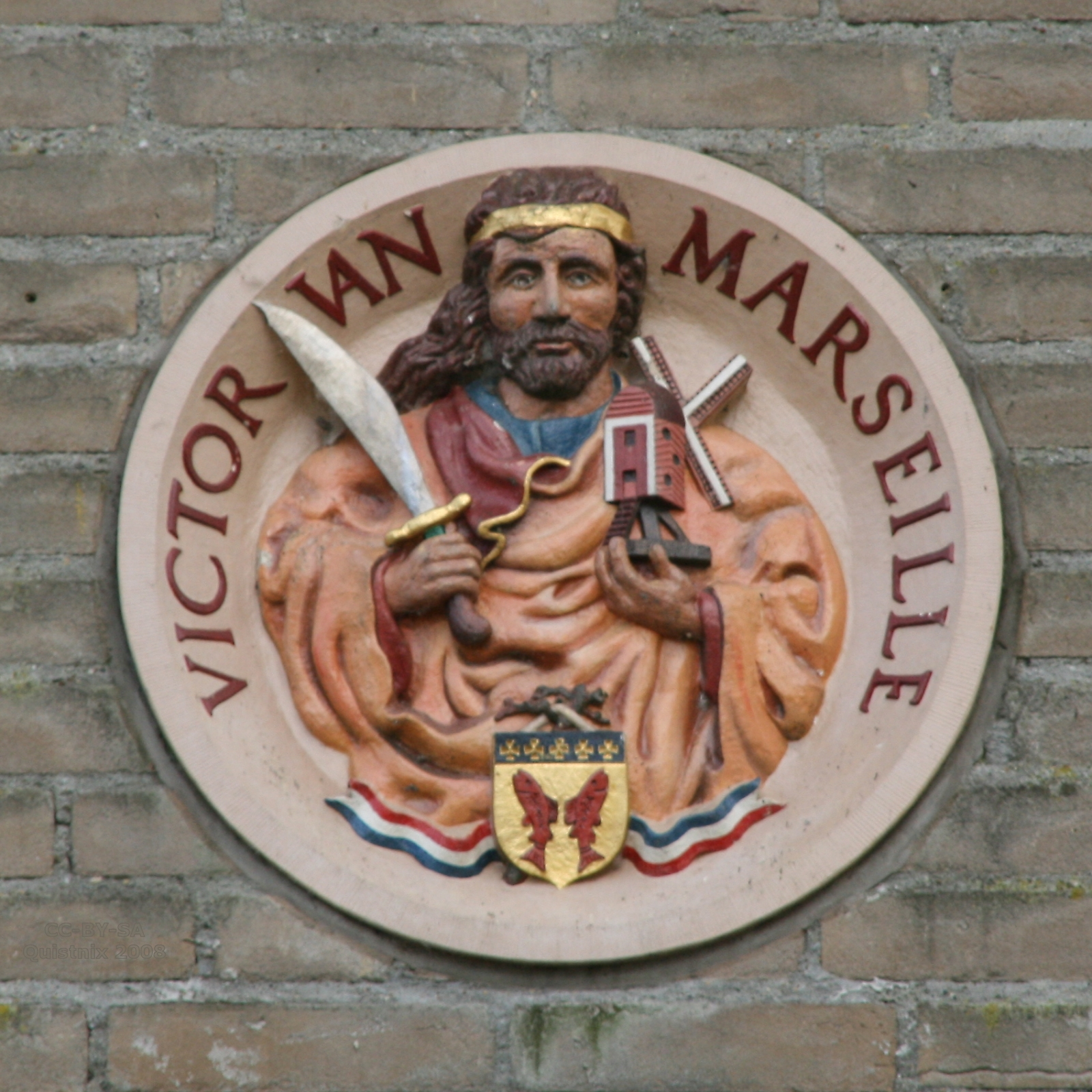

Martyr
- Born: 3rd century AD
- Died: c. 290 AD; Marseille
- Venerated in: Catholic Church; Oriental Orthodox Churches; Eastern Orthodox Church
- Feast: July 21
- Attributes: Depicted as a Roman soldier with a millstone; depicted overthrowing a statue of Jupiter; in stocks, comforted by angels; scourged and crushed by a millstone; or with his body beheaded and flung into the river, from which the angels take it; depicted with windmill
- Patronage: cabinetmakers, millers, torture victims, sick children; invoked against lightning

Victor of Marseilles (died c. 290) was an Egyptian Christian martyr. He is venerated as a saint in the Catholic Church, Oriental Orthodox Churches, and Eastern Orthodox Church.

== Life ==
Victor is said to have been a Roman army officer in Marseille, who publicly denounced the worship of idols. For that, he was brought before the Roman prefects, Asterius and Eutychius, who later sent him to the Emperor Maximian. He was then racked, beaten, dragged through the streets, and thrown into prison, where he converted three other Roman soldiers, Longinus, Alexander, and Felician, who were subsequently beheaded. After refusing to offer incense to a statue of the Roman god Jupiter, Victor kicked it over with his foot. The emperor ordered that he be put to death by being ground under a millstone, but the millstone broke while Victor was still alive. He was then beheaded.

== Veneration ==
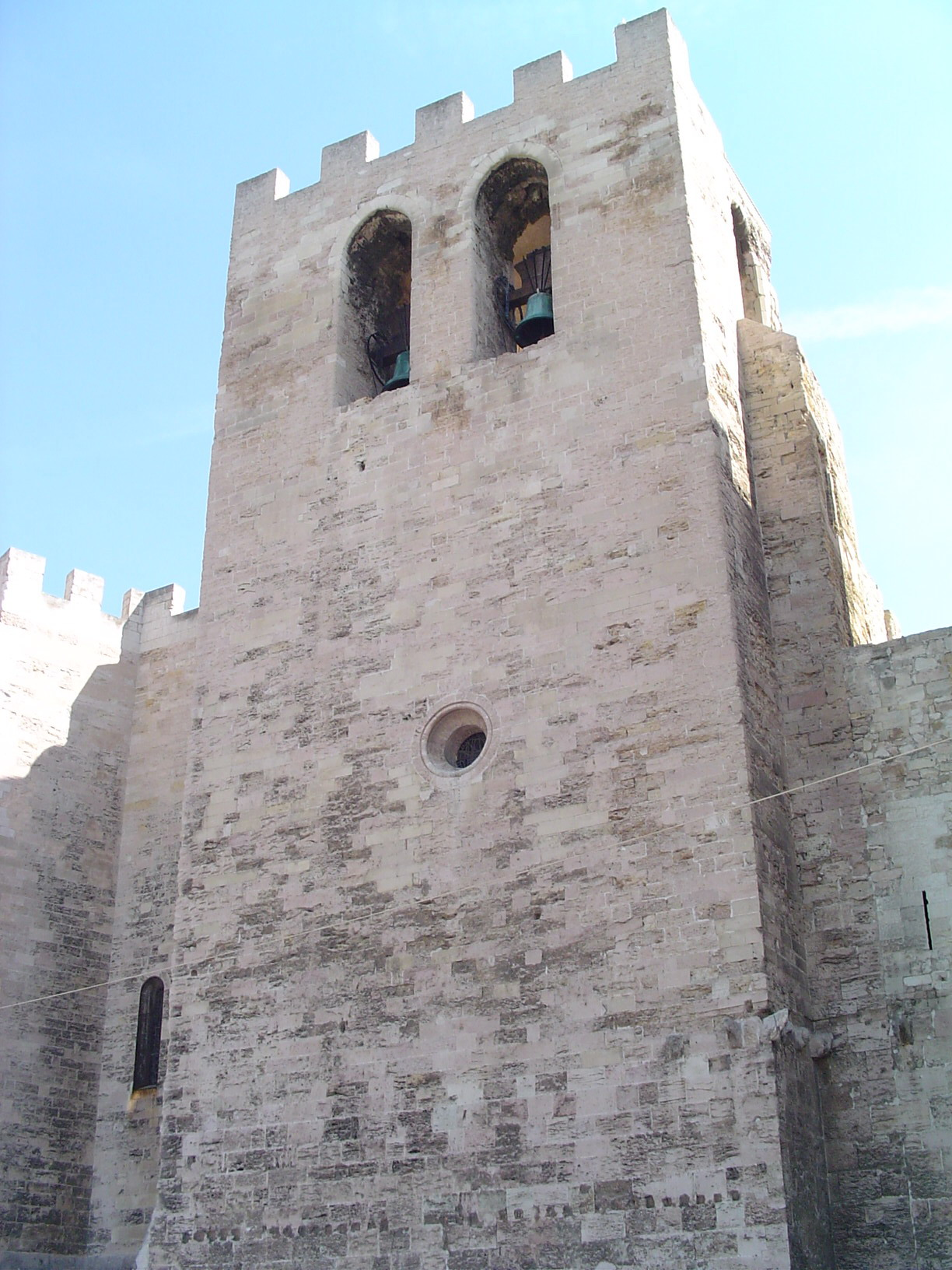
Abbey of St Victor

Victor and the three other Roman soldiers he converted – Longinus, Alexander and Felician – were killed near the end of the 3rd century. In the 4th century, John Cassian built a monastery over the site where their bodies had been buried in a cave, which later became a Benedictine abbey and minor basilica. This is the Abbey of St Victor (Abbaye Saint-Victor).

Saint Victor's feast day, along with Saints Longinus, Alexander and Felician, is celebrated on July 21.

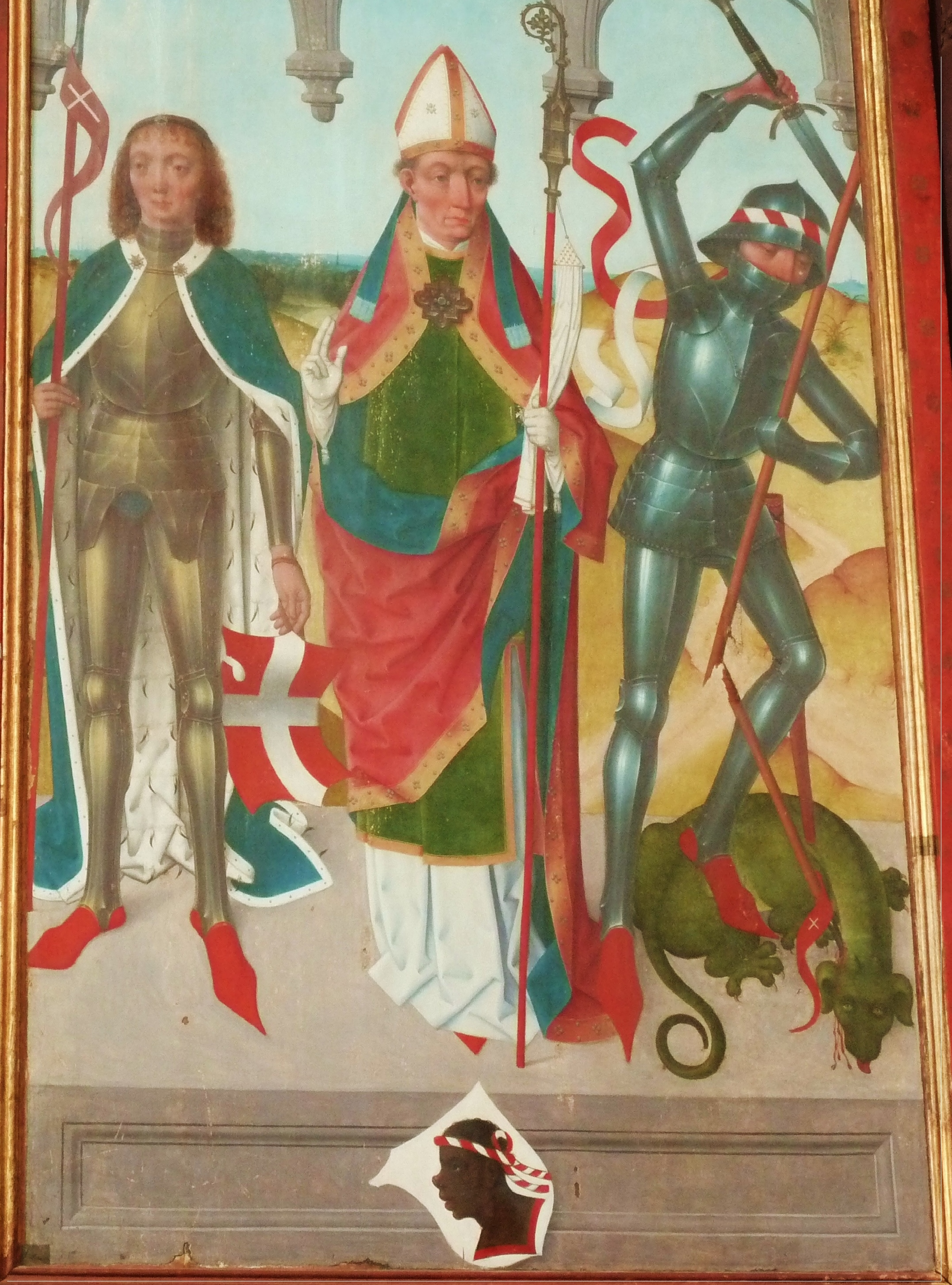
Saint Victor, Saint Nicholas, Saint George, and Saint Maurice at St. Nicholas Church, Tallinn

== Patronage ==
Victor is the patron saint of Tallinn, the capital of Estonia. His life and martyrdom are celebrated in the scenes depicted on the high altar of St. Nicholas' Church, Tallinn.
