= Sorunda =

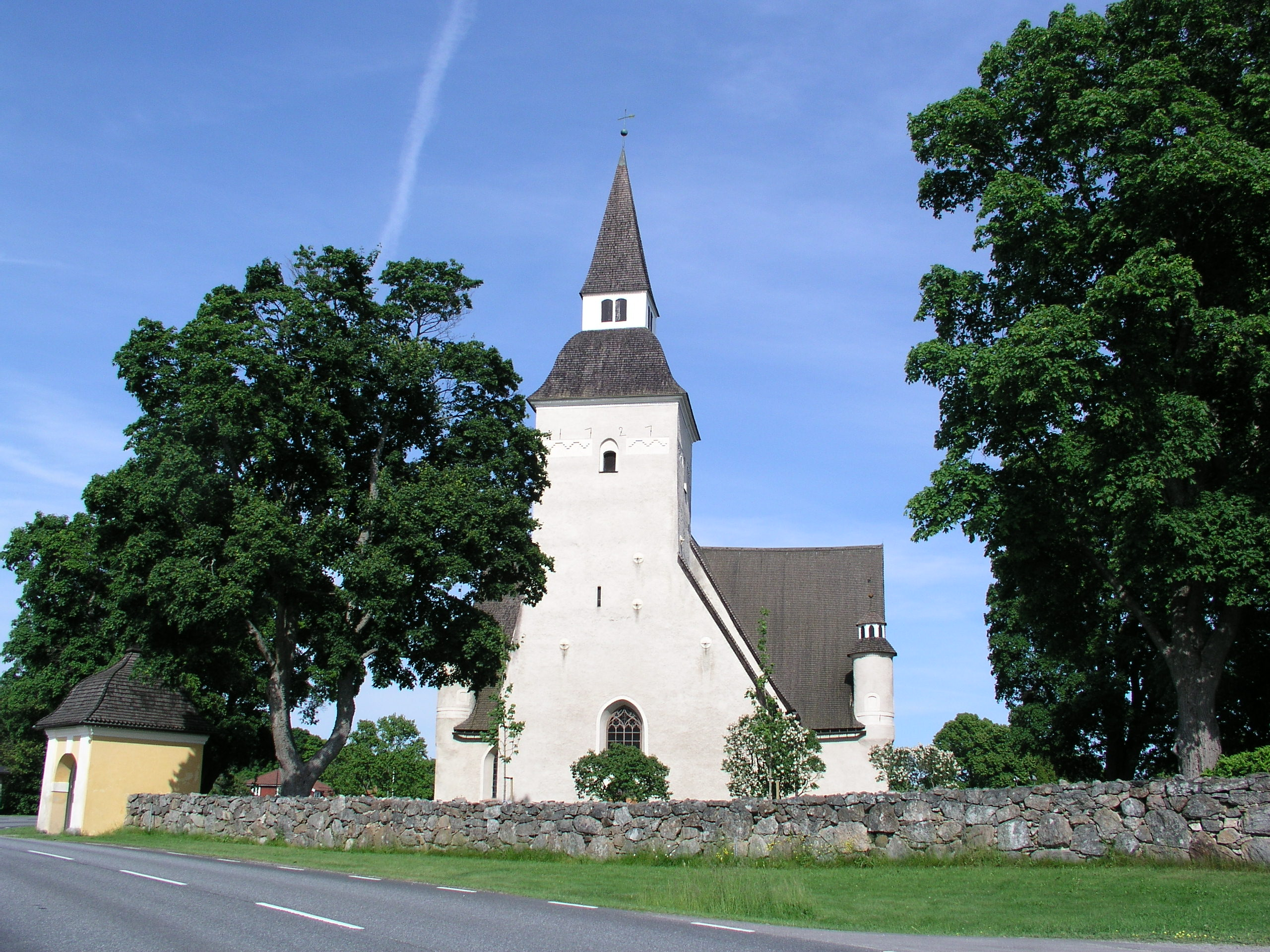
- Sorunda Church

- Location within Stockholm Location within Sweden Location within European Union
- Coordinates: 59°01′N 17°50′E
- Country: Sweden
- Province: Södermanland
- County: Stockholm County
- Municipality: Nynäshamn Municipality

Area
  - Total: 1.10 km^{2} (0.42 sq mi)

Population (31 December 2020)
  - Total: 1,319
  - Density: 1,200/km^{2} (3,110/sq mi)
- Time zone: UTC+1 (CET)
  - Summer (DST): UTC+2 (CEST)

Sorunda is a locality situated in Nynäshamn Municipality, Stockholm County, Sweden with 1,307 inhabitants in 2010. It is the hometown of Ulla Akselson, Moa Martinsson, and Harry Martinsson.

== Sorunda church ==
Sorunda church is an unusually large, medieval church. Its history goes back to the 12th century with major additions made in the 15th and 16th centuries. The church contains burial chapels for local aristocratic families and several interior details dating from the Middle Ages, notably an unusually fine wooden sculpture by Hermen Rode.

=== Gallery ===
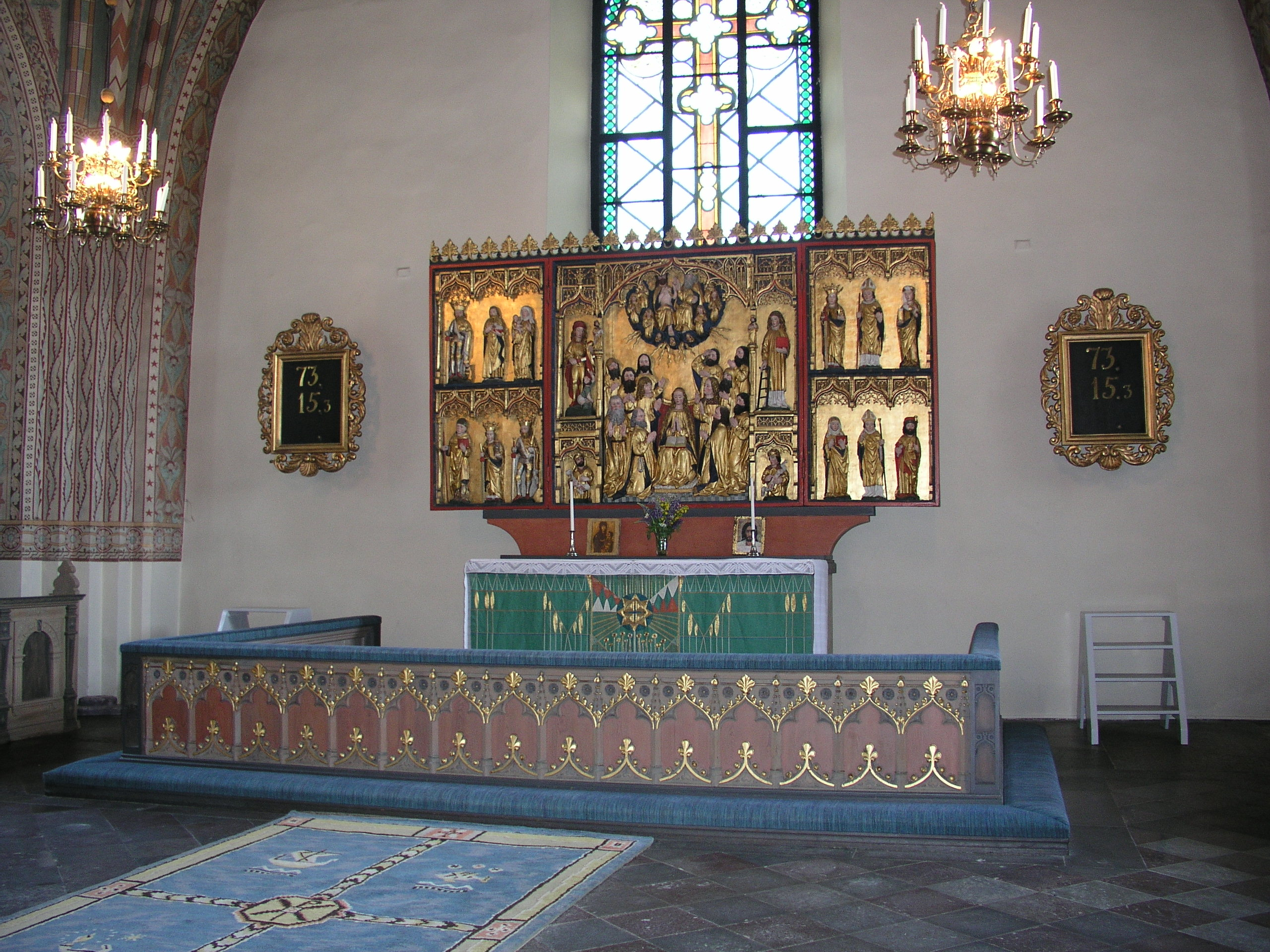
Interior view of Sorunda church

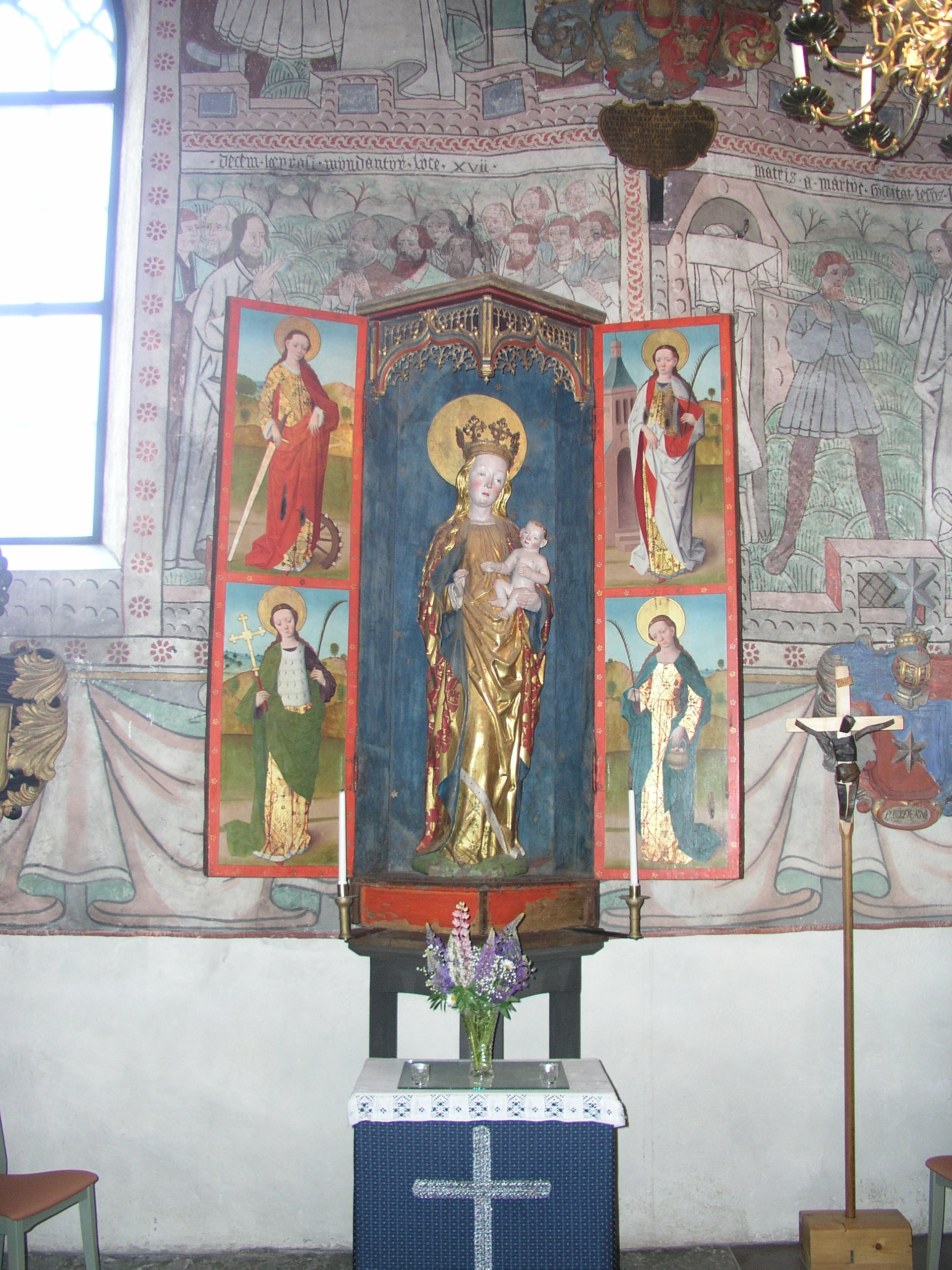
Altarpiece by Hermen Rode

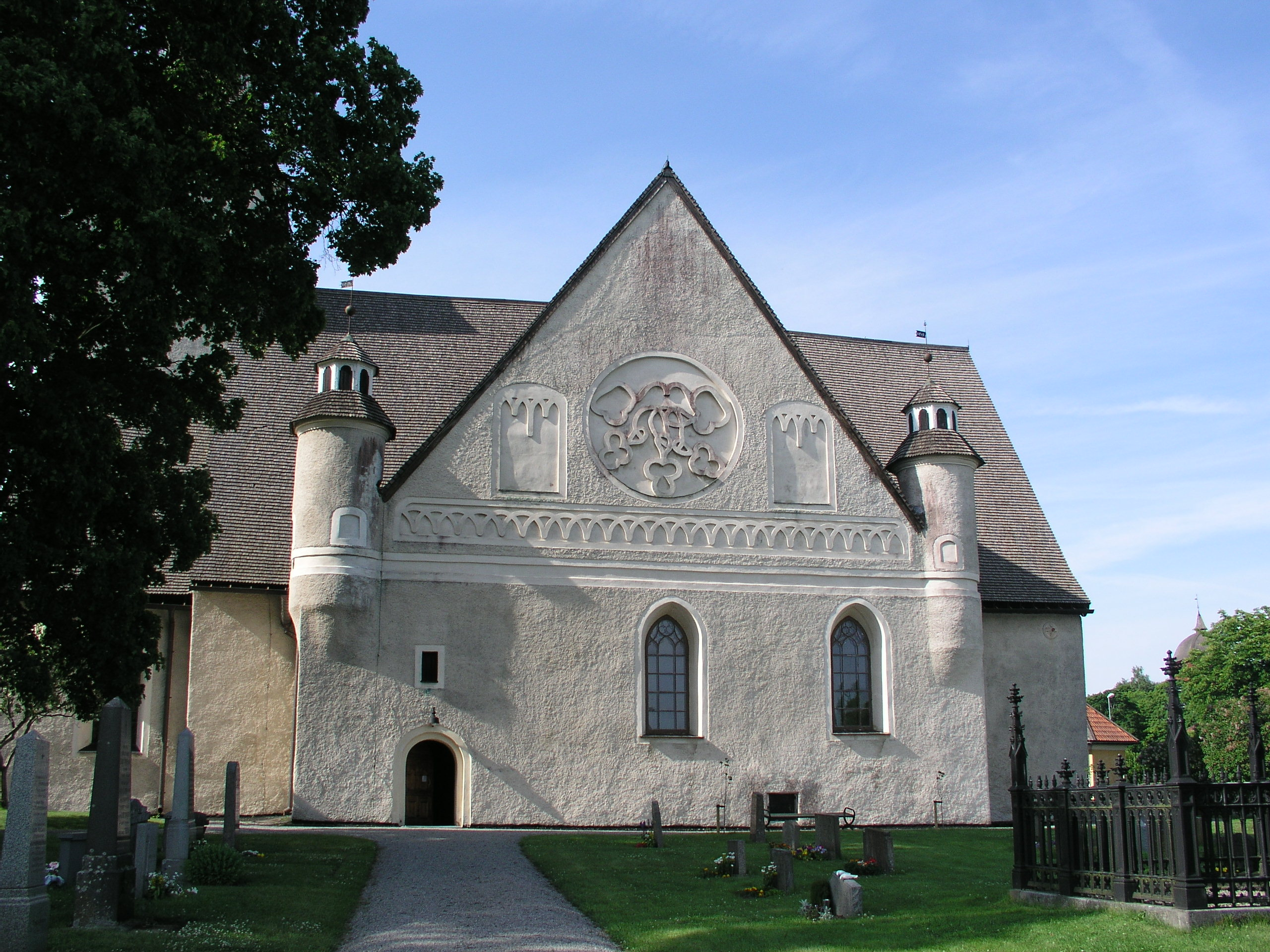
Exterior view, detail
