= Tobias Heinze =

Woodcarver who worked in Tallinn (17th century)

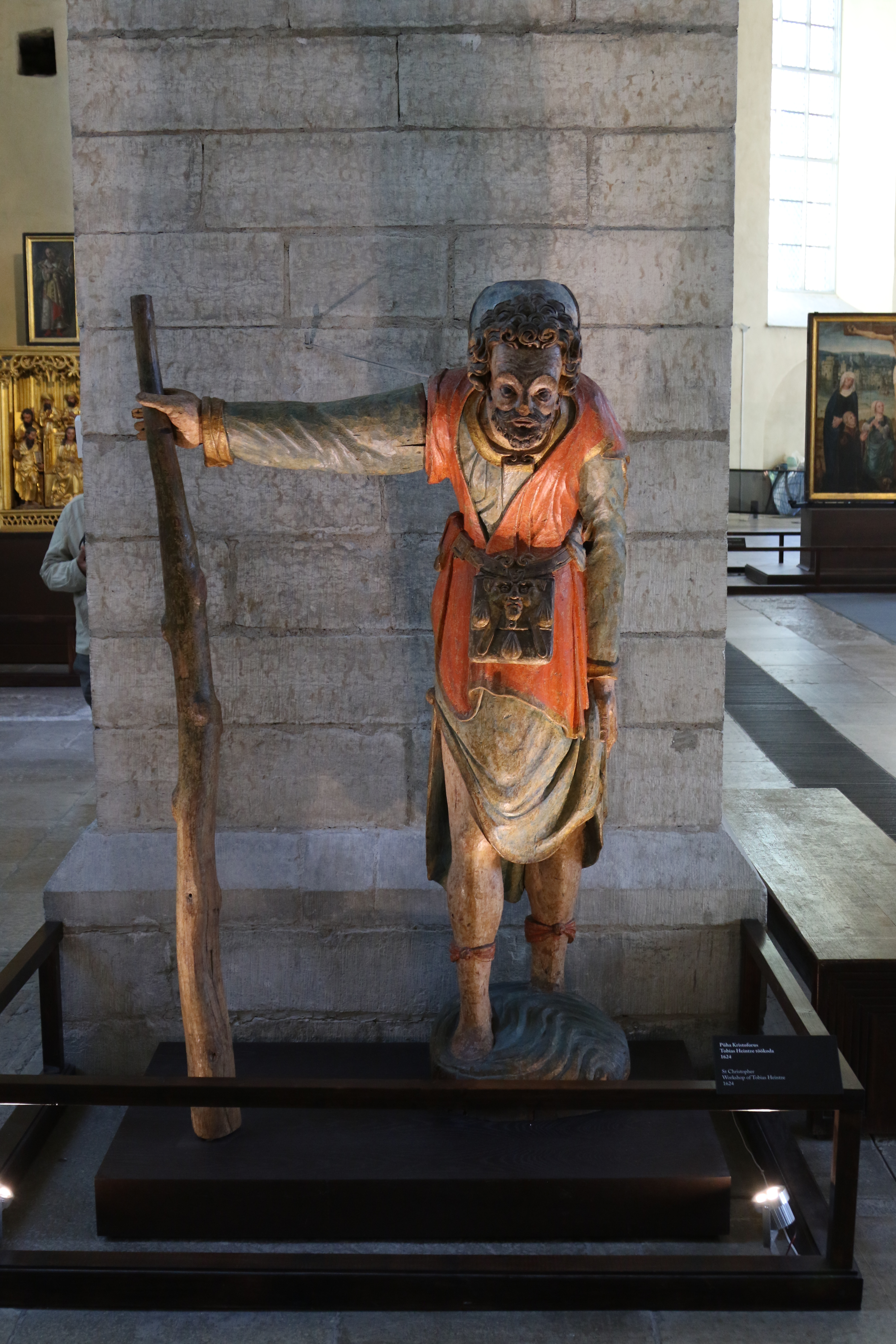
St Christopher in St. Nicholas' Church, Tallinn

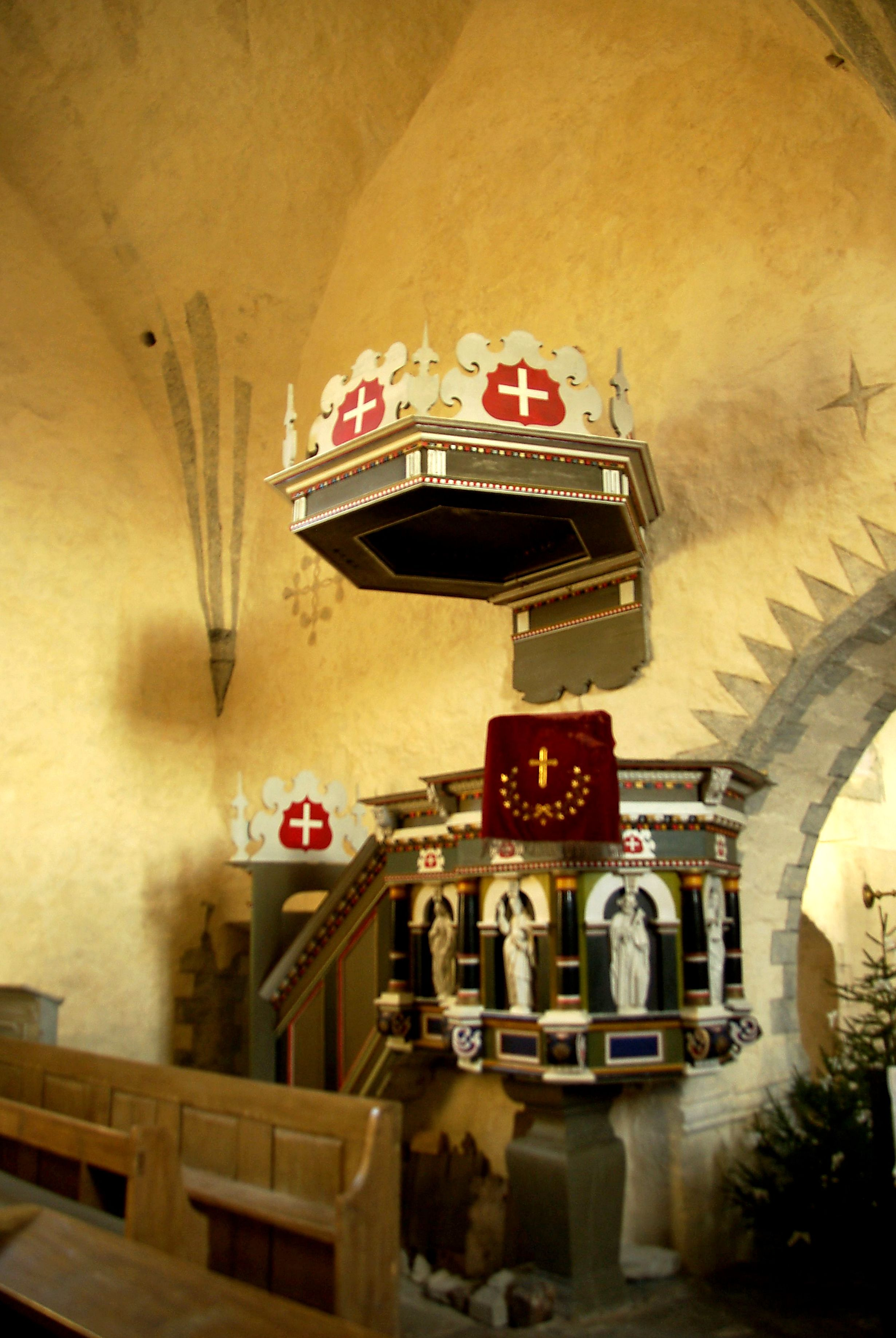
Pulpit in Harju-Risti church

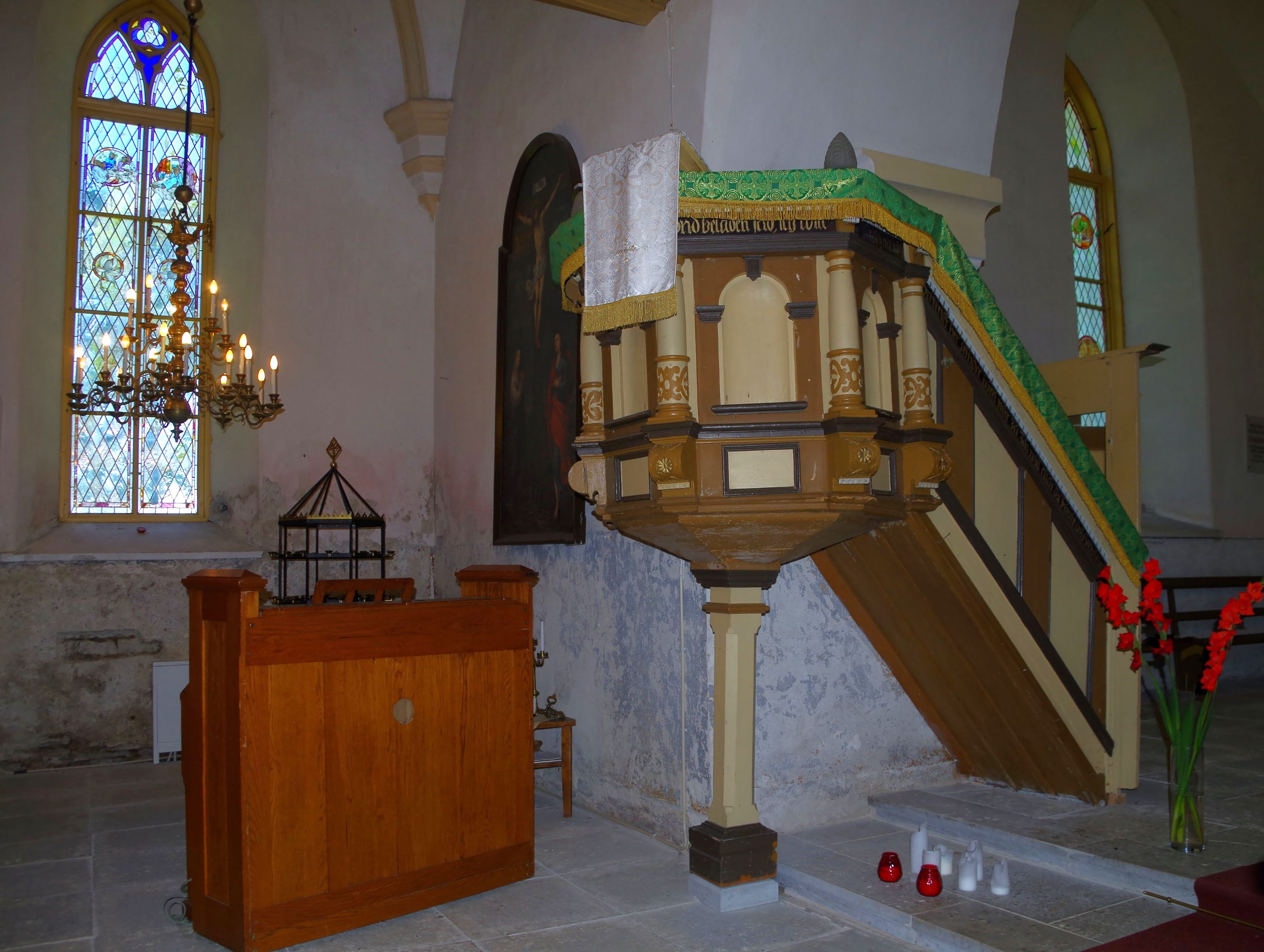
Pulpit in Jõelähtme church

Tobias Heinze (c. 1593–1653) (also Heintze) was an Estonian cabinetmaker and woodcarver based in Tallinn.

He is best known for his carving of St Christopher which stands in the church of St Nicholas’ in Tallinn. It was carved to support the pulpit. He also made modifications to the Holy Kinship altar which was originally in Tallinn town hall but bought by a rural congregation in 1652. This is now also preserved in St Nicholas' Church, Tallinn.

== List of works ==
- St Christopher statue, St. Nicholas' Church, Tallinn, Estonia. 1624
- Pulpit, Holy Cross Church, Harju-Risti, Estonia 1630
- Altar, Keila Church, Central Square, Keila, Estonia 1632
- Pulpit, Keila Church, Central Square, Keila, Estonia 1632
- Pulpit, St Nicholas’ Church, Kose, Estonia
- Pulpit, The Church of the Blessed Virgin Mary, Jõelähtme, Estonia
- Pulpit Leesi Church, 1646?
