= Harju-Risti =

Village in Estonia

Coordinates: 59°14′N 24°01′E

- Village
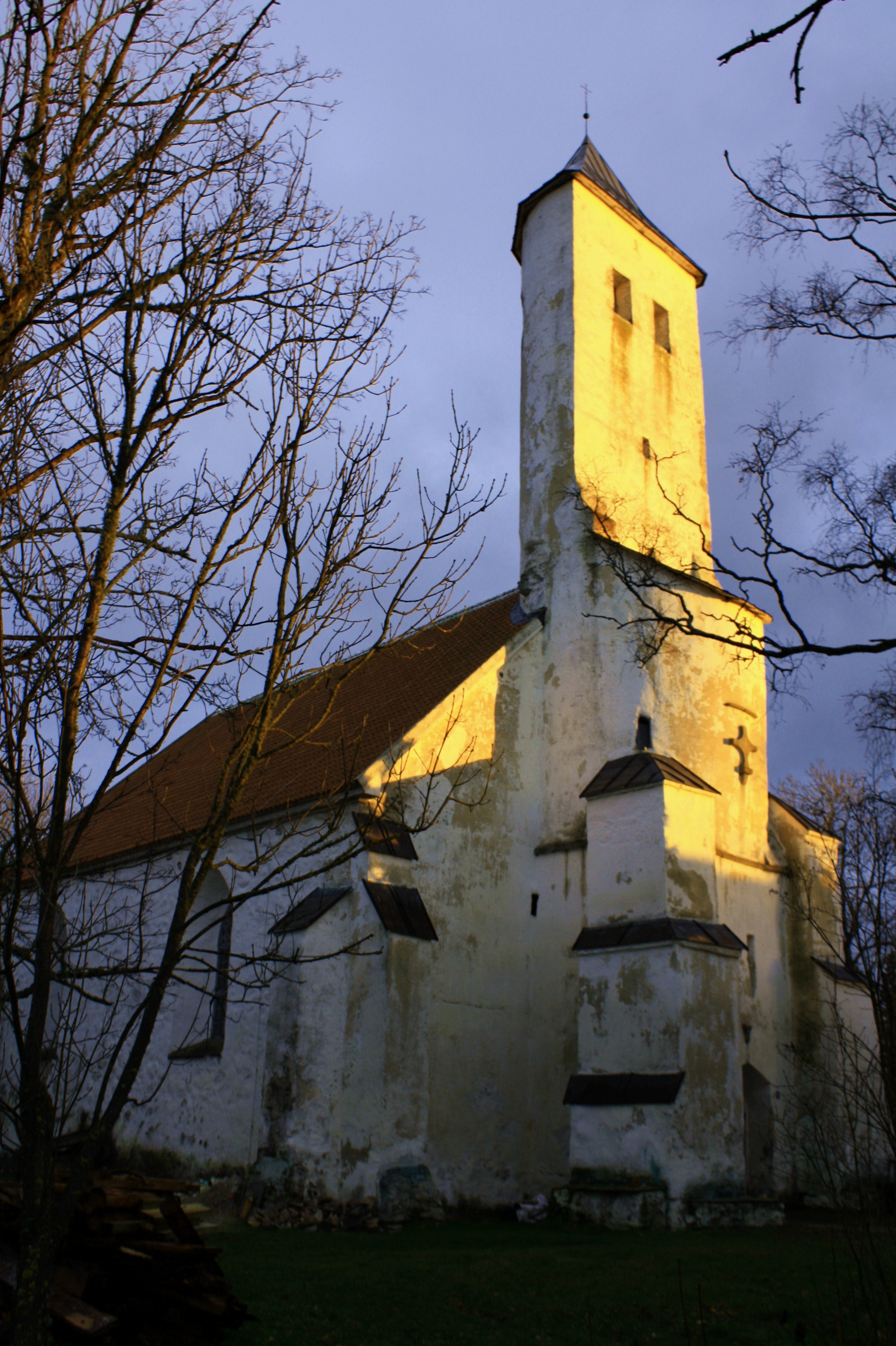
- Harju-Risti church
- Interactive map of Harju-Risti
- Country: Estonia
- County: Harju County
- Parish: Lääne-Harju Parish
- Time zone: UTC+2 (EET)
  - Summer (DST): UTC+3 (EEST)

Harju-Risti is a village in Lääne-Harju Parish, Harju County in northern Estonia.

== Harju-Risti Church ==
The church dedicated to the Holy Cross was founded by the monks of Padise Abbey around 1330 as a chapel. Following the St. George's Night Uprising construction was halted until the early 15th century. During the Livonian War, the church was damaged; however, the greatest threat to the building has been that it stands on unstable ground and has been sinking into the ground. In the 17th century, the ceiling of the choir collapsed, followed by parts of the unusual, round western tower. In this way the church acquired its present oddly-shaped look. The interior of the church as tombstones from the 15th century, a Renaissance pulpit by Tobias Heinze and Estonia's oldest church bell (14th century).
