= Hoppenstedt (Osterwieck) =

- Ortsteil of Osterwieck
- Interactive map of Hoppenstedt
- Location within Germany Location within Saxony-Anhalt
- Coordinates: 51°59′40″N 10°39′30″E
- Country: Germany
- State: Saxony-Anhalt
- District: Harz
- Town: Osterwieck
- Elevation: 105 m (344 ft)
- Time zone: UTC+01:00 (CET)
  - Summer (DST): UTC+02:00 (CEST)
- Postal codes: 38835
- Dialling codes: 039421

Hoppenstedt is a village in the municipality of Osterwieck in the northern Harz Foreland, Germany. The town Osterwieck lies about 4.5 kilometres to the southeast and the Lower Saxon state border is about 3 kilometres away.

== Location ==
The village lies below the Kleiner Fallstein on the right bank of the Ilse. The terrain climbs from about 100 metres in the valley to almost 180 metres. On the northern edge of the village is an abandoned limestone quarry that was worked from 1905 to 1972 and which is a protected landscape today. Just to the east is the Kleiner Fallstein Nature Reserve that was established in 1961.
