= Master of Liesborn =

German painter

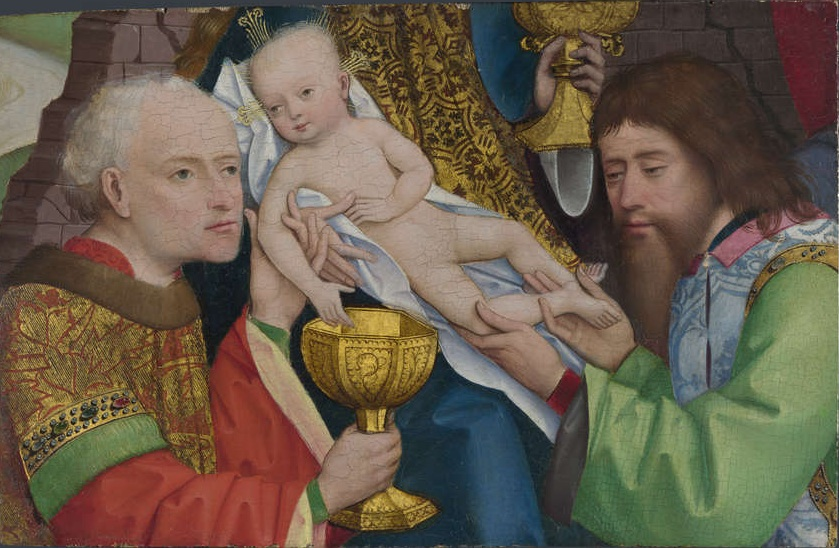
Adoration of the Magi (fragment), Master of Liesborn

The Master of Liesborn was a Westphalian painter, of the fifteenth century, who remains anonymous.

== Works ==
In 1465 the unknown painter executed an altar-piece of note in the Benedictine Liesborn Abbey. His name is not mentioned by the historian of the monastery, who, however, declares that the Greeks would have looked on him as an artist of the first rank.

On the suppression of the monastery in 1807, the work was sold, divided into parts, and thus scattered. The principal parts, some of them fragmentary, are now to be found in the National Gallery, London, in the LWL-Landesmuseum für Kunst und Kulturgeschichte in Münster, the Museum of Fine Arts of Budapest and in private hands. A small number are displayed in the museum now open in part of the abbey's premises.

An idea of the altar-piece may be formed from a copy in a church at Lünen. The altar did not have folding wings, as was customary, but instead the paintings were placed side by side on a long panel. In the centre was the Redeemer on the Cross, with Mary on one side with Saints Cosmas and Damian, and on the other side Saints John, Scholastica and Benedict. Four angels caught the blood which poured from the wounds. The head of the Saviour is still preserved, as are the busts of the saints, and several angels with golden chalices. The background is also golden. Four scenes chosen from sacred history were reproduced on the sides.

The painting of the Annunciation represents a double apartment with vaulted ceiling, the front room being represented as an oratory and the other as a sleeping chamber: the marble floor, the damask curtains which surround the bed, a wardrobe, a bench some vases, and writing material, are all carefully drawn and with due regard for perspective; the arched doorway and the partition wall are adorned with figures of Prophets and Christ, and a representation of the world. The window looks out on a landscape. The Blessed Virgin, clad in a blue mantle over a robe of gold brocade, is seen in the front room turning from her prie-dieu towards the angel, who, richly robed and bearing in his left hand a sceptre, delivers his greeting. Of the Nativity group, there still remain five beautiful angels, who kneel on the ground around the effulgent form of the Child: there also remain two busts of male figures which were probably part of this scene. Of the "Adoration of the Magi" there remains only a single fragment. The "Presentation in the Temple" shows a venerable priest, to whom the Mother presents her Child laid on a white cloth: three witnesses surround the priest, while the mother is attended by two maidservants carrying the doves. Several panels have been lost.

The Liesborn artist is not as skilfully realistic as van Eyck, but his most characteristic claim to fame lies in the purity of his taste. The master's influence is evident in other works, but no second work can be attributed directly to him.

== Sources ==
- Catholic Encyclopedia: Master of Liesborn
- Museum Abtei Liesborn: Mittelalterliche Altarbilder: Der Meister von Liesborn (in German)
- National Gallery: List of works by the Master of Liesborn, with images
- National Gallery: The Annunciation
- Guardian Arts: Crucifixion with Saints
