= Franz Hoppenstätt =

Baltic German wood carver of the Early Baroque

Franz Hoppenstätt (died 1657 or 1658) was a German-Estonian wood carver.

== Life and works ==
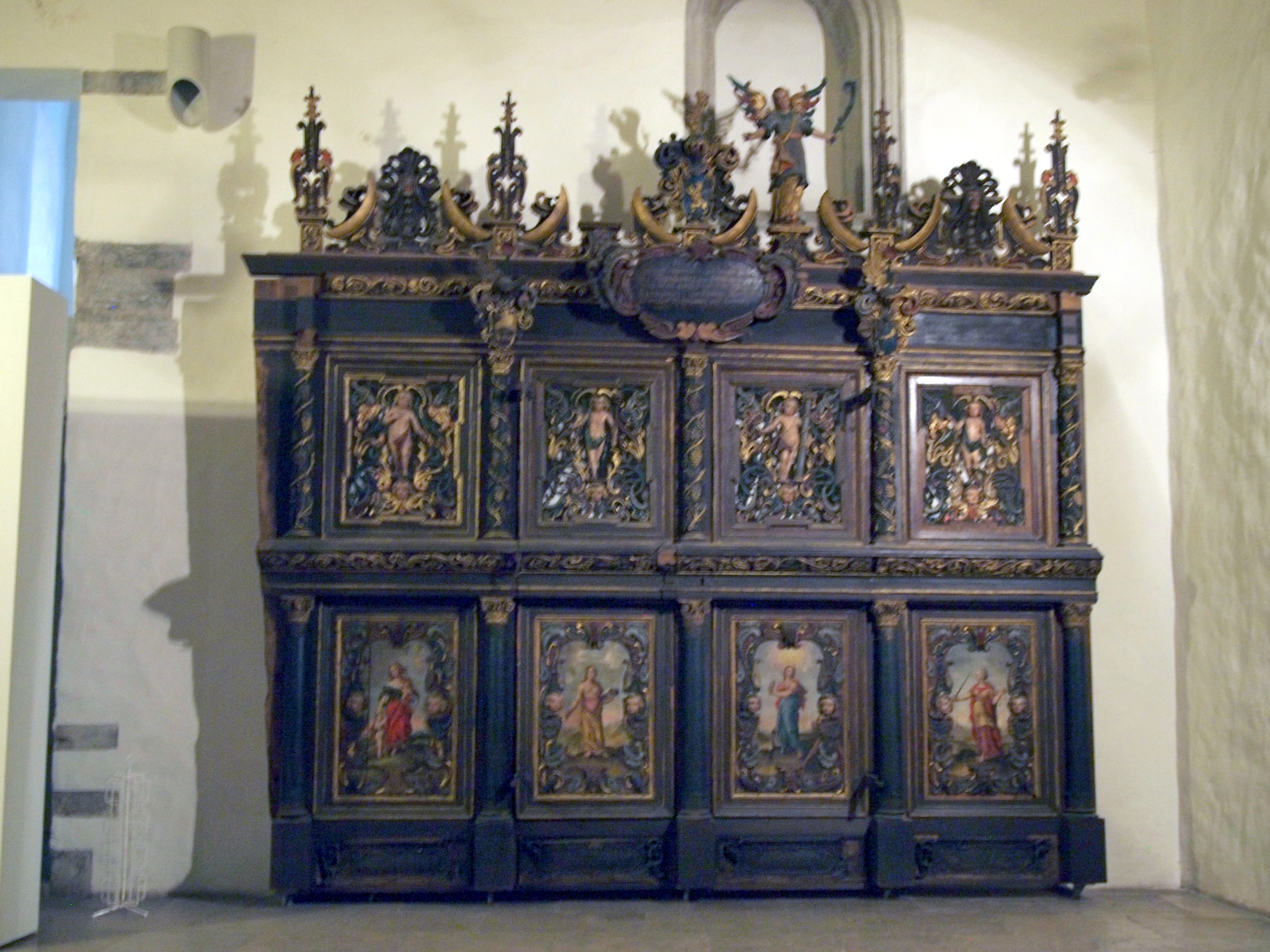
Funerary chapel of Bogislaus von Rosen in St. Nicholas' Church, Tallinn.

Franz Hoppenstätt probably came originally from Bremen. His work is evident in Estonia from the 1640s. From 1653 he was a citizen of Tallinn. There he worked as a wood carver. His Early Baroque works that were decorated with splendid acanthus ornamentation have become famous.

Particularly well known works include:

- The coloured pulpit of the church of Järva-Jaani made by Hoppenstätt with its magnificent carvings (1648)
- The decorated wall of the funerary chapel of Bogislaus von Rosen in St. Nicholas' Church, Tallinn (1655)
- The door of the house, Pikk tänav 71, in the old town of Tallinn.

None of the works bear Hoppenstätt's signature, so their attribution to him remains in doubt; but all three works are by the same artist.

Hoppenstätt died in the late 1650s, probably of the plague.

== See also ==
- List of Baltic German artists
