= House of the Blackheads (Tallinn) =

Building in Tallinn

Coordinates: 59.438807°N 24.746707°E

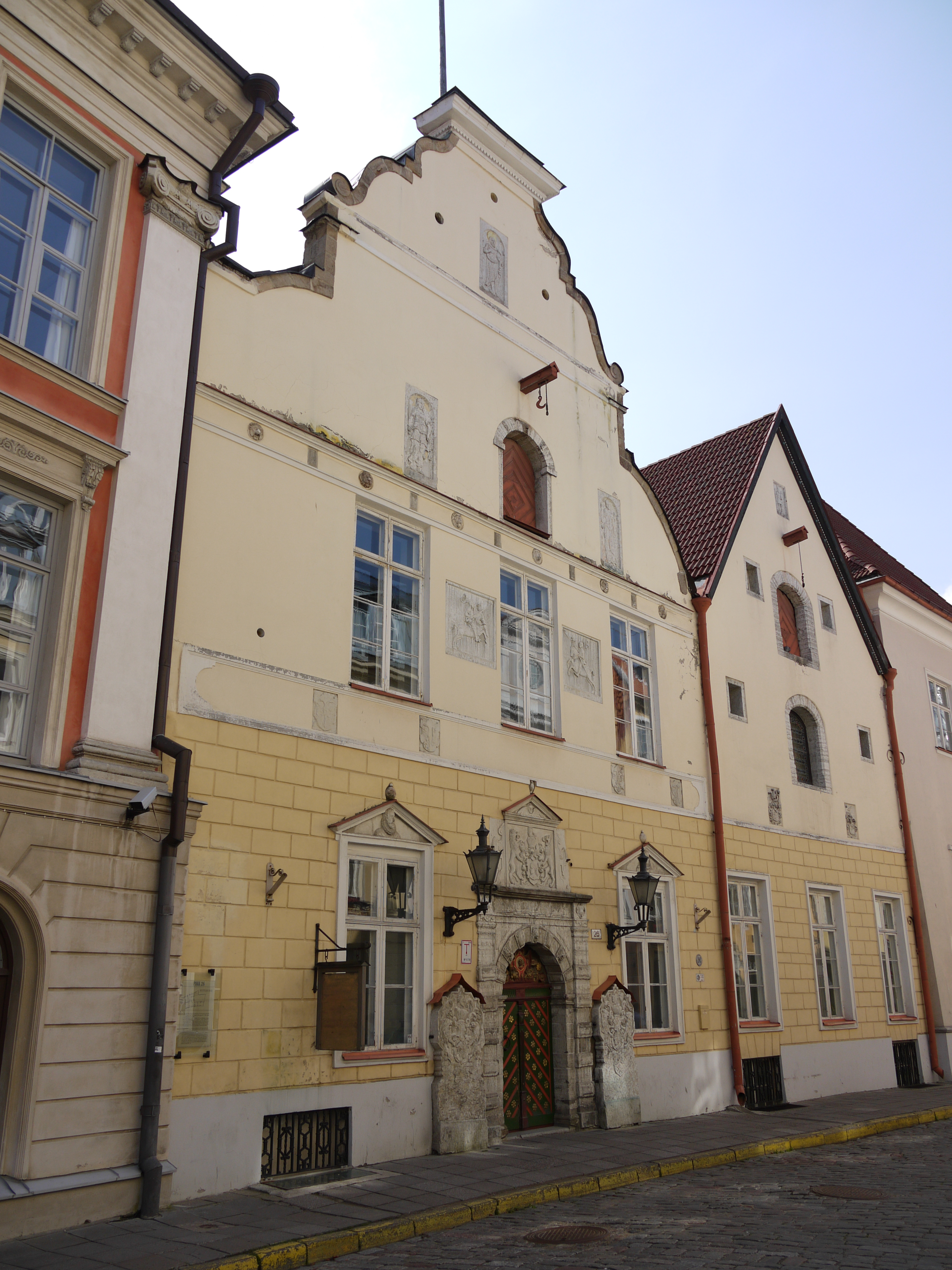
House of the Blackheads in Tallinn

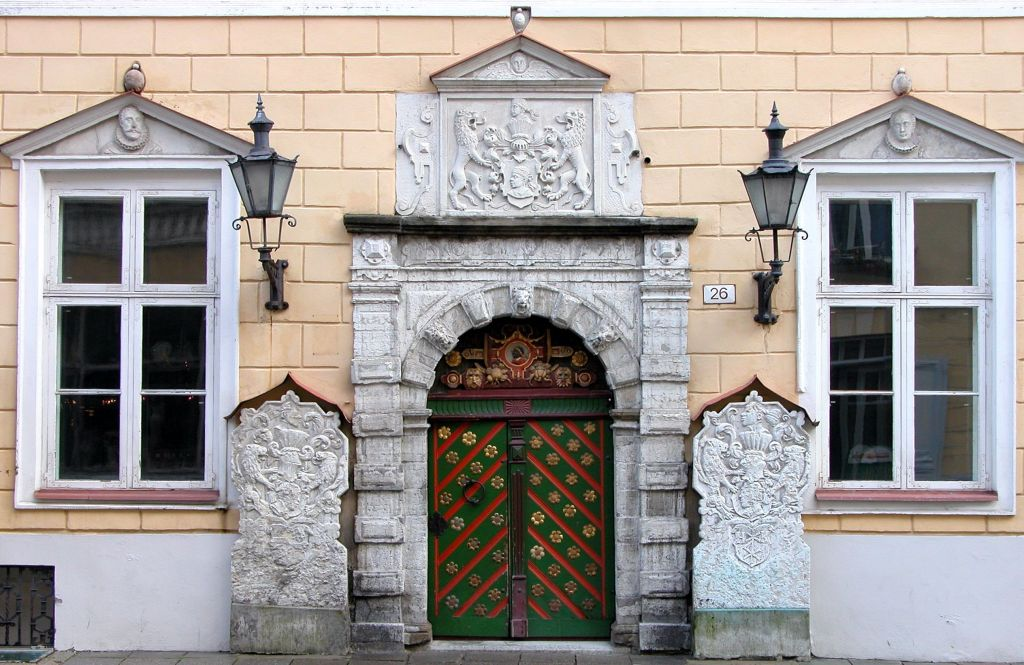
Tallinn Schwarzhäupterhaus

House of the Blackheads (Estonian: Mustpeade maja), or House of the Brotherhood of Black Heads, in Tallinn, the capital of Estonia, is a former headquarters of the Brotherhood of Blackheads. Historically this was a professional association of ship owners, merchants and foreigners dating from the 14th century. They were active in Livonia (present-day Estonia and Latvia) but fled to Germany during the Soviet occupation of the Baltic States in 1940. The House of the Blackheads was visited by several Russian Emperors including Peter I, Paul I and Alexander I who also became honorable members the Brotherhood.

The building was acquired by this organization in 1517. In 1597 it was renovated under supervision of the architect Arent Passer. The façade was rebuilt in the style of Renaissance architecture from the Low Countries. The painted doors date from the 1640s. A Maure, a symbol of Saint Maurice, the patron saint of the Brotherhood, appears both carved in wood and sculpted in stone above the door.

The House of the Brotherhood of Black Heads today comprises three separate buildings, and has four halls and several other rooms which are used for a variety of events. The White Hall was built in 1531–32, but was remodelled during reconstruction work between 1909 and 1911. St. Olaf’s Guild Hall, whose interior architecture comes from the early 15th century, was purchased by the Blackheads in 1919 and was remodeled between 1919 and 1922.

== Gallery ==
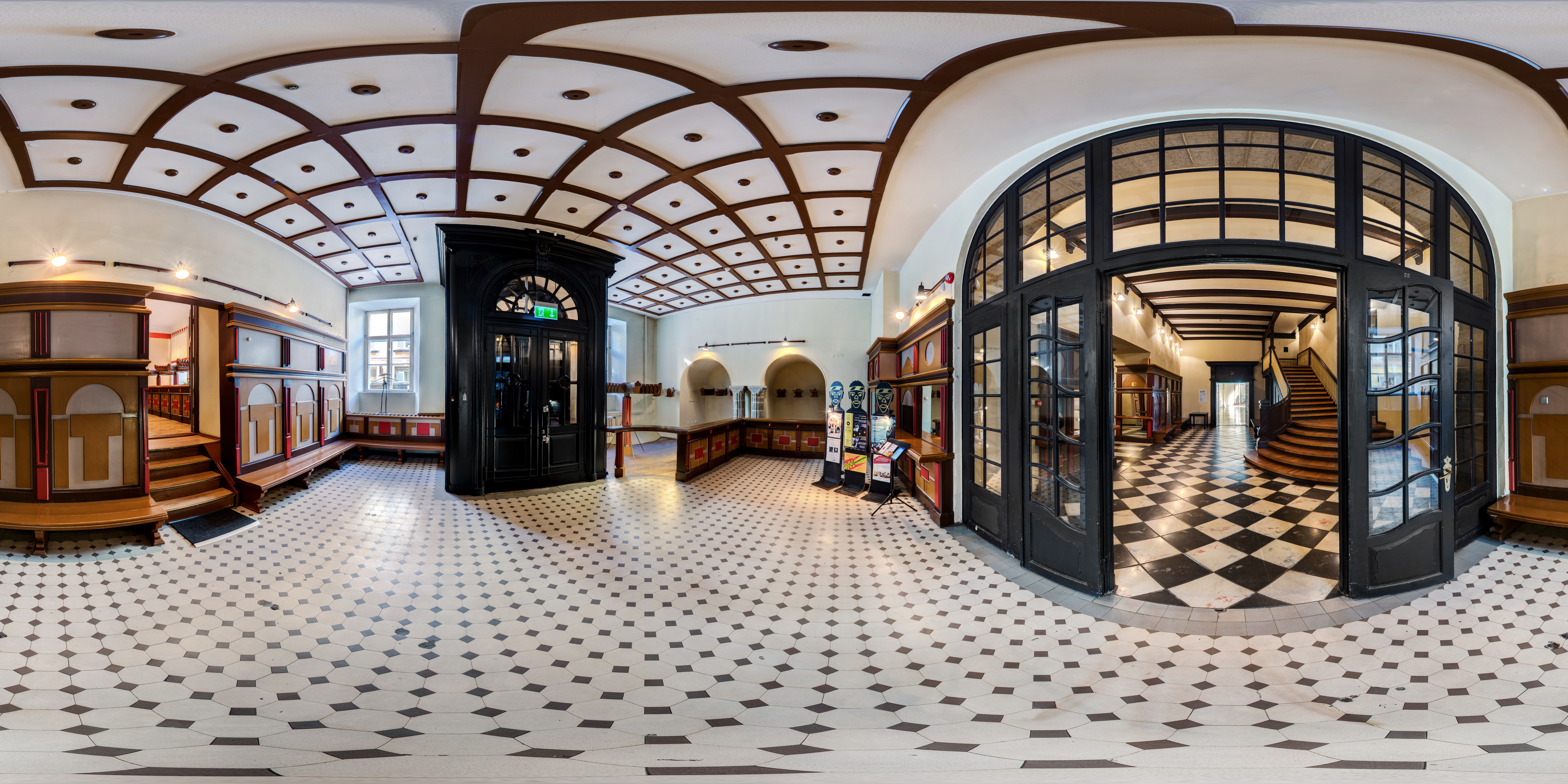

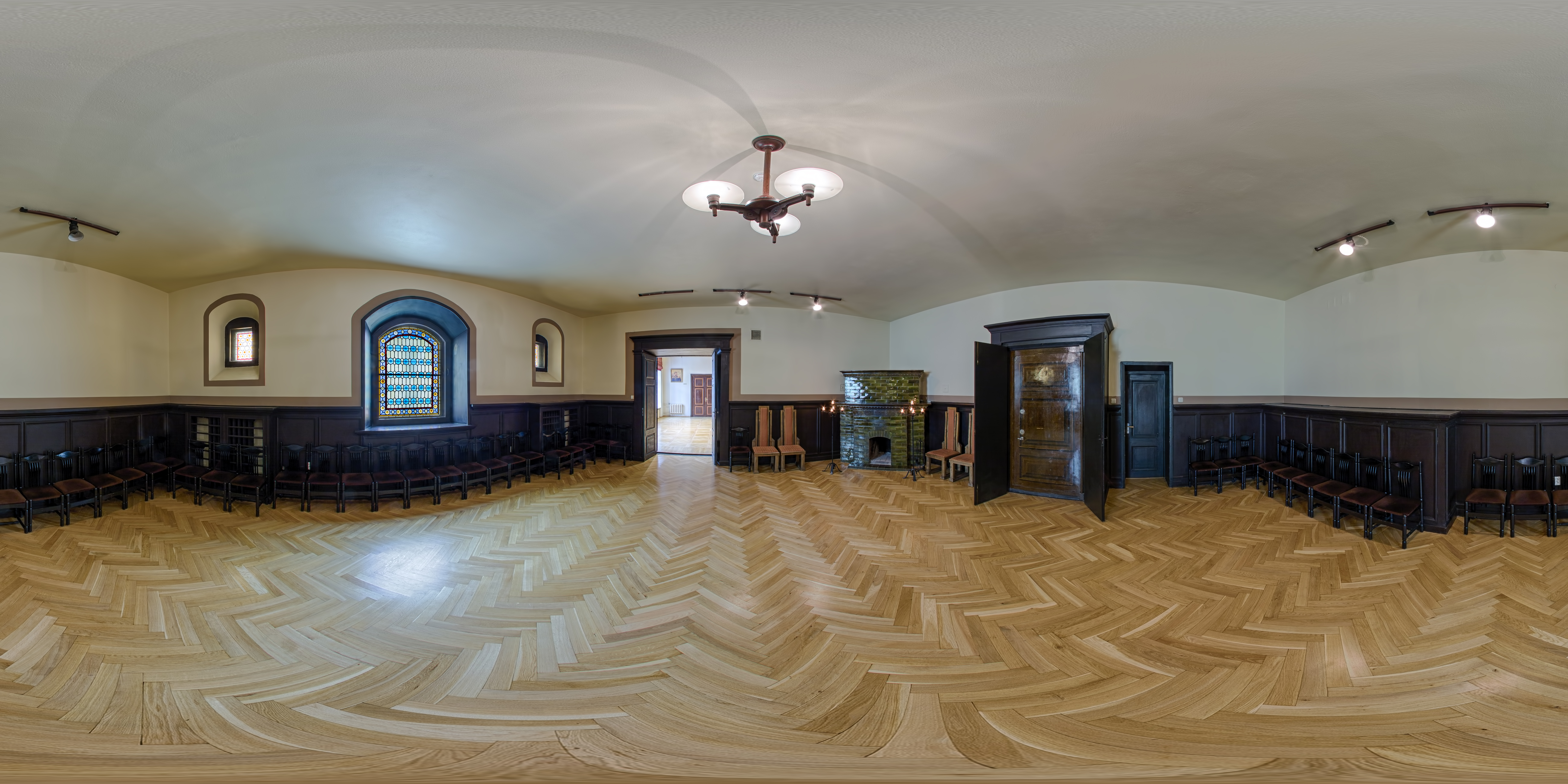

== See also ==
- House of the Blackheads, Riga, Latvia
