= House of the Blackheads (Riga) =

Historic building in Riga, Latvia

Coordinates: 56°56′50″N 24°06′25″E

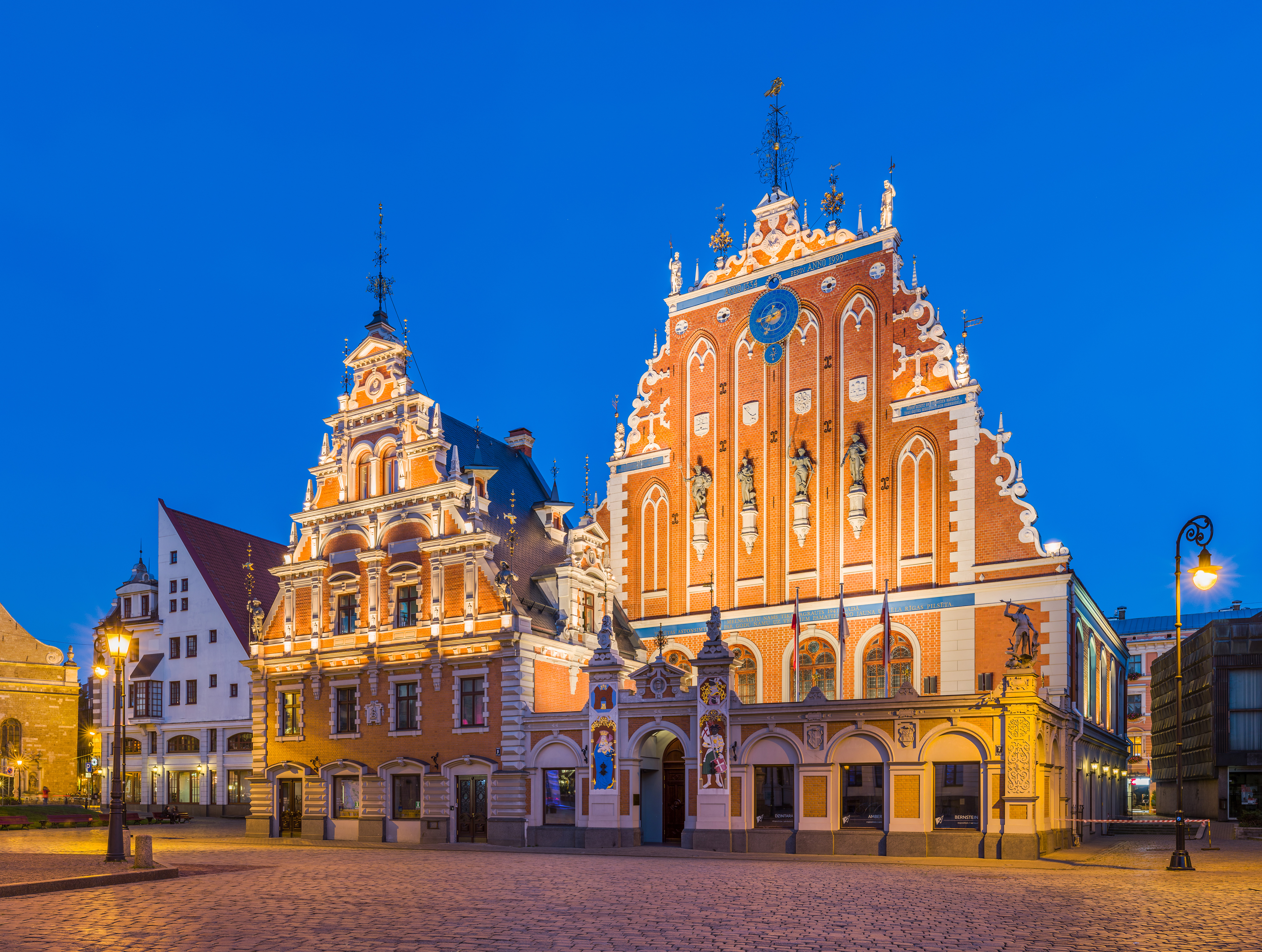
House of the Blackheads at dusk

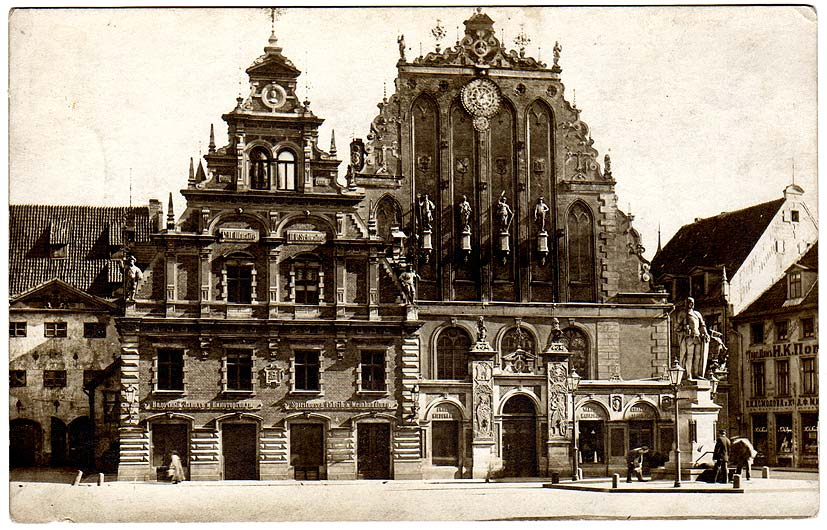
House of the Blackheads in early 20th century

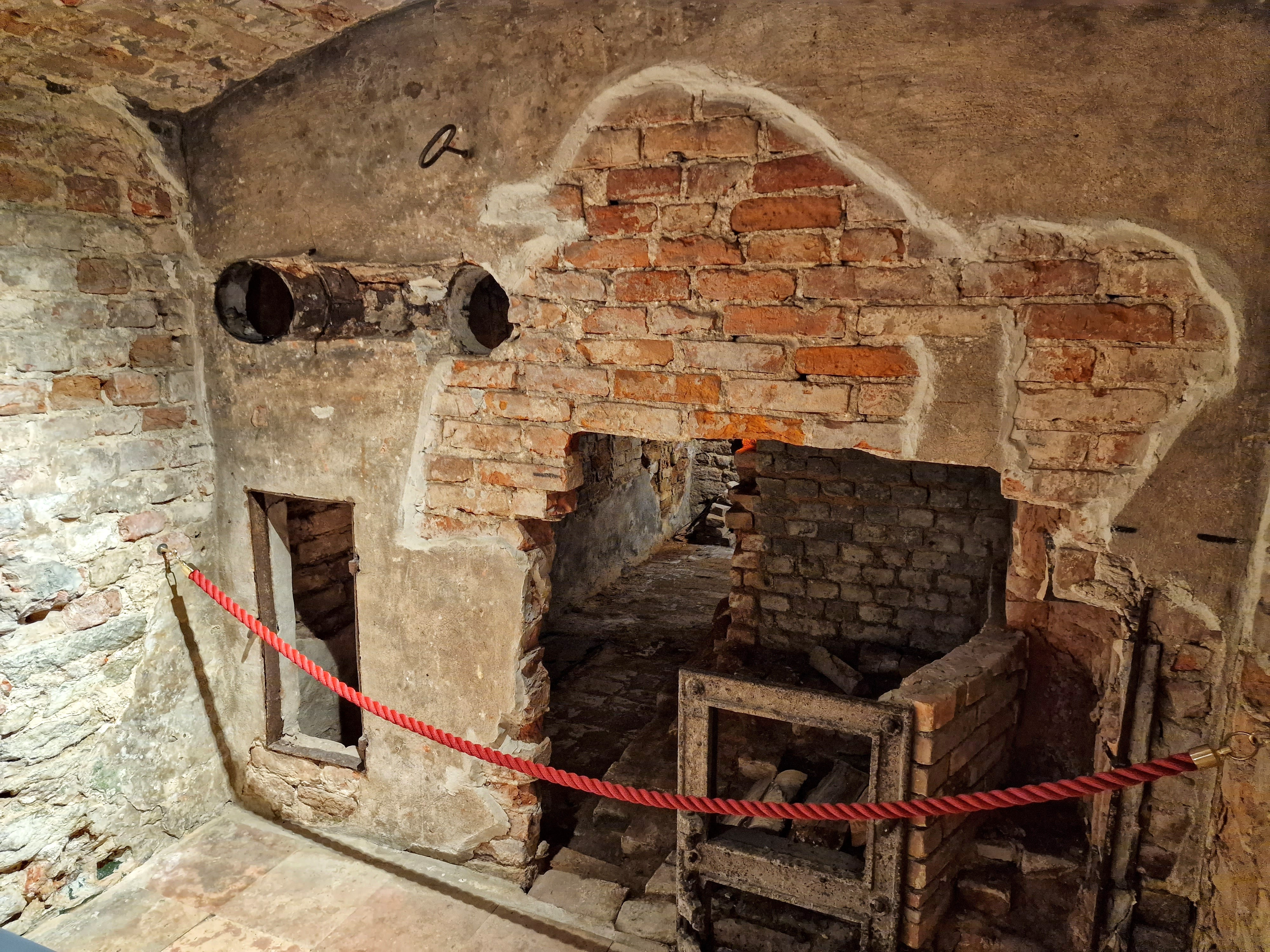
Hypocaust or warm air furnace

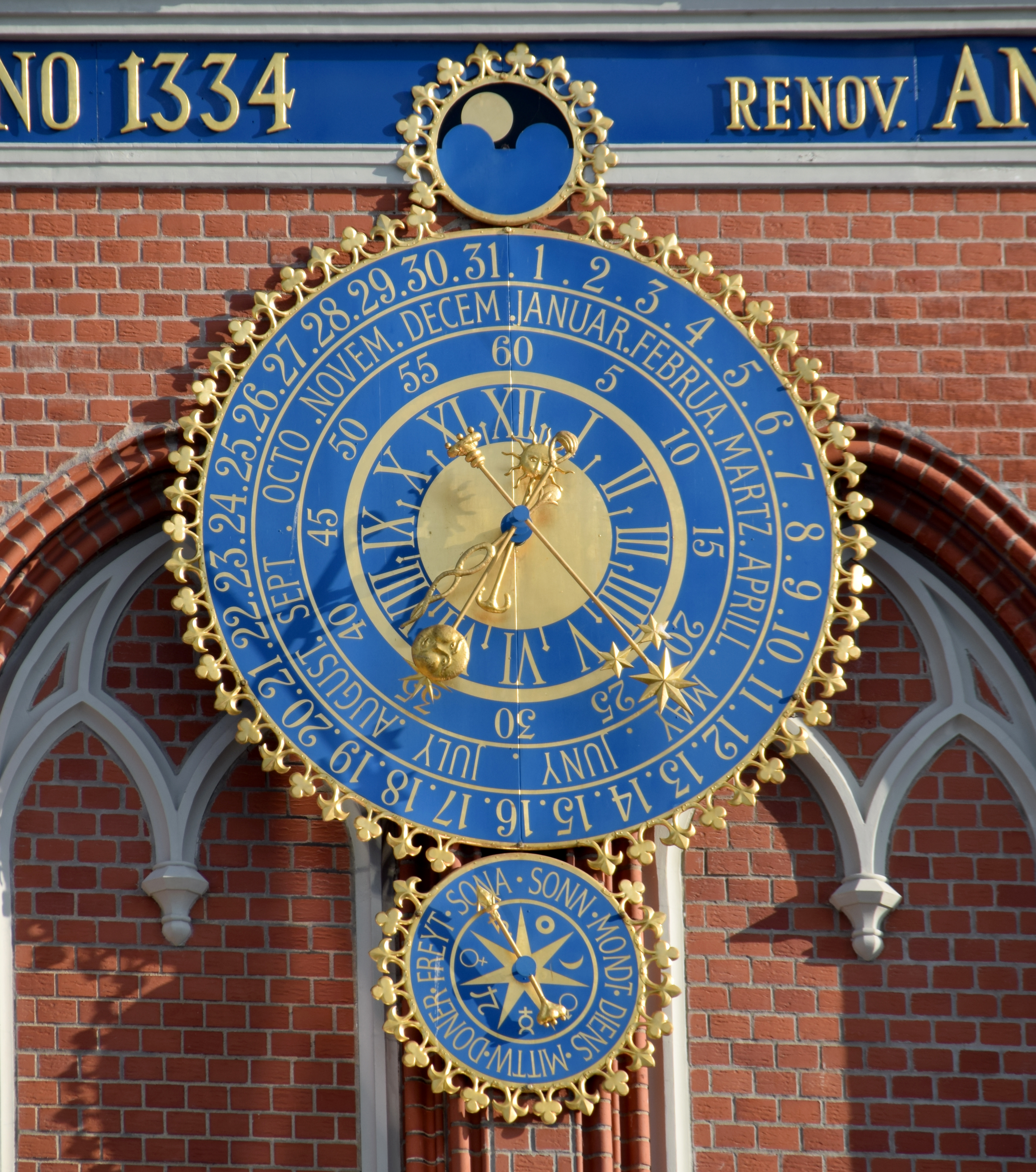
Astronomical clock at House of the Blackheads in 2022

The House of the Blackheads (Latvian: Melngalvju nams, German: Schwarzhäupterhaus) is a building situated in the old town of Riga, Latvia. The original building was erected in 1334 as a warehouse, meeting and celebration place for merchants. It was the biggest public building of Riga. From mid-15th century it was also used by Brotherhood of Blackheads, a guild for unmarried merchants, shipowners and foreigners in Riga. Major works were done in the early 17th century, adding most of the Mannerist ornamentation. In the 19th century some of the sculptures were made by the workshop of August Volz. Additionally, it is the site of the first decorated Christmas tree, which was erected in 1510.

The building and most of the old town was bombed to a ruin on 29 June 1941 in a battle between the Nazi German and Soviet armies. Notwithstanding the protests of locals and monument protection specialists, the remains were demolished by the Soviet Government on 23 May 1948. It was rebuilt between 1996 and 2000 based on studies by Edgar Puchin and Riga Polytechnic Institute from the 1980s. The funds were mainly provided by the city of Riga, and other funds were donated by people who wished to participate in the rebuilding project "I build the House of the Black Heads"; by donating 5 lats (approximately 7–11 EUR) they could place a brick in the wall. There were more than 5,000 participants. The House of the Black Heads was officially opened on 9 December 1999.

Today the House of the Blackheads is an event center and museum. In the upper level are located grand ballrooms, where historically many prestigious events were held including welcoming ceremonies for kings, queens and presidents, as well as cultural events. On first floor it is possible to visit the historic cabinets with silver collection. Cabinets were a temporary work-space for the President of Latvia, who moved the Presidential residence to the House of the Blackheads from 2012 to 2016, while the permanent location in Riga Castle was under reconstruction. The cellar is the only original part of the building which survived World War II and the Soviet Occupation. Until 1992 it was buried underground and not visible. The historic cellar is one of the few places where it is possible to walk through an authentic underground of Old Riga, where the remains, wall fragments, floor and wooden stairs, are original, and some of that is dated as far back as the 14th century. Today there are interactive exhibitions relating to commerce in Riga and the history of the Brotherhood of Blackheads.

== See also ==
- House of the Blackheads in Tallinn
