= Arent Passer =

Dutch artist

- Born: 1560; The Hague
- Died: 1637 (aged 76–77); Tallinn
- Resting place: St. Olaf's church
- Citizenship: Dutch
- Occupation: Sculptor Architect
- Known for: art of sculpture

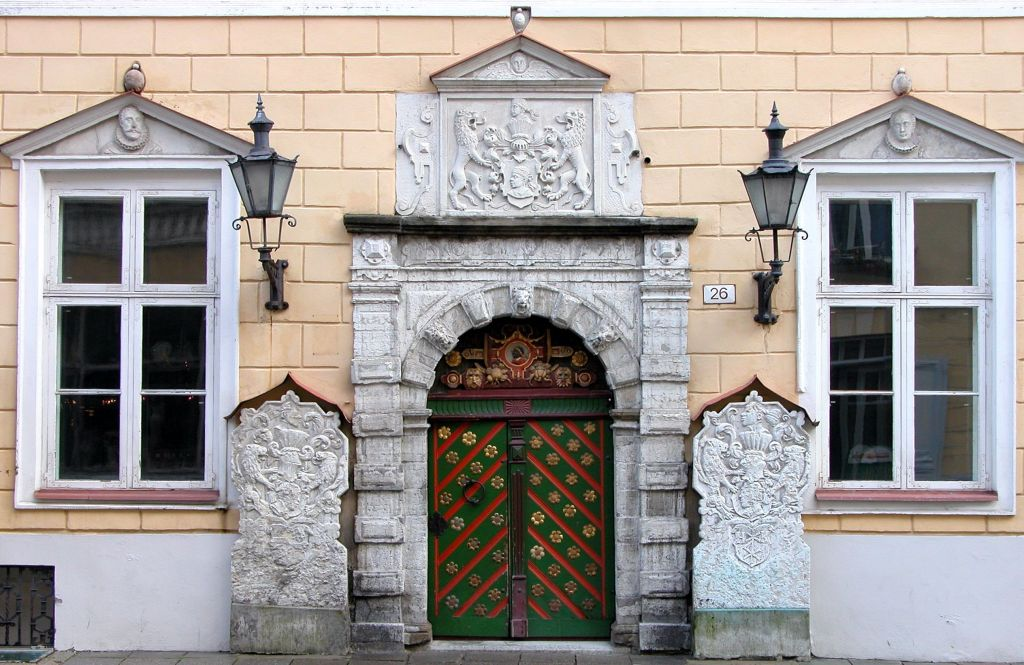
Facade of the Brotherhood of the Blackheads Guild in Tallinn

Arent Passer (c. 1560 – 1637) was a stonemason and architect of Dutch origin. He was born in The Hague and worked in Tallinn (then under Swedish control) from 1589 until his death. Arent Passer is buried in St. Olaf's church in Tallinn.

Best known artwork by Arent Passer is the tomb chest of the Swedish Commander-in Chief Pontus De La Gardie and his wife baroness Sofia Johansdotter Gyllenhielm in the Dome Church, made in 1595. Architectural solution of the facade with numerous relieves of former House of the Blackheads, made in 1597 as well as several tomb monuments in the Dome Church - Caspar von Tiesenhausen (1591); Carl Henriksson Horn af Kanckas, lord of Kankainen; Otto Yxkull (also Üexküll, Üksküla, 1601), lord of Vigala and Kiltsi; Richard Rosenkrantz (1623) and Thomas Ramm (1632).
