= History of Tallinn =

Historical affiliations

Revala (county of Ancient Estonia) pre-1219
Kingdom of Denmark 1219–1227
Livonian Brothers of the Sword 1227–1237
Livonian Order 1237–1238
Kingdom of Denmark 1238–1332
Livonian Order (protectorate) 1332–1340
Kingdom of Denmark 1340–1343
Livonian Order (protectorate) 1343–1346
Teutonic Order 1346–1347
Livonian Order 1347–1561
Kingdom of Sweden1561-1600
Duchy of Livonia (Poland–Lithuania) 1600
Kingdom of Sweden 1561–1710
Tsardom of Russia (Muscovy) 1710–1721
Russian Empire 1721–1917
Russian Republic 1917
Russian Soviet Republic 1917–1918
Republic of Estonia 1918
(German Empire) German occupation 1918
Republic of Estonia 1918–1940
(Soviet Union) Soviet occupation 1940-1941
(Nazi Germany) German occupation 1941–1944
Republic of Estonia 1944
(Estonian Soviet Socialist Republic) Soviet occupation 1944–1990
Republic of Estonia (in transition) 1990–1991
Republic of Estonia 1991–onwards

The first archaeological traces of a small hunter-fisherman community's presence in what is now Tallinn's city centre are about 5,000 years old. The comb ceramic pottery found on the site dates to about 3000 BCE and corded ware pottery around 2500 BCE.

== Medieval period ==
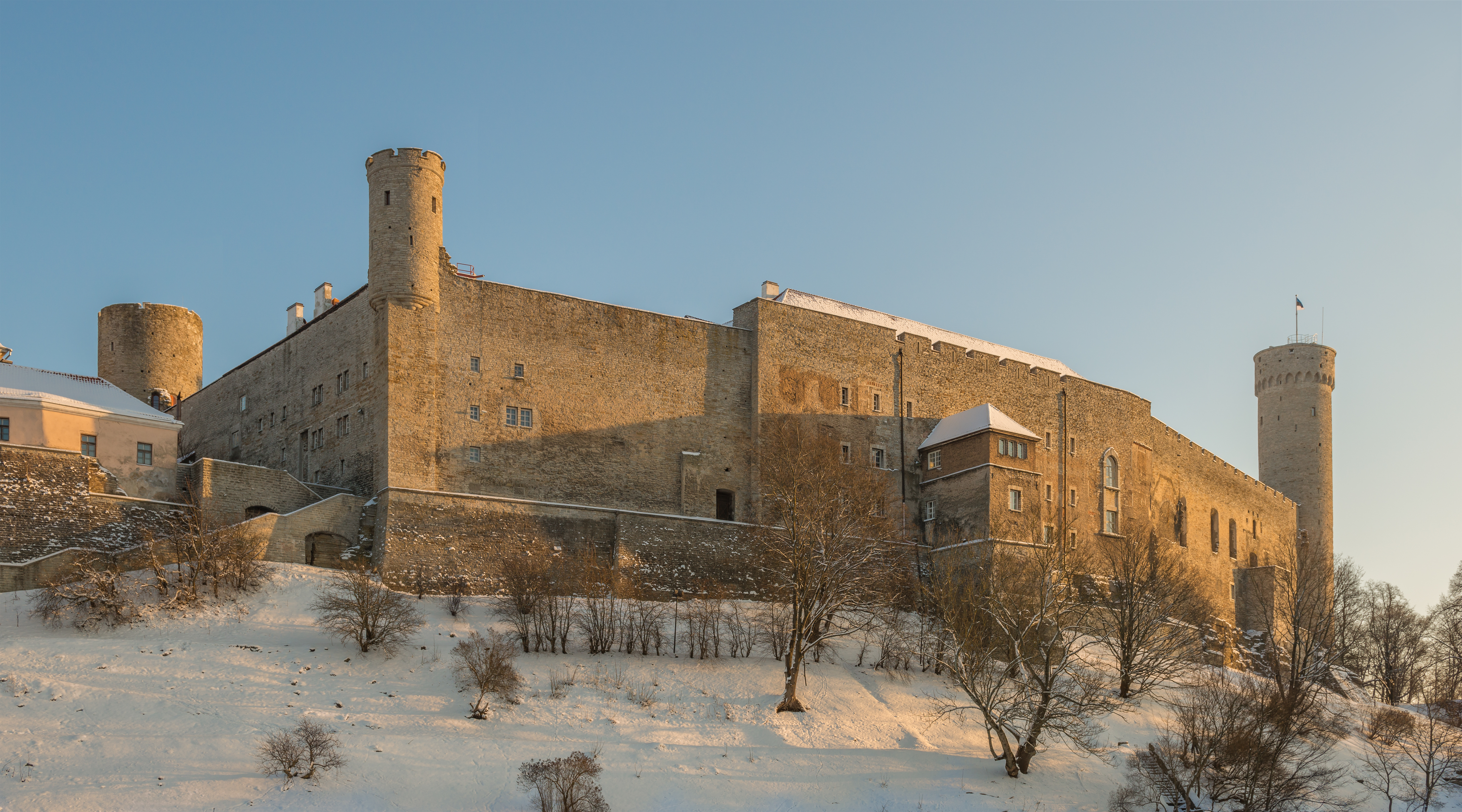
Toompea Castle (Estonian: Toompea loss)

Around 1050, the first fortress was built in Tallinn on the hill Toompea (from German: Domberg, "Cathedral Hill", "Cathedral Mountain").

As an important port for trade between Novgorod and Scandinavia, it became a target for the expansion of the Teutonic Knights and the Kingdom of Denmark during the period of Northern Crusades in the beginning of the 13th century when Christianity was forcibly imposed on the local population. Danish rule of Tallinn and northern Estonia started in 1219.

In 1285, Tallinn, then known more widely as Reval, became the northernmost member of the Hanseatic League – a mercantile and military alliance of German-dominated cities in Northern Europe. The king of Denmark sold Reval along with other land possessions in northern Estonia to the Teutonic Knights in 1346. Medieval Reval enjoyed a strategic position at the crossroads of trade between the rest of western Europe and Novgorod and Muscovy in the east. The city, with a population of about 8,000, was very well fortified with city walls and 66 defence towers.

== Modern period ==
A weather vane, the figure of an old warrior called Old Thomas, was put on top of the spire of the Tallinn Town Hall in 1530. Old Thomas has later become a popular symbol of the city.

Already in the early years of the Protestant Reformation, the city converted to Lutheranism. In 1561, Reval became a dominion of Sweden. In the following decades the city was also claimed by the Polish–Lithuanian Commonwealth as a territory incorporated per the Treaty of Vilnius in 1561, and Poland offered Sweden financial compensation for the city, which Sweden refused. The dispute over the city was one of the main reasons for the failure to form a Polish-Swedish alliance against Russia in the 1570s.

During the Great Northern War, plague-stricken Tallinn along with Swedish Estonia and Livonia capitulated to Imperial Russia in 1710, but the local self-government institutions (Magistracy of Reval and Estonian Knighthood) retained their cultural and economical autonomy within Imperial Russia as the Governorate of Estonia. The Magistracy of Reval was abolished in 1889. The 19th century brought industrialisation of the city and the port kept its importance. During the last decades of the century, russification measures became stronger. Off the coast of Reval, in June 1908, Tsar Nicholas II and Tsarina Alexandra of Russia, along with their children, met their mutual uncle and aunt, Britain's King Edward VII and Queen Alexandra, an act which was seen as a royal confirmation of the Anglo-Russian Entente of the previous year. This was also the first time a reigning British monarch had visited Russia.

== World Wars and interbellum ==
On 24 February 1918, the Estonian Declaration of Independence was proclaimed in Reval (Tallinn). It was followed by Imperial German occupation until the end of World War I in November 1918, after which Tallinn became the capital of independent Estonia. During World War II, Estonia was first occupied by the Red Army and annexed into the USSR in 1940, then occupied by Nazi Germany from 1941 to 1944. During the German occupation Tallinn suffered from many instances of aerial bombing by the Soviet air force. During the most destructive Soviet bombing raid on 9–10 March 1944, over a thousand incendiary bombs were dropped on the town, causing widespread fires, killing 757 people, and leaving over 20,000 residents of Tallinn without shelter. After the German retreat in September 1944, the city was occupied again by the Soviet Union.

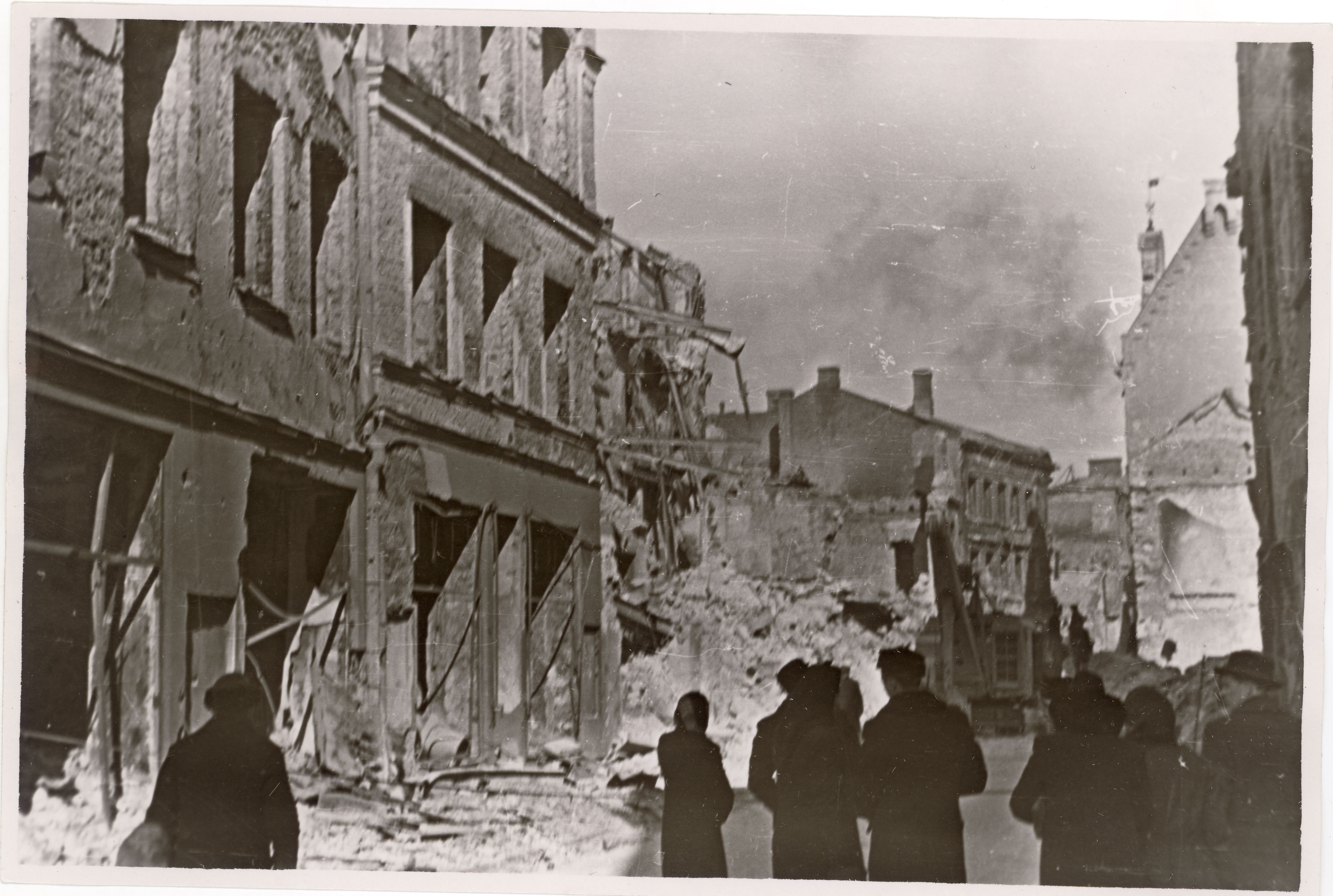
Harju Street in Tallinn old town after the Soviet aerial bombing in March 1944

During the 1980 Summer Olympics, the sailing (then known as yachting) events were held at Pirita, north-east of central Tallinn. Many buildings, such as the Tallinn TV Tower, "Olümpia" hotel, the new Main Post Office building, and the Regatta Centre, were built for the Olympics.

In 1991, the independent democratic Estonian nation was re-established and a period of quick development as a modern European capital ensued. Tallinn became the capital of a de facto independent country once again on 20 August 1991.

== Division ==
Tallinn has historically consisted of three parts:

- Toompea (Domberg), or the "Cathedral Hill", has been the seat of central authority - the bishops, Danish viceroys, then the komturs of the Teutonic Order, and Swedish and Russian governors. It was until 1877 a separate town (Dom zu Reval), with mostly aristocratic residents; today, it accommodates the seat of the Estonian parliament and government, as well as some embassies and residencies.
- All-linn, or "Old Downtown", is the old Hanseatic merchant town, which was not administratively united with Toompea until the late 19th century. It was the centre of the medieval trade on which it grew prosperous.
- The "new Estonian town", a crescent to the south of the medieval city wall, grew over time as more commoners settled in the area. Until mid-19th century censuses, ethnic Estonians had not replaced ethnic Germans as the majority among the residents within Tallinn's enlarged city boundaries.

The city of Tallinn has never been razed, but around 1524, Catholic churches in many towns of Estonia, including Tallinn, were pillaged as part of the Reformational fervor: this occurred throughout Europe. Although extensively bombed by Soviet air forces during the later stages of World War II, much of the medieval Old Town still retains its charm. The Tallinn Old Town (including Toompea) became a UNESCO World Cultural Heritage site in 1997.

== See also ==
- Timeline of Tallinn
