= Tallinn Town Hall =

Town hall in Tallinn, Estonia

Coordinates: 59°26′13.53″N 24°44′43.69″E

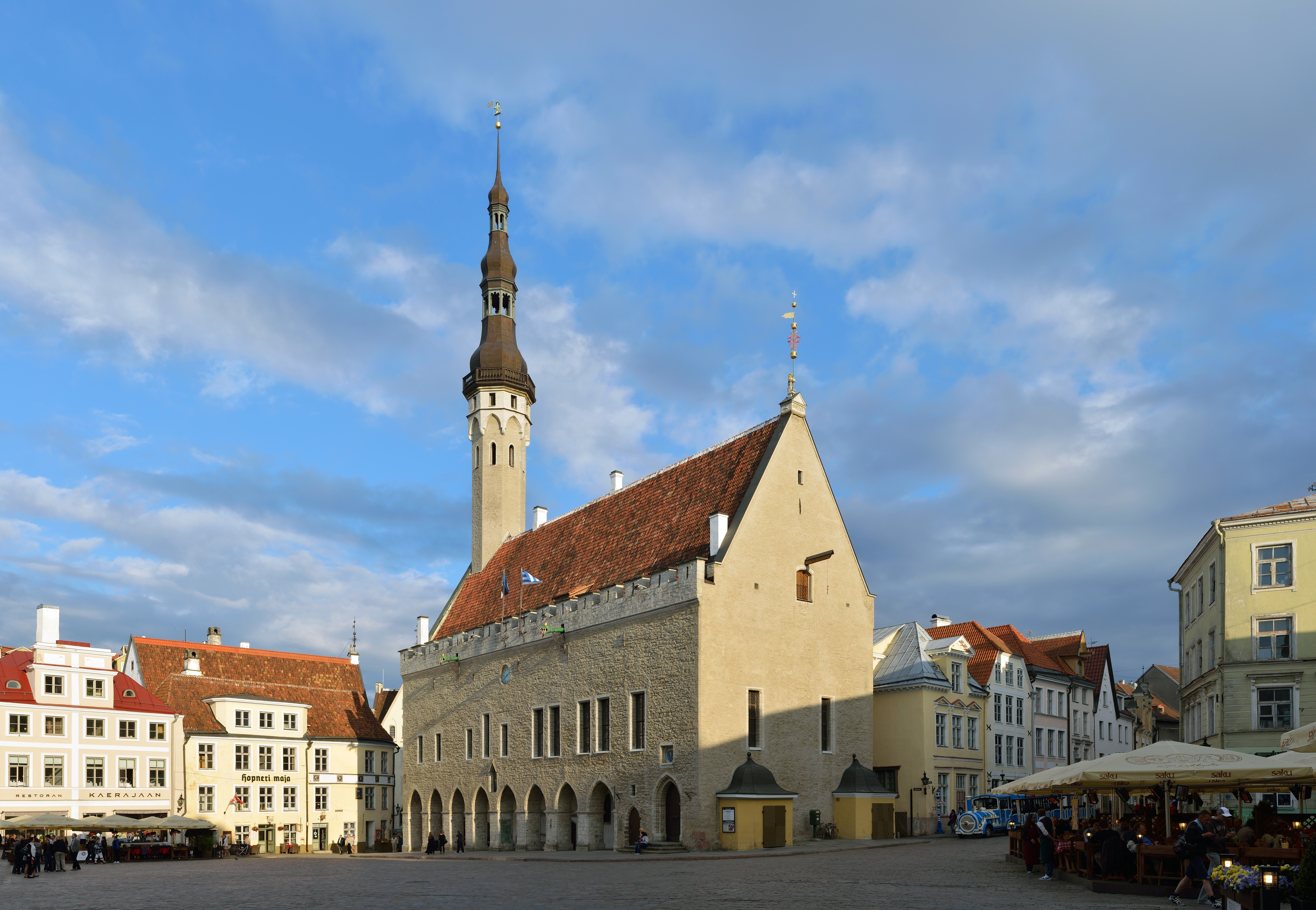
- Tallinn Town Hall

General information
- Architectural style: Gothic
- Location: Tallinn, Estonia
- Construction started: 13th century
- Completed: 1404

The Tallinn Town Hall (Estonian: Tallinna raekoda) is a building in the Old Town (Vanalinn) of Tallinn (Reval), Estonia, next to the Town Hall Square. The building is located in the south side of the medieval market square and is 36.8 metres (121 ft) long. The west wall is 14.5 metres (48 ft) in length, and the east is 15.2 metres (50 ft). It is a two-storey building with a spacious basement. It is the oldest town hall in the whole Baltic Sea region and Scandinavia.

The weather vane "Old Thomas" (Estonian: Vana Toomas) on the top of the town hall's spire, that has been there since 1530, is one of the symbols of Tallinn. The height of the tower is 64 metres. Tallinn Town Hall is located on the Town Hall Square, where the streets Kullassepa street, Dunkri street and Vanaturu kael lead. One of the shortest streets of Tallinn is Raekoja tänav, which is located behind the Town Hall.

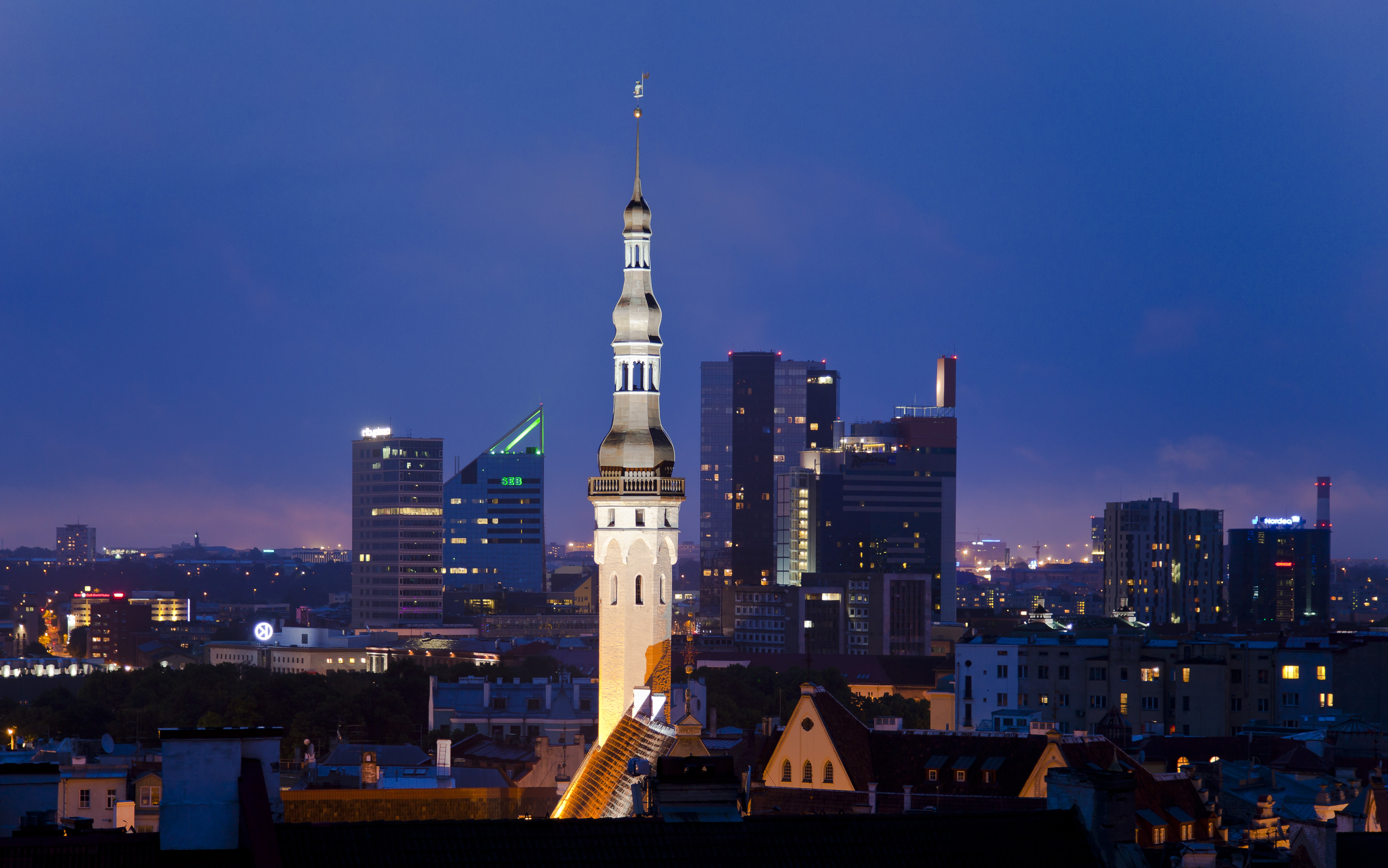
The skyscrapers of Tallinn on the background of Tallinn's town hall

The town hall was built by what was then the market square. The town hall square got its current length in the 1370s. Covered with a board roof in 1374, the town hall was probably a single-decked stone building with a basement. The attic was used as a storeroom. The façade of this long and narrow building is now a rear wall of the arcade, where some of the simple statuary framed windows from this time are still visible.

A town hall with a huge meeting room was firstly mentioned in a real estate book in 1322 as a consistorium, which had a giant warehouse (cellarium civitatis) for the time. Some walls in the eastern part of the modern town hall and seven windows in the basement and on the ground floor have remained from that time. In 1364, it was called a playhouse (teatrum) and in 1372 a town hall (Rathus).

The town council controlled the town's political, economic and even partially parlour action. The town hall was often a courthouse and a place to introduce goods; sometimes it was even used as a room for theatre, as is evident from the word teatrum. Therefore, it was very important to be placed in the heart of the town and to look representative.

Although the city administration worked in the town hall until 1970, it still holds the role of a representational building of the city administration and welcomes visitors as a concert venue and a museum where visitors can learn about the centuries-long historical and architectural value of the Tallinn Town Hall. In conjunction with the Tallinn Old Town, the town hall has been on the UNESCO world Heritage Sites list since 1997. In 2004, the Tallinn Town Hall celebrated its 600th birthday.

In 2005, the Tallinn Town Hall received a high recognition – second prize in the category of conservation of Architectural Heritage for the revival of the last surviving Gothic Town Hall in Northern Europe and the exemplary revealing of all the historical layers of this icon of the great European tradition of municipal power. The prize was presented to Elvira Liiver Holmström, the director of Tallinn Town Hall by Queen Sofía of Spain at the European Heritage Awards Ceremony which was held on 27 June 2006 at the Palacio Real de El Pardo, Madrid. Europa Nostra medal was presented to Tallinn Town Hall at the ceremony on 15 September 2006 by Siim Kallas, Vice President of the European Commission, and Thomas Willoch, Europa Nostra board member.

In the 1870s, when the Town Hall was going through a renovation, the workers found behind a cabin, 14 woodboxes of old documents. They had not been opened for several centuries. The oldest document was from 1248. The 300 documents span from period 1200–1700 and are written in Latin, two kind of German languages and Swedish. The documents are about Tallinn's, then called Reval, history as well in general the history of the East-Sea Provinces. The documents was sorted by an appointed Commission by philologists Christian Eduard Pabst, Rutzwurm and Gotthard von Hansen in six categories: the Danish King's Privileges for Reval, letters to a council Selhorst in Reval, and historic documents about the Swedish Town Visby.

== Architecture ==
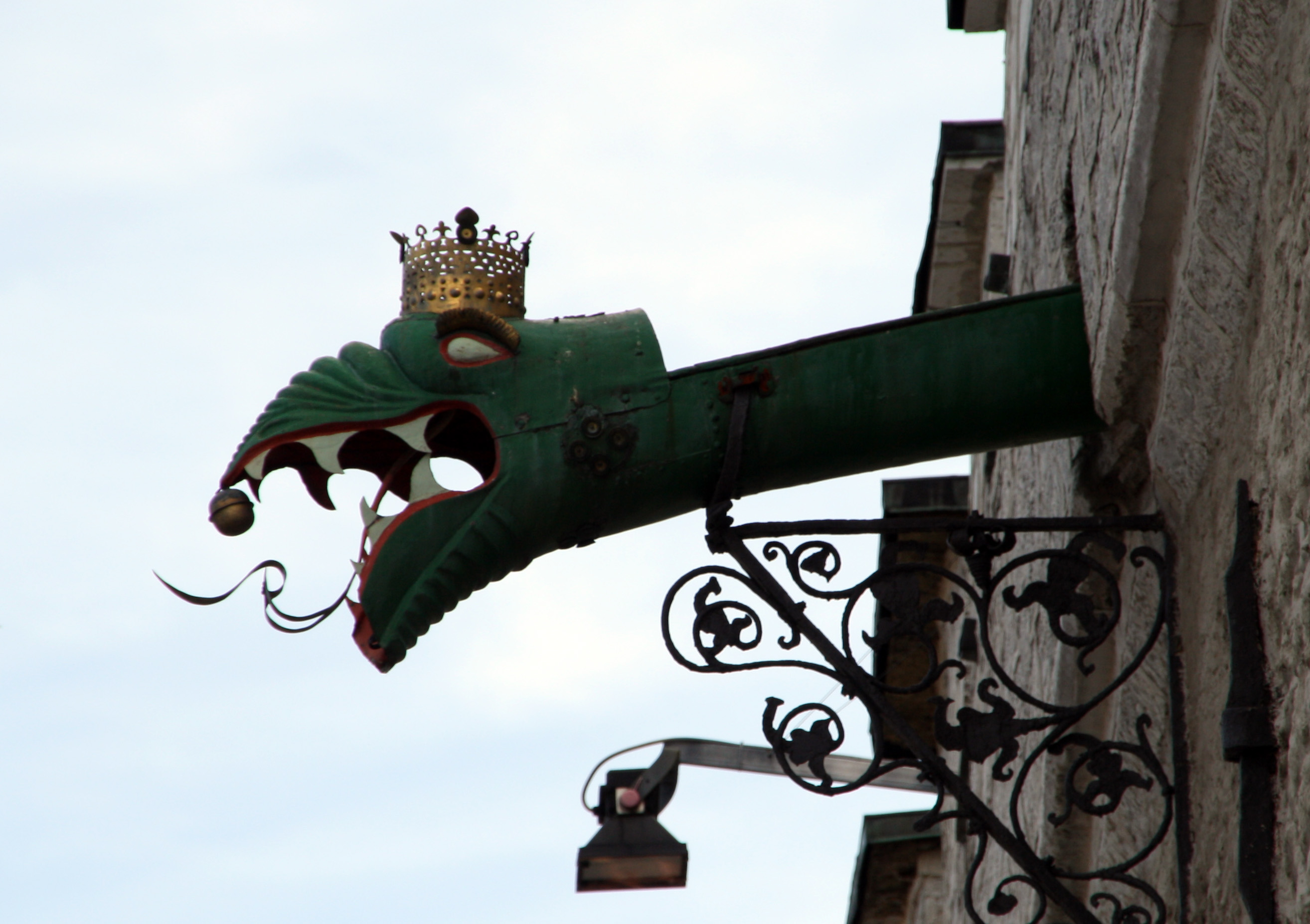
One of the gargoyles of the Tallinn town hall

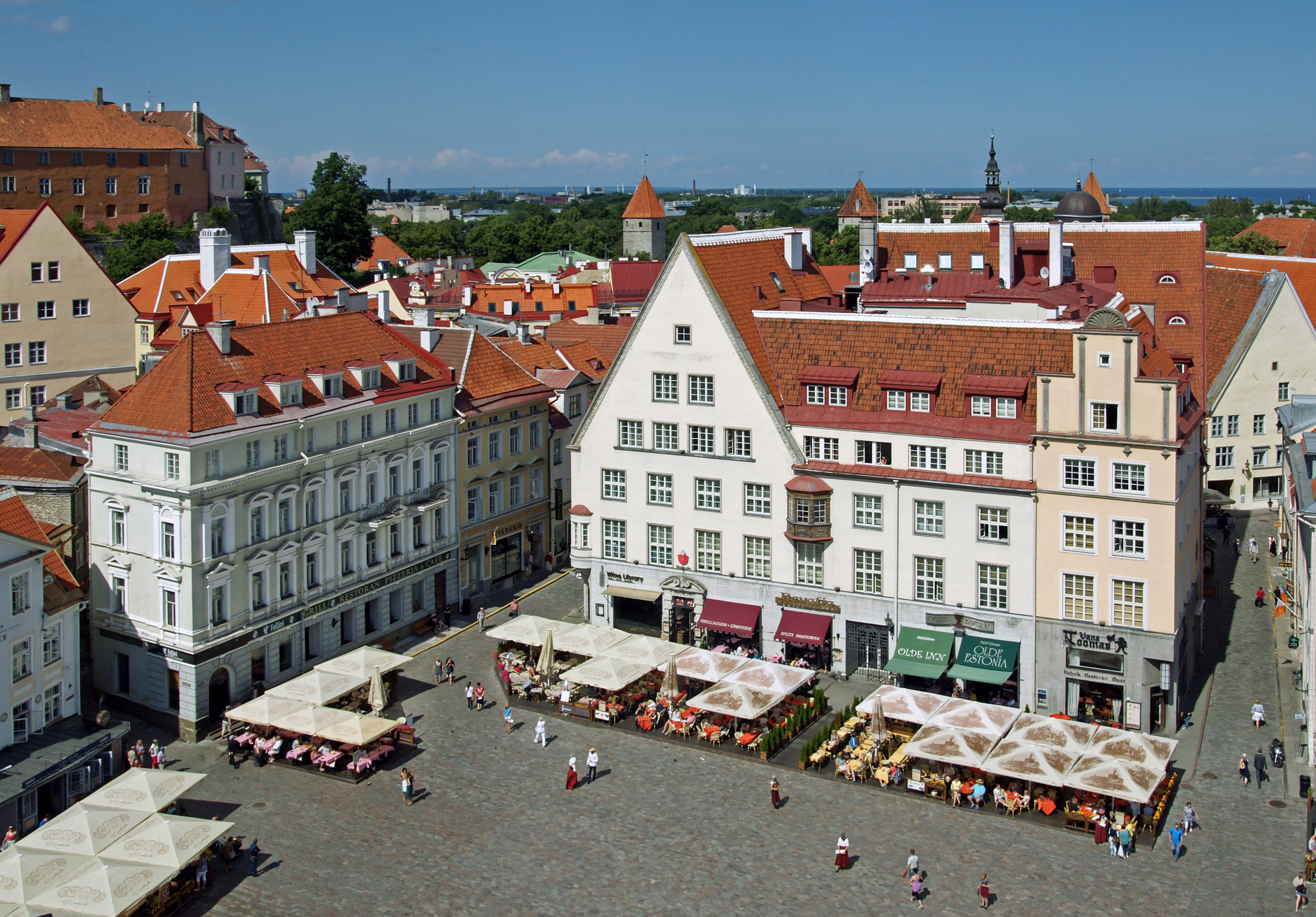
Town Hall Square seen from the town hall tower.

The town hall was initially a building where urban citizens held meetings. It was later used as a government building, a court and a place to introduce new goods. The building process of representational town halls started in the 12th century. Usually they were built in the centre of the town, near the market square. The Town Hall of Lübeck (13th–14th century), the Venetian Doge's Palace (started in the first half of the 14th century), the Town Hall of Narva, Estonia (built at the end of the 17th century, restored in 1963), and, of course, Tallinn's Town Hall are the most famous.

The town hall is built out of grey limestone and the roof out of clay roof tiles. The town hall is much older than it looks and its current appearance shows. The old walls hiding behind later constructions tell a story about the multi-stage construction of the town hall. According to newest studies, the multi-stage expansion of the town hall took place in five different periods from the west to the east. Therefore, the layout of the town hall is crooked and curved and up to half a metre narrow, which makes it look like a trapezium. In the first quarter of the 14th century the existing building was extended and the basement rooms were expanded. A sort of diele-dornse (vestibule and a rear) spatial system of distribution emerged. According to the results of field studies, it can be said that the oldest town hall building covered the current town hall's western part and the south wall of the current arcade faced the market square.

In 1346, the king of Denmark ceded the power in Estonia to the Teutonic Order. As a Hanseatic city, Tallinn gained the right to control the eastern trade having the so-called right as a stockpile area. The fast growth of trading and prosperity determined the need for new rooms and a presentable appearance for the town hall.

The oldest, eastern part of the building was extended from 1371 to 1374 towards the west. This building with the current length did not differ much from a big citizen's house. The building got its exterior in 1402–04, with the rebuilding led by stonemason Ghercke, which has been preserved in the key features to the present day. The building was built with two storeys.

A salient octahedral tower, which is mostly built into the building and leans on the wall, rises from the building's eastern gable. It was built in 1627–28 by G. Graff. It has a three-piece baroque spire with open galleries. The tower is 64 metres high. The spire was built in 1627, but obtained its final shape in 1781 and was also reconstructed in this shape in 1952 after its destruction during World War II (architect A. Kukkur). The spire is in Late Renaissance style.

Decorative details are a crenelated battlement that acts as a stronghold, the "Old Thomas" (Vana Toomas) on top of the tower (the copy of the original from 1530 is in the Tallinn City Museum (Linnamuuseum)), vane with three eggs, that are held by the simple rock lion and gargoyles decorated with the heads of dragons on the western gable. The Old Thomas is wearing the clothing of a 16th-century city guard. He can be named the symbol of Tallinn and there are even poems dedicated to him. The Old Thomas is holding a flag that has 1996 written on it.

An open arcade gear is on the building's square's long side, which is almost on the whole façade's ground floor scope (archway). Cellar entrances and windows unfold here. The initial portal was placed on the façade's western side. The current main entrance was built later, supposedly in the 18th century. The door next to the former portal is subsequent. Low annexes on the western side of the building were established at the end of the 18th century. The main façade's windows were also repeatedly changed; in the 18th century they were quadrangular. The rooms on the western side of the cellar are covered with edgeline vaults that are carried by the strong quadrangular pillars. Part of the cellar's partitions were probably built later. A strong wall separates the western side of the cellar from the noticeably lower building in the east. An open arcade gear is on the square side of the building. The current main entrance with a stairway was built in the 18th century. Low annexes on the western side of the building were built at the end of the same century. During the Middle Ages, a trade hall and a torture chamber and wine cellar were located on the first floor. In the Middle Ages, there was a court on the second floor and in addition a coffer, a room for keeping accounts, representative hall for citizens, town hall parlour (raesaal) and town hall kitchen (raeköök).

The massive façade supporting on the open sharp arcade gear is split into groups by narrow quadrangular windows, which are a bit bigger than those of regular houses. These groups of windows mark the three most important offices and representational spaces of the main floor, starting from the tower: the town hall writer's room (kämmerei); the single-nave town hall room, which was the hall meetings room for the town hall lords; and a two-nave citizens' hall. From the tin squared windows, town hall lords could see several houses under the town hall: weighing house, pharmacy, coin mint and a jail. At the end of the façade is a parapet reminding of the upper part of a fortress wall with decorative loop-holes. The shape of the tower following directly the example of the Church of the Holy Ghost and a rear parapet on the façade's cornice line refer to the indirect contacts with the sub-Rhineland building art.

The main façade is decorated by a defensive parapet and dragon head-shaped gargoyles. It is pervaded by an arcade, which consists of nine arcs and is the length of almost the whole building. In addition, the façade is supported by eight pillars. It was comfortable for merchants to shelter under the arcade in case of rain. One of the pillars of the arcade-gear of the town hall was used as a pillory. Criminals were chained to it to display them to the townspeople, so that they could dishonor and mock them. It had a neck rail and manacles. The arcade ends with the town hall's main entrance in the right side. The main door differs from other smaller doors and hatches with beautiful statuary jambs and three stairs that lead to the door. Because of them it is visible that that is the main entrance.

The fiber of the first floor's western side is similar to the cellar under it – its edgeline vault is carried by four low tetrahedral pillars. In the Middle Ages there was supposedly a so-called trade hall here where new goods were introduced and bargains were made. The room on the eastern side from the trade hall, whose vaults lean on identical tetrahedral pillars, was a torture chamber in the Middle Ages. The room was connected by the staircases built in the northern wall, with the parlour of the Town Hall on the second floor where a court was located. From the two eastern rooms, the one in the south was a coffer, from which there was access to the second floor in the accounting room (kämmerei) by the staircases located in the city wall. As a treasury, the room located in the north is also covered with a barrel vault. This room's city wall held an oven (kalorifeer) before, to heat the parlour with warm air.

The most interesting rooms of the main storey are a festive citizen's hall with six vaults and the town hall parlour in the east. The so-called citizens' hall on the second floor in the west, which is 16.2 metres long and 12 metres wide, is a 7.5 metre-high room with two vaults. The room is supported by two octahedral pillars typical to the 16th-century architecture. The room is covered by a low octahedral groin vault, which is allocated by a three-piece belt arc (vööndkaar). In the southeast corner of the town hall is a shaft, which pervades all of the floors, used to be a lavatory (profatt)

== Citizens' Hall ==
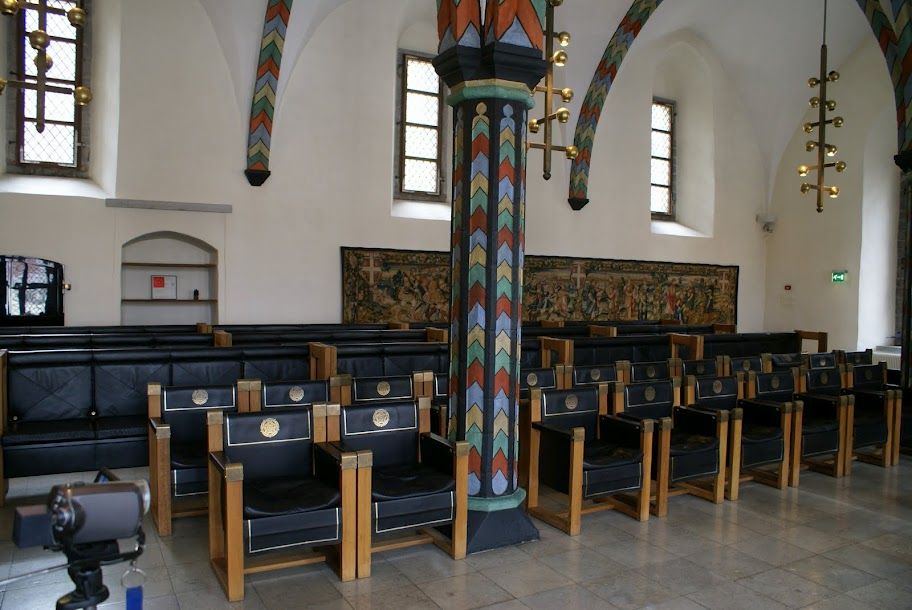
The Citizens' Hall in 2012

The big hall in the town hall is called the Citizens' Hall. The Citizens' Hall can hold 100 people and also has a piano that can be used for musical performances. As an unheated representational hall, important guests, vagabond musicians, actors were welcomed here and rich feasts were held. The citizens' hall's look is shaped by two-coloured herringbone patterned octahedral pillars, on which impost is architectural motive of consoles, that originates from the Cistercian architecture and often appears later in Tallinn's architecture. The arched ceiling supports on them. Arched ceilings were rarely seen elsewhere than in churches, monasteries and fortresses. In dwelling houses were usually built wooden ceilings.

Nine windows make the room very light, the slender Cistercian-influenced pillars on which the arched ceiling supports, add more wideness to the room. The two-vaulted room is separated with seven consoles into six bays of vault. In the Middle Ages, the floor was laid with special-sized limestone slabs; nowadays they are uniform.

Consoles and pillars are covered with a three-coloured herringbone pattern. They were restored on the example of the westward remained pillar fragment. At completion, the Citizens' Hall was supposedly not as spacious as it is now. Visually the room was straightened by the paintings of grapevines, that probably covered the walls and the ceiling. There are two small medieval lavatories (profatt) in the eastern corner of the southern wall, one for men and the other one for women. The portal that goes through the eastern wall, separates the room with the town hall parlour (Estonian: raesaal). Above the portal is a niche whose initial content is unknown. Since 1561 an admonition plaque in Latin for aldermen has stood in the niche. On the walls of the Citizens' Hall are tapestries which were ordered from Enghien, the Netherlands, and which depict scenes from King Solomon's life.

== Parlour ==
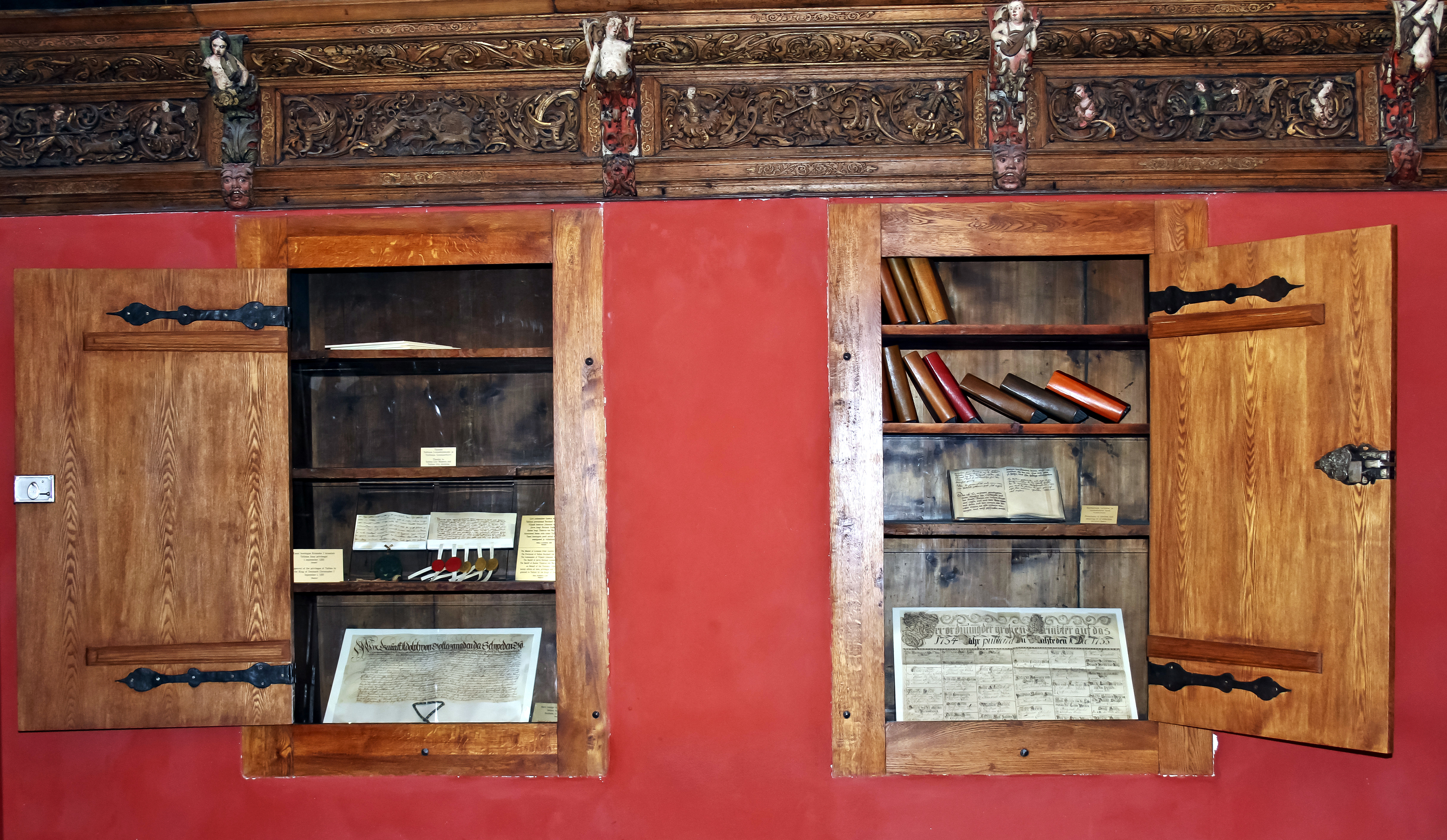
The closets on the first floor in the Town Hall

The profile of the arc, consisting of two strong sharp-clear edge toruses, is repeated variably also in the two-vaulted parlour of the town hall that is behind the citizens' hall. Low-relief keystones in the vaulted ceiling in the parlour are one of the first examples of the low embossing style that is representative of the local late Gothic period. The parlour (raesaal) is the most important room of the town hall. The aldermen held meetings and carried the votes there. One of the conveniences of the parlour was that it was heated. In the Middle Ages, not all the rooms had a fireplace or some other heating that could provide warmth in the winter, but the aldermen could not serve their duties in cold rooms. The cocklestove, standing in the corner, appeared several centuries later.

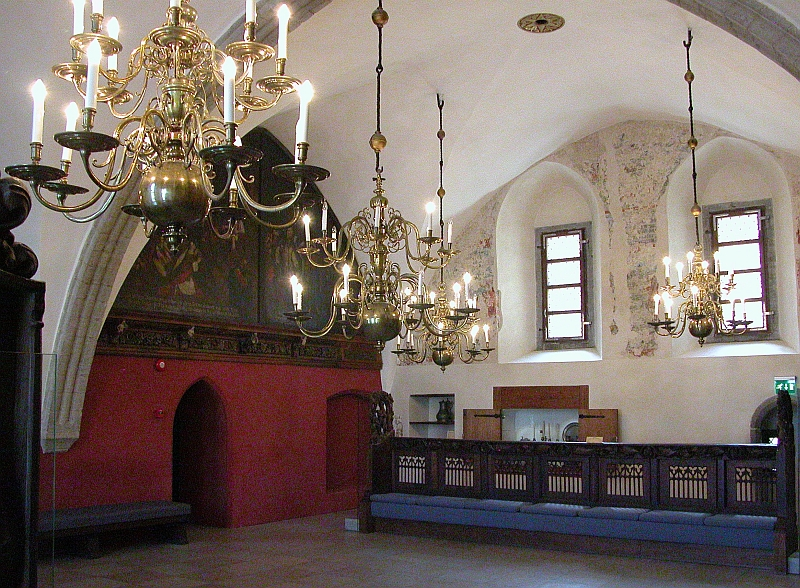
Parlour of the Tallinn Town Hall in 2009

Two money closets were immured in the walls of the parlour. The closets' oak doors (oak is a very durable tree) have tinned iron hinges. These doors could have been locked because documents, money and other valuables were kept there. The town council had a town clerk position, whose task was to mark important things in documents and who, besides having beautiful handwriting, also had a good education. The accounting room, called kämmerei can be called the Ministry of Finance. An account of all the town's income and expenses was kept there. The treasury could be accessed only through the kämmerei. Treasured pewter, silverware, and other large-dimension treasures that did not fit in the closets of the parlour were stored there.

== Other rooms ==
The basement and the ground floors rooms (wine cellar and trade hall) are covered by simple circular groin vaults, which support on the tetrahedral pillars. The building was restored from 1971 to 1975 (T. Böckler, L. Pärtelpoeg, U. Umberg).

== Architectural self-awareness ==
The architectural model of the Tallinn Town Hall is not directly taken from somewhere else. It gained its shape on the basis of local long-term processing experience, architectural tradition and the masters' job skills. Some external influences obtained a unique interpretation in Tallinn, shaping the forms of architecture in their own ways and making it unparalleled.

The masters of Tallinn had to know the public buildings of Italy, which the arcade gear shows. Tallinn Town Hall architecture is not based on the German town halls in any way. In the façade, premises, details and conjointly in the whole schedule of the Town Hall, aspects of the merchants' representative house, the strictly-formed fortress, and also the halls and churches' sublimity are all intertwined with each other and reflected there.

In the compact corpus of the building, which architectural character's final determinants are constructive monumental forms, that were chosen with simplicity, have numerously found their places as another types of rooms with different functions besides the big halls. As the oldest European town hall and Tallinn's first big building of secular architecture, it impersonates the wealth and self-awareness of a Hanseatic town.

== Construction history ==
Studies of the construction have proved that the town hall was located at the same place in the 13th century. The 600-year-old building was built upon the old town hall's brickwork. A stone building was there in 1250. A building with a meeting room (consistorium) and a basement (cellarium civitatis) is mentioned in 1322. As the town grew richer and more powerful, it was rebuilt. At the end of the 14th century, the building was as tall as it is now, but it was narrow and without the tower. Only the arcade-gear, which differed from the current one, referred to the fact that it was not an ordinary dwelling house.

By the 14th century, Tallinn (old name: Reval) developed into one of the most important intermediate ports of the Hanseatic trade road between Europe and Russia. The 15th century was the heyday of the Hanseatic city Tallinn, when the city was largely rebuilt thanks to the profits from trade. The central article that made its way from Europe through Tallinn to Russia, was salt. Salt was followed by fabrics and herring. Metals, wine and spices were also important. Although some of the things mentioned stayed at the local market, most of it went on to Russia. Crops were the most important from the goods taken from Tallinn to the west. Rye, wood, flax and limestone were from Livonia. Most building monuments that have remained to this day, come from the 15th century: Middle Age merchant houses, churches, guild halls and including the town hall.

The major work began at the beginning of the 15th century. The town council celebrated Easter of 1402 in the old building. The construction started right after the holidays. The leading master of the building was probably stonemason Ghercke. It is possible that the leading masters, including Ghercke, came from downtown Toompea, where extensive works had ended in the last quarter of the 14th century in the fortress, the circular wall of Great Toompea and in the cathedral (toomkirik). 600 logs, 581 balks, 46 pairs of girders and 107 burdens of stone were brought to the construction site. The stones were brought from Lasnamäe, where a stonemasons village was located. The names of the carriers have been documented. Crude stones were brought for the bricklaying, but some of the details had to be made of cut stone. The main construction – foundations, walls and vaults – was built out of limestone brought from the limestone plateau, limestone brought from stone pits near the city and all put together using lime mortar. In 1403, the stones were cut and an arcade, pillars supporting the vaults, window jambs, etc. were built. The pillars of the arcade and the main portal in the western section that had an important role in the development of the building style of Tallinn, were built by Ghercke himself and his helpers. The smaller southern portal of the cathedral (Tallinna Toomkirik) was used as an example. It is known that the stonemason Yckmele built the pillars for the wine cellar and 200 blocks for the outer corners of the building. The windows were built by master Keyzner, one of the large family of stonemasons. Master Ghercke and his two helpers were paid five Rigan marks (one Rigan mark weighed 207.8 g of silver).

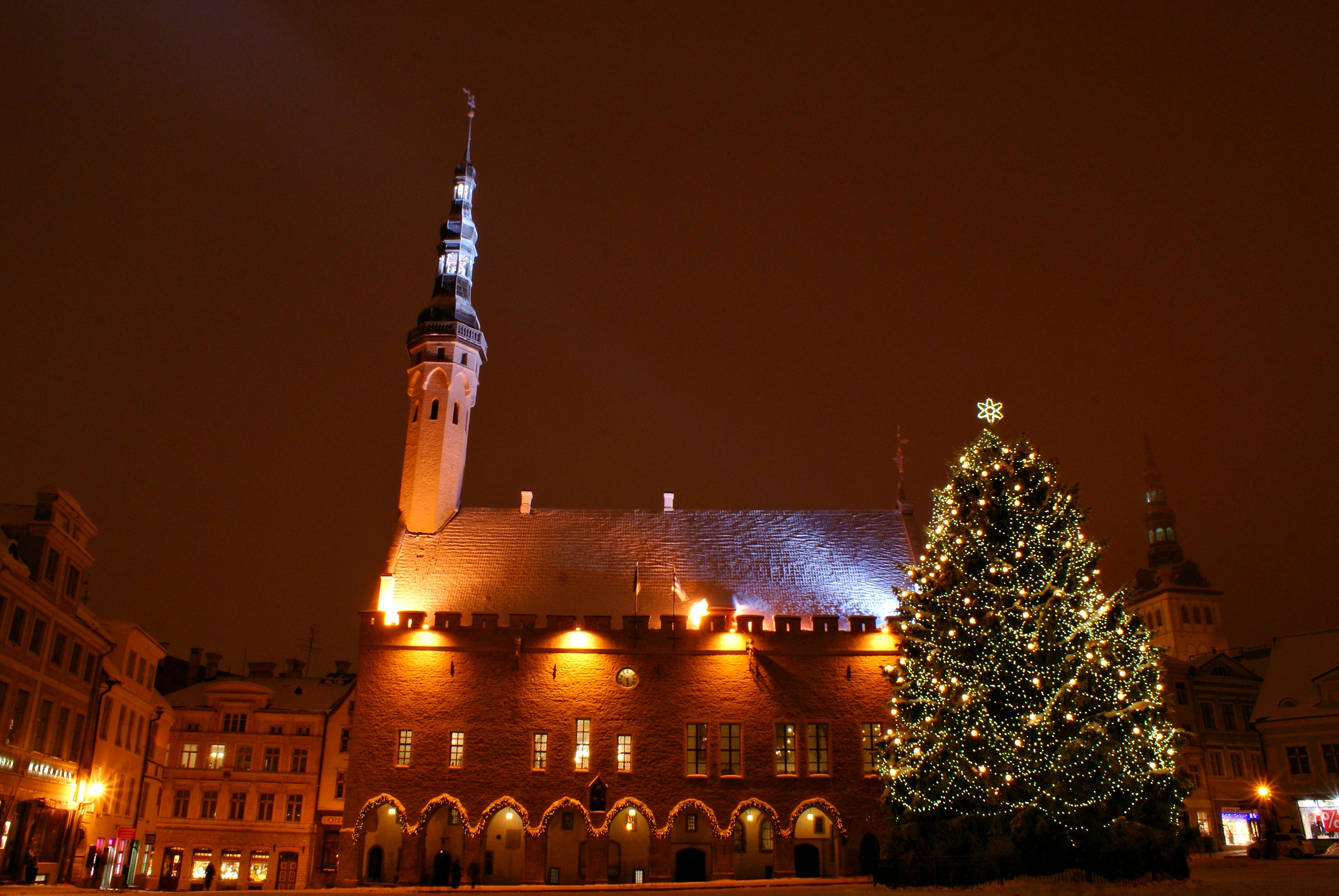
Tallinn Town Hall during the Christmas

The construction work was finished at the end of 1404. The masters who had placed the tiles, glazed the windows and cleaned up the debris, got their salaries. The town council celebrated Christmas in a new building. The construction had lasted for two and a half years. The builders worked only in summer. A white lime coating covered the walls and left clean stone-constructions, that were made glossy, for many centuries.

The construction works continued later: the roof and a tower were repaired, the windowpanes and staircases were changed and the ovens were set. The Golden Age of the historical Tallinn was a period from the middle of the 15th century to the beginning of the 16th century. The economical prosperity of the Hanseatic times made architecture and artistic creations possible. The vane Old Thomas was established above the town hall in 1530 (the current vane is its exact copy; the initial vane is in the town hall's basement and the vane from 1996 is in the city museum (Linnamuuseum)). Heinrich Hartmann, who was from a well-known molder family, prepared a bell for the town hall at the end of the 16th century. In the 17th century the town hall got a new spire that was made by master builder Greiger Graff.

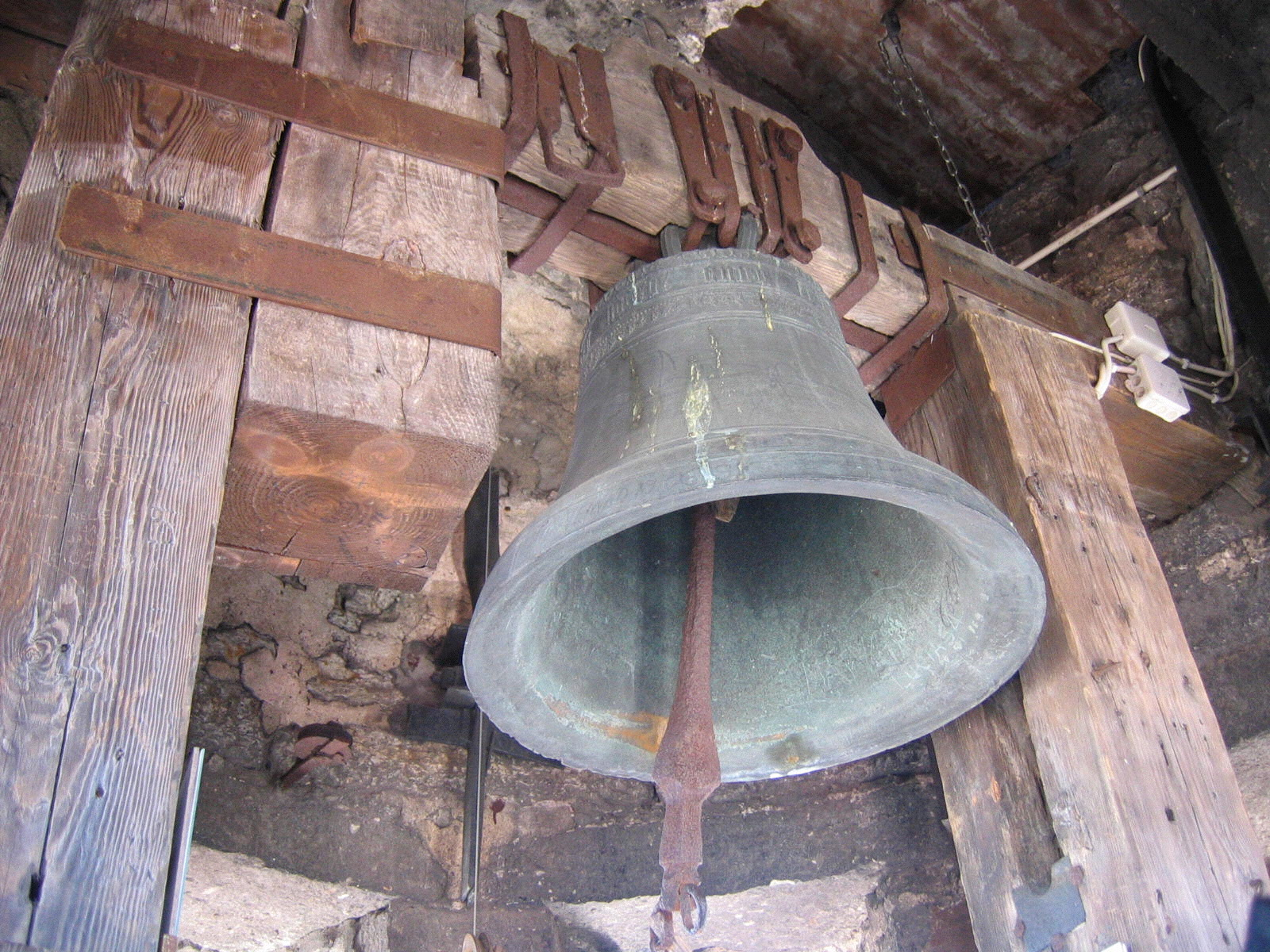
Tallinn Town Hall's bell

The sharp Gothic spire was replaced with a current spire in a Late Renaissance style in 1627–1629. "It can be said by the bricks with one sign, that several of the façade works, the repairs of the tower’s console and gable, the installation of new decorative gargoyles and the works of the interior, were done in the same time or at least solidly," architect Teddy Böckler said. "Apparently, the partitions were built in the grand hall between the pillars and the bulkhead at the height of the consoles, between the years 1630 and 1650. The fireplaces were built to heat these small rooms. Formerly, there were no rain deflectors that would reach the ground. The dragon-headed gargoyles from stone or iron were on the eaves instead of these. They had to lead the water away from the building. The coppersmith Daniel Pöppel hammered dragon-headed gargoyles from the copper-plates simultaneously with finishing the tower. Now they are in the town hall because of their beauty.

In 1652–1652, the main entrance of the town hall was rebuilt and transferred to the central part of the building, which is characteristic of Baroque architecture. The main portal was closed. The arcade and the windows of the basement and the first floor, which revealed the originality and representation of the town hall, were walled up. The citizens' hall was divided into two floors and was divided into separate rooms. In 1860, the quadrangular windows were built ogival.

In 1944 during the bombing of Tallinn in World War II, the spire of the town hall caught fire and was destroyed. This was the impetus for the post-war renovation. The restorations were extensive. The tower was restored in 1952. In 1959–1960, the arcade was opened again and the traces of reconstructions from the previous century were removed. In 1971–1975 (architect Teddy Böckler, interior decorators Leila Pärtelpoeg and Udo Umberg), the walls and ceilings that had been built later were demolished and the town hall was constructed into a representative institution of Tallinn.

The tower's wooden structure that had been restored in 1952, had partly rotted by 1996 and the tin cladding had disintegrated. So, the spire and the Old Thomas with a symbolic meaning were both replaced. Old Thomas could have fallen down in case of a bigger storm. The works began in the beginning of 1996, when the needed details were prepared in Albu parish. The parts of the tower were transported to Tallinn in June – the assembly and covering with copper tiles had already begun. It took 1.4 tonnes of copper plates to cover the wooden structure of the tower. In the last week of work on Wednesday, the tower's parts were put together and initially, the Old Thomas was placed on the tower next to the town hall tower. The old tower had to be strengthened so that it would not decay during the work. The upper part was raised at 8:45 a.m. Initially the work was planned to be finished at 3:00 p.m but was delayed until night. The wind rose and when only the last part of the tower was left to be raised, there was a risk that the wind would disturb the work. Finally, at 7:00 p.m., the last part of the tower was taken to its place. The tower's construction and placement were worked out by the project office Sille, engineer Danil. Plans were carried out by AS Stinger, led by Voldemar Metsaallik. The spire was put up with the help of Pekkaniska aerial platform.

During the restorations in 1970, one huge medieval hall was restored. It had been rebuilt as smaller chambers for over 300 years. The ovens' two foot chimneys that were built to heat the chambers were demolished from the hall to the vaulted ceiling. The hole in the vaulted ceiling that was hacked there in the 17th century was covered with a plastered wooden base hanging on the ropes.

In 1996, the Old Thomas might have lost his sword when the old tower was lifted down. The Old Thomas' fastenings were almost completely unfixed and the water dripped from the tower sphere underneath the vane. Apparently, the sword could have fallen down with a storm on the town hall's roof or ended up in the house of a souvenir collector. In Tõnu Lauk's opinion, the Old Thomas decayed quickly because in 1952, the statue was left unpainted. In addition, nothing was done to prevent the rusting of fixing details. In addition, the wooden structure was built improperly. Water flowed in and the tower rotted quickly. During the construction of the new tower and a vane, these mistakes were kept in mind. Old Thomas was primed with red tin, painted and partly gilded. The light-green vane is allegedly exactly the same as the original. Old Thomas' face, neck, feet, sword, flag and the tower sphere on which the statue stands are golden. It took about four grams of golden plates for all of this. The change occurred in 1992 from architect Böckler from AS Vana Tallinn. He stated that complete gilding was not common before. The first Old Thomas from the year 1530 was also partly gilded. The original of Old Thomas and the dragon-head-shaped gargoyles that are also partly gilded confirm that saying.

The spire had lost its initial shape until that time because of the many restoration projects over the years. The current tower is more like the Niguliste church. It is more slim so that there is no room to move in the external balcony. The current spire is more characteristic of the 17th century Late Renaissance period. Until the construction works in autumn, the spire was red but then it was coloured green. Reconstructing the tower cost the city administration 1.8 million crowns in the old currency (Estonian crowns). The money was taken from the town's budget.

Tallinn Town Hall's attic was cleaned in 2002 and 2003. The construction company demolished the chimney to "the level of the attic floor" that had emerged from the rubbish that had accumulated in the vaults. The people undertaking the demolition did not dig through it themselves. About 300 tonnes/70 truckloads of rubbish were carried out from the vault's top. The vast majority was the ground that filled the gaps between arch domes and which historically fulfilled the role of heating. More than 300 findings were found during the excavation, among them were unique documents and things. During the past ten years they have been examined, cleaned and preserved and a small selection of them is on exhibition in the town hall's attic. Letters written to the town council and aldermen from the 14th–16th centuries, medieval firefighting equipment, tools, revolutionary leaflets from the year 1905, and more are on display. Teddy Böckler (born 17 May 1930 – died 8 December 2005), was Tallinn Town Hall's restoration architect from 1959 until the last restoration phase that was finished according to his project in 2006.

Most of the elements of the interior decor were not thrown away as the town hall's architect back then – Böckler – thought that they were a nice, complete and dignified part of the interior. In addition to the citizen's hall furniture, carbon black polyester lacquer partition doors called piano doors, which were very fashionable at the time and are in harmony with the other black elements of the interior, remained. The director of the town hall, Elviira Liiver Holmström, said that in addition to being restored, the town hall was partly reconstructed. Because of this, the town hall kitchen got back its casing pipe, which was once demolished. The chimney is partly a stairway where a spiral staircase leads to the attic. The attic was cleaned of dust and renovated and has become a museum and place for exhibitions.

In 2003, on 17 April, a huge piece of chimney from the 17th century that had been found while excavating the layer of rubbish in the attic fell through the big hall's ceiling; the hall was closed to events until 5 May. According to Böckler, the human-height piece from the fireplace stayed untouched during the restoration works in the 1970s. Two-metre high parts on the foot chimney were cleaned during the excavation of the Town Hall's attic. The brick lost its support from friction and relied on the wooden cover of the vaulted ceiling, of which the rope broke at night. At the moment of the accident, there were no people in the room.

In 2008, a medieval well and different models were found under the floor. The accounting room located on the second floor that had been the aldermen's workroom – and from the end of the 19th century until the 1970s the mayor's cabinet – was innovated in the same year. Tallies from the 16th and 17th century were copied, the copies were exhibited and the whole room was redesigned.

In 2009, Tallinn Town Hall underwent repairs for two months from February to March and the building was closed. Major repairs were planned. Initially there were plans to make floor repairs and large renovations. Floor tiles from dolomite were planned to be replaced with limestone. In addition to excavation, an underground drainage was planned to be opened to examine its condition; in addition, the expected findings were intended to be exhibited. Due to the lack of money, the scale of the project declined. Repairs were done in the basement hall, but events were not held in the upper hall due to the construction dust and noise. The walls of the ceiling had become friable to the touch and had started to decay. The ceiling in the basement was cleaned from the hatched and dirty latex colour and whitewashed. In addition, repairs were made in the staff room, which was given new furniture and lighting, as the rooms were too dim before the repairs.

== Tower ==
The town hall tower was built along with the town hall in 1402–1404. In the beginning, the tower had a gothic style pyramidal spire, which was replaced in 1627 by a renaissance-shaped spire (height 26 metres). The height of the tower starting from the lower part of the arcade is 64 metres.

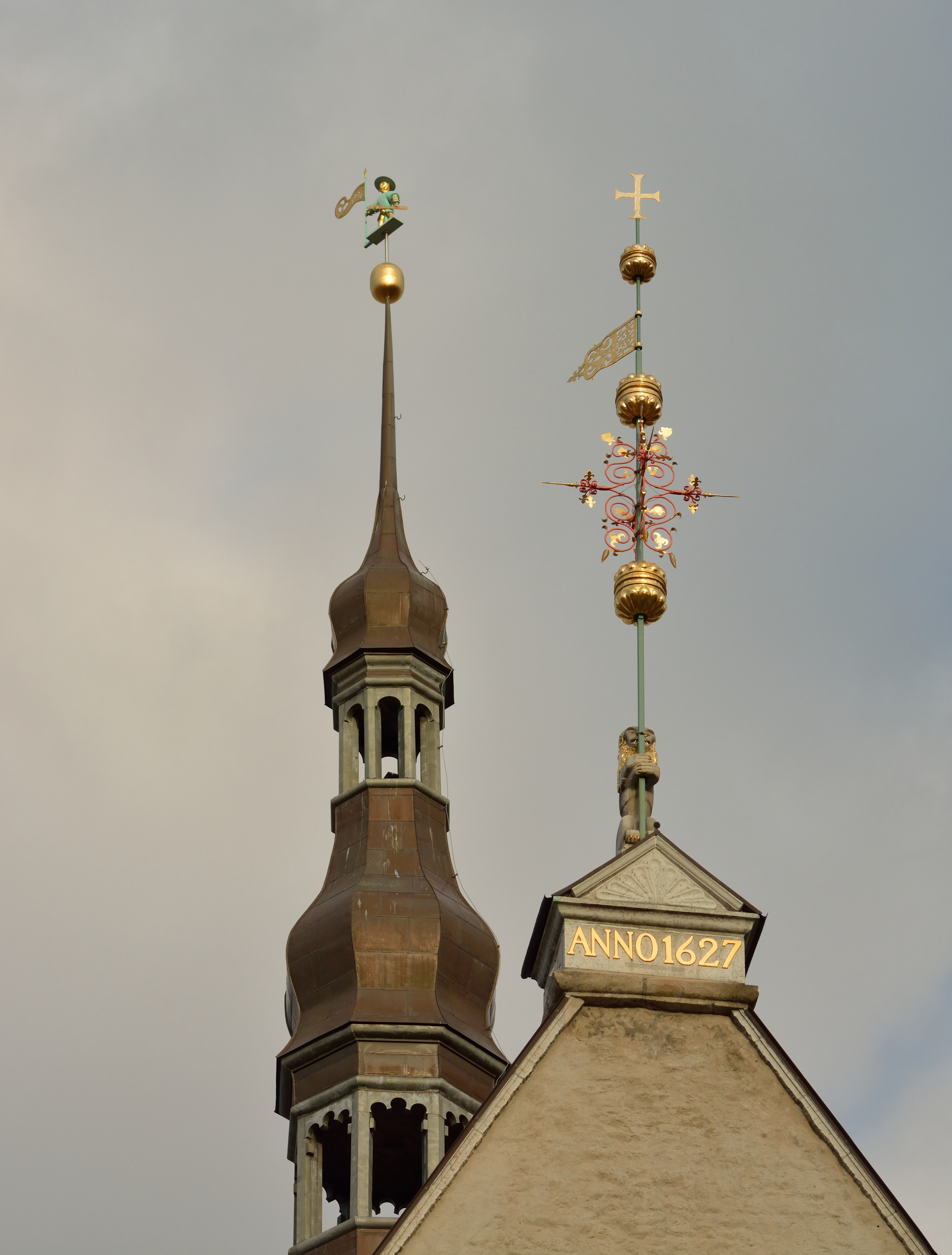
The tower of the town hall

It is possible to climb up into the Town Hall tower and see the old town from a completely different angle. It is not possible to get to the tower's dome edge where the borders can be seen, but the first windows can still be reached (exactly to the tower's clock). Half of the windows have metal nets in front of them; the others have bars. The staircase leading up is steep, but as the tower is not very high, it is not a problem.

Writings about the tower's history can be seen. The narrow staircase allows only one guest to come and go. So, getting from one side to the other is not very simple, however the stair bays sometimes give the opportunity to let faster people pass. The staircase leading to the tower has 115 stairs. The clock balcony is located 34 metres above the ground.

== Old Thomas ==
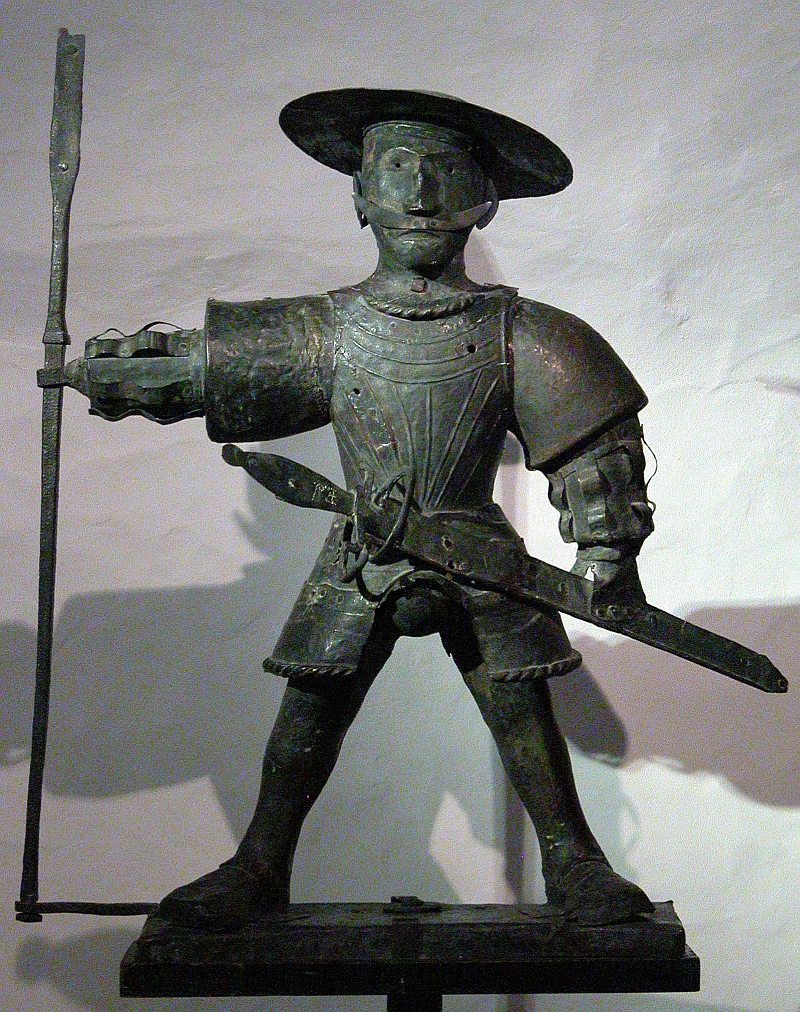
The Old Thomas, who was made in 1530 (2009)

The Old Thomas (Estonian: Vana Toomas) figure is an important symbol of Tallinn. The first vane depicting the famous soldier was placed on the top of the town hall in 1530. Arguably, the model for the vane was a peasant. As a young boy, he became famous for winning the crossbow competition held by the Baltic German elite, where a colorful wooden parrot placed on the top of a post was shot down. He was the only one to shoot it down after a long competition. As his post-natal status did not actually allow him to compete, he did not get the prize. Instead, thanks to the Mayor, he received the eternal glory of being a city guard. The brave war servant stayed on guard until 1944 when the tower burst into flames in a bomb attack in March. In 1952, the burned spire was restored and a copy of the Old Thomas was installed. The original, the Old Thomas from 1530, is now in the ancient basement of the town hall. In 1996, the Old Thomas was again replaced, as the one from 1952 was in bad condition. The Old Thomas from 1952 is in the Tallinn City Museum.

== Interior ==
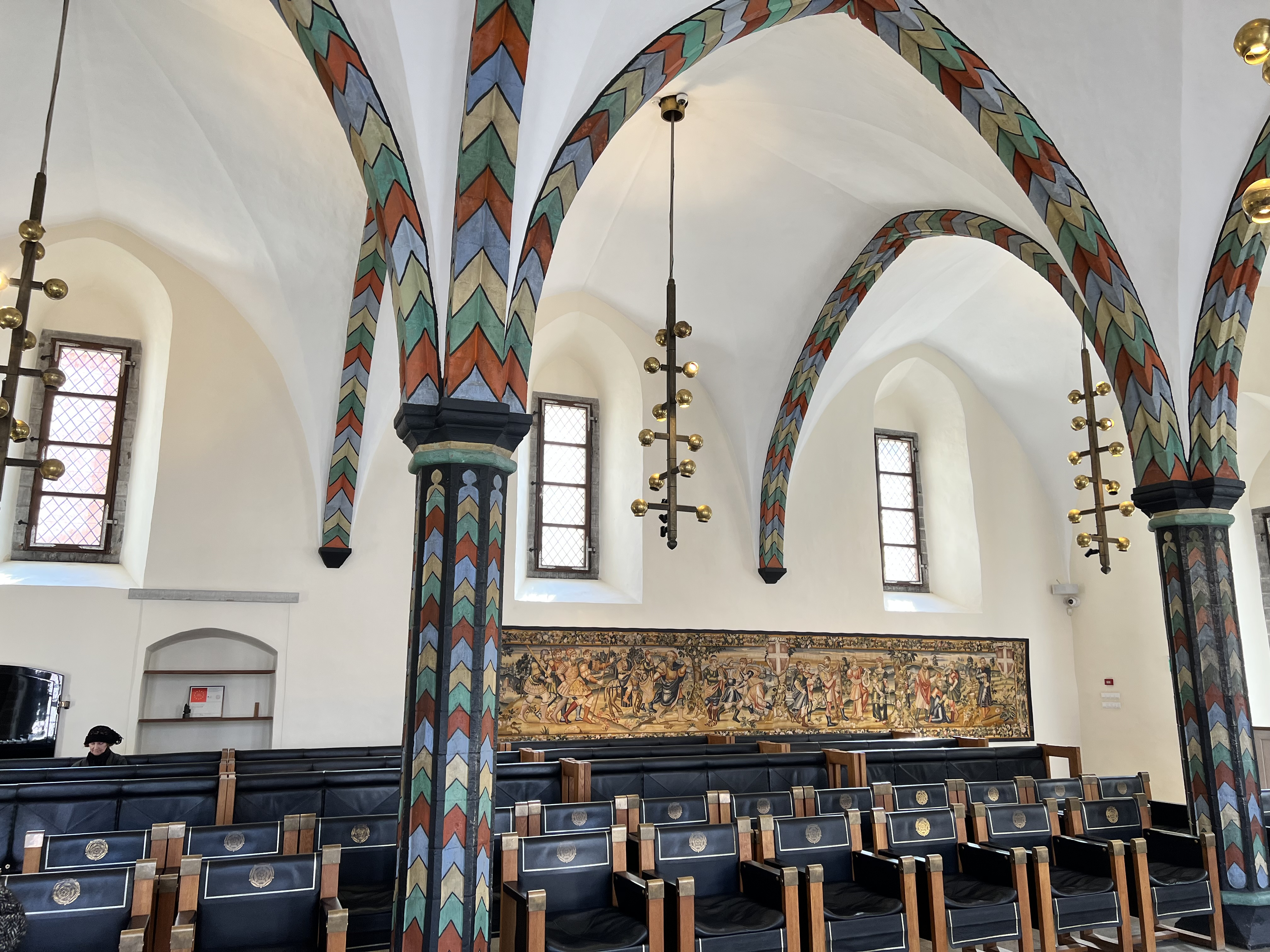
Interior of the main hall, located on the second floor of the building

=== Tapestries ===
In 1547, the Tallinn town council ordered arrases and bench tapestries. The tapestries were knitted using dyed wool with natural textile colors. They were made in the Netherlands in the city of Enghien. The details of the story of King Solomon are depicted in the tapestries. On each one there are three Tallinn coats of arms as an identification of the client and the year the tapestry was made (1547) is written above the coat of arms. Since 1937, these tapestries have belonged to the Tallinn City Museum. There are copies in the Tallinn Town Hall.

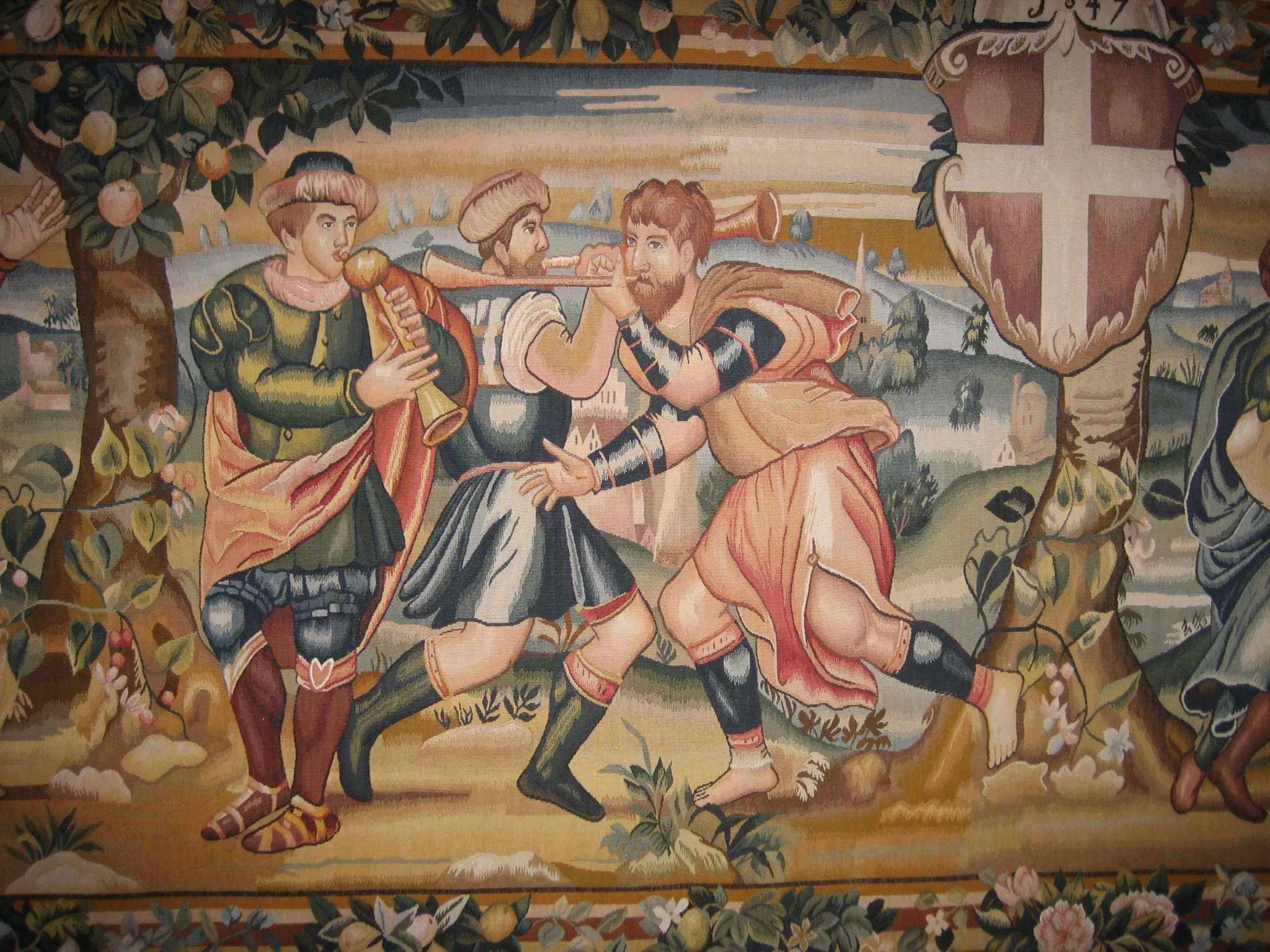
Detail of the tapestry woven in 1547 for Tallinn Town Hall / Life of King Solomon

The nine-metre original of the Tallinn tapestries is kept in the Tallinn City Museum textile warehouse. The tapestries, which are five and a half centuries old, are so valuable that they cannot be touched with bare hands. The copy in Tallinn Town Hall was made in Oxford, England by a company named Hines of Oxford for the 600th birthday of the Tallinn Town Hall. The tapestry-making was directed by photographs and unfaded wool samples taken from the back of the carpet.

Göran Bo Hellers, a professor at the Royal Institute of Technology in Sweden, looked at the tapestry woven in the Netherlands in 1547 and found that a medieval political message is hidden in it, which invites Tallinn to join Europe. He thinks that the message in the tapestries invites Estonia to a Catholic state and under the central power of Brussels. Five hundred years before that happened, Karl V tried to connect different parts of Europe into a unitary Europe. He tried to become the ruler of the united Europe and the pictures depicted on the tapestries propagate that in 1547. The ancient King Solomon could represent Karl V himself, the emperor of Holy Roman Empire. The Netherlands, the country where the original tapestries were made, belonged to Catholic Emperor Karl at that time. Tallinn had become Lutheran during the Reformation. Five and a half centuries later the dream of Karl V came true. Despite some minor disagreements, Europe is more united than ever and Estonia is again a part of Europe.

The seven colorful tapestries that decorate the main building in Tallinn were ordered from the Netherlands by the alderman Arent Pakebusch, who had prepaid 150 marka. After finishing the tapestries in 1548, he paid 341.5 marka and 4 killings. Two eight-metre-long tapestries depict Israel's king and a country gold-coverer Solomon's stories about his life from the Old Testament.

Five shorter tapestries depict colorful plant ornaments. The tapestries were brought into the parlour of the Town Hall only in very solemn cases. The tapestry brought the room to life and made the walls, which act as wind baffle plates, warmer. Tallinn Town Hall ordered the medieval tapestries' copies from an Oxford company, Hines of Oxford.

According to the words of Elvira Liiver, it is a miracle that the tapestries have survived. In the 20th century, there were two occasions when Tallinn almost lost its valuable tapestries. In 1909, the city administration had very many Estonians in it despite Estonia belonging to the Russian empire. City commissioner and businessman Albert Koba wanted to sell the tapestries and build a school or a hospital with the money. The community stepped forward. Very many articles were published, even in the newspapers of Riga and Saint Petersburg. With the help of public pressure, the tapestries were not sold. During the First World War, the famous tapestries were taken in sealed boxes to Moscow to be safely hidden away for the duration of the war. They could easily have stayed there, as did the assets of the University of Tartu. Politician Jaan Poska managed to obtain the return of the tapestries, along with other valuables from Russia, with the Treaty of Tartu (Tartu Rahu). The tapestries have been the property of the City Museum (Linnamuuseum) since 1937.

== The Town Council ==
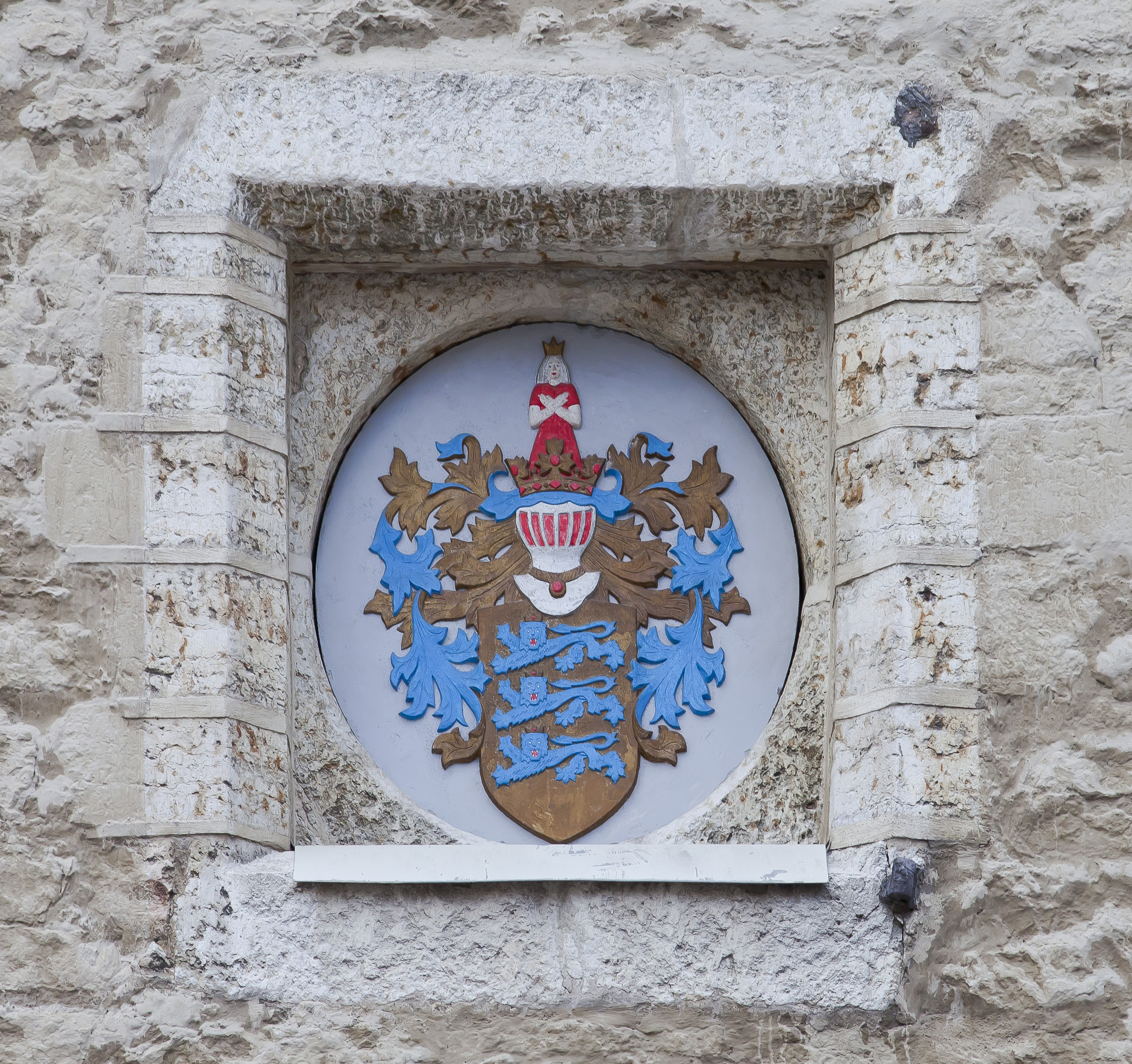
The coat of arms on the wall of the Tallinn town hall

The Danish king Erik IV affirmed Lübeck's city right to Tallinn in 1248, based on which the Town Council that started working in the Town Hall was chosen from Hanseatic merchants. Through this step, Tallinn stepped into the European juridical space. The town council worked in the Town Hall until 1970. Until now the building on municipal property has functioned as a historical representative building.

One of the most important privileges of the free town was to create a town council/magistrate. The magistrate's task was to "observe the town's benefit and wealth". The town hall declared the law, made bargains, and had its own stamp; the town hall also minted money, appointed people to positions, looked after discipline and trade in the whole town, disposed of the property of the town, conducted the town's security, organized the building of insurance and keeping the military forces, held the court, and looked after the completion of judgements.

The town council paid attention to citizens' households and appearance and accepted clothing ordinance. In addition, the most important questions were resolved at the town council: how many new towers would be built in the town wall, what would happen to thieves caught in the act, how many guests a merchant could invite to a wedding and how many poods (Estonian: puuda) of golden jewelry a jeweler's wife could wear.

The town council's task was to represent the town in the international arena – contracts with foreign rulers and cities, fulfilling obligations as a member of the Hanseatic League and taking part in Hanseatic Days (German: Hansetage), holding trade negotiations, the defence of citizens' rights abroad, securing town justice and discipline and maintaining the town's defence capacity, accounting for the town's real estate, civil charges and collecting other taxes, and partial accounting for churches' income and expenses, etc.

The Town Council kept invoice-, annuity-, land and citizens' books, maintained correspondence with other inland and foreign authorities, and examined citizens' applications and complaints. The town council was thus the highest power of the town.

At first only the aldermen were chosen to be the members of the town council – they were the advisers who were chosen from the merchants. The number of the aldermen was not permanent; at the end of the 16th century there were 14. Usually the number of the aldermen fluctuated from 19 to 25.

The aldermen were led by four burgermeisters. At the latest, from the mid-16th century a city lawyer was also a member of the town council. In addition, the employees were in town council service, and they were not part of the town council; these included a writer, a servant of the court, a caretaker, and others.

The town council meetings were usually held in the town hall, in the writer's room near the market square (Town Hall square) or in the Church of the Holy Spirit that was also used for common services. One of the burgermeisters, usually the most experienced and the best jurist, was a chairman who led the town council's meetings for one year. Taking this great post, the chairman certainly asked the other aldermen if they accepted his candidacy.

The town council operated in two shifts: only half of the council's members served at once, who formed a so-called sitting town council (German: sitzender Rat). The half that was not currently serving was called an "old" or "resting" town council (German: alter Rat). As initially the alderman post was an honorary post, they had the free year to organize their own lives and business. Still the "old town council's" members took part in very important decisions or filled the most important public jobs, for example, bill accountant (kemmerer, Kämmerer) or warden of the Pühavaimu shelter for lepers.

From the 13th century the chairmen were two burgermeisters and the number of aldermen fluctuated from 19 to 25. Members of the town council were only merchants with an irreproachable reputation. The aldermen's posts were lifelong. Aldermen had to be born from a legal marriage and they had to own real estate within Tallinn's borders, but they were not allowed to earn a living by handicraft, i.e. they were required to be merchants.

To avoid the misuse of power, brothers, fathers and sons could not be elected to the town council at the same time; relatives were not allowed to participate in or stay for the elections. The elections were usually held on St. Thomas’ Day, 20 December. (This might be the reason why the town hall's vane is named the Old Thomas). The doors of the town hall were closed and the burgermeister reported the names of the candidates (two people nominated for each position). Things were decided by a secret election with an absolute majority of votes needed. After the elections, the doors were opened and the whole town council gathered near the open windows of the town hall. The chairman reported the names of new aldermen with a loud voice; the citizens who had gathered on the square welcomed them.

Every free town was allowed to mint coins. Coinage took place only when the town council ordered it. The town had its own coin craftsman and a coin chamber. In the Middle Ages, paper money was unknown and only coins were in use. Every coin was worth as much as the metal in it.

=== The Town Council as the symbol of an independent city ===
The change of the squire did not necessarily bring any important changes for the town council. A separate chapter of the history of the municipality of Tallinn is the so-called vicegerency time, when the empress Katherine II temporarily replaced the town council as the city administration with the city duma with her city law in 1785 – the so-called charter to cities. The former rights of the town council were restored by emperor Paul I.

A breakthrough in the history of the municipality of Tallinn started in 1877 on 26 March, when the general Russian city law of 1870 was validated in the Baltic cities with the ukase of emperor Alexander II. The town council was replaced by an elective council (duma) and the city agency (uprava). The duma also chose the mayor. The first elections of the Tallinn duma took place on 24 and 25 November 1877. The first meeting of the new duma was on 22 December 1877; Oscar Arthur von Riesemann was chosen to be the first mayor in this meeting. The town council only remained as a judicial authority.

On 9 July 1889 the Russian court act of 1864 inured and the Tallinn town council was eliminated. The last festal meeting of the town council was held on 17 November 1889.

The town council is a shorter form of the magistrate. The magistrate was a council that led independent cities during the Middle Ages. The time of the development of the town council is not known. It could have been in the 1230s, when Danish, German, Scandinavian and Slavic craftsmen and merchants started to gather in the already-existing Estonian settlement. The Tallinn town council was mentioned for the first time in the record given by Erik IV on 15 May 1248, which validated Tallinn's right to use the Lübeck law. The rights of Lübeck's citizens were an example. From that time on, the Tallinn town council remained the leading institution of almost all of the fields of the city for six and a half centuries.

The victory of such independent cities was an important step at that time which meant that the city was free from the power of the king and the feudal lords. The feudals thought that the existence of such cities was "breaking the laws of God and humans". This victory did not come easy. The struggle was successful only thanks to the fact that cities were striving for independence all over Europe.

Each year, the town council extradited its own regulations and orders (Bursprake, Willküre) supporting on the Lübeck law, which were publicly announced to the citizens. When making more important decisions, the town council had to consider the opinions of important guilds, the most powerful of which was the Great Guild. The fact that both the town council and the Great Guild used the same image on their coat of arms – a white cross on a red background – refers to their close relations. The members of the town council were elected to a lifelong position, but after a certain amount of time they were allowed to disconnect themselves from their duties so as to develop their businesses. In August 1255, the rights of Tallinn were revalidated, a month after the first Codex of Tallinn was put together, which had 99 articles in it. Fourteen parchment pages have remained from the codex (the 15th is ruined, but the text has copied itself on the clean 16th page).

=== Regulation from 22 January 1525 ===
"In the year 1525, on a Sunday after the day of Fabianus and Sebastianus, the honorable Town Council let everybody and anyone, who were connected to this city, both clergymen and seculars, to strongly ask and announce that if anyone has any property such as gold, money and other valuables, silver forging, odds-and ends, seals, historical records, or any other wealth, that belongs to the Black brother's monastery and has been gotten from the monks in there as a deposit or in any other way or kept by self, the honorable Town Council must know about this at once and it must be given to them. Otherwise everything that is found from anybody or that is arrested, is considered to be stolen and according to this, the hider of this wealth is not left unpunished."

The regulation of the town council cited above contains, in a combined manuscript, earlier parts which were written in the early 16th century and later parts from the 1550s. In addition, there exist transcripts whose original versions originate from the beginning of the 15th century. The basic part volume contains different craftsmen constitutions including different versions about painters, spinners, stonemasons, smiths, goldsmiths, bakers, sadlers, butchers, teamsters, furriers and cobblers constitutions from the 15–16th centuries. In addition to these, there are some Town Council regulations, of which the most interesting ones are ff.79r–89r provisions from the Reformation regarding reorganizations of church life in 1524 and 1525. The important part of what is known about the town hall actions is connected to the Reformation – for example, new church management, demands to return church property stolen due to iconoclasm, and in this context, awareness of the existence the iconoclastic movement itself generally originates from this archival document.

A regulation on 22 January 1525 was driven by the fact that dissolution of the fraternity of the Ministerial Brothers of Tallinn did not help to regain the important part of the fraternity's property, because the brothers had hidden more valuable moveables and documents largely near Harju and Viru vassals, but also partly in the houses of citizens. After the dissolution of the fraternity on 12 January 1525, the management of the abbey (prior Augustinus Emsinckhoff, lecturer and subprior Thomas de Reken and procurator David Sliper) was taken into custody to force them to reveal information about the location of the abbey's treasure and privileges. The reports of all three have remained, but are not dated. Judging from the hints that can be found in these letters about the negotiations between the procurator and prior about the issue of treasure, the reports were compiled probably after issuing the town council regulation.

At the time of issuing the regulation, it was probably known the houses of Tallinn's citizens contained the property; its exact location was apparently unknown. It cannot be excluded that the town hall had more complete details or at least assumptions about the concealer; however, unwilling to use force, they initially attempted to seize the property voluntarily. Interesting is the wording of the regulation. Firstly, it is remarkable that the regulation does not refer to the citizens or inhabitants, but to everyone connected to the town.

As it was said, the Dominicans did not only store their property in the houses of Tallinn's inhabitants; the town hall could have had information about it (the penalization of the people living outside of the town was a juridical problem for the town hall). Appealing to the clergy as well as to laypeople was a formality of the stronghold of the elite in that time because the prosecution of clergymen was very doubtful in a Catholic town.

Some expressions that concern the distribution of the brothers' property are with a certain content and refer to the fact that the delivery process took place according to all the moveable deposition rules cannot be excluded that with a judicial involvement. What these rules were like is unknown – any remaining medieval acts from Tallinn do not describe such a procedure. It is possible that a more universal civil right was used.

There are no facts about the results of agitation. It can be assumed that nothing important was achieved – there are no longer inventories of the abbey's property among the town hall's documents and the conventory's archives need separate investigation. The regulation cited above is only one example of how energetically the secular power intervened in church life at the time of the Reformation.

=== Watch guard ===
The Tallinn Town Hall had its own watch guard. The guards kept order in the town, but also observed whether the enemy was approaching the city or if a fire had broken out from the tower. When a disaster endangered the city, the alarm was raised on the clock balcony. The creator of the alarm clock, which dates back to the year 1586, is Tallinn artillery craftsman Hinrik Hartmann. There is writing on the lower edge of the clock stating Au olgu jumalale kõrges. Issanda aastal 1586. Igaüks hoidku oma tuld ja lõket, et sest linnale mingit kahju ei tekiks. The meaning of this is: "Glory to God in the highest. Year 1586 of our Lord. Everyone should keep their own fire and bonfire so as not to cause any harm to the city." Until the 20th century, the clapper of the alarm was pulled from the rope on the hour according to the number of hours. Since the beginning of the 20th century, the chimes have been struck by a clock which is located on the town hall's façade, with the help of an electronic system.

== The March 1944 bombing of Tallinn in World War II ==
Tallinn had already experienced several air raids, but in 1944, 8,000 buildings, allegedly a third of the capital of Estonia and about 50% of its housing, were destroyed in the bombings of 9 and 10 March. A medieval weighing house along with many other buildings was destroyed by a bomb hitting the Town Hall Square.

The air raid started unexpectedly in the evening at 7:15 p.m. and its first wave lasted until 9:25 p.m. At 1:00 a.m.a second wave of bombers arrived in the city and the bombs kept on falling until half past three in the morning. About 280 of the Red Army's bombers took part in both of the air raids. A massive number of explosive, incendiary and phosphorus bombs were dropped on the city. The spire of the Tallinn Town Hall burst into flames in the first air raid.

== See also ==
- Vanalinn (Tallinn's Old town)
- Old Thomas, a weather vane on top of the spire of Tallinn Town Hall
- Town Hall Square, Tallinn
- Raeapteek (Town Hall Pharmacy)
- List of city and town halls
- Architecture of Estonia
- Bombing of Tallinn in World War II
- Toompea
- Lübeck law
- Hanseatic League
