= Raekoja plats, Tallinn =

Square in Tallinn, Estonia

Town Hall Square
- Square
- Raekoda plats
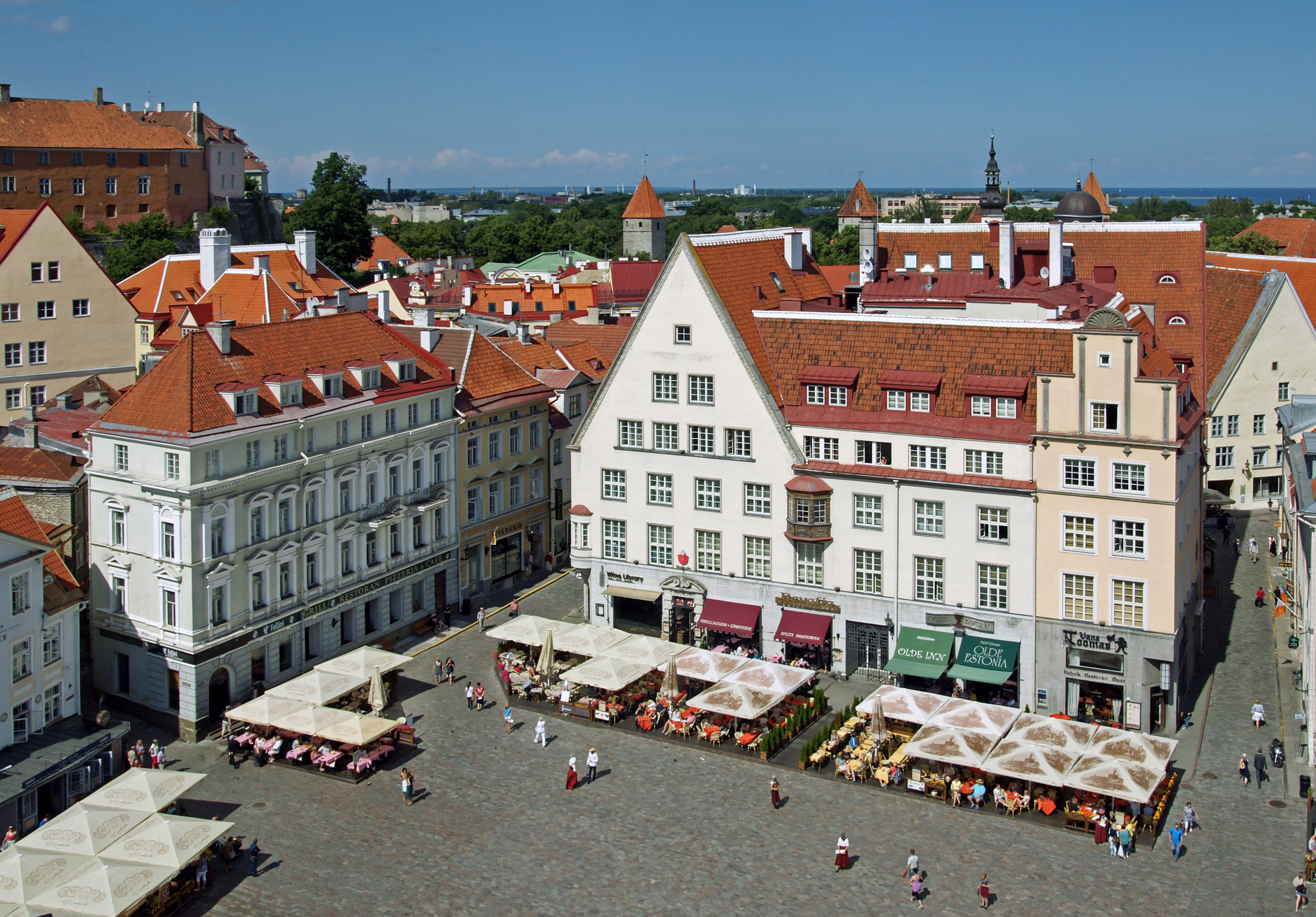
- The square seen from Tallinn Town Hall
- Location: Tallinn, Estonia
- Interactive map of Town Hall Square
- Coordinates: 59°26′14.54″N 24°44′43.15″E

Raekoja plats (English: Town Hall Square) is a town square beside Tallinn Town Hall (Estonian: Raekoda) in the center of the Tallinn Old Town in Tallinn, Estonia.

It is a venue for numerous small festivals or concerts like Tallinn Old Town Days (Estonian: Tallinna Vanalinna Päevad), and several bars and restaurants are located in the near vicinity. The square also hosts a market regularly, with many stalls selling traditional Estonian items and souvenirs.

On the side of Town Hall, there is Raeapteek (Town Hall Pharmacy), which is one of the oldest continuously running pharmacies in Europe, having always been in business in the same house since the early 15th century.

== History ==
There has been a town hall in Tallinn since at least 1322 and a town square next to it ever since then. The hall was rebuilt from 1402 to 1404 into its current form, and a Christmas tree display has been held in the square since 1441, making the Tallinn Christmas tree display over 580 years old.

== See also ==
- Tallinn Town Hall (Tallinna raekoda)
