= Tallinn Old Town Days =

Festival in Tallinn

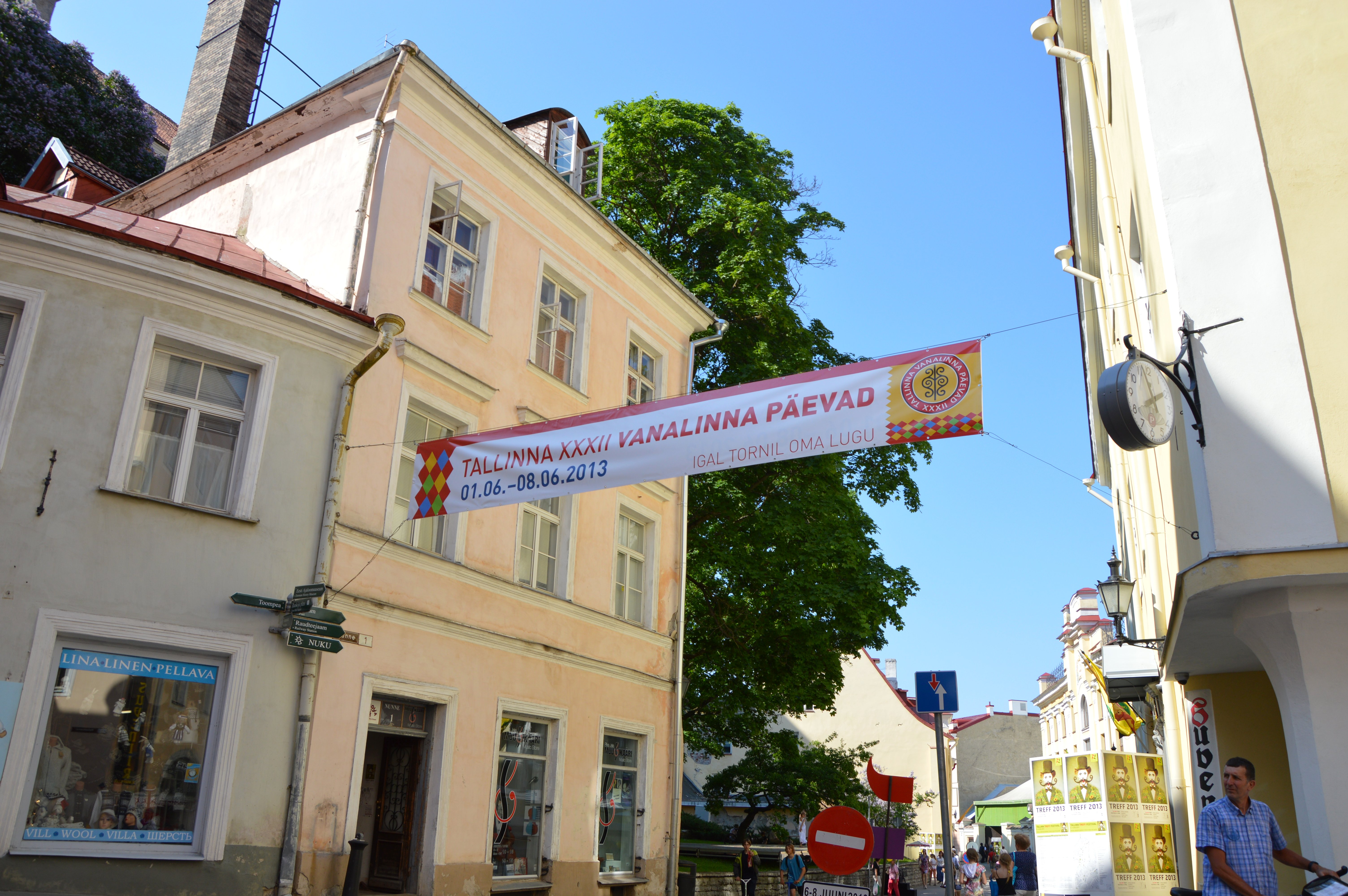
Advertisement banner for Tallinn Old Town Days (June, 2013)

Tallinn Old Town Days (Estonian: Tallinna vanalinna päevad) is a cultural and entertainment festival in Tallinn Old Town, Tallinn, Estonia. The goal of the festival is to introduce Tallinn Old Town to the public. The festival takes place every year in the beginning of summer and lasts about one week.

First festival took place in 1982. The festival idea author is sailor Sulev Roosma and he, in turn, got the inspiration from Kiel Week.

During the festival, Tallinn Old Town's streets are filled with concerts, exhibitions, theatre plays, fairs and other entertainment activities.
