= Old Thomas =

Symbol of Tallinn

Coordinates: 59.4369°N 24.7453°E

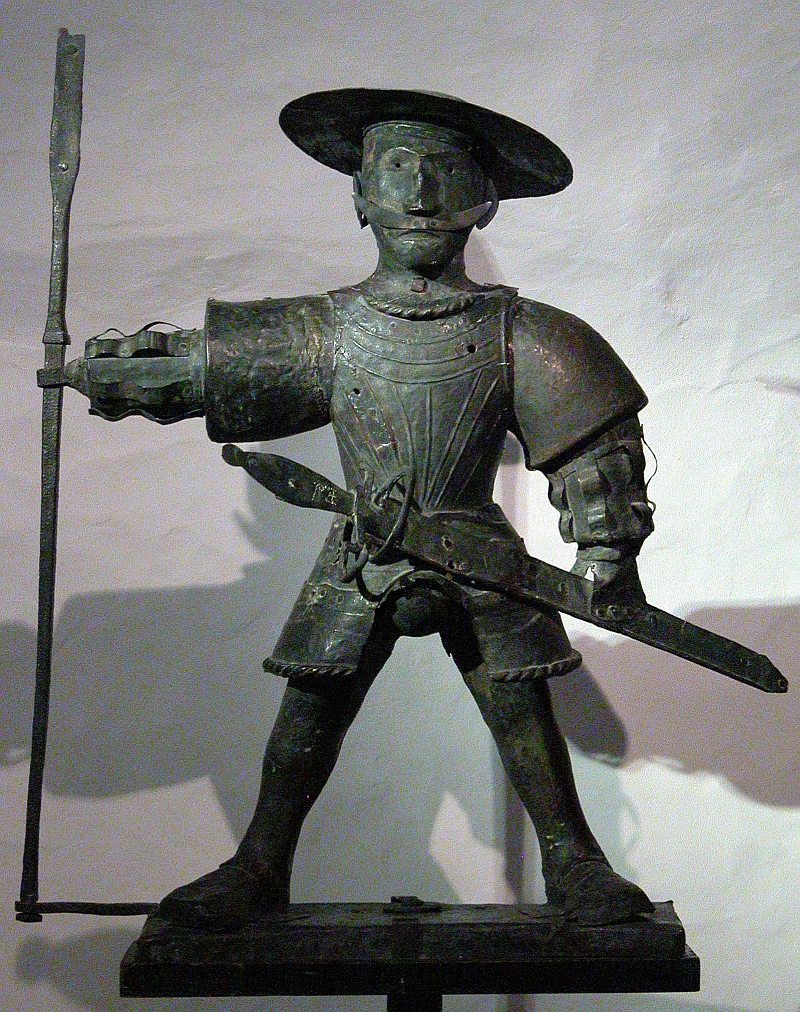
The original Old Thomas (1530)

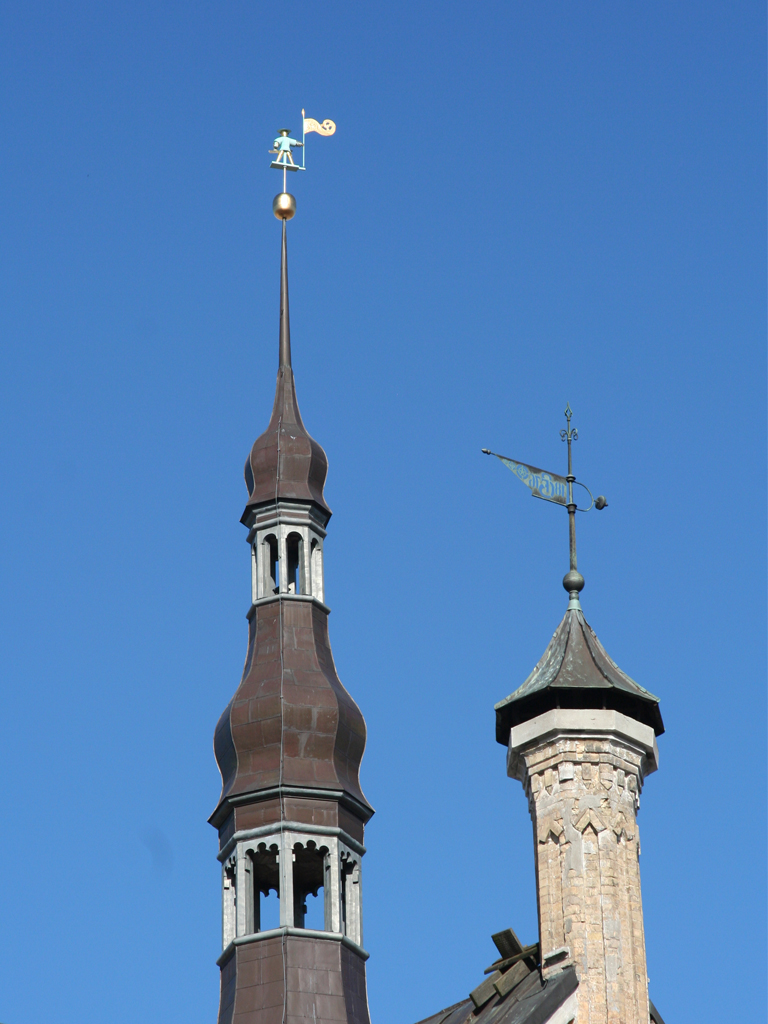
Tallinn's Town Hall spire

Old Thomas (Estonian: Vana Toomas) is one of the symbols and guardians of Tallinn (Reval), the capital of Estonia. A weather vane, the figure of an old warrior called Old Thomas was put on top of the spire of Tallinn Town Hall in 1530.

According to the legend, the model for the weather vane was a peasant boy from the countryside who excelled at the springtime contests involving firing crossbow bolts at a painted wooden parrot on top of a pole, organized by, and for, Tallinn's wealthy citizenry. Unable to receive a prize because of his low-born status, Thomas was rewarded with the job of town guard for life.

All his life, Thomas gave candy to the children in the Town Square, according to local legend. When he died, the children constantly asked, "Where is Old Thomas?", which led to uncomfortable answers about the nature of death. Once the weather vane was erected over the town square, parents would tell the children that Old Thomas was watching how they behave and would leave candy under their pillow for good behavior.

Immortalized in copper, Thomas continues to watch over Tallinn and its citizens. In 1944, Old Thomas was hit during the March bombardment. The burnt spire was reconstructed and a new copy of Old Thomas erected in 1952. In 1996 the spire was renovated and the third Old Thomas figure was put on it to guard Tallinn. The original weather vane is kept in the Town Hall. The one erected in 1952 is shown at the Tallinn City Museum.
