= Vanalinn =

Subdistrict of Tallinn, Estonia

Coordinates: 59°26′14.64″N 24°44′43.42″E

- Subdistrict of Tallinn
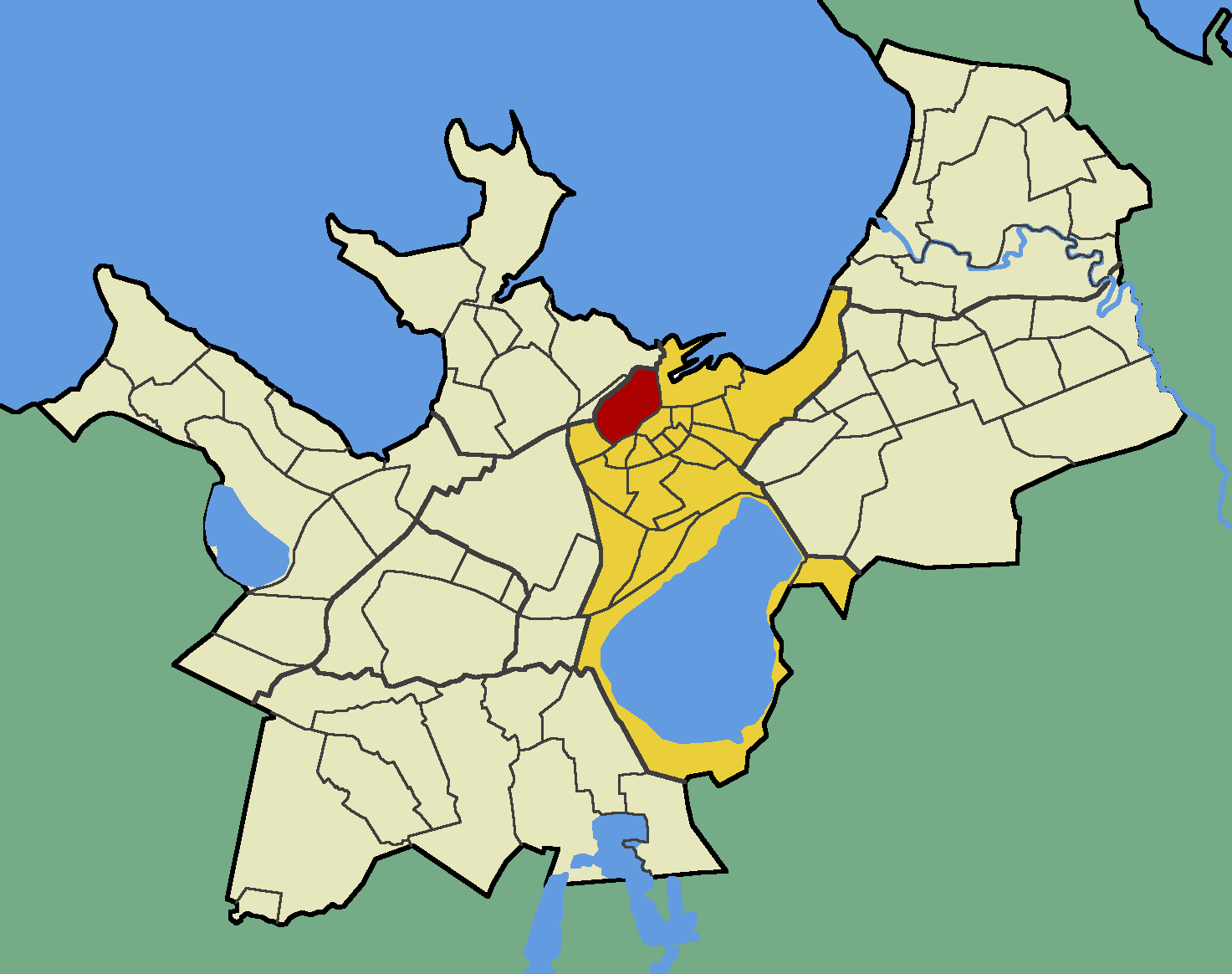
- Vanalinn within the district of Kesklinn (Midtown).
- Country: Estonia
- County: Harju County
- City: Tallinn
- District: Kesklinn

Area
  - Total: 1.1 km^{2} (0.42 sq mi)

Population
  - Total: 4,939
  - Density: 4,490/km^{2} (11,600/sq mi)

UNESCO World Heritage Site
- Official name: Historic Centre (Old Town) of Tallinn
- Criteria: Cultural: (ii)(iv)
- Reference: 822bis
- Inscription: 1997 (21st Session)
- Extensions: 2008
- Area: 113 ha (280 acres)
- Buffer zone: 2,253 ha (5,570 acres)

Vanalinn (Estonian for 'old town') is a subdistrict (Estonian: asum) in the district of Kesklinn (literally, 'midtown'), Tallinn, the capital of Estonia. It has a population of 4,939 (as of 2022).

== See also ==
- Tallinn Old Town
