= Bombing of Tallinn in World War II =

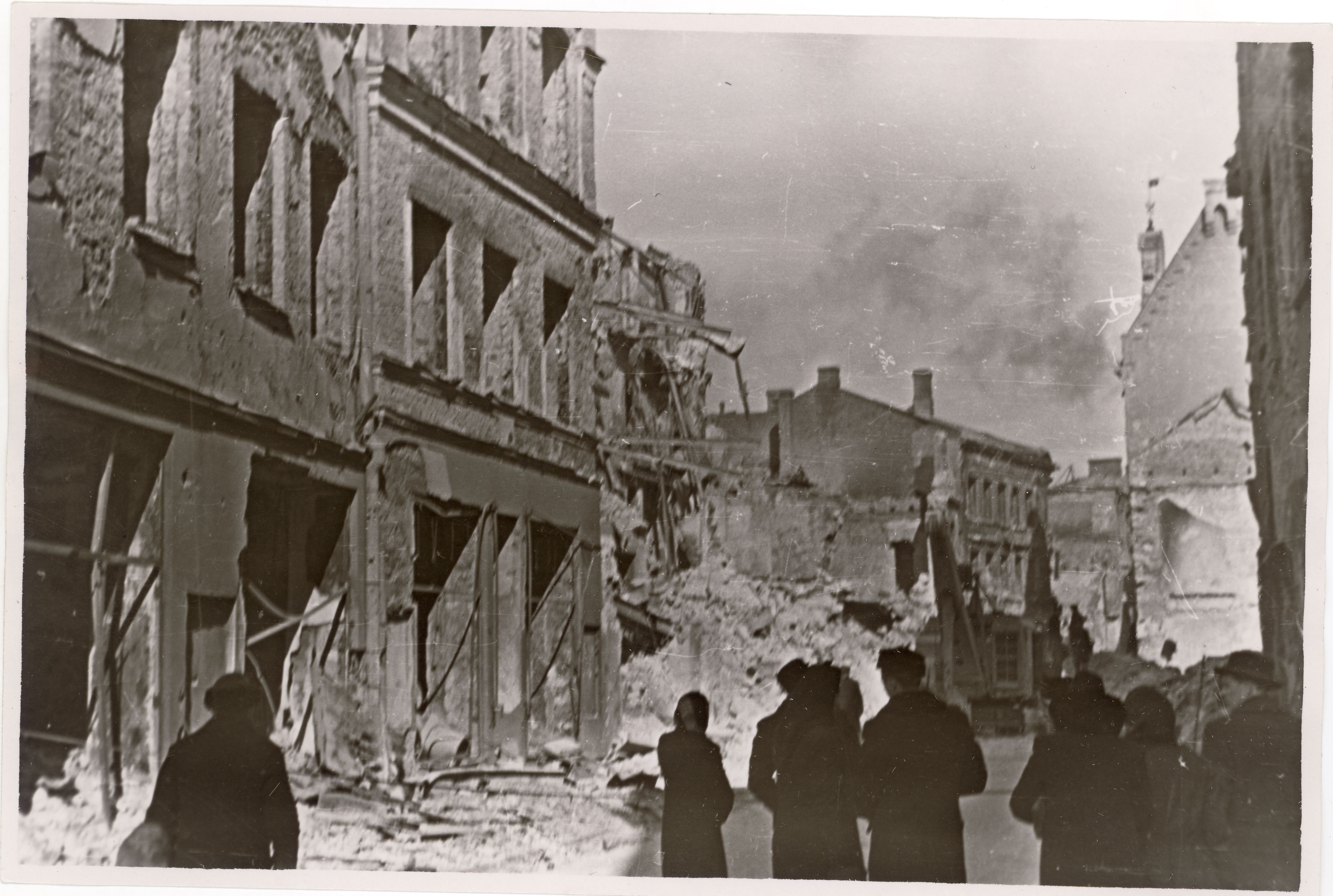
Harju street in Tallinn old town after the Soviet bombing in March 1944

Estonia Theatre after bombing by the Soviet air force in March 1944

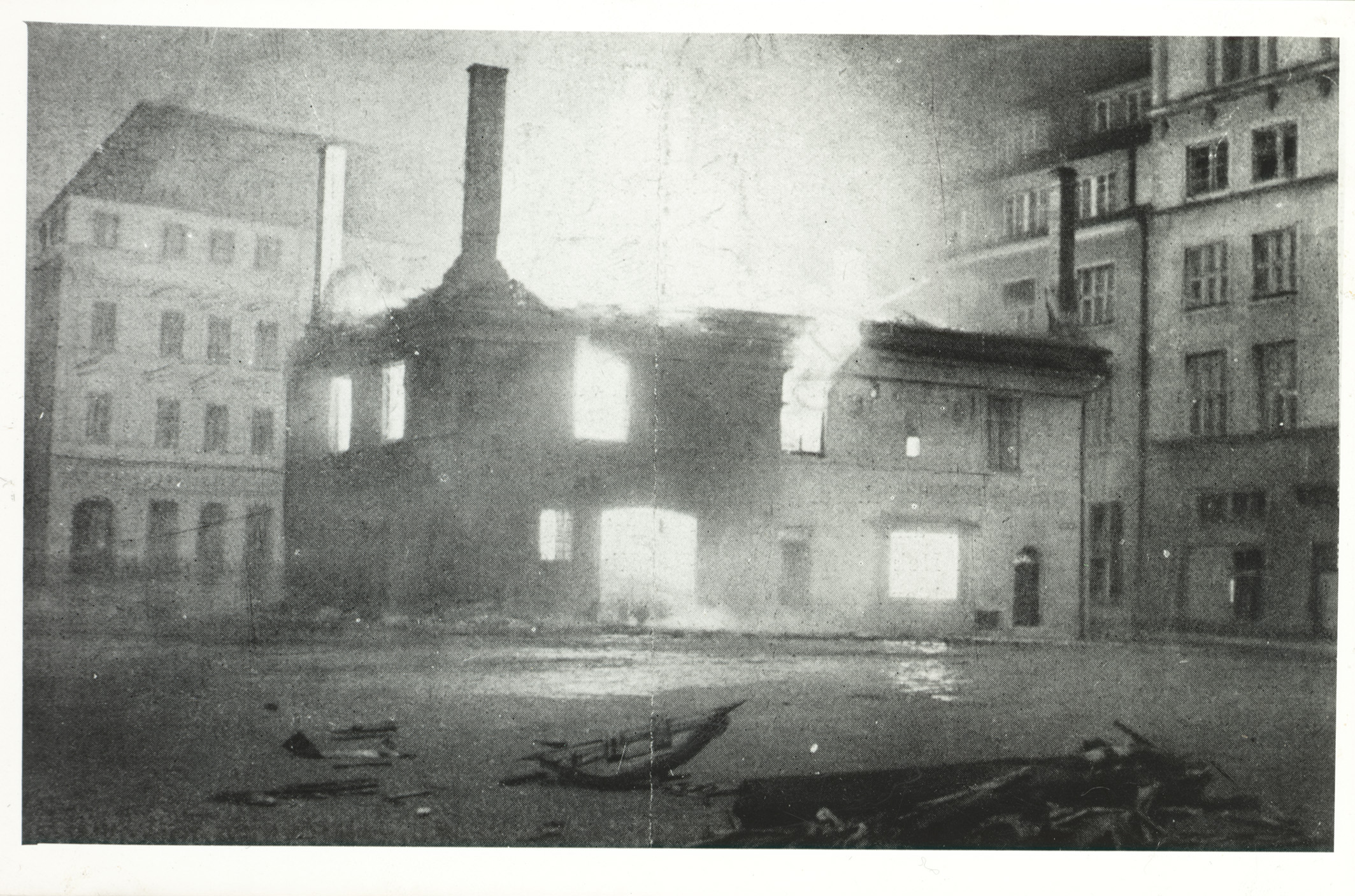
A burning building on Tallinn's Town Hall Square, night of 9/10 March 1944

During World War II, the Estonian capital Tallinn suffered from many instances of aerial bombing by the Soviet air force and the German Luftwaffe. The first bombings by Luftwaffe occurred during the Summer War of 1941 as part of Operation Barbarossa. A number of Soviet bombing missions to then German-occupied Tallinn followed in 1942–1944.

The most extensive of Soviet aerial bombing campaign in Tallinn occurred on 9–10 March 1944 and is known as the 1944 March bombing (Estonian: 1944 märtsipommitamine). After Soviet saboteurs had disabled the water supply, over a thousand incendiary bombs were dropped on the city, causing widespread fires and killing 757 people, of whom 586 were civilians and 75 prisoners of war, wounding 659, and leaving over 20,000 people without shelter.

The Soviet bombings left a legacy of prolonged anti-Soviet resistance and resentment amongst the civilian population of Estonia.

== Luftwaffe raids in 1941 ==
When the Soviet Union invaded and occupied Estonia in 1940, it gained control over a number of naval bases in the Baltic Sea, including Tallinn. While the 1941 German invasion progressed eastward through the Baltic countries, Luftwaffe carried out aerial attacks on the Soviet-controlled naval bases. By August 1941, the westernmost Soviet naval base was in Tallinn, making it a key target for the German air force. Luftwaffe commenced bombing of Tallinn from the first days of the war in June 1941, and attacks intensified in August, while the Soviet attempted to evacuate the city's residents, elements of the Baltic Fleet, formations of the 8th Army, and industrial assets important for war production. The Soviet forces lost control of Estonia in the summer of 1941, when the Germans began to gradually occupy the country.

== Soviet raids 1942–1944 ==
German-occupied Tallinn was bombed by the Soviet air force on several occasions in May and September 1942. During the next year, more Soviet bombing missions on Tallinn followed in February, March, May, August, and September 1943.

In February 1944, Germans began storing provisions, supply depots, and reserve units for the front lines in Estonia. Tallinn's harbor became a main terminal for the Germans' transportation of goods that were supplying the front lines. Due to the increase of German activity in Tallinn, the Soviet air force began targeting the city for bombings in an effort to debilitate Germany.

The most extensive and destructive of the Soviet air assaults was carried out on 9–10 March 1944 in connection with the Battle of Narva. A week before, the mayor of Tallinn had given an order to the city dwellers to leave the town, but the evacuation failed, as the extent of the attack was beyond the expectations of the local people and the German Army Group North. The first attack, from 6:30 – 9:00 pm, saw 300 aircraft drop 3068 bombs, 1725 explosive and 1300 incendiary. Bombers hit the capital again at 2 a.m. for an additional hour and a half. The fire brigades were scarce on water, as Soviet saboteurs had blown up the city pumping station before the air raid. A large part of the wooden suburbs went up in flames, and the city centre suffered major damage. In all, about twenty percent of the buildings in Tallinn were burnt to the ground.

Military damage was minor, with a few military installations and supply stores destroyed. The major military loss was the burning of a million litres of fuel in the fuel depot. Of the enterprises with some military importance, the "Luther" plywood factory and the Urania-Werke-run cable factory were destroyed. Most of the bombs fell on the dwellings and public buildings, including the Estonia Theatre, St. Nicholas Church, the city synagogue, four cinemas, and the Tallinn City Archives.

According to the official report, 757 people were killed, of whom 586 were civilians, 50 were military personnel, and 121 were prisoners-of-war. 213 had serious injuries, 446 had minor injuries. Amongst the injured were 65 military servicemen and 75 prisoners-of-war. Later, more victims were found, with the number of deaths estimated at up to 800. More than 20,000 people were left without a shelter in the spring thaw, while the military objects were almost untouched. Immediately after the bombing raid Finnish air force bombers followed returning Soviet bombers to three military airbases near Leningrad and bombed them. During the attack, fuel tanks were destroyed and ca 25 Soviet airplanes were shot down in Tallinn with an additional ten destroyed by the Finnish Air Force (Ilmavoimat) later the same night. Finland's actions prevented a third attack wave, likely saving Tallinn’s old city from complete destruction.

Despite the high number of civilian casualties and low damage to military and strategic installations, sources disagree on whether the Soviet bombing raids were conducted primarily in order to destroy the morale of local civilians opposed to a return of Soviet occupation forces. Regardless of Soviet intentions, the high civilian casualty toll of the raids significantly increased the hostility of the Estonian public towards the Soviet army. On 27 February, a Soviet air raid had hit children playing in the school yard of Luunja Parish, killing four. The date of their burial was turned into a national memorial day, accompanied by the poem "Uus Herodes" ("Modern Herod") published by Henrik Visnapuu. More Estonians felt an urge to fight against the Soviet advance. A slogan:

Varemeist tõuseb kättemaks! (Vengeance Will Rise from the Ruins!)

was written on the ruins of the Estonia Theatre. The slogan became the title of the newspaper of the 20th Waffen Grenadier Division of the SS (1st Estonian).

The last Soviet bombing raid on Tallinn was commenced on the night before 22 September 1944.

== Memorials ==
The last ruins—along Harju Street in the Old Town—served as a memorial to the victims of the raid; but the ruins were filled in 2007 and a park built over them after careful archaeological work.
