= Tallinn Old Town =

Urban area and UNESCO heritage site in Tallinn

Historic Centre (Old Town) of Tallinn
UNESCO World Heritage Site
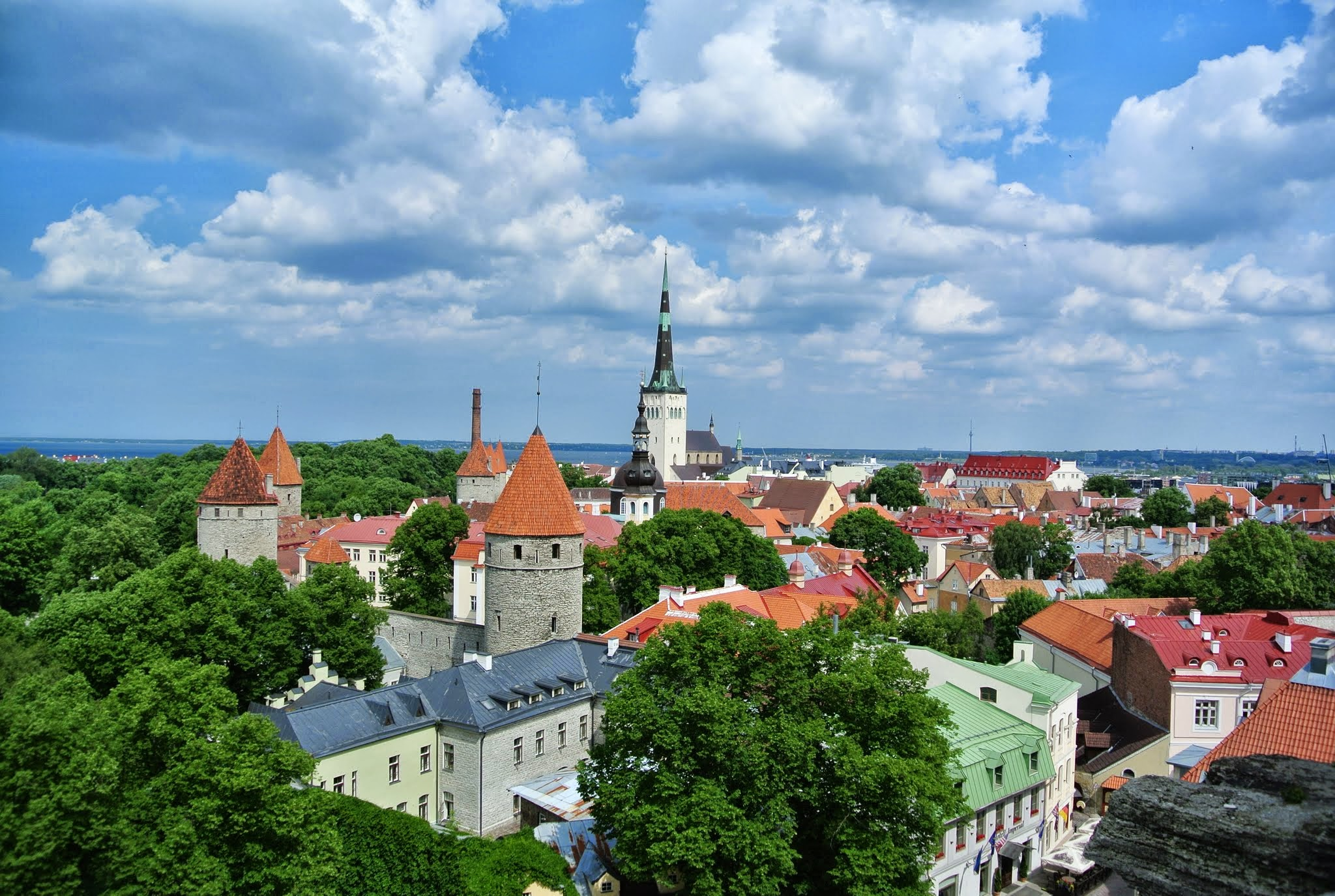
- The Old Town of Tallinn, Tallinn, Estonia

- Location within Estonia
- Location: Tallinn, Estonia
- Criteria: Cultural: (ii) (iv)
- Reference: 822bis
- Inscription: 1997 (21st Session)
- Area: 113 ha (280 acres)
- Buffer zone: 2,253 ha (5,570 acres)
- Coordinates: 59.437222°N 24.745278°E

Tallinn Old Town (Estonian: Tallinna vanalinn) is the oldest part of Tallinn, Estonia. Old Town of Tallinn has managed to wholly preserve its structure of medieval and Hanseatic origin. Old Town represents an exceptionally intact 13th century city plan. Since 1997, the area has been registered in the UNESCO World Heritage List. The old town is bordered by the Walls of Tallinn. Its area is 113 ha and there is a buffer zone of 2,253 ha.

The majority of the Old Town's structures were built during the 13th–16th centuries.

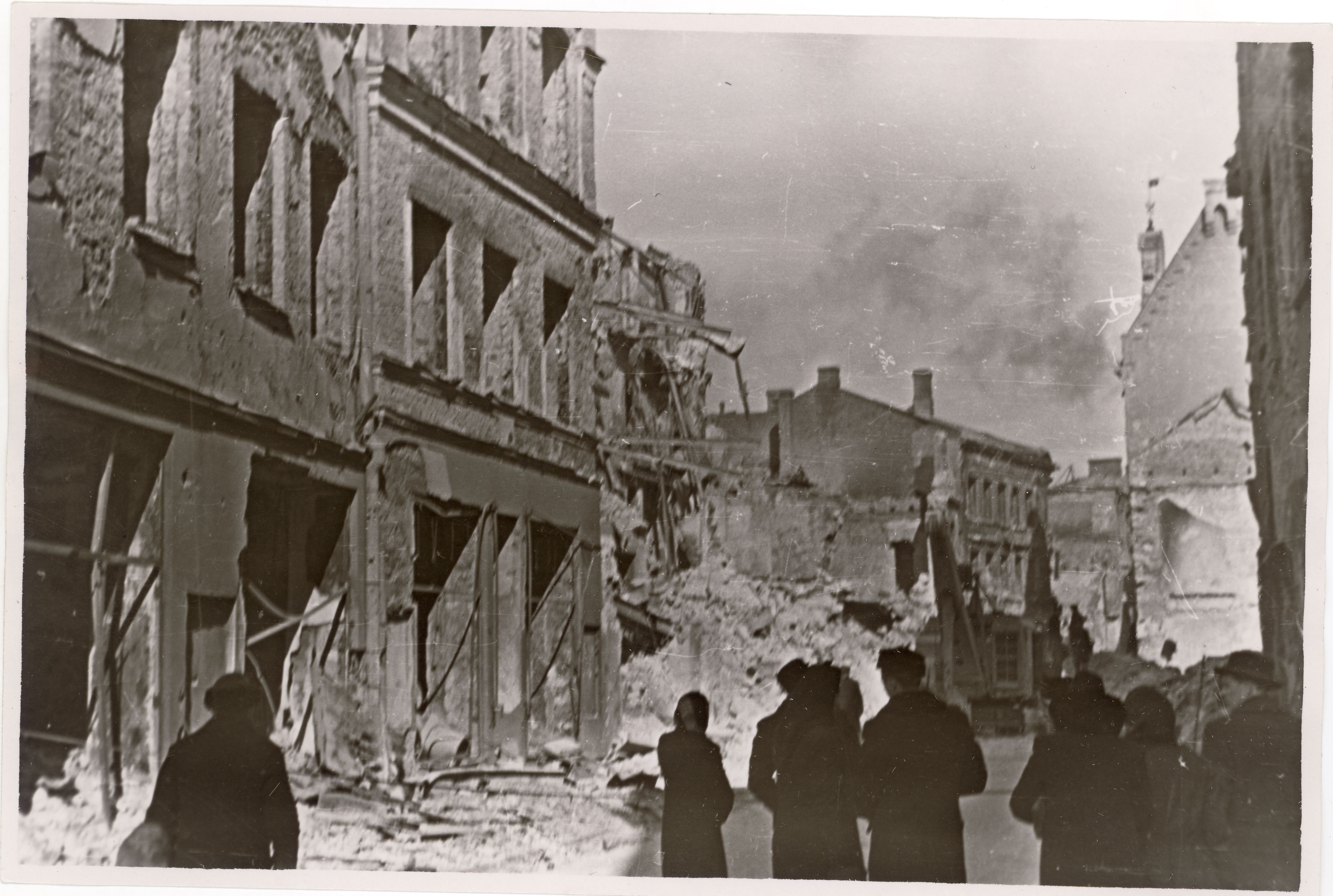
Harju Street in Tallinn Old Town after the Soviet aerial bombing in March 1944

During World War II, while the German army occupied Estonia in 1941–1944, Tallinn Old Town suffered from several instances of aerial bombing by the Soviet air force. During the most destructive Soviet bombing raid on 9–10 March 1944, over a thousand incendiary bombs were dropped on Tallinn, causing widespread fires, destroying about 10% of the buildings in the Old Town, killing hundreds, and leaving over 20,000 people without shelter.

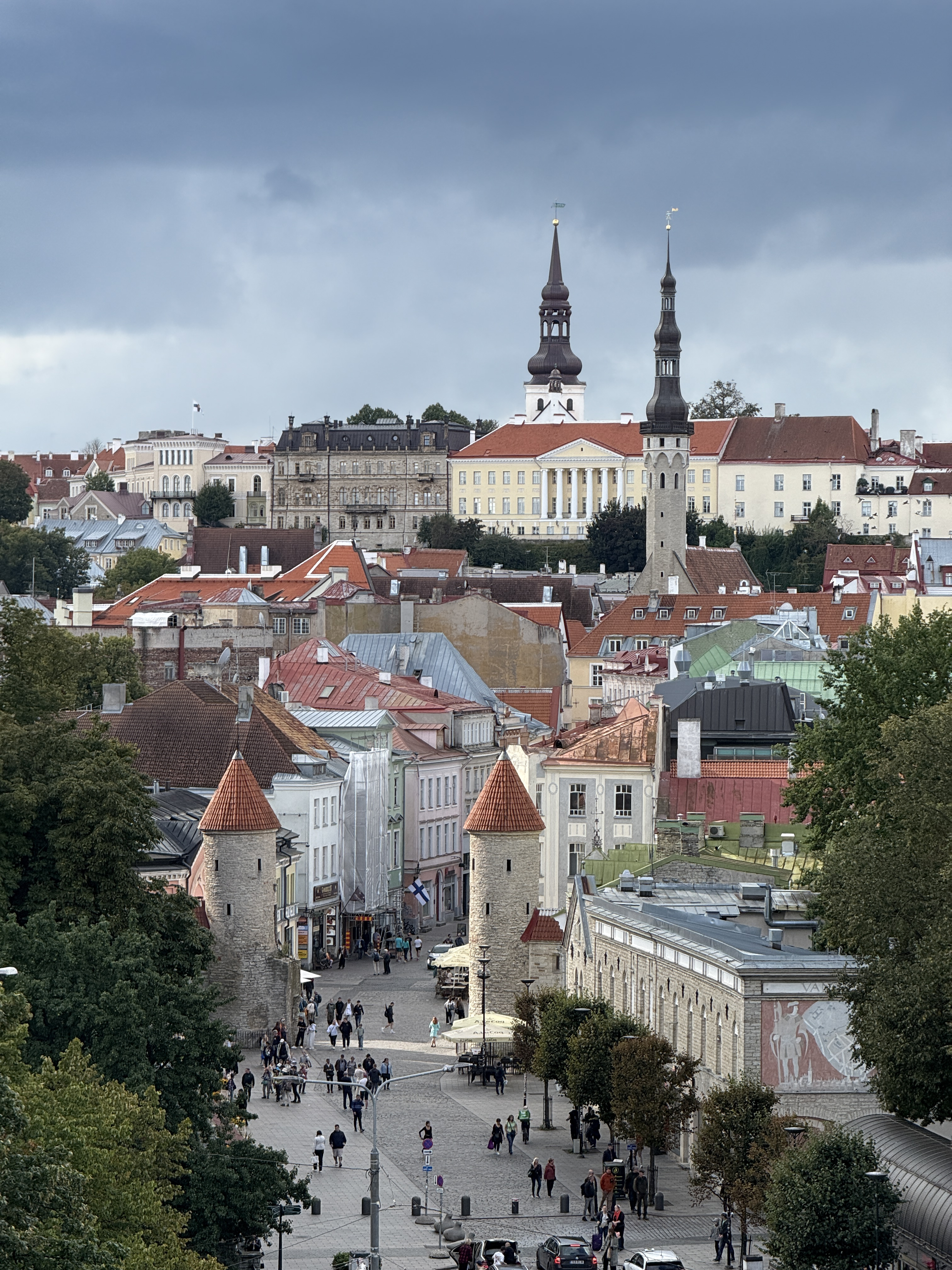
Tallinn old city in 2025

== See also ==
- Vanalinn
